= List of county councils in Hungary =

There are currently 19 county councils in Hungary, covering areas known as vármegyék (urban and rural administrative areas). The first county councils were created in 1889. The Local Governments of Hungary Law of 1990 established county councils Hungary. The number of seats in each council was decreased due to incremental reforms carried out in 2010.

Local authority	Established	Number of seats	Website
Bács-Kiskun County Assembly	1990	23	Official website
Baranya County Assembly	1990	18	Official website
Békés County Assembly	1990	17	Official website
Borsod-Abaúj-Zemplén County Assembly	1990	29	Official website
Csongrád-Csanád County Assembly	1990	20	Official website
Fejér County Assembly	1990	20	Official website
Győr-Moson-Sopron County Assembly	1990	21	Official website
Hajdú-Bihar County Assembly	1990	24	Official website
Heves County Assembly	1990	15	Official website
Jász-Nagykun-Szolnok County Assembly	1990	18	Official website
Komárom-Esztergom County Assembly	1990	15	Official website
Nógrád County Assembly	1990	15	
Pest County Assembly	1990	44	
Somogy County Assembly	1990	15	
Szabolcs-Szatmár-Bereg County Assembly	1990	25	
Tolna County Assembly	1990	15	
Vas County Assembly	1990	15	
Veszprém County Assembly	1990	17	
Zala County Assembly	1990	15	

== Current composition (2024 elections) ==
Assembly	Majority	Fidesz–KDNP	Our Homeland	DK	Momentum	Other party(s)	
Baranya	Fidesz–KDNP	12 / 18	2 / 18	2 / 18	1 / 18	1 / 18	VAN Közéleti Egyesület (1 seat)
Bács-Kiskun	Fidesz–KDNP	14 / 23	5 / 23	2 / 23	2 / 23		
Békés	Fidesz–KDNP	9 / 16	3 / 16	2 / 16	2 / 16		
Borsod-Abaúj-Zemplén	Fidesz–KDNP	17 / 28	5 / 28	3 / 28	2 / 28	1 / 28	MSZP (1 seat)
Csongrád-Csanád	Fidesz–KDNP	10 / 19	5 / 19	2 / 19	2 / 19		
Fejér	Fidesz–KDNP	11 / 20	3 / 20	2 / 20	1 / 20	3 / 20	MKKP (2 seats); VÁLASZ FCF (1 seat)
Győr-Moson-Sopron	Fidesz–KDNP	13 / 22	4 / 22	2 / 22	3 / 22		
Hajdú-Bihar	Fidesz–KDNP	15 / 24	4 / 24	2 / 24	3 / 24		
Heves	Fidesz–KDNP	9 / 15	2 / 15	2 / 15	1 / 15	1 / 15	Jobbik (1 seat)
Jász-Nagykun-Szolnok	Fidesz–KDNP	11 / 18	3 / 18	2 / 18	1 / 18	1 / 18	Jobbik (1 seat)
Komárom-Esztergom	Fidesz–KDNP	8 / 15	2 / 15	2 / 15	1 / 15	1 / 15	Közös Erővel a Megyénkért (1 seat)
Nógrád	Fidesz–KDNP	10 / 15	3 / 15	1 / 15	1 / 15		
Pest	Fidesz–KDNP	21 / 46	8 / 46	7 / 46	10 / 46		
Somogy	Fidesz–KDNP	9 / 15	1 / 15	1 / 15		4 / 15	Somogyi Függetlenek Szövetsége (3 seats); SOMOGYÉRT Egyesület (1 seat)
Szabolcs-Szatmár-Bereg	Fidesz–KDNP	17 / 25	4 / 25	2 / 25		2 / 25	Összefogás Megyénkért (2 seats)
Tolna	Fidesz–KDNP	11 / 15	2 / 15	1 / 15	1 / 15		
Vas	Fidesz–KDNP	10 / 15	2 / 15	1 / 15	1 / 15	1 / 15	Közösen Vas Megyéért Egyesület (1 seat)
Veszprém	Fidesz–KDNP	11 / 17	2 / 17	2 / 17	2 / 17		
Zala	Fidesz–KDNP	9 / 15	2 / 15	2 / 15	2 / 15		
Total		227 / 381	62 / 381	40 / 381	37 / 381	15 / 381	
