= 2024 Hungarian local elections =

- 9 June 2024

The 2024 Hungarian local elections were held on 9 June 2024. Mayors across the country were elected. These were the first local elections to take place on the same day as EP election.

== Electoral system ==
- Mayors of villages, towns, cities, the districts of Budapest and Budapest itself are directly elected in a one-round, first-past-the-post election.
- Assembly members of cities (at least 10 000 inhabitants) are elected via a mixed single vote system, mostly in electoral neighbourhoods with first-past-the-post, with a smaller number of seats being distributed as "compensation" mandates between lists of losing candidates.
- Assembly members of towns (below 10 000 inhabitants) are elected with a plurality-at-large voting, where the voter can vote for as many candidates as there are seats.
- Members of county assemblies are elected with party-list proportional representation using the D'Hondt method.

== County assemblies ==
=== Election results (%) ===
County Council													Number of electors	Turnout
County Council	Fidesz–KDNP	DK	MSZP	Jobbik	Momentum	MH	LMP	MKKP	2RK	VAN KE	TISZA	Other	Number of electors	Turnout
Budapest	28.69	16.62		—	4.98	3.81	10.15 (Note: On a joint list with the Association with Dávid Vitézy for Budapest)	7.89	—	—	27.34	0.52 (Note: Hungarian Workers' Party – 0.23 Nép Pártján – 0.17 SOLIDARITY–L7–HP – 0.12)	1,333,795	60.51%
Baranya	55.43	10.54	4.73	—	6.72	12.16	3.93	—	—	6.49	—	—	186,117	59.80%
Bács-Kiskun	55.78	11.04	2.85	—	9.96	20.37	—	—	—	—	—	—	296,041	53.45%
Békés	51.16	12.69	3.97	—	11.14	21.04	—	—	—	—	—	—	225,153	55.14%
Borsod-Abaúj-Zemplén	56.00	10.89	6.09	—	8.34	18.68	—	—	—	—	—	—	387,676	58.94%
Csongrád-Csanád	47.66	10.75	4.84	—	12.68	24.08	—	—	—	—	—	—	161,344	57.12%
Fejér	52.27	10.17	—	—	6.76	13.59	—	11.60	—	—	—	5.61 (Note: VÁLASZ FCF)	230,214	57.43%
Győr-Moson-Sopron	57.00	12.45	—	—	12.55	18.00	—	—	—	—	—	—	230,430	60.35%
Hajdú-Bihar	56.65	10.40	2.88	—	12.46	17.60	—	—	—	—	—	—	265,476	53.99%
Heves	52.34	12.86	—	6.84	8.18	14.45	—	—	5.32	—	—	—	194,527	59.05%
Jász-Nagykun-Szolnok	53.18	9.71	4.07	7.87	7.65	14.04	3.48	—	—	—	—	—	239,254	53.72%
Komárom-Esztergom	47.47	12.39	3.76	—	11.43	15.66	—	—	—	—	—	9.30 (Note: Közös Erővel a Megyénkért)	168,162	56.36%
Nógrád	56.16	9.62	3.83	—	6.78	17.04	2.47	—	—	—	—	4.08 (Note: Nép Pártján)	125,170	60.44%
Pest	45.64	16.30	—	—	20.82	17.25	—	—	—	—	—	—	1,006,014	57.79%
Somogy	52.22	8.56	—	—	—	10.36	—	—	—	—	—	28.86 (Note: 19.88 – Somogyi Függetlenek Szövetsége 8.98 – Association for Somogy)	204,009	58.70%
Szabolcs-Szatmár-Bereg	62.49	9.18	—	—	—	15.19	—	—	—	—	—	13.13 (Note: 9.72 – ÖSSZEFOGÁS MEGYÉNKÉRT 3.41 – Nyírségi Civil Kontroll)	341,395	59.97%
Tolna	56.92	9.43	4.27	—	8.60	14.76	2.98	—	—	3.05	—	—	150,249	57.81%
Vas	59.07	7.44	3.71	—	7.37	11.22	2.22	—	—	—	—	8.97 (Note: Követ)	143,184	63.05%
Veszprém	50.53	12.89	4.68	4.15	9.71	13.44	4.59	—	—	—	—	—	236,498	60.10%
Zala	57.27	11.78	—	—	11.97	15.17	—	—	—	3.80	—	—	144,726	61.18%
Hungary													6,269,434	58.43%

==== Distribution of seats ====
County Council													Number of seats
County Council	Fidesz-KDNP	DK	MSZP	Jobbik	Momentum	MH	LMP	MKKP	2RK	VAN KE	TISZA	Other	Number of seats
Budapest	10	7		—	0	0	3	3	—	—	10	—	33
Baranya	12	2	0	—	1	2	0	—	—	1	—	—	18
Bács-Kiskun	14	2	0	—	2	5	—	—	—	—	—	—	23
Békés	9	2	0	—	2	3	—	—	—	—	—	—	16
Borsod-Abaúj-Zemplén	17	3	1	—	2	5	—	—	—	—	—	—	28
Csongrád-Csanád	10	2	0	—	2	5	—	—	—	—	—	—	19
Fejér	11	3	—	—	2	3	—	2	—	—	—	1	22
Győr-Moson-Sopron	13	2	—	—	3	4	—	—	—	—	—	—	22
Hajdú-Bihar	15	2	0	—	3	4	—	—	—	—	—	—	24
Heves	9	2	—	1	1	2	—	—	0	—	—	—	15
Jász-Nagykun-Szolnok	11	2	0	1	1	3	0	—	—	—	—	—	18
Komárom-Esztergom	8	2	0	—	2	2	—	—	—	—	—	1	15
Nógrád	10	1	0	—	1	3	0	—	—	—	—	—	15
Pest	21	7	—	—	10	8	—	—	—	—	—	—	46
Somogy	9	1	—	—	—	1	—	—	—	—	—	4 (Note: 3 – Somogyi Függetlenek Szövetsége 1 – Association for Somogy)	15
Szabolcs-Szatmár-Bereg	17	2	—	—	—	4	—	—	—	—	—	2 (Note: ÖSSZEFOGÁS MEGYÉNKÉRT)	25
Tolna	11	1	0	—	1	2	0	—	—	0	—	—	15
Vas	10	1	0	—	1	2	0	—	—	—	—	1	15
Veszprém	11	2	0	0	2	2	0	—	—	—	—	—	17
Zala	9	2	—	—	2	2	—	—	—	0	—	—	15
Hungary	237	49		2	38	62	3	5	0	1	10	9	416

== Budapest ==
=== Mayor ===
Party	Candidate	Votes	%
Párbeszéd–DK–MSZP	Gergely Karácsony	371,538	47.53%
VDB–LMP	Dávid Vitézy	371,245	47.49%
MH	András Grundtner	38,984	4.99%
Total votes		781,767	100.00%

=== Assembly ===
Party	List leader	Votes	%	±%	Seats	±
Fidesz–KDNP	Alexandra Szentkirályi	227,285	28.69		10	–3
TISZA	Péter Magyar	216,609	27.34	New	10	New
DK–MSZP–Párbeszéd	Gergely Karácsony	131,696	16.62		6	–7
VDB–LMP	Dávid Vitézy	80,402	10.15		3	+3
MKKP	Krisztina Baranyi	62,541	7.89		3	+3
Momentum	Anna Donáth	39,471	4.98		0	–4
MH	András Grundtner	30,208	3.81		0	0
Munkáspárt	Gyula Thürmer	1,835	0.23		0	0
NP	Béla Ruttensdorfer	1,315	0.17	New	0	New
Szolidaritás–L7–HP	Sándor Székely	930	0.12	New	0	New
Total votes		792,292	100.00	–	32	–

=== District mayors ===
District	Mayor before		Elected Mayor	
District	name	party	name	party
I.	Márta V. Naszályi	Momentum–DK–MSZP–Dialogue–LMP	László Böröcz	Fidesz–KDNP
II.	Gergely Őrsi	Momentum–DK–MSZP–Dialogue–LMP	Gergely Őrsi	Momentum–DK–MSZP–Dialogue–LMP
III.	László Kiss	Momentum–DK–MSZP–Dialogue–LMP	László Kiss	Momentum–DK–Jobbik-MSZP–Dialogue–LMP
IV.	Tibor Déri	Momentum–DK–MSZP–Dialogue–LMP	Norbert Trippon	Momentum–DK–MSZP–Dialogue–LMP–Jobbik
V.	Péter Szentgyörgyvölgyi	Fidesz–KDNP	Péter Szentgyörgyvölgyi	Fidesz–KDNP
VI.	Tamás Soproni	Momentum–DK–MSZP–Dialogue–LMP	Tamás Soproni	Momentum
VII.	Péter Niedermüller	Momentum–DK–MSZP–Dialogue–LMP	Péter Niedermüller	Momentum–DK–MSZP–Dialogue
VIII.	András Pikó	Momentum–DK–MSZP–Dialogue–LMP	András Pikó	C8-Momentum–DK–Dialogue-Spark–LMP
IX.	Krisztina Baranyi	Momentum–DK–MSZP–Dialogue–LMP	Krisztina Baranyi	BKFE
X.	Róbert Kovács	Fidesz–KDNP	Róbert Kovács	Fidesz–KDNP
XI.	Imre László	Momentum–DK–MSZP–Dialogue–LMP	Imre László	Momentum–DK–MSZP–Dialogue–LMP
XII.	Zoltán Pokorni	Fidesz–KDNP	Gergely Kovács	MKKP
XIII.	József Tóth	Momentum–DK–MSZP–Dialogue–LMP	József Tóth	Momentum–DK–MSZP–Dialogue-Local Patriots District 13
XIV.	Csaba Horváth	Momentum–DK–MSZP–Dialogue–LMP	András Rózsa	Momentum
XV.	Angéla Németh	Momentum–DK–MSZP–Dialogue–LMP	Angéla Németh	Momentum–DK–Jobbik-MSZP–Dialogue–LMP
XVI.	Péter Kovács	Fidesz–KDNP	Péter Kovács	Fidesz–KDNP
XVII.	Tamás Horváth	Fidesz–KDNP	Tamás Horváth	Fidesz–KDNP
XVIII.	Sándor Szaniszló	Momentum–DK–MSZP–Dialogue–LMP	Sándor Szaniszló	Momentum–DK–MSZP–Dialogue–Jobbik
XIX.	Péter Gajda	Momentum–DK–MSZP–Dialogue–LMP	Péter Gajda	Momentum–DK–MSZP–Dialogue–LMP
XX.	Ákos Szabados	Independent	Ákos Szabados	Independent
XXI.	Lénárd Borbély	Fidesz–KDNP	Lénárd Borbély	BLCS
XXII.	Ferenc Karsay	Fidesz–KDNP	Ferenc Karsay	Fidesz–KDNP
XXIII.	Ferenc Bese	Independent	Ferenc Bese	Independent

=== Detailed results ===
2024 Budapest I. district mayoral election
Party	Candidate	Votes	%
Fidesz–KDNP	László Böröcz	6,014	44.99
Dialogue	Márta V. Naszályi	5,551	41.53
MKKP	Gyöngyi Nánásiné	1,802	13.48
Total votes		13,367	100.0

2024 Budapest II. district mayoral election
Party	Candidate	Votes	%
MSZP	Gergely Őrsi	31,638	69.72
Fidesz–KDNP	Rudolf Dombi	12,747	28.09
Mi Hazánk	Dávid Babcsány	992	2.19
Total votes		45,377	100.0

2024 Budapest III. district mayoral election
Party	Candidate	Votes	%
DK	László Kiss	30 368	47.11
Fidesz–KDNP	Balázs Bús	24 861	38.56
MKKP	Viktor Budai Sándor	6,297	9.77
Mi Hazánk	Anna Marosvölgyi	2,941	4.56
Total votes		64 467	100%

2024 Budapest IV. district mayoral election
Party	Candidate	Votes	%
DK	Norbert Trippon	21 579	46.90%
Fidesz–KDNP	Zsolt Wintermantel	16 157	35.12%
MKKP	Dávid Nagy	5,400	11.74%
Mi Hazánk	Tibor Pajor	1,884	4.09%
Independent	Ádám Mayer	740	1.61%
NP	Attila Oravecz	249	0.54%
Total votes		46 009	100%

2024 Budapest V. district mayoral election
Party	Candidate	Votes	%
Fidesz–KDNP	Péter Szentgyörgyvölgyi	5 676	54.20%
Independent	Péter Juhász	4 361	41.64%
Independent	Imre Mázló	244	2.33%
Miénk a Belváros Egyesület	Andor Schmuck	192	1.83%
Total votes		10 473	100%

2024 Budapest VI. district mayoral election
Party	Candidate	Votes	%
Momentum	Tamás Soproni	8 916	66.35%
Fidesz–KDNP	Balázs Kovács	3 693	27.48%
HAFE Association	György Bálint	828	6.16%
Total votes		13 437	100%

2024 Budapest VII. district mayoral election
Party	Candidate	Votes	%
DK	Péter Niedermüller	6 454	35.46%
Fidesz–KDNP	Zsolt Benedek	5 457	29.98%
MKKP	Roland Terdik	2 256	12.39%
Élhető Erzsébetváros Egyesület	Dóra Garai	1 614	8.87%
Színes Erzsébetváros	Béla Lajos	1 519	8.35%
Szolidaritás	György Hunwald	902	4.96%
Total votes		18 202	100%

Primary – 2024 Budapest VIII. district mayoral election
Party	Candidate	Votes	%
C8	András Pikó	12 841	48.86%
Fidesz–KDNP	Botond Sára	11 710	44.56%
Mi Hazánk	György Ébl	843	3.21%
MSZP	Ildikó Szili-Darók	444	1.69%
Szolidaritás	György Simon	443	1.69%
Total votes		26 281	100%

2024 Budapest IX. district mayoral election
Party	Candidate	Votes	%
BKFE	Krisztina Baranyi	10 338	43.75%
Fidesz–KDNP	Andrea Gyurákovics	6 691	28.31%
Independent	Ferenc Gegesy	5 279	22.34%
Mi Hazánk	Károly Kvacskay	1 001	4.24%
Szolidaritás	Dániel Cséplő	323	1.37%
Total votes		23 632	100%

2024 Budapest X. district mayoral election
Party	Candidate	Votes	%
Fidesz–KDNP	Róbert Kovács	14 424	49.15%
DK	Géza Mustó	8 103	27.61%
Tisza	Annamária Barna	5 309	18.09%
Mi Hazánk	Csongor Vékony	1 327	4.52%
Workers' Party	László Kerezsi	186	0.63%
Total votes		29 349	100%

2024 Budapest XI. district mayoral election
Party	Candidate	Votes	%
DK	Imre László	32 774	46.80%
Fidesz–KDNP	Nóra Király	23 857	34.07%
Tisza	István Orbán	10 706	15.29%
Mi Hazánk	Gergely Zakar	2 695	3.85%
Total votes		70 032	100%

2024 Budapest XII. district mayoral election
Party	Candidate	Votes	%
MKKP	Gergely Kovács	16 124	53.64%
Fidesz–KDNP	Krisztina Fonti	11 944	39.74%
Mi Hazánk	Csaba Binder	1 181	3.93%
Szolidaritás	Géza Vincze	809	2.69%
Total votes		30 058	100%

2024 Budapest XIII. district mayoral election
Party	Candidate	Votes	%
MSZP	József Tóth	43 334	77.79%
Fidesz–KDNP	Tamás Harrach	8 669	15.56%
Mi Hazánk	Csaba Balog	1 933	3.47%
LMP	Máté Kanász-Nagy	1 773	3.18%
Total votes		55 709	100%

2024 Budapest XIV. district mayoral election
Party	Candidate	Votes	%
Momentum	András Rózsa	20 317	36.61%
Fidesz–KDNP	Ádám Borbély	17 859	32.18%
MSZP	Csaba Horváth	11 862	21.37%
Mi Hazánk	János Czeglédi	2 758	4.97%
LMP	Attila Vida	2 705	4.87%
Total votes		55 501	100%

2024 Budapest XV. district mayoral election
Party	Candidate	Votes	%
DK	Angéla Németh	16 636	47.49%
Fidesz–KDNP	Ádám Lehoczki	13 149	37.54%
Independent	Béla Palocsai	2 817	8.04%
Mi Hazánk	András Bartal	2 427	6.93%
Total votes		35 029	100%

2024 Budapest XVI. district mayoral election
Party	Candidate	Votes	%
Fidesz–KDNP	Péter Kovács	21 527	56.07%
MSZP	Ferenc Csizmazia	13 615	35.46%
XVI. Kerületi Közösségi Egyesület	Zoltán Ferenci	1 705	4.44%
Mi Hazánk	László Zsidró	1 547	4.03%
Total votes		38 394	100%

2024 Budapest XVII. district mayoral election
Party	Candidate	Votes	%
Fidesz–KDNP	Tamás Horváth	19 270	44.58%
Tisza	Áron Dálnoki	7 346	16.99%
MSZP	Károly Lukoczki	6 760	15.64%
Momentum	Bálint Gergely	4 650	10.76%
ITTHON	Gergő Fachet	3 598	8.32%
Mi Hazánk	László Fazekas	1 485	3.44%
Workers' Party	Péter Gál	121	0.28%
Total votes		43 230	100%

2024 Budapest XVIII. district mayoral election
Party	Candidate	Votes	%
DK	Sándor Szaniszló	25 061	51.53%
Fidesz–KDNP	Attila Ughy	15 409	31.68%
Tisza	Balázs Balogh	4 300	8.84%
Mi Hazánk	György Kaldenecker	1 775	3.65%
LMP	Zoltán Banga	1 411	2.90%
MEMO	Tünde Tabi	324	0.67%
Workers' Party	Gábor Baranyi	201	0.41%
NP	Béla Ruttensdorfer	156	0.32%
Total votes		48 737	100%

2024 Budapest XIX. district mayoral election
Party	Candidate	Votes	%
MSZP	Péter Gajda	14 918	56.75%
Fidesz–KDNP	Gabriella Dódity	9 278	35.30%
Mi Hazánk	András Egyed	2 091	7.95%
Total votes		26 287	100%

2024 Budapest XX. district mayoral election
Party	Candidate	Votes	%
Independent	Ákos Szabados	13 084	49.60%
DK	Katalin Fekete	9 326	35.35%
Mi Hazánk	Zoltán József Tóth	2 097	7.95%
Szolidaritás	László Nemes (politician)	1 314	4.98%
Jobbik	László Attila Rovó	558	2.12%
Total votes		26 379	100%

2024 Budapest XXI. district mayoral election
Party	Candidate	Votes	%
BLCS	Lénárd Borbély	23 131	67.38%
Momentum	Ferenc Dukán	6 592	19.20%
Fidesz–KDNP	Zoltán Dudás	3 516	10.24%
Independent Round Table	Krisztina Győrfi	678	1.98%
NP	Nóra Kerékgyártó	262	0.76%
Szolidaritás	Károly Kál	149	0.43%
Total votes		34 328	100%

2024 Budapest XXII. district mayoral election
Party	Candidate	Votes	%
Fidesz–KDNP	Ferenc Karsay	12 727	44.81%
DK	Zoltán Perlai	12 331	43.41%
Mi Hazánk	Tamás Esze	1 635	5.76%
BTBKE	János Iván	1 349	4.75%
Szolidaritás	Jolán Dankóné Hegedűs	363	1.28%
Total votes		28 405	100%

2024 Budapest XXIII. district mayoral election
Party	Candidate	Votes	%
Independent	Ferenc Bese	5 490	51.53%
Momentum	Ottó Ritter	2 701	25.35%
Independent	Miklós Bereczki	1 879	17.64%
Mi Hazánk	Attila Kovács	583	5.47%
Total votes		10 653	100%

== Major cities ==
=== Cities with county rights ===
Mayoral elections in cities with county rights, 2024
City	Mayor before		Elected mayors	
City	Name	Party	Name	Party
Baja	Klára Nyitrai	Momentum	Bernadett Kámánné Bari	Fidesz–KDNP
Békéscsaba	Péter Szarvas	Independent	Péter Szarvas	Independent (Note: Supported by Fidesz–KDNP.) (Hajrá Békéscsaba Egyesület)
Debrecen	László Papp	Fidesz–KDNP	László Papp	Fidesz–KDNP
Dunaújváros	Tamás Pintér	Jobbik	Tamás Pintér	Independent (Note: Supported by Opposition coalition)
Eger	Ádám Mirkóczki	Jobbik	Ákos Vágner	Fidesz–KDNP
Érd	László Csőzik	LMP-Jobbik-DK-MSZP-CÉL-Momentum-MMM-PM-MLP	László Csőzik	SZÉ
Esztergom	Ádám Hernádi	Fidesz–KDNP	Ádám Hernádi	Fidesz–KDNP
Győr	Csaba András Dézsi	Fidesz–KDNP	Bence Pintér	Independent (Tiszta Szívvel a Városért Egyesület)
Hódmezővásárhely	Péter Márki-Zay	Independent	Péter Márki-Zay	MMN
Kaposvár	Károly Szita	Fidesz–KDNP	Károly Szita	Fidesz–KDNP
Kecskemét	Klaudia Szemereyné Pataki	Fidesz–KDNP	Klaudia Szemereyné Pataki	Fidesz–KDNP
Miskolc	Pál Veres	Independent	József Tóth-Szántai	PME-Fidesz–KDNP
Nagykanizsa	László Balogh	Fidesz–KDNP	Jácint Horváth	Independent (Éljen VárosuNk Egyesület)
Nyíregyháza	Ferenc Kovács	Fidesz–KDNP	Ferenc Kovács	Fidesz–KDNP
Pécs	Attila Péterffy	Independent	Attila Péterffy	Independent (Pécs Jövőjéért Egyesület)
Salgótarján	Zsolt Fekete	SSZE-DK-Jobbik-LMP-Momentum-MSZP-PM-TVE	Bálint Kreicsi	Fidesz–KDNP
Sopron	Ciprián Farkas	Fidesz–KDNP	Ciprián Farkas	Fidesz–KDNP
Szeged	László Botka	MSZP	László Botka	Independent
Székesfehérvár	András Cser-Palkovics	Fidesz	András Cser-Palkovics	Fidesz
Szekszárd	Rezső Ács	Fidesz–KDNP	Attila Berlinger	Fidesz–KDNP
Szolnok	Ferenc Szalay	Fidesz–KDNP	Mihály Györfi	Independent (Tegyünk Szolnokért Egyesület)
Szombathely	András Nemény	ÉSz-Momentum-DK-MSZP-PM-LMP-MKKP-Szolidaritás-MMM	András Nemény	Independent (Éljen Szombathely! Egyesület)
Tatabánya	Ilona Szücsné Posztovics	DK-Jobbik-LMP-MSZP-Momentum-PM	Ilona Szücsné Posztovics	DK-NP-LMP-MSZP-Momentum-PM
Veszprém	Gyula Porga	Fidesz–KDNP	Gyula Porga	Fidesz–KDNP
Zalaegerszeg	Zoltán Balaicz	Fidesz–KDNP	Zoltán Balaicz	Fidesz–KDNP

==== Detailed results ====
City	Candidate	Endorsing organisations and parties	Votes	%
Baja	Bernadett Bari	Fidesz–KDNP	7584	47,95%
Baja	Klára Nyirati	MARÉG	5983	37,83%
Baja	Károly László	Bácskaiak a Városért Egyesület	902	5,70%
Baja	Tibor Üveges	Mi Hazánk	881	5,57%
Baja	Artúr Garami	Független	466	2,95%
Békéscsaba	Péter Szarvas	Hajrá Békéscsaba Egyesület	15 951	61,73%
Békéscsaba	János Pap	DK, MSZP, PM, NP	2848	11,02%
Békéscsaba	István Bodóczi	Patrióta Békéscsaba Egyesület, supported by: Respect and Freedom Party	5389	20,85%
Békéscsaba	Dávid Gyebnár	Mi Hazánk	1654	6,40%
Debrecen	László Papp	Fidesz–KDNP	40 808	48,39%
Debrecen	Zoárd Gondola Zsolt	Civil Fórum Debrecen Egyesület	19 227	22,80%
Debrecen	László Mándi	Összefogás a Cívisvárosért Egyesület, Momentum, LMP, MSZP, NP, Szikra	16 833	19,96%
Debrecen	Zsuzsanna Kuti	Mi Hazánk	7458	8,84%
Dunaújváros	Tamás Pintér	Rajta Újváros! Egyesület	12 938	67,78%
Dunaújváros	András Magyar	Fidesz–KDNP-JUVE	6149	32,22%
Eger	Ákos Vágner	Fidesz–KDNP	8527	35,51%
Eger	Ádám Mirkóczki	Civil Közéleti Egyesület	6370	26,52%
Eger	György Pál	MSZP-Momentum, DK, PM	3020	12,57%
Eger	Dániel Domán	MKKP	1963	8,17%
Eger	József Tarsoly	Független	1566	6,52%
Eger	Sándor Oroján	Egerért Most Egyesület	1203	5,01%
Eger	Ákos Pápai	Mi Hazánk	1044	4,35%
Eger	Lászlóné Orosz	Független	323	1,34%
Esztergom	Ádám Hernádi	Fidesz–KDNP	8418	70,33%
Esztergom	Gábor Bádi	Szeretgom Egyesület	2672	22,32%
Esztergom	Szilveszter Méhes	Mi Hazánk	879	7,34%
Érd	László Csőzik	Szövetség Érdért	21 274	61,26%
Érd	Katalin Kardosné Gyurkó	Fidesz–KDNP	11 313	32,58%
Érd	Tímea Farkas Gáborné Szalai	Mi Hazánk	1316	3,79%
Érd	Éva Asztalos	Független	826	2,38%
Győr	Bence Pintér	Tiszta Szívvel a Városért Egyesület, Momentum, LMP	18 295	31,15%
Győr	Csaba András Dézsi	Fidesz–KDNP	17 856	30,40%
Győr	Zsolt Borkai	Borkaival Közösen a Jövőnkért Egyesület	15 869	27,02%
Győr	Tímea Glázer	Democratic Coalition, Jobbik	2025	3,45%
Győr	István Koródi	Mi Hazánk	1766	3,01%
Győr	László Kovács	Civilek Győrért Egyesület	1668	2,84%
Győr	Jenő Balla	Összefogás Győrért Egyesület	1257	2,14%
Hódmezővásárhely	Péter Márki-Zay	MMN	12 504	55,10%
Hódmezővásárhely	István Grezsa	Fidesz–KDNP	8658	38,15%
Hódmezővásárhely	Pál Kovács	Független	866	3,82%
Hódmezővásárhely	Norbert Balog	Mi Hazánk	664	2,93%
Kaposvár	Károly Szita	Fidesz–KDNP	13 803	52,10%
Kaposvár	Attila Pintér	DK, MSZP, Momentum, Jobbik	5856	22,10%
Kaposvár	Ákos Ervin Horváth	Új polgármestert, Új városvezetést Egyesület	3189	12,04%
Kaposvár	Norbert József Nadrai	Kaposváriak Köre Egyesület	2008	7,58%
Kaposvár	Barnabás Borondics	Mi Hazánk	1636	6,18%
Kecskemét	Klaudia Szemereyné Pataki	Fidesz–KDNP	19 526	41,89%
Kecskemét	József Király	Szövetség a Hírös Városért Egyesület, DK, LMP, MSZP, PM	13 786	29,57%
Kecskemét	Zsuzsanna Hódi	Mi Hazánk	5240	11,24%
Kecskemét	László Kara	Független	3868	8,30%
Kecskemét	Ádám András Klinger	Civil Összefogás Városunkért Egyesület	3212	6,89%
Kecskemét	Tamás Bodrogi	Válasszon Jövőt! Kiskun Lokálpatrióta Egyesület	984	2,11%
Miskolc	József Tóth-Szántai	Pont Mi - Lokálpatrióták Egyesülete, Fidesz–KDNP	24 695	40,20%
Miskolc	László Barkai	DK, LMP, MSZP, PM	13 591	22,12%
Miskolc	Andrea Klára Varga	Független, Jobbik, Momentum	8321	13,54%
Miskolc	László Lehoczki	On the People's Side	7554	12,30%
Miskolc	Zoltán Pakusza	Mi Hazánk	4277	6,96%
Miskolc	András Dohány	Független	2453	3,99%
Miskolc	Zsolt Fintor	Független	543	0,88%
Nagykanizsa	Jácint Horváth	Éljen VárosuNk Egyesület, DK, MSZP, Momentum, LMP, Jobbik	9495	47,86%
Nagykanizsa	László Balogh	Fidesz–KDNP	8394	42,31%
Nagykanizsa	Tibor Hokker	Mi Hazánk	1207	6,08%
Nagykanizsa	Attila Víg	Független	743	3,75%
Nyíregyháza	Ferenc Kovács	Fidesz–KDNP	23 271	45,90%
Nyíregyháza	András Jeszenszki	Szövetség Városunkért, MSZP, Momentum, PM, LMP, NP, MMN	21 075	41,57%
Nyíregyháza	Zoltán Koppány Kovács	Mi Hazánk	4887	9,64%
Nyíregyháza	László Nagy	Baloldali Kör Párt	1468	2,90%
Pécs	Attila Péterffy	Pécs Jövőjéért Egyesület, DK, MSZP, Momentum, PM, Forum Sopianae	28 028	46,05%
Pécs	Péter Csizmadia	Fidesz–KDNP, Összefogás Pécsért Egyesület	21 778	35,78%
Pécs	Péter Szentgyörgyváry	Független	5572	9,15%
Pécs	Zoltán Sándor	Mi Hazánk	2346	3,85%
Pécs	Szilvia Bognár	Tiszta Kezek Egyesület	2262	3,72%
Pécs	Milán Lajos	Független	883	1,45%
Salgótarján	Bálint Kreicsi	Hajrá Salgótarján! Egyesület, Fidesz–KDNP	6346	46,58%
Salgótarján	Máté Huszár	SALGÓTARJÁN, Szeretem! Egyesület, DK, MSZP, PM, Jobbik	4981	36,56%
Salgótarján	Attila György Ferkó	Jobb Páholy - Förster Társaság Egyesület	1061	7,79%
Salgótarján	Norbert Egyedi	Mi Hazánk	656	4,82%
Salgótarján	Tamás Rákos	NP	482	3,54%
Salgótarján	Attila Nagy	Workers' Party	97	0,71%
Sopron	Ciprián Farkas	Fidesz–KDNP	13 572	50,84%
Sopron	Endre Sovány	Független	5340	20,00%
Sopron	Adrienn Jakál	DK, MSZP, PM	3405	12,75%
Sopron	Csaba Holpár	MKKP	1933	7,24%
Sopron	Gábor Horváth	Mi Hazánk	1510	5,66%
Sopron	Gábor Reischl	Jobbik, LMP, Nyugat Jövője Egyesület	936	3,51%
Szeged	László Botka	Összefogás Szegedért Egyesület, MSZP, Jobbik, DK	47 601	67,74%
Szeged	László Fülöp	Fidesz–KDNP	16 891	24,04%
Szeged	Tamás Tímár	Mi Hazánk	3510	5,00%
Szeged	Márton Joób	Független	1632	2,32%
Szeged	Bálint Szabó	Itt az Idő Egyesület	633	0,90%
Székesfehérvár	András Cser-Palkovics	Fidesz	33 259	74,11%
Székesfehérvár	Judit Földi	"Fehérvárért Közösen" Egyesület, DK, MSZP, PM	5733	12,78%
Székesfehérvár	László Juhász	Válasz - Független Civilek Fehérvárért Egyesület	3757	8,37%
Székesfehérvár	Annamária Végh	Mi Hazánk	2127	4,74%
Szekszárd	Attila Berlinger	Fidesz–KDNP	7788	54,03%
Szekszárd	Gábor Bomba	Éljen Szekszárd Egyesület	5112	35,47%
Szekszárd	Endre Tóth	Mi Hazánk	1513	10,50%
Szolnok	Mihály Győrfi	Tegyünk Szolnokért Egyesület, Jobbik, Momentum, MSZP, DK, PM	12 182	39,90%
Szolnok	Ferenc Szalay	Fidesz–KDNP	11 807	38,68%
Szolnok	Áron Tóth	LMP	2911	9,54%
Szolnok	Sebestyén Becsei	Mi Hazánk	1968	6,45%
Szolnok	Krisztián Soós	Független	917	3,00%
Szolnok	Attila Németh	Minden Döntés Számít Egyesület	486	1,59%
Szolnok	Mihály Bencsik	Workers' Party	257	0,84%
Szombathely	András Nemény	Éljen Szombathely! Egyesület, MSZP, Momentum, DK, PM, MMN	25 231	64,92%
Szombathely	Nóra Lenkai	Fidesz–KDNP	11 767	30,28%
Szombathely	Lajos Danka	Mi Hazánk	1047	2,69%
Szombathely	Péter Balassa	Konzervatívok Egy Jobb Városért	819	2,11%
Tatabánya	Ilona Posztovics	Többségben Tatabányáért, DK, Momentum, PM, LMP, MSZP, NP	13 562	50,14%
Tatabánya	Csaba Gál	Fidesz–KDNP	10837	40,06%
Tatabánya	Ferenc Krisztián Vajda	Mi Hazánk	1672	6,18%
Tatabánya	Miklós Fekete	Generációk Tatabányáért	978	3,62%
Veszprém	Gyula Porga	Fidesz–KDNP	12 165	47,55%
Veszprém	Ferenc Hartmann	Híd a Városért Egyesület, MSZP, Momentum, DK, PM	7528	29,43%
Veszprém	Zoltán Adamecz	Együtt Veszprémért	4377	17,11%
Veszprém	Zsolt Kovacsics	Mi Hazánk	1513	5,91%
Zalaegerszeg	Zoltán Balaicz	Fidesz–KDNP	18 686	73,08%
Zalaegerszeg	Csaba Keresztes	Momentum, DK	3464	13,55%
Zalaegerszeg	Balázs Góra	Tiéd a Város Egyesület	1772	6,93%
Zalaegerszeg	Ferenc Kiss	Mi Hazánk	1648	6,45%

== Turnout ==
7:00	9:00	11:00	13:00	15:00	17:00	18:30	Overall
1.88%	9.98%	22.89%	33.14%	42.04%	50.69%	56.09%	58.08%

== See also ==
- 2024 European Parliament election in Hungary (same day)
