= Csongrád-Csanád County Assembly =

Hungarian local legislative body

Csongrád-Csanád County Assembly Csongrád-Csanád Megyei Közgyűlés

Type
- Type: County Council

History
- Founded: 1990

Leadership
- President: László Gémes, Fidesz–KDNP since 9 June 2024

Structure
- Seats: 20 councillors
- Political groups: Administration: Fidesz–KDNP (10); Other parties (9): Our Homeland (5); DK (2); Momentum (2)
- Length of term: five years

Elections
- Last election: 9 June 2024
- Next election: 2029

Meeting place
- County Hall, Szeged

Website
- csongrad-megye.hu

The Csongrád-Csanád County Assembly (Hungarian: Csongrád-Csanád Megyei Közgyűlés) is the local legislative body of Csongrád-Csanád County in the Southern Great Plain in Hungary.

== Composition ==
Deputies in Csongrád-Csanád County Assembly
Key to parties Hungarian Workers' Party (Munkáspárt) Agrarian Alliance (Agrárszövettség) Hungarian Socialist Party (MSZP): MSZP-SZDSZ alliance (2002, 2006); Democratic Coalition (DK) Alliance of Free Democrats (SZDSZ) Momentum Movement (Momentum) Jobbik Fidesz (Fidesz–KDNP): Fidesz-MDF-MKDSZ-KPE alliance (2002); Fidesz-KDNP-KPE-NF-MAGOSZ-VP alliance (2002); Fidesz-KDNP alliance (from 2010); Christian Democratic People's Party (KDNP) Hungarian Christian Democratic Alliance (MKDSZ) Hungarian Democratic Forum (MDF) Independent Smallholders, Agrarian Workers and Civic Party (FKgP) Our Homeland Movement (Mi Hazánk) Independent / Others: Entrepreneurs Association of Mórahalom (1994); Pusztaszeri TÁJ (1998, 2002); MTPF (1998); Association of Homokhát Municipalities (1998, 2002, 2006); Together for Szentes (1998); Mako Agglomeration (2002); Cooperation for Csongrád Civil Alliance for Makó (PSZM)
| Period | Distribution | Seats |
| 1994–1998 | 1 / 1 / 13 / 5 / 2 / 4 / 3 / 9 / 2 | 40 |
| 1998–2002 | 11 / 1 / 10 / 6 / 2 / 2 / 2 / 2 / 2 / 1 / 1 | 40 |
| 2002–2006 | 19 / 15 / 2 / 1 / 1 / 1 / 1 | 40 |
| 2006–2010 | 16 / 20 / 3 / 1 | 40 |
| 2010–2014 | 6 / 12 / 2 | 20 |
| 2014–2019 | 5 / 11 / 4 | 20 |
| 2019–2024 | 2 / 1 / 1 / 2 / 12 / 2 | 20 |
| 2024–2029 | 2 / 2 / 10 / 5 | 20 |

=== 2024 ===
2024 Hungarian local elections

Summary of the 2024 election results
| Party | Votes | % | +/- | Seats | +/- | Seats % |
|---|---|---|---|---|---|---|
| Fidesz–KDNP | | 47.66 | ▼ | | ▼ | |
| Our Homeland Movement (Mi Hazánk) | | 24.08▲ | | | ▲ | |
| Momentum Movement (Momentum) | | 12.68 | | | | |
| Democratic Coalition (DK) | | 10.75 | | | | |
| Hungarian Socialist Party (MSZP) | | 4.84 | ▼ | | ▼ | |
| Total | | | | | | |
| Voter turnout | | | | | | |

=== 2019 ===
The Assembly elected at the 2019 local government elections, is made up of 20 counselors, with the following party composition:

Summary of the 13 October 2019 election results
| Party | Votes | % | +/- | Seats | +/- | Seats % |
|---|---|---|---|---|---|---|
| Fidesz–KDNP | 41,688 | 54.04 | ▲5.59 | 12 | ▲1 | 60.00 |
| Hungarian Socialist Party (MSZP) | 8,183 | 10.61 | ▼11.17 | 2 | ▼3 | 10.00 |
| Jobbik | 7,714 | 10.00 | ▼8.65 | 2 | ▼2 | 10.00 |
| Our Homeland Movement (Mi Hazánk) | 6,991 | 9.06 | | 2 | ▲2 | 10.00 |
| Democratic Coalition (DK) | 6,341 | 8.22 | ▲5.10 | 1 | ▲1 | 5.00 |
| Momentum Movement (Momentum) | 6,228 | 8.07 | | 1 | ▲1 | 5.00 |
| Total | 80,042 | 100.0 | | 20 | 0 | |
| Voter turnout | | 48.23 | ▲2.82 | | | |

After the elections in 2019 the Assembly controlled by the Fidesz–KDNP party alliance which has 12 councillors, versus 2 Jobbik, 2 Hungarian Socialist Party (MSZP), 2 Our Homeland Movement (Mi Hazánk), 1 Momentum Movement and 1 Democratic Coalition (DK) councillors.

=== 2014 ===
The Assembly elected at the 2014 local government elections, is made up of 20 counselors, with the following party composition:

Summary of the 12 October 2014 election results
| Party | Votes | % | +/- | Seats | +/- | Seats % |
|---|---|---|---|---|---|---|
| Fidesz–KDNP | 36,165 | 48.45 | ▼5.53 | 11 | ▼1 | 55.00 |
| Hungarian Socialist Party (MSZP) | 16,254 | 21.78 | ▼5.32 | 5 | ▼1 | 25.00 |
| Jobbik | 13,922 | 18.65 | ▲6.67 | 4 | ▲2 | 20.00 |
| Politics Can Be Different (LMP) | 2,956 | 3.96 | | 0 | ±0 | 0 |
| Democratic Coalition (DK) | 2,327 | 3.12 | | 0 | ±0 | 0 |
| Nagycsaládok Ruzsa | 2,196 | 2.94 | | 0 | ±0 | 0 |
| Together (Együtt) | 822 | 1.10 | | 0 | ±0 | 0 |
| Total | 77,431 | 100.0 | | 20 | 0 | |
| Voter turnout | | 45.41 | ▼3.60 | | | |

After the elections in 2014 the Assembly controlled by the Fidesz–KDNP party alliance which has 11 councillors, versus 5 Hungarian Socialist Party (MSZP) and 4 Jobbik councillors.

=== 2010 ===
The Assembly elected at the 2010 local government elections, is made up of 20 counselors, with the following party composition:

Summary of the 3 October 2010 election results
| Party | Votes | % | +/- | Seats | +/- | Seats % |
|---|---|---|---|---|---|---|
| Fidesz–KDNP | 43,712 | 53.98 | ▲. | 12 | ▼8 | 60.00 |
| Hungarian Socialist Party (MSZP) | 21,944 | 27.10 | ▼. | 6 | ▼10 | 30.00 |
| Jobbik | 9,698 | 11.98 | | 2 | ▲2 | 10.00 |
| Association of Urban Builders (Városépítők) | 3,671 | 4.53 | | 0 | ±0 | 0 |
| Civil Alliance for Makó (PSZM) | 1,958 | 2.42 | | 0 | ±0 | 0 |
| Total | 84,017 | 100.0 | | 20 | ▼20 | |
| Voter turnout | | 49.01 | | | | |

After the elections in 2010 the Assembly controlled by the Fidesz–KDNP party alliance which has 12 councillors, versus 6 Hungarian Socialist Party (MSZP) and 2 Jobbik councillors.

== Presidents of the Assembly ==
So far, the presidents of the Csongrád-Csanád County Assembly have been:

- 1990–1998 István Lehmann, Hungarian Socialist Party (MSZP)
- 1998–2006 József Frank, Fidesz
- 2006–2014 Anna Magyar, Fidesz–KDNP
- 2014–2019 Béla Kakas, Fidesz–KDNP
- since 2019 László Gémes, Fidesz–KDNP
