= Pest County Assembly =

Local legislative body of Pest county

Pest County Assembly Pest Megyei Közgyűlés

Type
- Type: County Council

History
- Founded: 1990

Leadership
- President: István Szabó, Fidesz–KDNP since 12 October 2014
- Vice-president: Ferenc Wentzel; Tibor Szerenka

Structure
- Seats: 46 councillors
- Political groups: Administration: Fidesz–KDNP (21); Other parties (25): Momentum (10); Our Homeland (8); DK (7)
- Length of term: five years

Elections
- Last election: 9 June 2024
- Next election: 2029

Meeting place
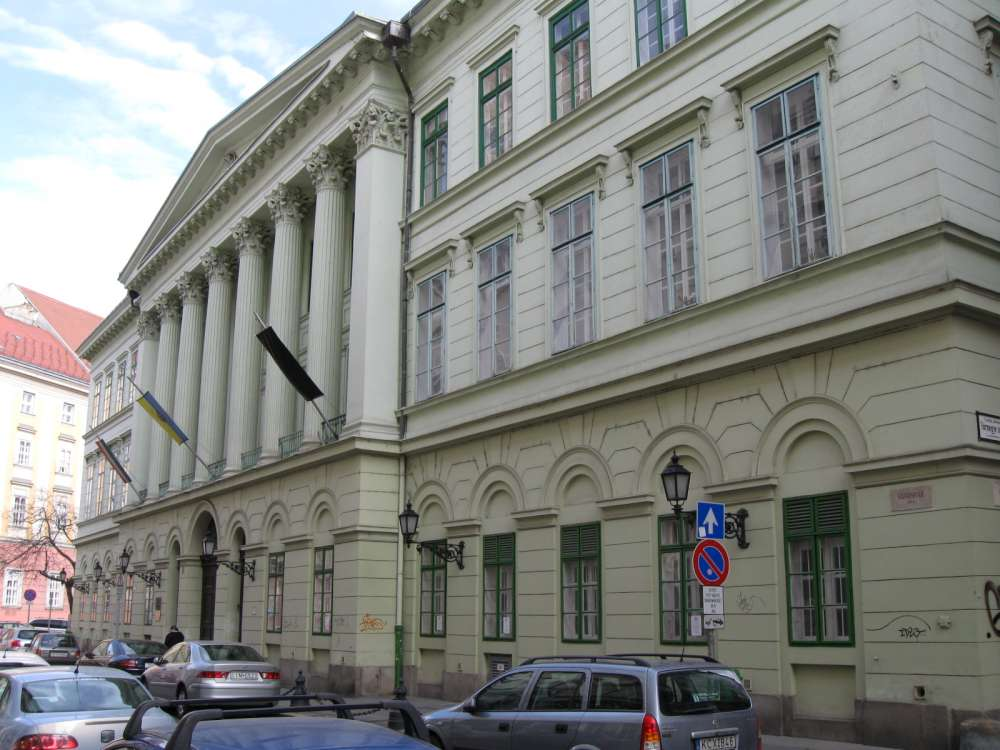
- County Hall, Budapest

Website
- pestmegye.hu

The Pest County Assembly (Hungarian: Pest Megyei Közgyűlés) is the local legislative body of Pest County, in the Central Hungary in Hungary.

== Composition ==
Deputies in Pest County Assembly
Key to parties Hungarian Socialist Party (MSZP) Democratic Coalition (DK) Alliance of Free Democrats (SZDSZ) Politics Can Be Different (LMP) Momentum Movement (Momentum) Jobbik Fidesz (Fidesz–KDNP): Fidesz-MKDSZ-KPE alliance (2002); Fidesz-KDNP alliance (from 2006); Christian Democratic People's Party (KDNP) Hungarian Democratic Forum (MDF) Independent Smallholders, Agrarian Workers and Civic Party (FKgP): FKgP-MIÉP alliance (1994); Hungarian Justice and Life Party (MIÉP): MIÉP-KDNP-METÉSZ-KSZ alliance (1998); Independent / Others: PMFPSZ (1998); Independent Mayors for the County (FPM) (2002); Life for Years Club Association (Életet az éveknek) National Association of Municipalities of Small Villages and Small Settlements (KÖSZ)
Period	Distribution	Seats
1994-1998	24 / 12 / 7 / 8 / 9 / 14 / 3 / 3	80
1998-2002	23 / 6 / 30 / 8 / 6 / 5 / 2	80
2002-2006	38 / 6 / 27 / 5 / 2 / 2	80
2006-2010	28 / 5 / 43 / 4	80
2010–2014	10 / 26 / 7	43
2014–2019	5 / 4 / 3 / 23 / 8	43
2019–2024	7 / 9 / 4 / 24	44
2024–2029	7 / 10 / 21 / 8	46

=== 2024 ===
The Assembly elected at the 2024 local government elections, is made up of 46 counselors, with the following party composition:

Summary of the 9 June 2024 election results
Party	Votes	%	+/-	Seats	+/-	Seats %
Fidesz–KDNP	255,330	45.64	▼5.96	21	▼3	45.65
Momentum Movement (Momentum)	116,461	20.82	▲1.20	10	▲1	21.74
Our Homeland Movement (MH)	96,506	17.25		8	▲8	17.39
Democratic Coalition (DK)	91,204	16.30	▲1.40	7	0	15.22
Total	559,501	100.0		46	▲2	
Voter turnout		57.79	▲12.50			

After the elections in 2024 the Assembly has no party majority with 21 Fidesz–KDNP party alliance councillors, 10 Momentum Movement, 8 Our Homeland Movement (MH) and 7 Democratic Coalition (DK) councillors.

=== 2019 ===
The Assembly elected at the 2019 local government elections, is made up of 44 counselors, with the following party composition:

Summary of the 13 October 2019 election results
Party	Votes	%	+/-	Seats	+/-	Seats %
Fidesz–KDNP	220,290	51.60	▲2.70	24	▲1	54.55
Momentum Movement (Momentum)	83,768	19.62		9	▲9	20.45
Democratic Coalition (DK)	63,618	14.90	▲6.59	7	▲3	15.91
Jobbik	39,478	9.25	▼8.99	4	▼4	9.09
Hungarian Socialist Party (MSZP)	19,746	4.63	▼7.49	0	▼5	0
Total	444,115	100.0		44	▲1	
Voter turnout		45.29	▲4.12			

After the elections in 2019 the Assembly controlled by the Fidesz–KDNP party alliance which has 24 councillors, versus 9 Momentum Movement, 7 Democratic Coalition (DK) and 4 Jobbik councillors.

=== 2014 ===
The Assembly elected at the 2014 local government elections, is made up of 43 counselors, with the following party composition:

Summary of the 12 October 2014 election results
Party	Votes	%	+/-	Seats	+/-	Seats %
Fidesz–KDNP	183,277	48.90	▼9.84	23	▼3	53.49
Jobbik	68,381	18.24	▲1.58	8	▲1	18.60
Hungarian Socialist Party (MSZP)	45,440	12.12	▼12.48	5	▼5	11.63
Democratic Coalition (DK)	31,155	8.31		4	▲4	9.30
Politics Can Be Different (LMP)	30,050	8.02		3	▲3	6.98
Together (Együtt)	16,499	4.40		0	±0	0
Total	389,020	100.0		43	0	
Voter turnout		41.17	▼3.43			

After the elections in 2014 the Assembly controlled by the Fidesz–KDNP party alliance which has 23 councillors, versus 8 Jobbik, 5 Hungarian Socialist Party (MSZP), 4 Democratic Coalition (DK) and 3 Politics Can Be Different (LMP) councillors.

=== 2010 ===
The Assembly elected at the 2010 local government elections, is made up of 43 counselors, with the following party composition:

Summary of the 3 October 2010 election results
Party	Votes	%	+/-	Seats	+/-	Seats %
Fidesz–KDNP	230,611	58.74	▲.	26	▼17	60.47
Hungarian Socialist Party (MSZP)	96,590	24.60	▼.	10	▼18	23.26
Jobbik	65,391	16.66		7	▲7	16.28
Total	410,779	100.0		43	▼37	
Voter turnout		44.60				

After the elections in 2010 the Assembly controlled by the Fidesz–KDNP party alliance which has 26 councillors, versus 10 Hungarian Socialist Party (MSZP) and 7 Jobbik councillors.

== Presidents of the Assembly ==
So far, the presidents of the Pest County Assembly have been:

- 1990–1994 János Inczédy, Christian Democratic People's Party (KDNP)
- 1994–1998 Géza Schmidt, KÖSZ
- 1998–2002 András T. Mészáros, Fidesz
- 2002–2006 Imre Szabó, Hungarian Socialist Party (MSZP)
- 2006–2014 Lajos Szűcs, Fidesz–KDNP
- since 2014 István Szabó, Fidesz–KDNP
