= Bács-Kiskun County Assembly =

Bács-Kiskun County Assembly Bács-Kiskun Vármegyei Közgyűlés

Type
- Type: County Council

History
- Founded: 1990

Leadership
- President: László Rideg, Fidesz–KDNP since 12 October 2014
- Kornél Mák; Norbert Vedelek

Structure
- Seats: 23 councillors
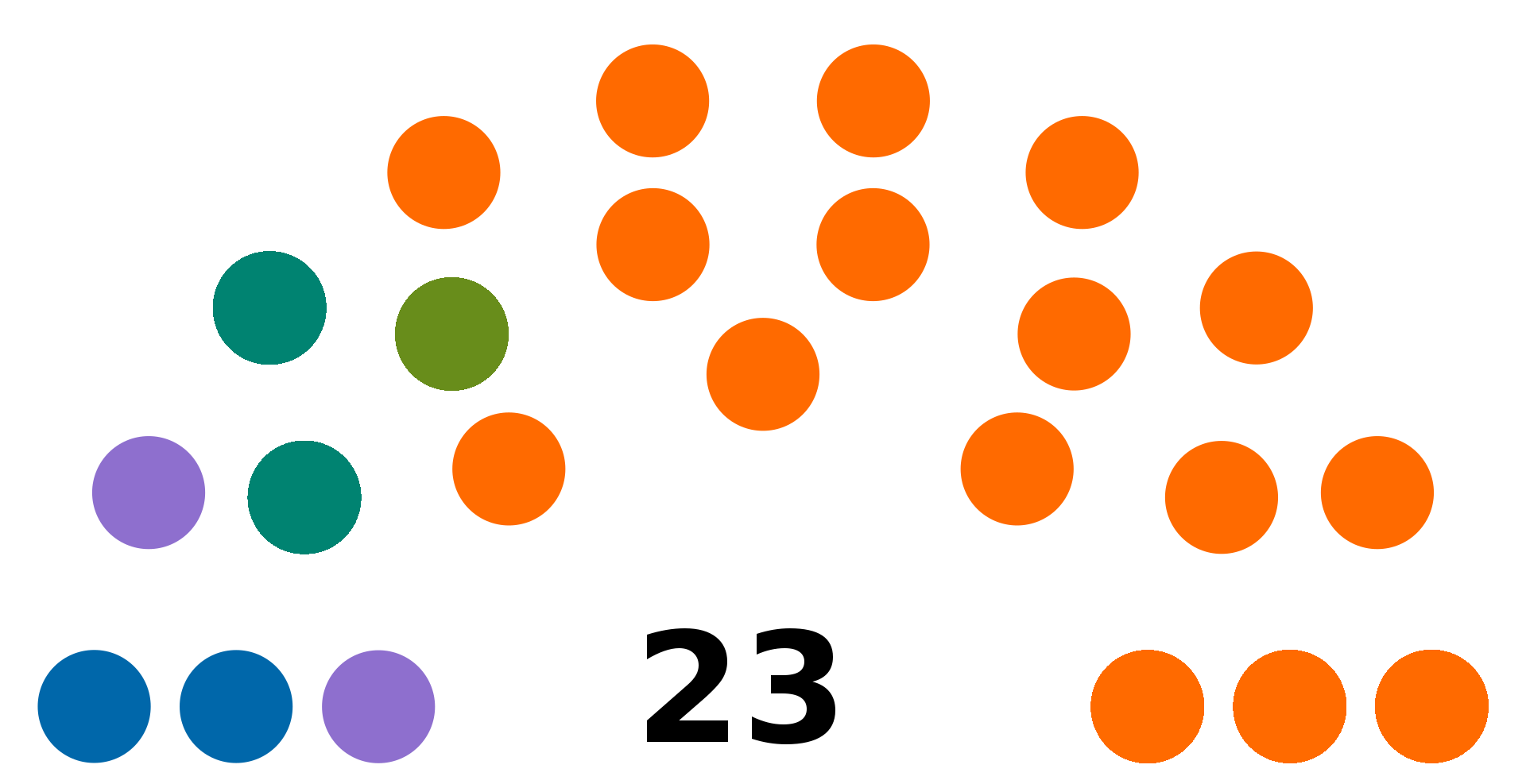
- Political groups: Administration: Fidesz–KDNP (16); Other parties (7): Momentum (2); DK (2); Jobbik (2); Our Homeland (1)
- Length of term: five years

Elections
- Last election: 9 June 2024
- Next election: 2029

Meeting place
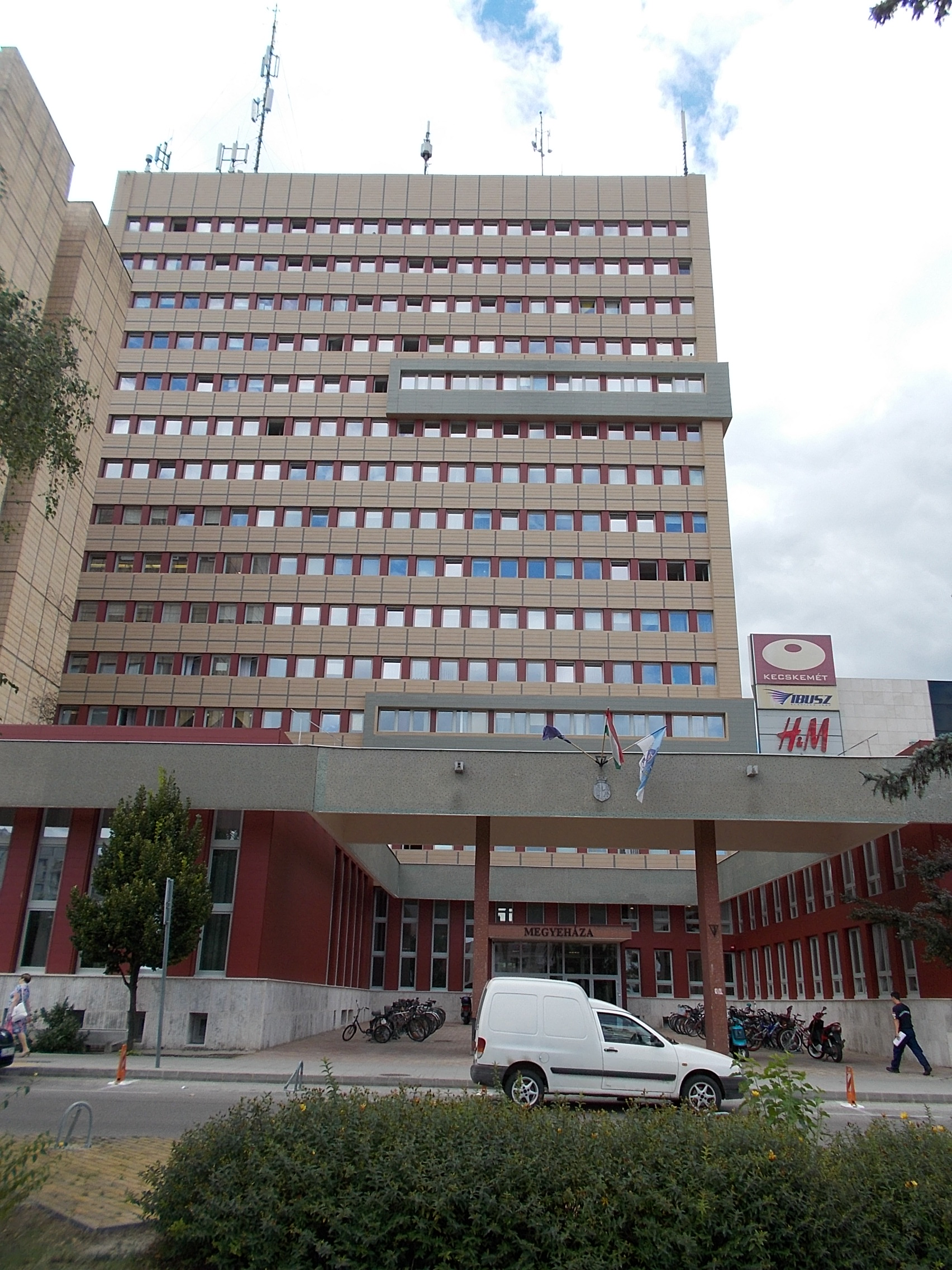
- County Hall, Kecskemét

Website
- bacskiskun.hu

The Bács Kiskun County Assembly (Hungarian: Bács-Kiskun Megyei Közgyűlés) is the local legislative body of Bács-Kiskun County in the Southern Great Plain, in Hungary.

== Composition ==
Deputies in Bács-Kiskun County Assembly
Key to parties Hungarian Workers' Party (Munkáspárt) Hungarian Socialist Party (MSZP) Democratic Coalition (DK) Alliance of Free Democrats (SZDSZ) Politics Can Be Different (LMP) Momentum Movement (Momentum) Jobbik Fidesz (Fidesz–KDNP): Fidesz-MDF alliance (1998); Fidesz-KDNP-NF alliance (2006); Fidesz-KDNP alliance (from 2010); Christian Democratic People's Party (KDNP): KDNP-MDF alliance (1994); Hungarian Democratic Forum (MDF): MDF-KDNP alliance (1994); Independent Smallholders, Agrarian Workers and Civic Party (FKgP) Our Homeland Movement (Mi Hazánk) Independent / Others: Country Association of Pensioner (1994); Urban Civil Circle (VPK) (1994); Civil Association (1998); Alliance of Civilian Circles (1998); National Association of Large Families (NOE)
Period	Distribution	Seats
1994–1998	2 / 13 / 8 / 3 / 4 / 3 / 10 / 1 / 1 / 1	46
1998–2002	14 / 2 / 18 / 9 / 2 / 1	46
2002–2006	23 / 2 / 18 / 3	46
2006–2010	14 / 3 / 28 / 1	46
2010–2014	4 / 1 / 16 / 3	24
2014–2019	3 / 1 / 1 / 14 / 5	24
2019–2024	2 / 2 / 2 / 16 / 1	23
2024–2029	2 / 2 / 14 / 5	23

=== 2019 ===
The Assembly elected at the 2019 local government elections, is made up of 23 counselors, with the following party composition:

Summary of the 13 October 2019 election results
Party	Votes	%	+/-	Seats	+/-	Seats %
Fidesz–KDNP	87,225	60.42	▲4.68	16	▲2	69.57
Momentum Movement (Momentum)	14,999	10.39		2	▲2	8.70
Democratic Coalition (DK)	13,877	9.61	▲3.70	2	▲1	8.70
Jobbik	13,845	9.59	▼10.62	2	▼3	8.70
Our Homeland Movement (Mi Hazánk)	7,915	5.48		1	▲1	4.35
Hungarian Socialist Party (MSZP)	6,507	4.51	▼7.49	0	▼3	0
Total	149,401	100.0		23	▼1	
Voter turnout		44.54	▲1.38			

After the elections in 2019 the Assembly controlled by Fidesz–KDNP party alliance which has 16 councillors, versus 2 for Jobbik, 2 for the Democratic Coalition (DK), 2 for the Momentum Movement and 1 for Our Homeland Movement (Mi Hazánk) councillors.

=== 2014 ===
The Assembly elected at the 2014 local government elections, is made up of 24 counselors, with the following party composition:

Summary of the 12 October 2014 election results
Party	Votes	%	+/-	Seats	+/-	Seats %
Fidesz–KDNP	79,721	55.74	▼7.65	14	▼2	58.33
Jobbik	28,911	20.21	▲6.50	5	▲2	20.83
Hungarian Socialist Party (MSZP)	18,024	12.60	▼4.91	3	▼1	12.50
Democratic Coalition (DK)	8,458	5.91		1	▲1	4.17
Politics Can Be Different (LMP)	7,908	5.53	▼0.13	1	0	4.17
Total	148,713	100.0		24	0	
Voter turnout		43.16	▼2.11			

After the elections in 2014 the Assembly controlled by the Fidesz–KDNP party alliance which has 16 councillors, versus 5 Jobbik, 3 Hungarian Socialist Party (MSZP), 1 Democratic Coalition (DK) and 1 Politics Can Be Different (LMP) councillors.

=== 2010 ===
The Assembly elected at the 2010 local government elections, is made up of 24 counselors, with the following party composition:

Summary of the 3 October 2010 election results
Party	Votes	%	+/-	Seats	+/-	Seats %
Fidesz–KDNP	96,203	63.39	▲.	16	▼12	66.67
Hungarian Socialist Party (MSZP)	25,569	17.51	▼.	4	▼10	16.67
Jobbik	20,814	13.71		3	▲3	12.50
Politics Can Be Different (LMP)	8,189	5.40		1	▲1	4.17
Total	157,348	100.0		24	▼22	
Voter turnout		45.27				

After the elections in 2010 the Assembly controlled by the Fidesz–KDNP party alliance which has 16 councillors, versus 4 Hungarian Socialist Party (MSZP), 3 Jobbik and 1 Politics Can Be Different (LMP) councillors.

== Presidents of the Assembly ==
So far, the presidents of the Bács-Kiskun County Assembly have been:

- 1990–1994 Mihály Kőtörő, Alliance of Free Democrats (SZDSZ)
- 1994–1998 László Balogh, Hungarian Socialist Party (MSZP)
- 1998–2002 Sándor Endre, Fidesz–MDF
- 2002–2006 László Balogh, Hungarian Socialist Party (MSZP)
- 2006–2014 Gábor Bányai, Fidesz–KDNP
- since 2014 László Rideg, Fidesz–KDNP
