= Pál Völner =

Hungarian jurist and politician

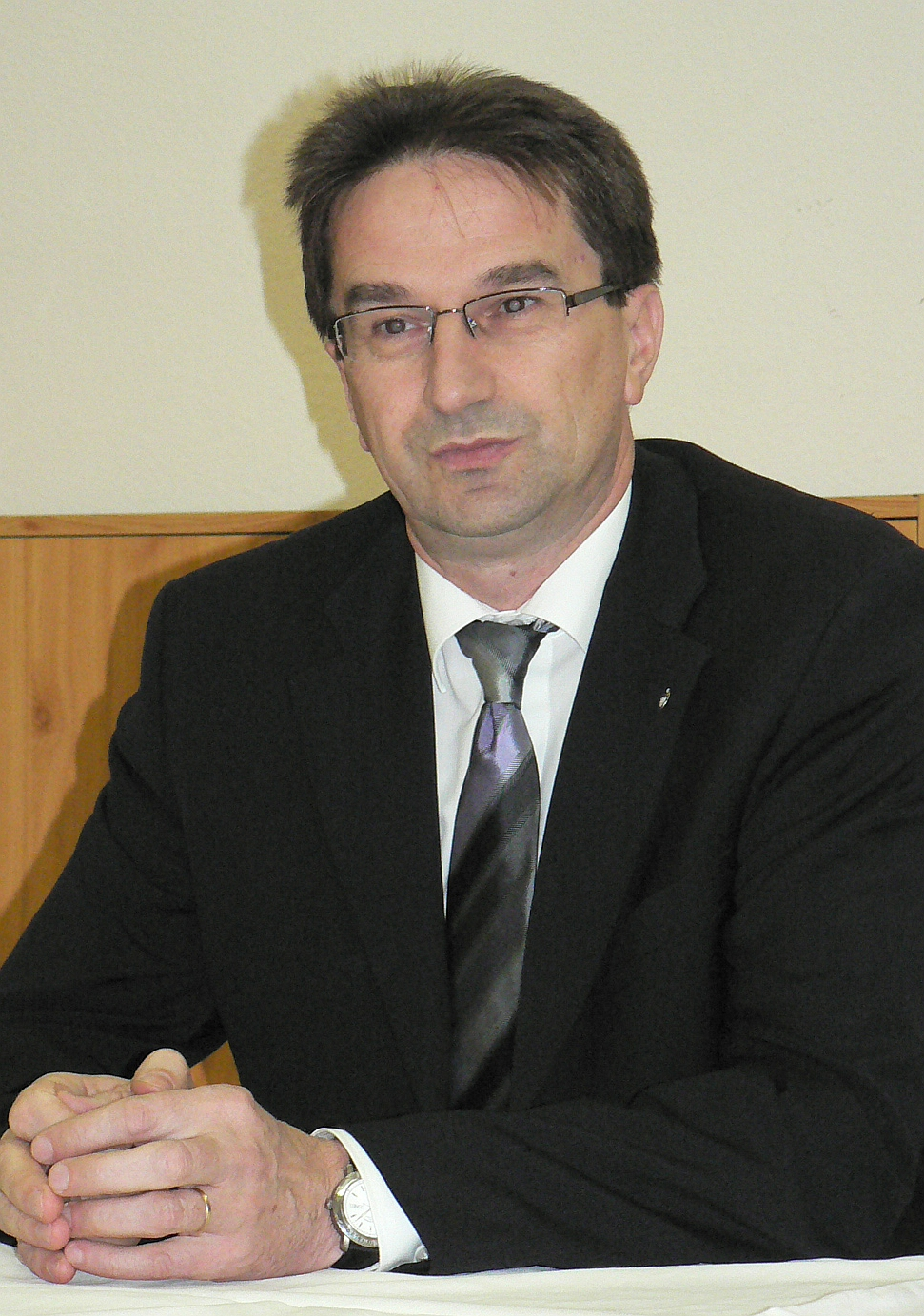

Member of the National Assembly
- In office 14 May 2010 – 1 May 2022

Personal details
- Born: 30 November 1962 (age 63) Győr, Hungary
- Party: Fidesz
- Profession: jurist, politician

Dr. Pál Völner (born 30 November 1962) is a Hungarian jurist and politician, a former member of the National Assembly (MP) for Komárom (Komárom-Esztergom County Constituency IV) from 2010 to 2014, and for Esztergom (Komárom-Esztergom County Constituency II) from 2014 to 2022. He served as Secretary of State for Infrastructure in the Ministry of National Development between 2 June 2010 and 5 June 2014. He was a vice-chairman of the parliament's Economic Committee from 2014 to 2015. Völner served as Secretary of State for Justice from 9 October 2015 to 8 December 2021.

== Professional career ==
Völner was born in Győr on 30 November 1962. He finished his secondary studies at the Benedictine High School of Pannonhalma in 1981. He earned a degree of law at the Faculty of Law of the Eötvös Loránd University in 1988. he completed a course at the Law Training Institute of the same university in 1990.

He started his professional career as a legal rapporteur in the Pest County branch of the Office of Taxation and Financial Control (APEH) in 1988. He was a legal adviser at the Eternit works in the asbestos factory in Nyergesújfalu from 1988 to 1990. He worked as a lawyer in Nyergesújfalu between 1990 and 1998. He opened his own law firm there, functioning in this capacity from 1998 to 2006.

== Political career ==
Völner was a member of the local representative body of Nyergesújfalu from 1998 to 2010, as a member of the Fidesz. He was elected a member of the Komárom-Esztergom County Assembly during the 2006 Hungarian local elections. He served as president of the county assembly from 2006 to 2010. Völner was appointed president of the local branch of the Fidesz in Komárom-Esztergom County in 2006. He presided the branch in Esztergom too since 2015.

From 2006 he was the president of the Komárom-Esztergom County Enterprise Development Foundation and the chairman of the Regional Development Council. He was a member of the Central Transdanubia Regional Development Council and the Local and Regional Congress of the Council of Europe. From 2007 he was the president of the Regional Integrated Vocational Training Center. Völner also served as president of the Hungarian National Shipping Association (MAHOSZ) from 2015 to 2021.

Völner was elected a Member of Parliament for Komárom (Komárom-Esztergom County Constituency IV) in the 2010 Hungarian parliamentary election. He served as Secretary of State for Infrastructure in the Ministry of National Development between 2 June 2010 and 5 June 2014, during the Second Orbán Government. He was elected MP for Esztergom (Komárom-Esztergom County Constituency II) in the 2014 Hungarian parliamentary election. He functioned as vice-chairman of the Economic Committee from June 2014 to October 2015, also presiding its Subcommittee for Transport from November 2014 to October 2015, and was also a member of the Subcommittee on Economic Development and Competitiveness in the same period. Völner was appointed ministerial commissioner for the development of Komárom-Esztergom County in June 2015. He was installed as Secretary of State for Justice in October 2015, replacing Róbert Répássy. He functioned in this capacity in the third and fourth Orbán governments. Völner was re-elected MP for Esztergom during the 2018 Hungarian parliamentary election. He resigned as secretary of state in December 2021 amid a corruption scandal. He was succeeded by Róbert Répássy.

== Corruption charge ==
The so-called "Schadl–Völner case" began in early 2021, when the National Defense Service (NVSZ) began to eavesdrop on a corrupt official of the National Tax and Customs Administration (NAV). In early December 2021, the Attorney General's Office initiated the waiver of Völner's immunity on suspicion of bribery. According to the suspicion – abusing his supervisory, official and administrative powers – Völner regularly accepted millions HUF from György Schadl, the president of the Hungarian Court Bailiffs Chamber (MBVK). The case has twelve suspects at the time the immunity was initiated.

Völner resigned as Secretary of State for Justice on 8 December 2021. In a press release sent through his lawyer after his suspicion, Völner said he was cooperating with the authorities to investigate. However, he retained his position as a Member of Parliament and a member of the Fidesz parliamentary group until the end of the parliamentary term in May 2022. On 14 December 2021, the parliamentary immunity of Pál Völner was waived. He then voluntarily testified before the Central Investigative Prosecutor's Office. According to the statement of the Prosecutor General Péter Polt, Völner's act raises a well-founded suspicion of accepting an official bribery committed in a criminal association, in a business-like and continuous manner, by a senior official otherwise abusing his official position for advantage.
