= Nógrád County Assembly =

Nógrád County Assembly Nógrád Megyei Közgyűlés

Type
- Type: County Council

History
- Founded: 1990

Leadership
- President: Nándor Skuczi, Fidesz–KDNP since 12 October 2014
- Vice-presidents: János Barna; Ferenc Bablena

Structure
- Seats: 15 councillors
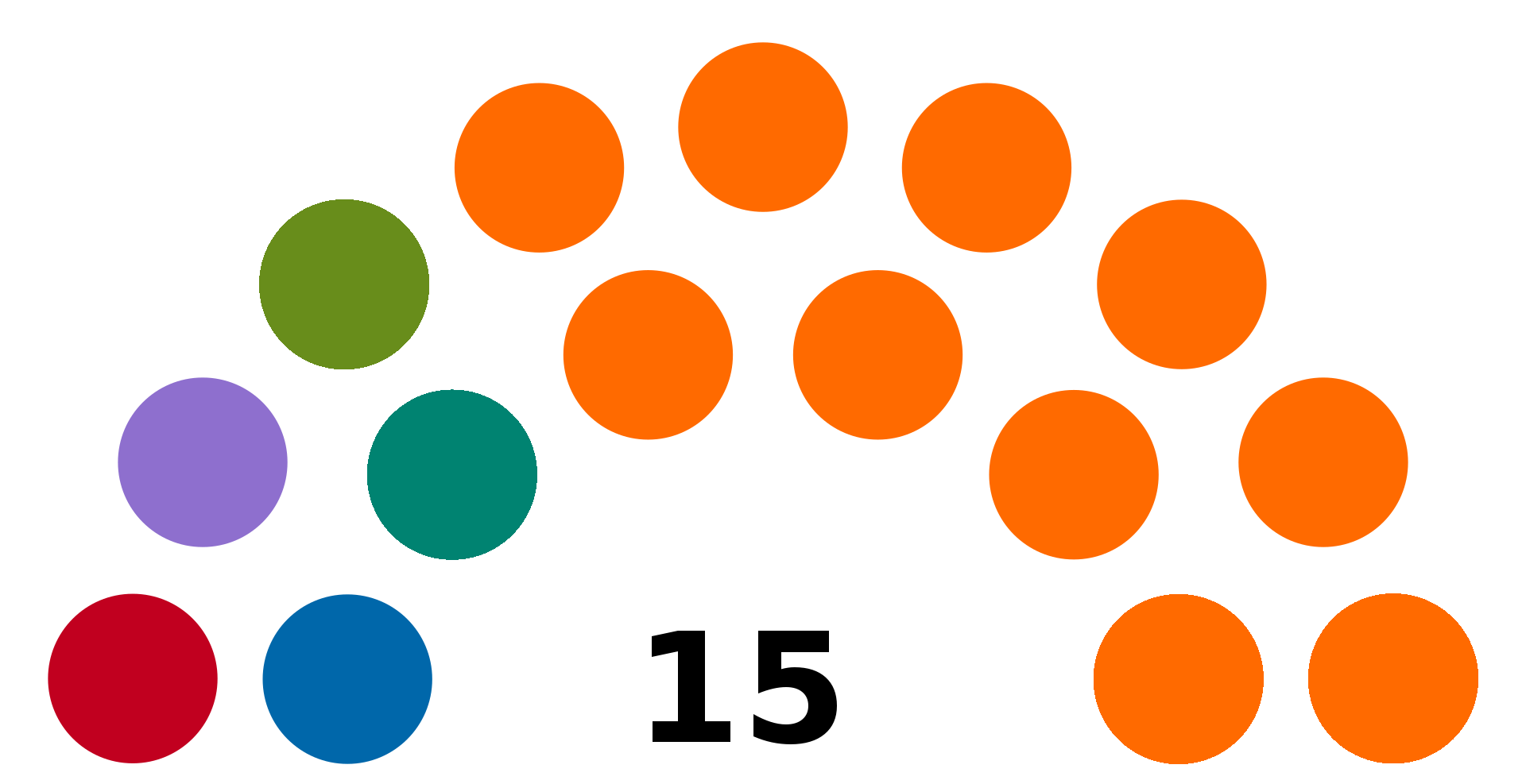
- Political groups: Administration: Fidesz–KDNP (10); Other parties (5): DK (1); Jobbik (1); Momentum (1); MSZP (1); Our Homeland (1)
- Length of term: five years

Elections
- Last election: 9 June 2024
- Next election: 2029

Meeting place
- Salgótarján

Website
- nograd.hu

The Nógrád County Assembly (Hungarian: Nógrád Megyei Közgyűlés) is the local legislative body of Nógrád County in the Northern Hungary, in Hungary.

== Composition ==
=== 2024-2029 ===
Party	Seats	Change	Group leader
Fidesz–KDNP	10 / 15	Steady	Nándor Skuczi
Our Homeland Movement (Mi Hazánk)	3 / 15	▲	
Democratic Coalition (DK)	1 / 15	0	Ferdinánd Egyed
Momentum Movement	1 / 15	Steady	Dóra Gyuris

=== 2019–2024 period ===
The Assembly elected at the 2019 local government elections, is made up of 15 counselors, with the following party composition:

Party	Seats	Change	Group leader
Fidesz–KDNP	10 / 15	▲1	Nándor Skuczi
Democratic Coalition (DK)	1 / 15	0	Ferdinánd Egyed
Jobbik	1 / 15	▼2	István Cseresznyés
Momentum Movement	1 / 15	New	Dóra Gyuris
Hungarian Socialist Party (MSZP)	1 / 15	▼1	Ervin Borenszki
Our Homeland Movement (Mi Hazánk)	1 / 15	New	Dávid Dócs

After the elections in 2019 the Assembly controlled by the Fidesz–KDNP party alliance which has 10 councillors, versus 1 Democratic Coalition (DK), 1 Jobbik, 1 Momentum Movement, 1 Hungarian Socialist Party (MSZP), and 1 Our Homeland Movement (Mi Hazánk) councillors.

=== 2014–2019 period ===
The Assembly elected at the 2014 local government elections, is made up of 15 counselors, with the following party composition:

Party	Seats	Change	Group leader
Fidesz–KDNP	9 / 15	▼1	Nándor Skuczi
Jobbik	3 / 15	▲1	Szilárd Palotai
Hungarian Socialist Party (MSZP)	2 / 15	▼1	László Boldvai
Democratic Coalition (DK)	1 / 15	New	Sándor Szedlák

After the elections in 2014 the Assembly controlled by the Fidesz–KDNP party alliance which has 9 councillors, versus 3 Jobbik, 2 Hungarian Socialist Party (MSZP) and 1 Democratic Coalition (DK) councillors.

=== 2010–2014 period ===
The Assembly elected at the 2010 local government elections, is made up of 15 counselors, with the following party composition:

Party	Seats	Group leader
Fidesz–KDNP	10 / 15	Zsolt Becsó
Hungarian Socialist Party (MSZP)	3 / 15	Ervin Borenszki
Jobbik	2 / 15	Szilárd Palotai

After the elections in 2010 the Assembly controlled by the Fidesz–KDNP party alliance which has 10 councillors, versus 3 Hungarian Socialist Party (MSZP) and 2 Jobbik councillors.

== Presidents of the Assembly ==
So far, the presidents of the Nógrád County Assembly have been:

- 1990–1994 Ferenc Korill, Alliance of Free Democrats (SZDSZ)
- 1994–1998 Sándor Smitnya, Alliance of Free Democrats (SZDSZ)
- 1998–2002 Zsolt Becsó, Fidesz–MKDSZ-MDNP
- 2002–2006 Ottó Dóra, Hungarian Socialist Party (MSZP)
- 2006–2014 Zsolt Becsó, Fidesz–KDNP
- since 2014 Nándor Skuczi, Fidesz–KDNP
