= Jász-Nagykun-Szolnok County Assembly =

General Assembly of Jász-Nagykun-Szolnok County Jász-Nagykun-Szolnok Megyei Közgyűlés
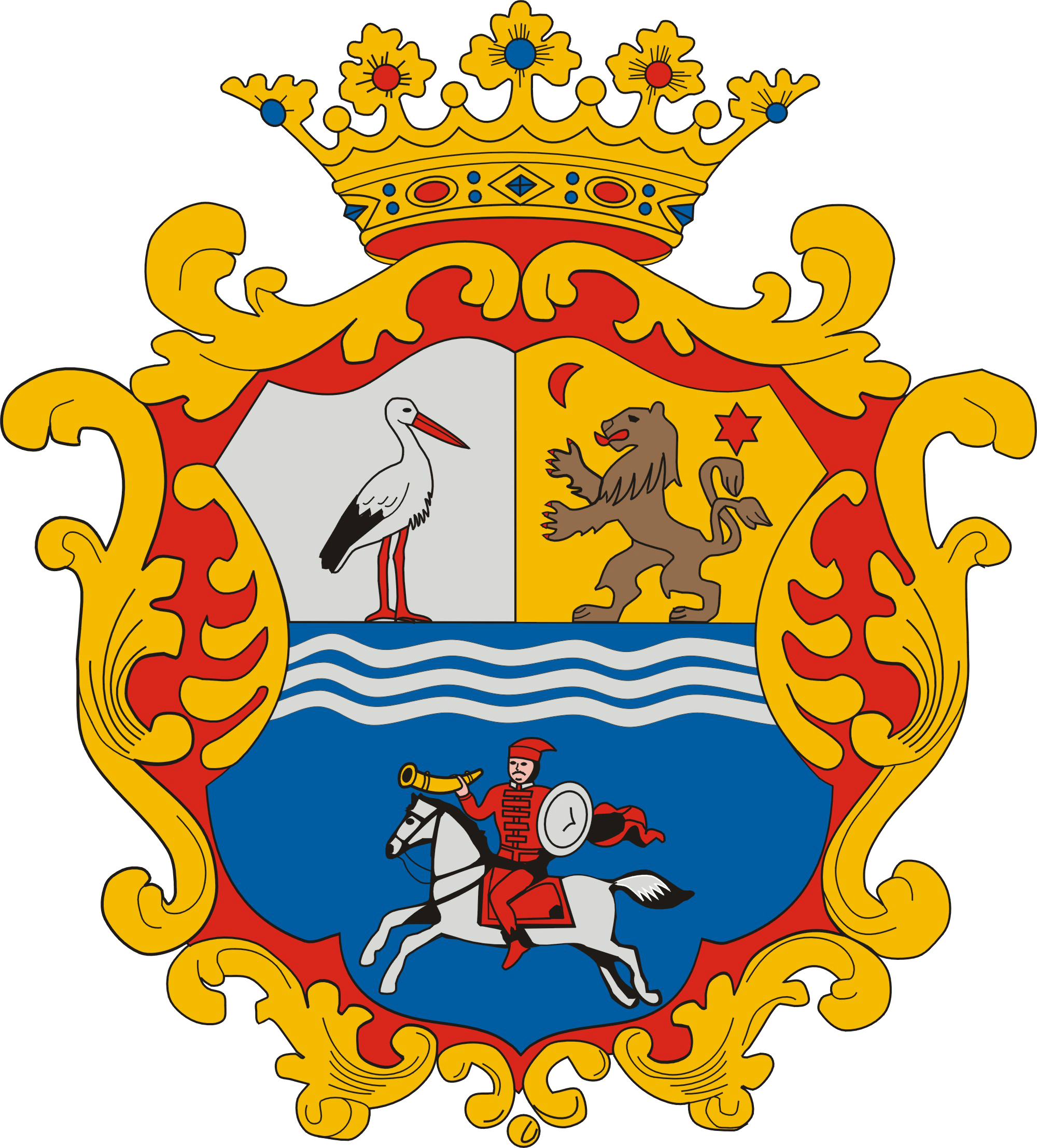

Type
- Type: County Council

History
- Founded: 1990

Leadership
- President: Imre Hubai, Fidesz–KDNP since 13 October 2019

Structure
- Seats: 18 councillors
- Political groups: Administration: Fidesz–KDNP (11); Other parties (7): Jobbik (3); DK (1); Momentum (1); MSZP (1); Our Homeland (1)
- Length of term: five years

Elections
- Last election: 9 June 2024
- Next election: 2029

Meeting place
- Szolnok

Website
- jnszm.hu

The General Assembly of Jász-Nagykun-Szolnok County (Hungarian: Jász-Nagykun-Szolnok Megyei Közgyűlés) is the local legislative body of Jász-Nagykun-Szolnok County in the Northern Great Plain in Hungary.

== Composition ==
=== 2024–2029 period ===
The Assembly elected at the 2024 local government elections, is made up of 18 counselors, with the following party composition:

Party	Seats	Change	Group leader
Fidesz–KDNP	11 / 18	0	Imre Hubai
Our Homeland Movement (Mi Hazánk)	3 / 18	▲2	István Boros
Democratic Coalition (DK)	2 / 18	▲1	Dávid Mészáros
Jobbik	1 / 18	▼2	László György Lukács
Momentum Movement	1 / 18	0	Ferenc Bozsik

After the elections in 2024 the Assembly controlled by the Fidesz–KDNP party alliance which has 11 councillors, versus 3 Our Homeland Movement (Mi Hazánk), 2 Democratic Coalition (DK), 1 Jobbik, and 1 Momentum Movement councillors.

=== 2019–2024 period ===
The Assembly elected at the 2019 local government elections, is made up of 18 counselors, with the following party composition:

Party	Seats	Change	Group leader
Fidesz–KDNP	11 / 18	0	Imre Hubai
Jobbik	3 / 18	▼2	Attila Révi
Democratic Coalition (DK)	1 / 18	▲1	Ildikó Mária Stefán
Momentum Movement	1 / 18	New	Kata Kővári
Hungarian Socialist Party (MSZP)	1 / 18	▼1	Endre Rózsa
Our Homeland Movement (Mi Hazánk)	1 / 18	New	István Boros

After the elections in 2019 the Assembly controlled by the Fidesz–KDNP party alliance which has 11 councillors, versus 3 Jobbik, 1 Democratic Coalition (DK), 1 Momentum Movement, 1 Hungarian Socialist Party (MSZP), and 1 Our Homeland Movement (Mi Hazánk) councillors.

=== 2014–2019 period ===
The Assembly elected at the 2014 local government elections, is made up of 18 counselors, with the following party composition:

Party	Seats	Change	Group leader
Fidesz–KDNP	11 / 18	0	Sándor Kovács
Jobbik	5 / 18	▲1	Tamás Csányi
Hungarian Socialist Party (MSZP)	2 / 18	▼3	Endre Rózsa
Democratic Coalition (DK)	1 / 18	New	Róbert Horváth

After the elections in 2014 the Assembly controlled by the Fidesz–KDNP party alliance which has 11 councillors, versus 5 Jobbik, 2 Hungarian Socialist Party (MSZP) and 1 Democratic Coalition (DK) councillors.

=== 2010–2014 period ===
The Assembly elected at the 2010 local government elections, is made up of 18 counselors, with the following party composition:

Party	Seats	Group leader
Fidesz–KDNP	11 / 18	Sándor Kovács
Hungarian Socialist Party (MSZP)	5 / 18	Katalin Tokajiné Demecs
Jobbik	4 / 18	Attila Szecsei

After the elections in 2010 the Assembly controlled by the Fidesz–KDNP party alliance which has 11 councillors, versus 5 Hungarian Socialist Party (MSZP) and 4 Jobbik councillors.

== Presidents of the Assembly ==
So far, the presidents of the Jász-Nagykun-Szolnok County Assembly have been:

- 1990–1994 Lajos Boros, Hungarian Democratic Forum (MDF)
- 1994–1998 Imre Iváncsik, Hungarian Socialist Party (MSZP)
- 1998–2002 Lajos Búsi, Fidesz
- 2002–2006 István Tokár, Hungarian Socialist Party (MSZP)
- 2006–2010 Andor Fejér, Fidesz–KDNP
- 2010–2018 Sándor Kovács, Fidesz–KDNP
- 2018–2019 Miklós Piroska, Fidesz–KDNP
- since 2019 Imre Hubai, Fidesz–KDNP
