= Baranya County Assembly =

Local legislative body of Baranya County

Baranya County Council
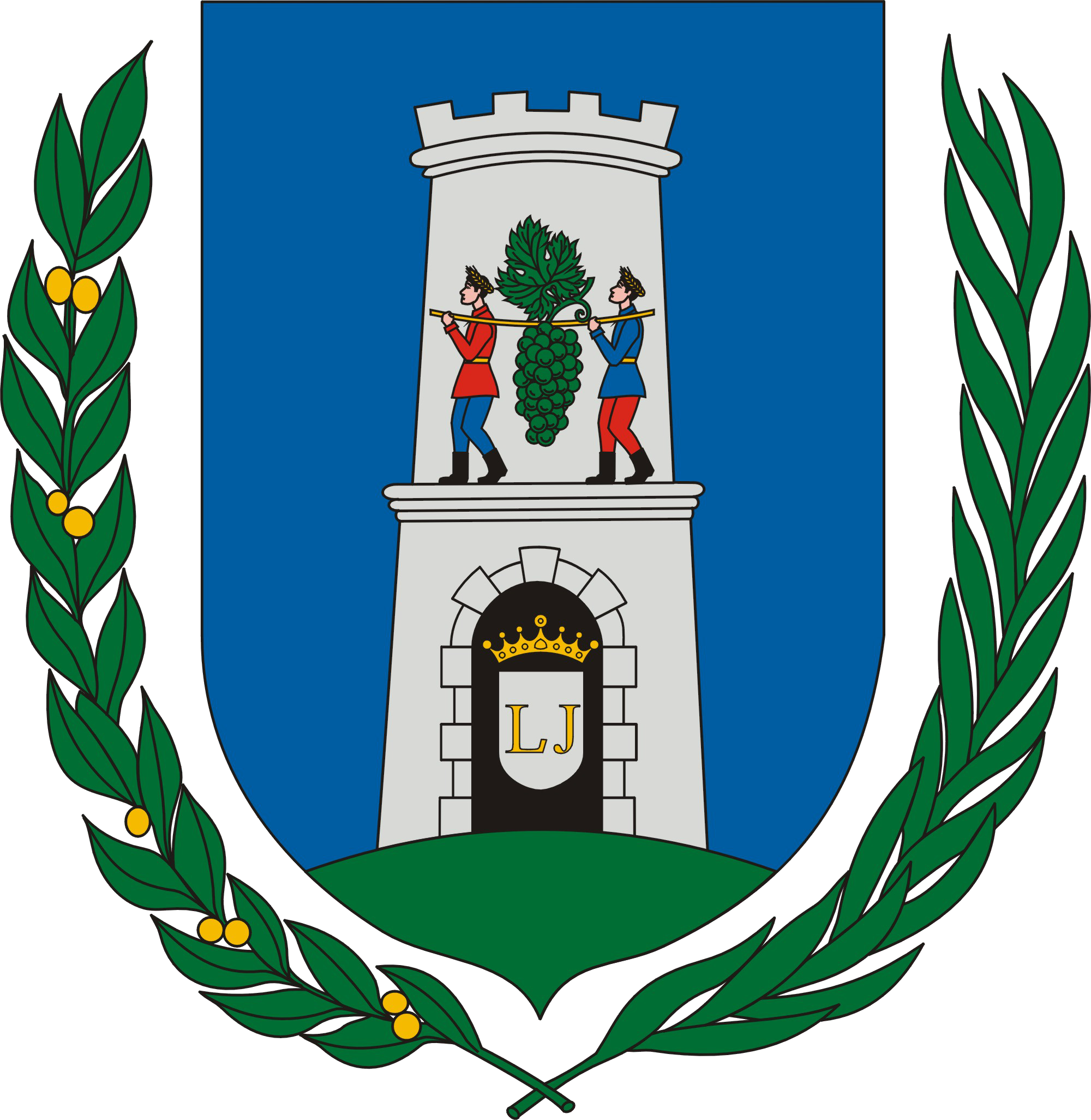

Type
- Type: County Council

Leadership
- President of the Council: László Őri, Fidesz
- Vice-President of the Council: Péter Dunai since 13 October 2019

Structure
- Seats: 18 councillors
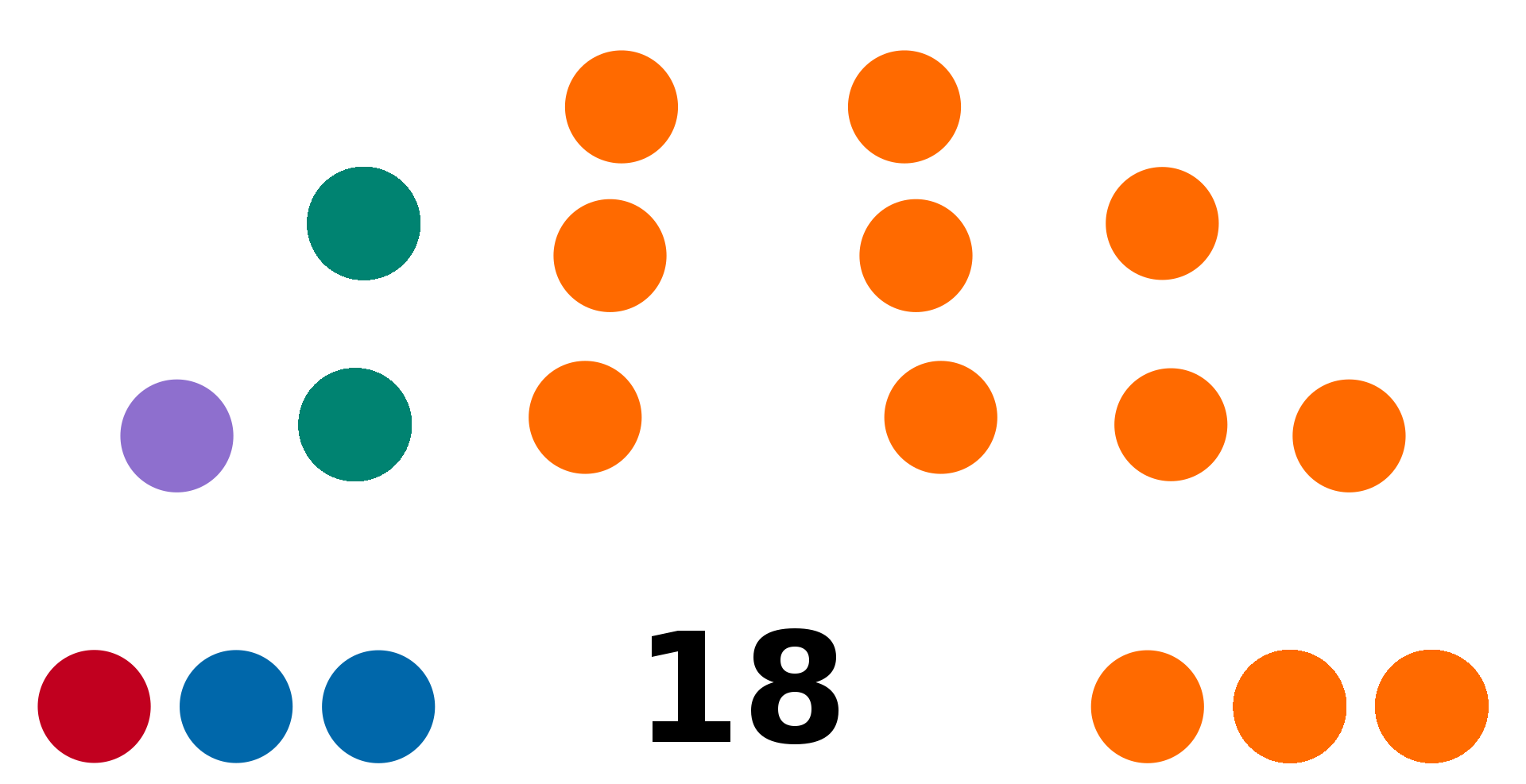
- Political groups: Administration Fidesz (12) Other parties Jobbik (2) Democratic Coalition (2) Momentum Movement (1) MSZP (1)
- Committees: Financial and Standing Orders committee Land Development committee Pre-Decisional Application committee Preserving Baranya County's Values committee
- Length of term: 5 years

Elections
- Voting system: Proportional representation
- Last election: 9 June 2024
- Next election: 2029

Website
- www.baranya.hu/koezgyulesi-tagok

The Baranya County Council is the local legislative body of Baranya County in South-West Hungary. After the elections in 2019, it consists of 18 councillors, and is controlled by the Fidesz which has 12 councillors, versus 2 Jobbik, 2 Democratic Coalition, 1 MSZP and 1 Momentum Movement councillors.

== Latest election ==
2019 Baranya County Council election
Party	Candidates	Seats	Change	Votes	%	±%
Fidesz	18	12	▲1	55,501	57.05	▲5.96
DK	18	2	▲1	12,011	12.35	▲7.05
Jobbik	13	2	▼1	8,904	19.17	▼7.42
MSZP	9	1	▼2	8,100	8.33	▼7.74
Momentum	8	1	▲1	8,675	8.92	▲8.92

== Council history ==
Year	Control
1994	No Overall Control
1998	MSZP
2002	MSZP
2006	Fidesz
2010	Fidesz
2014	Fidesz
2019	Fidesz
