= Komárom-Esztergom County Assembly =

Komárom-Esztergom County Assembly Komárom-Esztergom Megyei Közgyűlés
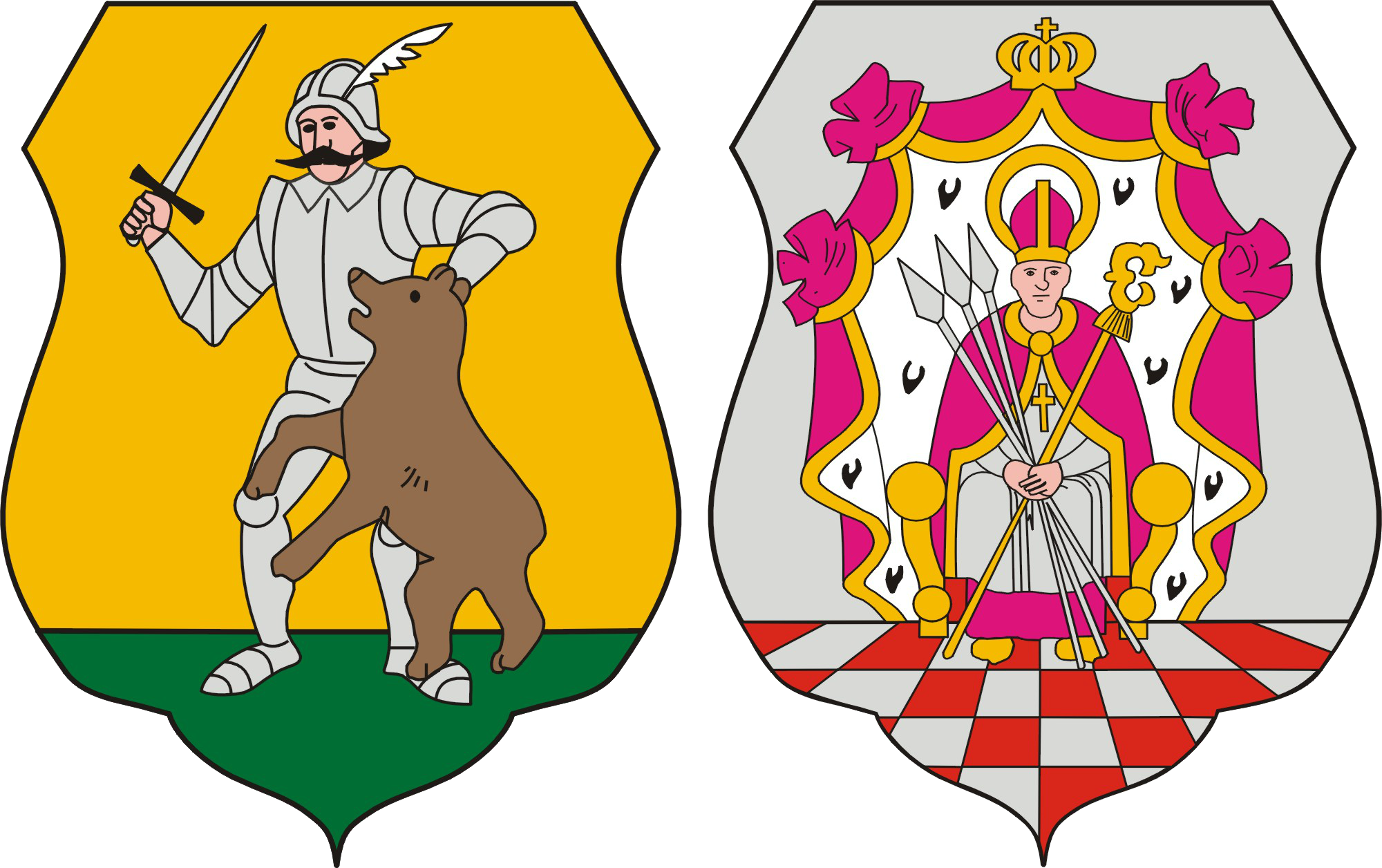

Type
- Type: County Council

History
- Founded: 1990

Leadership
- President: György Popovics, Fidesz–KDNP since 3 October 2010
- Tibor Borsó; Balázs Steindl; Etelka Romanek

Structure
- Seats: 15 councillors
- Political groups: Administration: Fidesz–KDNP (9); Other parties (6): DK-Jobbik-MSZP-Momentum-MMM (6)
- Length of term: five years

Elections
- Last election: 13 October 2019
- Next election: 2024

Meeting place
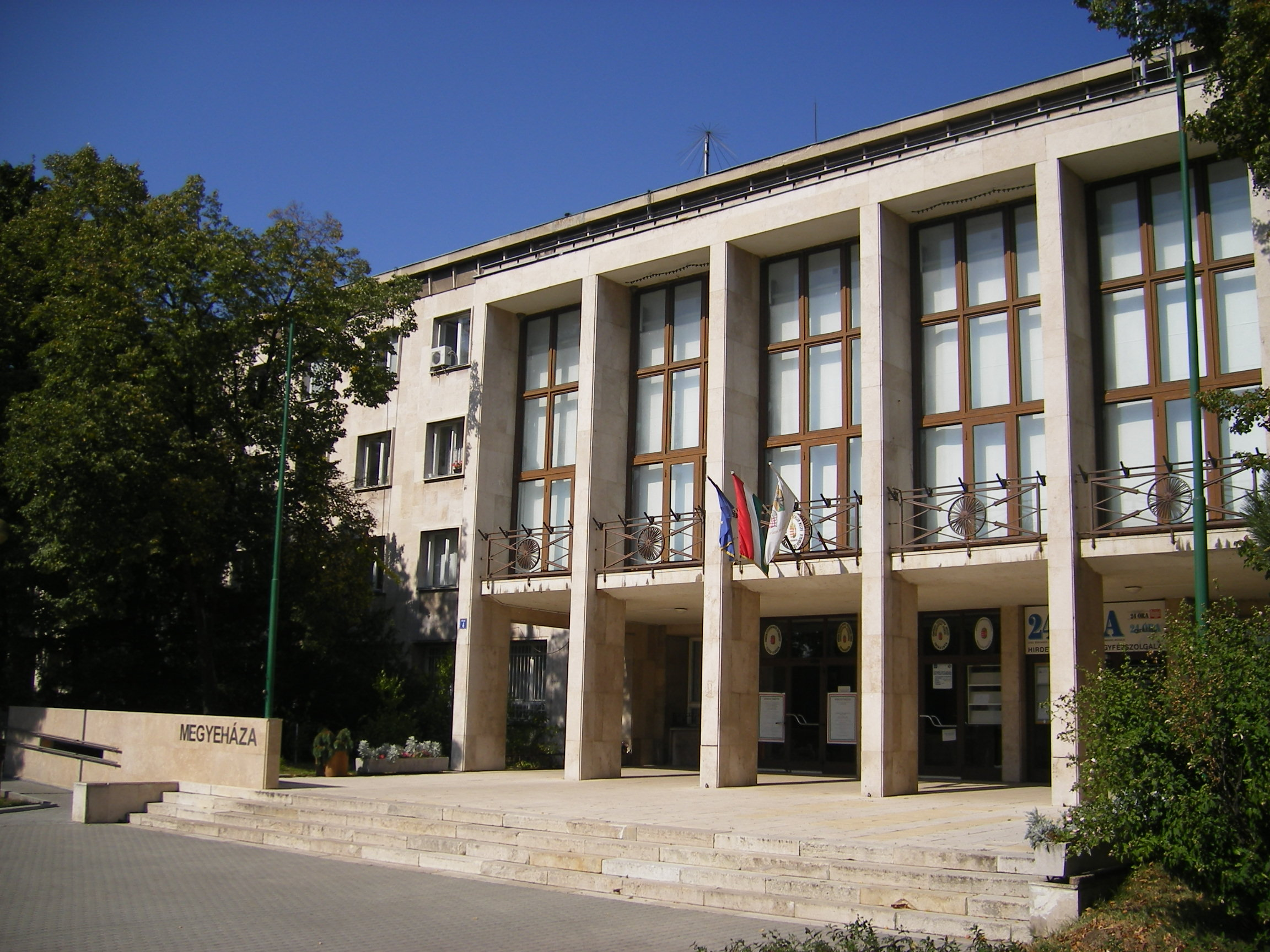
- County Hall, Tatabánya

Website
- kemoh.hu

The Komárom-Esztergom County Assembly (Hungarian: Komárom-Esztergom Megyei Közgyűlés) is the local legislative body of Komárom-Esztergom County in the Central Transdanubia, in Hungary.

== Composition ==
Deputies in Komárom-Esztergom County Assembly
Key to parties Hungarian Workers' Party (Munkáspárt) Hungarian Socialist Party (MSZP) Democratic Coalition (DK): DK-Jobbik-MSZP-Momentum-Dialogue alliance (2019); Alliance of Free Democrats (SZDSZ) Momentum Movement (Momentum) Jobbik Fidesz (Fidesz–KDNP): Fidesz-MDF alliance (2002); Fidesz-KDNP alliance (from 2006); Christian Democratic People's Party (KDNP) Hungarian Democratic Forum (MDF) Independent Smallholders, Agrarian Workers and Civic Party (FKgP) Independent / Others: Csolnoki Német NKE (1994); Mayors for their Villages (1998, 2002, 2006); Mayors Association (1998); Association of Bakony regional Local Governments (BÖSZ) (2002); Electoral Alliance for Clean Public life (Tiszta Közéletért) (2002); Association of Mayor and Nationalities (PGMNE) (2002); Representation Election Association (KÉVE) (2002)
Period	Distribution	Seats
1994–1998	1 / 14 / 7 / 4 / 4 / 4 / 5 / 1	40
1998–2002	14 / 3 / 15 / 4 / 2 / 2	40
2002–2006	19 / 2 / 12 / 3 / 1 / 1 / 1 / 1	40
2006–2010	15 / 1 / 21 / 1 / 2	40
2010–2014	4 / 9 / 2	15
2014–2019	2 / 1 / 9 / 3	15
2019–2024	6 / 9	15

=== 2019 ===
The Assembly elected at the 2019 local government elections, is made up of 15 counselors, with the following party composition:

Summary of the 13 October 2019 election results
Party	Votes	%	+/-	Seats	+/-	Seats %
Fidesz–KDNP	47,823	57.22	▲4.53	9	0	60.00
DK–Jobbik–MSZP–Momentum–Dialogue	35,752	42.78		6	±0	40.00
Total	86,838	100.0		15	0	
Voter turnout		44.72	▲0.91			

After the elections in 2019 the Assembly controlled by the Fidesz–KDNP party alliance which has 9 councillors, versus 6 DK-Jobbik-Hungarian Socialist Party (MSZP)-Momentum Movement-Dialogue for Hungary (Párbeszéd) councillors.

List of seat winners

On the Fidesz–KDNP list:
1. György Popovics (president)
2. Balázs Steindl (vice-president)
3. Tibor Borsó (vice-president)
4. Bálint Turi
5. György Nagy
6. Zoltán László Balogh
7. Mihály József Gyuga
8. Gergely István Szerencsés
9. Bence Vajda

On the DK–Jobbik–MSZP–Momentum–Dialogue list:

1. Erik Konczer
2. Zsuzsanna Barbora
3. Judit Popovics
4. Ferenc Lévai
5. Vilmos Pálinkás
6. Máté Fodor

=== 2014 ===
The Assembly elected at the 2014 local government elections, is made up of 15 counselors, with the following party composition:

Summary of the 12 October 2014 election results
Party	Votes	%	+/-	Seats	+/-	Seats %
Fidesz–KDNP	43,772	52.69	▼4.66	9	0	60.00
Jobbik	14,922	17.96	▲4.48	3	▲1	20.00
Hungarian Socialist Party (MSZP)	12,435	14.97	▼11.70	2	▼2	13.33
Democratic Coalition (DK)	8,065	9.71		1	▲1	6.67
Together (Együtt)	3,878	4.67		0	±0	0
Total	86,145	100.0		15	0	
Voter turnout		43.81	▼3.22			

After the elections in 2014 the Assembly controlled by the Fidesz–KDNP party alliance which has 9 councillors, versus 3 Jobbik, 2 Hungarian Socialist Party (MSZP) and 1 Democratic Coalition (DK) councillors.

=== 2010 ===
The Assembly elected at the 2010 local government elections, is made up of 15 counselors, with the following party composition:

Summary of the 3 October 2010 election results
Party	Votes	%	+/-	Seats	+/-	Seats %
Fidesz–KDNP	51,226	57.35	▲.	9	▼12	60.00
Hungarian Socialist Party (MSZP)	26,050	29.16	▼.	4	▼11	26.67
Jobbik	12,044	13.48		2	▲2	13.33
Total	92,899	100.0		15	▼25	
Voter turnout		47.03				

After the elections in 2010 the Assembly controlled by the Fidesz–KDNP party alliance which has 9 councilors, versus 4 Hungarian Socialist Party (MSZP) and 2 Jobbik councilors.

== Presidents of the Assembly ==
So far, the presidents of the Komárom-Esztergom County Assembly have been:

- 1990–1998 György Kovács, Hungarian Socialist Party (MSZP)
- 1998–2002 Mózes Lázár, Fidesz
- 2002–2006 István Agócs, Hungarian Socialist Party (MSZP)
- 2006–2010 Pál Völner, Fidesz–KDNP
- since 2010 György Popovics, Fidesz–KDNP
