= Heves County Assembly =

Heves County Assembly Heves Megyei Közgyűlés

Type
- Type: County Council

History
- Founded: 1990

Leadership
- President: Attila Simon Juhász, Fidesz–KDNP since 13 October 2019

Structure
- Seats: 15 councillors
- Political groups: Administration: Fidesz–KDNP (9); Other parties (6): DK-Jobbik-MSZP-Momentum-MMM (6)
- Length of term: five years

Elections
- Last election: 13 October 2019
- Next election: 2024

Meeting place
- Eger

Website
- hevesmegye.hu

The Heves County Assembly (Hungarian: Heves Megyei Közgyűlés) is the local legislative body of Heves County in the Northern Hungary, in Hungary.

== Composition ==
=== 2019–2024 period ===
The Assembly elected at the 2019 local government elections, is made up of 15 counselors, with the following party composition:

Party	Seats	Change	Group leader
Fidesz–KDNP	9 / 15	▲1	Attila Simon Juhász
DK-Jobbik-MSZP-Momentum-MMM	6 / 15		János József Hegedüs

After the elections in 2019 the Assembly controlled by the Fidesz–KDNP party alliance which has 9 councillors, versus 6 DK-Jobbik-Hungarian Socialist Party (MSZP)-Momentum Movement-Everybody's Hungary Movement (MMM) councillors.

=== 2014–2019 period ===
The Assembly elected at the 2014 local government elections, is made up of 15 counselors, with the following party composition:

Party	Seats	Change	Group leader
Fidesz–KDNP	8 / 15	0	Róbert Szabó
Jobbik	4 / 15	▲1	Róbert Dudás
Hungarian Socialist Party (MSZP)	2 / 15	▼2	Zsolt Érsek
Democratic Coalition (DK)	1 / 15	New	János József Hegedüs

After the elections in 2014 the Assembly controlled by the Fidesz–KDNP party alliance which has 8 councillors, versus 4 Jobbik, 2 Hungarian Socialist Party (MSZP) and 1 Democratic Coalition (DK) councillors.

=== 2010–2014 period ===
The Assembly elected at the 2010 local government elections, is made up of 15 counselors, with the following party composition:

Party	Seats	Group leader
Fidesz–KDNP	8 / 15	László Horváth
Hungarian Socialist Party (MSZP)	4 / 15	Tamás Sós
Jobbik	3 / 15	Róbert Dudás

After the elections in 2010 the Assembly controlled by the Fidesz–KDNP party alliance which has 8 councillors, versus 4 Hungarian Socialist Party (MSZP) and 3 Jobbik councillors.

== Presidents of the Assembly ==
So far, the presidents of the Heves County Assembly have been:

- 1990–1998 István Jakab, Hungarian Socialist Party (MSZP)
- 1998–2010 Tamás Sós, Hungarian Socialist Party (MSZP)
- 2010 László Horváth, Fidesz–KDNP
- 2011–2019 Róbert Szabó, Fidesz–KDNP
- since 2019 Attila Simon Juhász, Fidesz–KDNP
