= Andor Fejér =

Hungarian electrical engineer and politician

Member of the National Assembly
- In office 14 May 2010 – 5 May 2014

Personal details
- Born: 25 January 1960 (age 66) Viișoara, Cluj County, Romania
- Party: Fidesz (since 1990)
- Profession: electrical engineer

Andor Fejér (born January 25, 1960) is a Hungarian electrical engineer and politician, member of the National Assembly (MP) for Kunhegyes (Jász-Nagykun-Szolnok County Constituency VII) from 2010 to 2014.

Fejér served as President of the General Assembly of Jász-Nagykun-Szolnok County between 2006 and 2010. He was a member of the Parliamentary Committee on Sustainable Development from May 14, 2010 and the Committee on Consumer Protection from March 7, 2011 until December 31, 2012.
