= Fejér County Assembly =

Local legislative body of Fejér County, Hungary

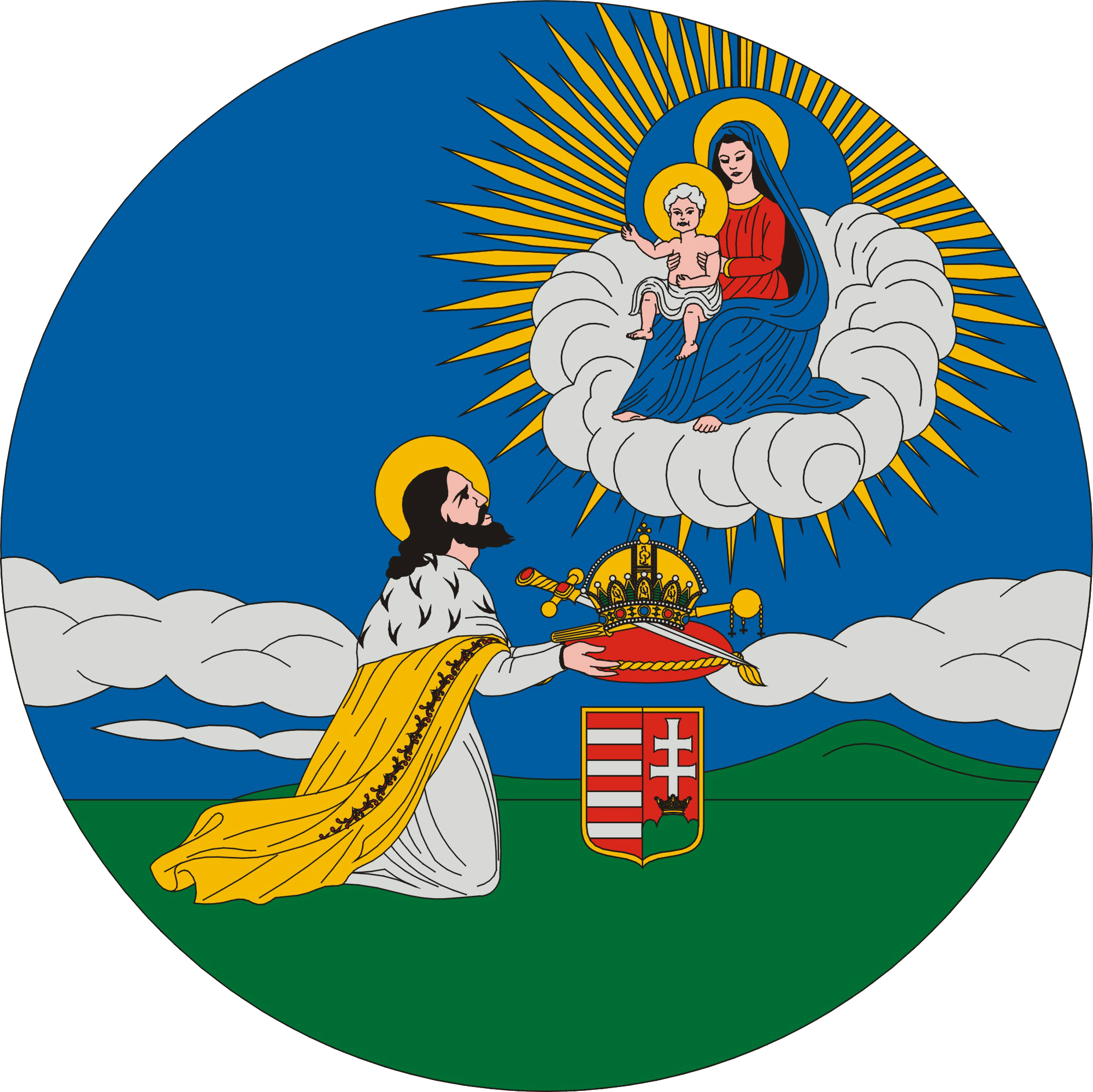

Type
- Type: County Council

Leadership
- President of the Assembly: Krisztián Molnár, Fidesz since 13 October 2019
- Vice-president of the Assembly: Károly Pálffy since 13 October 2019

Structure
- Seats: 20 councillors
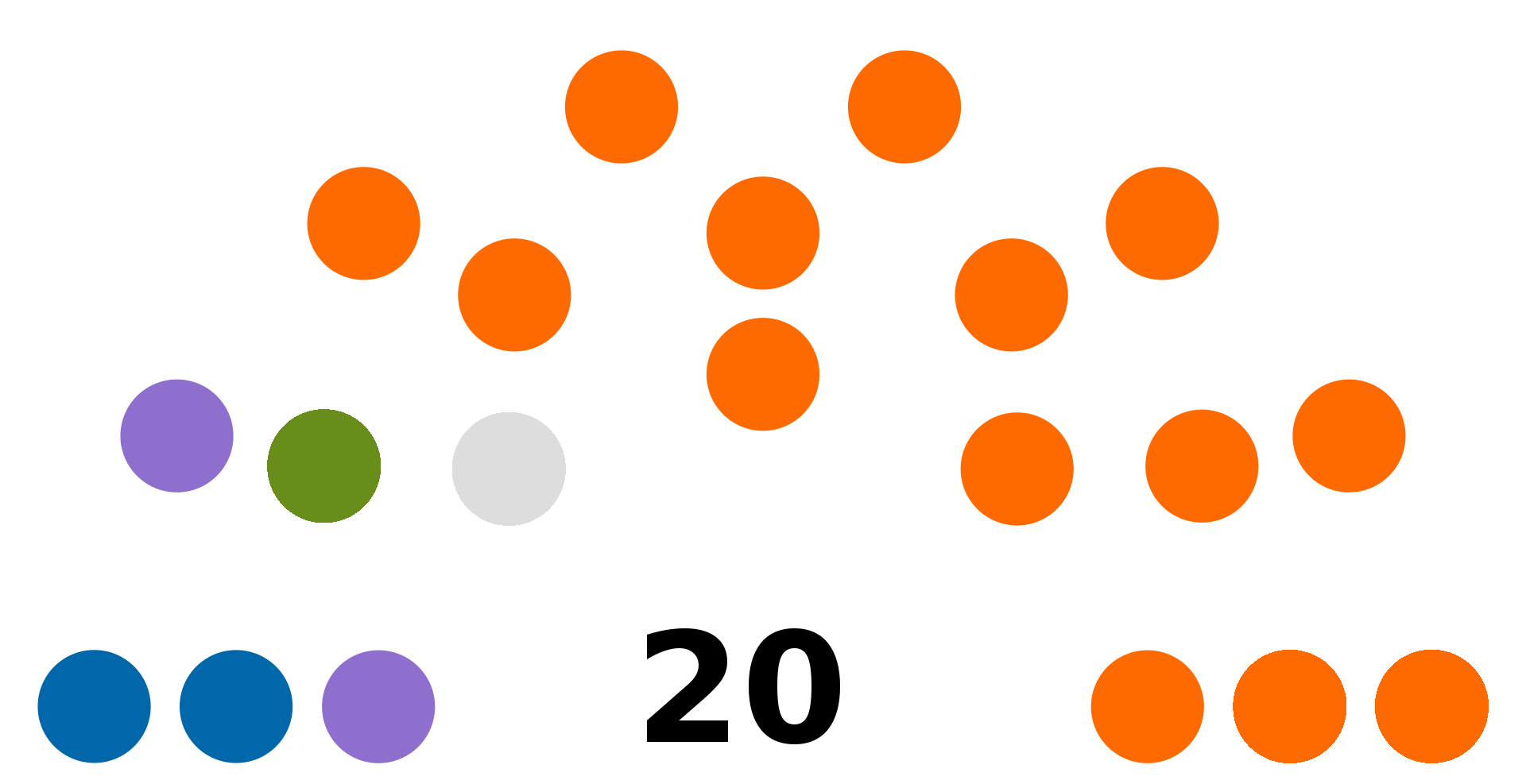
- Political groups: Administration Fidesz (14) Other parties Democratic Coalition (2) Momentum (2) Our Homeland (1) Independent (1)
- Length of term: 5 years

Elections
- Last election: 9 June 2024
- Next election: 2029

Website
- www.fejer.hu/kozgyules

The Fejér County Council is the local legislative body of Fejér County, in Hungary. After the elections in 2019, it consists of 20 councillors, and is controlled by the Fidesz which has 14 councillors, versus 2 Democratic Coalition, 2 Momentum Movement, 1 Our Homeland Movement and 1 Independent councillors.

== Sources ==
- ":: Fejér megye honlapja :". fejer.hu.
