= Győr-Moson-Sopron County Assembly =

Győr-Moson-Sopron County Council
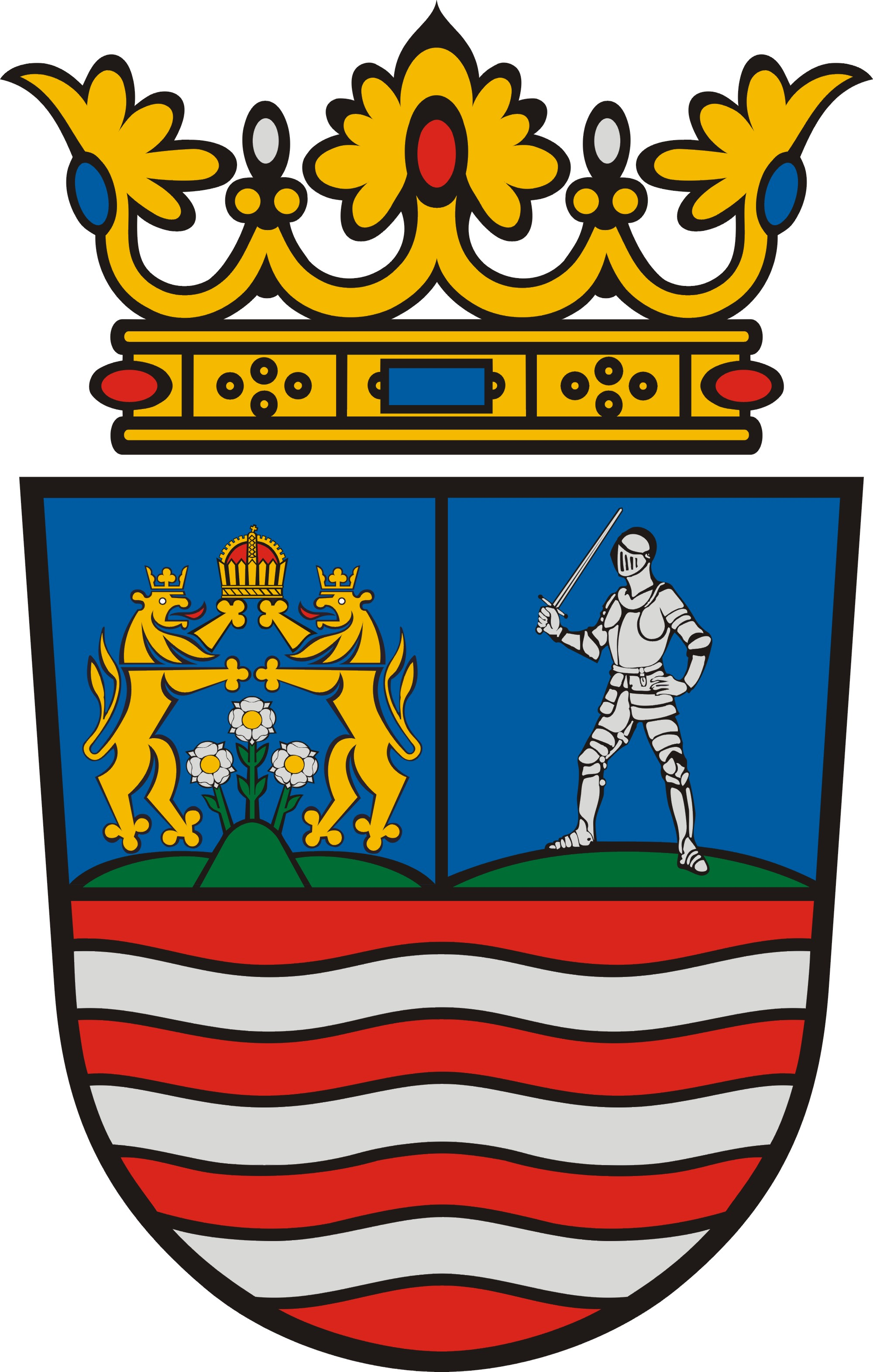

Type
- Type: County Council

Leadership
- President of the Council: Zsolt Németh, Fidesz since 13 October 2019

Structure
- Seats: 21 councillors
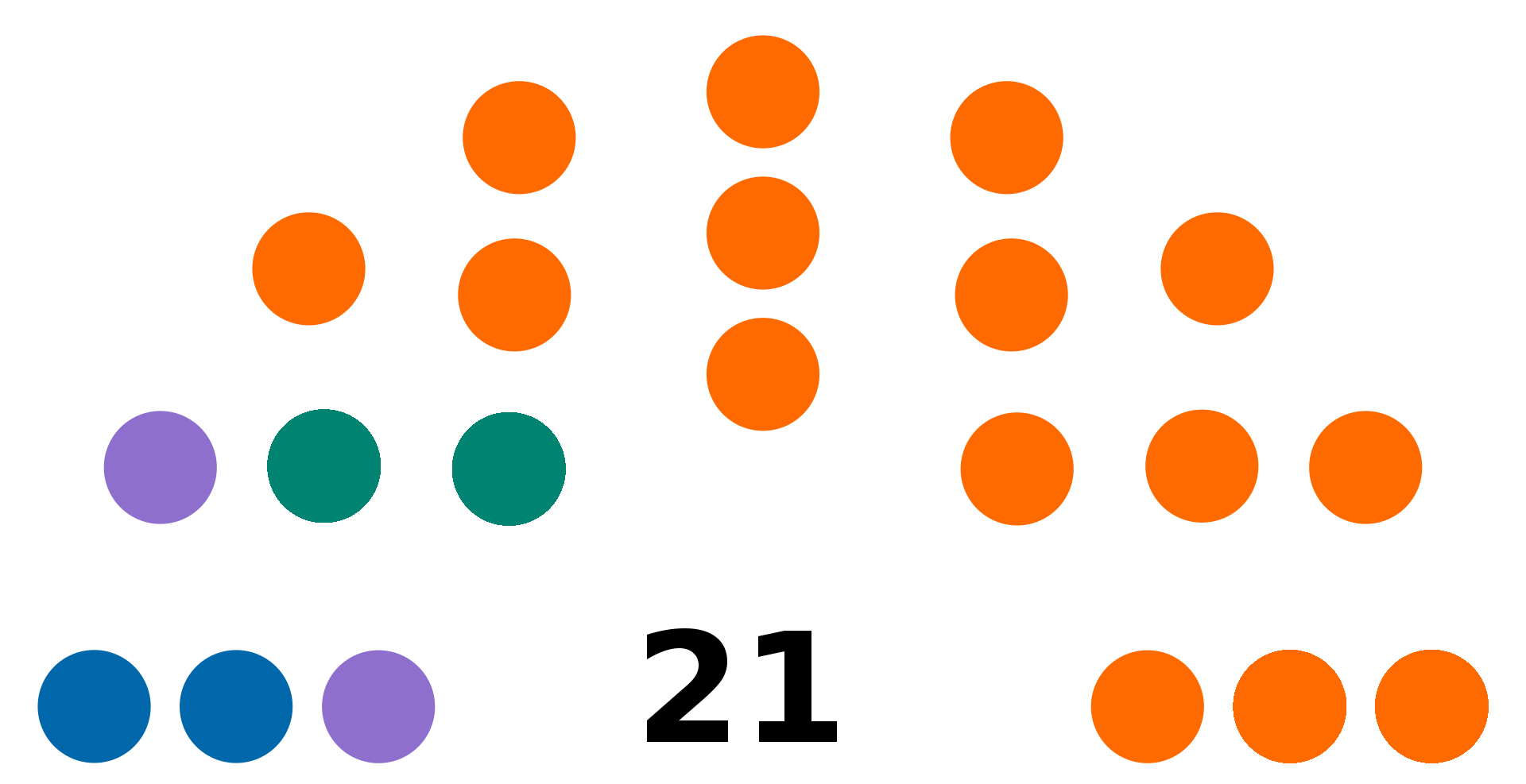
- Political groups: Administration Fidesz (15) Other parties Jobbik (2) Democratic Coalition (2) Momentum Movement (2)
- Committees: Financial and Management Committee Land Development and Ethnicities Committee Procurement Committee Incongruence and Financial Statement Controlling Committee
- Length of term: 5 years

Elections
- Last election: 13 October 2019

Website
- www.gymsmo.hu/cikk/kozgyulesenek-tagjai.html

The Győr-Moson-Sopron County Council is the local legislative body of Győr-Moson-Sopron County in Hungary. After the elections in 2019, it consists of 21 councillors, and is controlled by the Fidesz which has 15 councillors, versus 2 Jobbik, 2 Democratic Coalition, and 2 Momentum Movement councillors.
