= Hajdú-Bihar County Assembly =

Local legislative body in Hungary

Hajdú-Bihar County Council

Type
- Type: County Council

Leadership
- President of the Council: Zoltán Pajna, Fidesz since 13 October 2019
- Vice-presidents of the Council: László Bulcsu, Sándor Tasi since 13 October 2019

Structure
- Seats: 24 councillors
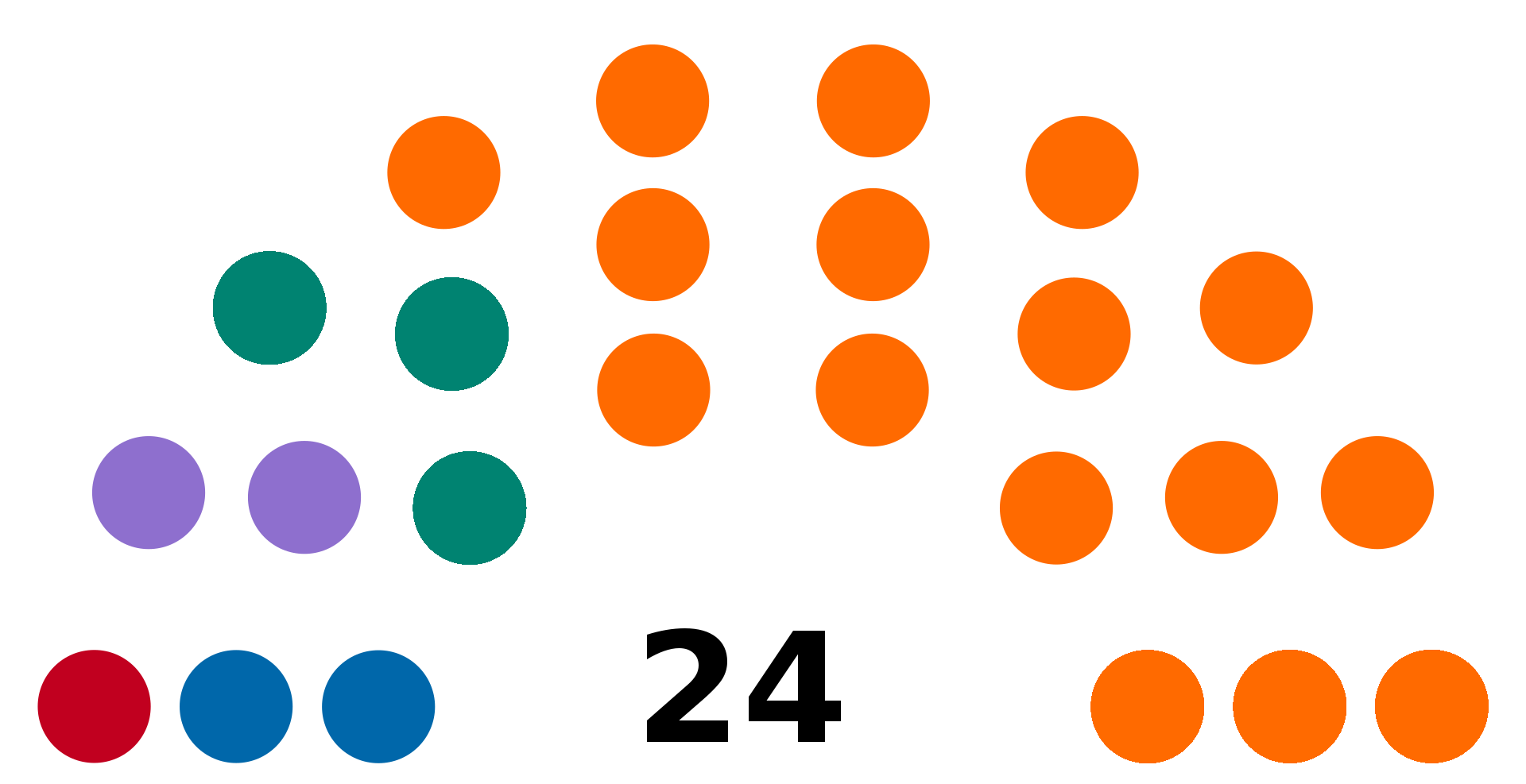
- Political groups: Administration Fidesz (16) Other parties Jobbik (3) Democratic Coalition (2) Momentum (2) MSZP (1)
- Length of term: 5 years

Elections
- Last election: 2019 Hungarian local elections

Website
- www.hbmo.hu/KepviseloTablo.aspx

The Hajdú-Bihar County Assembly is the local legislative body of Hajdú-Bihar County in Hungary. After the elections in 2019, it consists of 24 councillors, and is controlled by the Fidesz which has 16 councillors, versus 3 Jobbik, 2 Democratic Coalition, 2 Momentum Movement and 1 Hungarian Socialist Party councillors.
