= 2006 Hungarian local elections =

- October 1, 2006

Local elections took place in Hungary on 1 October 2006 amidst a period of protests and demonstrations against the government of Prime Minister Ferenc Gyurcsány. In many cities, demonstrators urged people not to vote for the MSZP candidate at the elections, and Fidesz made heavy use of the fact that Gyurcsány had admitted lying in its campaign leaflets and phone calls.

In response, Gyurcsány insisted in a speech he held in Szeged on 15 September that the local elections would have no bearing on his party staying in power, and "those who don't want a war between the government and the city should know whom to vote for".

Before the elections, the polling firm Szonda Ipsos had predicted a victory for candidates of the main opposition party Fidesz – 34% of the people asked said they would vote for Fidesz, while only 22% voiced a preference for the MSZP. The opinion poll showed Fidesz with a clear lead in towns having fewer than 10,000 inhabitants (Fidesz 38%, MSZP 19%) and a narrow lead in larger towns (Fidesz 30%, MSZP 26%), while the two parties ran equal at 27% each in Budapest.

== Results ==
Turnout in the local elections was 53.1%, which was two points higher than in 2002 and the highest for municipal elections since the return to democracy in 1990.

Interpretation of the results is complicated by the fact that a number of different offices are at stake in municipal elections. Hungarian voters elect their mayors; the county and Budapest assemblies; and the municipal corporations of their local settlement or Budapest district. (Moreover, the latter of those three elections, at least in mid- and large-sized settlements and the Budapest districts, take place under a mixed electoral system, which means votes are cast both for an individual candidate and a party list.)

The results for each were as follows:

Elections	Votes for governing parties	Votes for opposition parties	Voters for others
Mayoral elections	1,150,324; 27.06%	1,289,554; 30.33%	1,811,185; 42.61%
Elections for county and Budapest assemblies	1 286 625; 37.73%	1 794 292; 52.62%	329 219; 9.65%
Elections for municipal corporations of local settlement or Budapest district	1 637 549; 11.19%	2 592 926; 17.72%	10 401 173; 71.09%

Regarding the mayoral elections, these are the results of the cities with county rights:

- Fidesz: 15 mayoralties (+10 compared with 2002)
- MSZP: 7 (-6)
- SZDSZ: 0 (-3)
- Other: 1 (no ch.)

In Budapest, Gábor Demszky was re-elected as city mayor as SZDSZ/MSZP candidate. These are the results of the mayoral races for the individual Budapest districts:

- Fidesz: 8 mayoralties (+4 compared with 2002)
- MSZP: 11 (-4)
- SZDSZ: 2 (no ch.)
- Other: 2 (no ch.)

The polling firm Median opined that the scandal concerning Gyurcsany's admission of having lied did not affect the outcome of the elections as much as it was expected to, as support for MSZP had already hit an all-time low by early September: 33% of the voters polled had expressed their support for Gyurcsány in September, as compared to 35% in August and 38% in July.

== See also ==
- 2006 Hungarian parliamentary election
