= 2014 Hungarian local elections =

- October 12, 2014

Local elections were held in Hungary on October 12, 2014. It was the first local election according to the new Constitution of Hungary which went into force on 1 January 2012. The new electoral law entered into force that day.

== Changes compared to 2010 ==
- The two following municipal terms (2014-2019 and 2019-2024) will last for 5 years.
- The election rules for the General Assembly of Budapest has changed. Before 2014 the members of the General Assembly of Budapest were the mayor of Budapest and 32 members elected from party lists just the same way as the members of the General Assemblies of the counties are elected. From 2014 on, the 33 members of the city council are:
  - the mayor of Budapest
  - the 23 mayors of the districts of Budapest
  - 9 members from compensation-lists of parties (Budapest mayor candidates and district mayor candidates can be listed on compensation-lists)

== Levels of local governance ==
In Hungary there are two levels of local governance:

1. General Assemblies of the 19 counties and the General Assembly of Budapest
2. General Assemblies of villages, towns, cities (other than Budapest) and the General Assemblies of the 23 districts of Budapest

== The votes ==
- in Budapest:
1. for a mayor candidate of Budapest
2. for a mayor candidate of the district (who will also be the representative of the district in the General Assembly of Budapest)
3. for a candidate for being the representative of the electoral neighbourhood in the General Assembly of the district
- in towns and cities with population larger than 10,000 (other than Budapest)
1. for a party-list for the General Assembly of the county
2. for a mayor candidate of the town/city
3. for a candidate for being the representative of the electoral neighbourhood in the General Assembly of the town/city
- in towns, villages with population lower than 10,000
1. for a party-list for the General Assembly of the county
2. for a mayor candidate of the town/village
3. for as many candidates as the number of members of the General Assembly in the town/village (as these towns/villages are not further divided to electoral neighbourhoods)
- in villages that are administratively part of a town/city
1. for a party-list for the General Assembly of the county
2. for a mayor candidate of the town/city of which the village is administratively part of
3. for a candidate for being the representative of the village in the General Assembly of the town/city

== Results ==
Turnout
7:00	9:00	11:00	13:00	15:00	17:30	Overall
1.06%	6.97%	16.50%	23.53%	30.11%	39.82%	44.30%

=== Budapest ===
==== Mayor ====
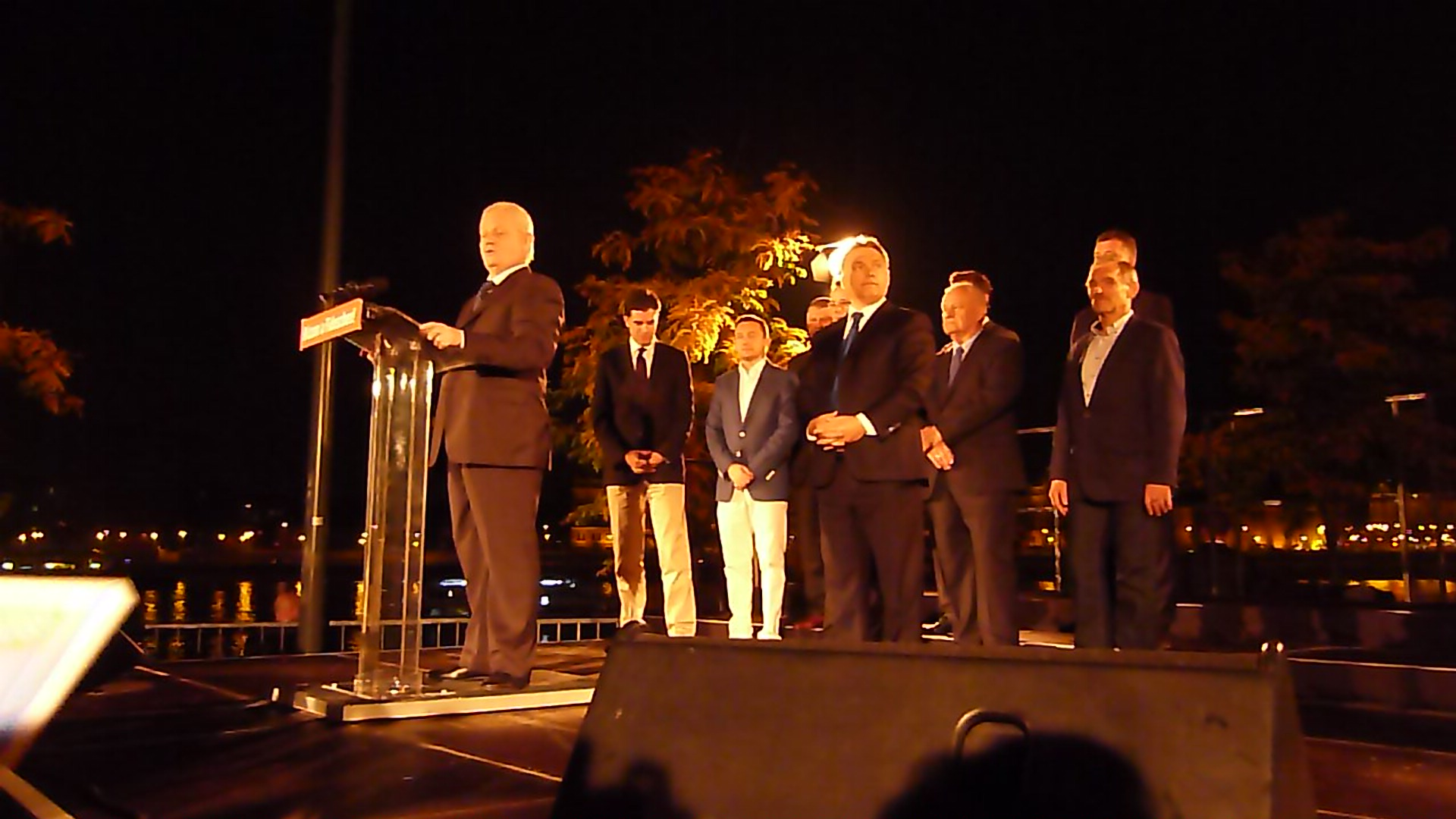
István Tarlós's speech in front of the Bálna building

Result of the mayoral election:

Candidate	Party	Votes	%	+/–
István Tarlós	Fidesz–KDNP	290,675	49.06	–4.31
Lajos Bokros	Modern Hungary Movement	213,550	36.04	New
Gábor Staudt	Jobbik	42,093	7.10	–0.17
Antal Csárdi	Politics Can Be Different	33,689	5.69	–4.20
Zoltán Bodnár	Hungarian Liberal Party	12,461	2.10	New
Total		592,468	100.00	–

==== General Assembly of Budapest ====
Party	Mayor of Budapest	Mayors of the districts	Compensation-list	Altogether
Fidesz-KDNP	1	17	2	20
MSZP		2	3	5
Együtt–PM		1	1	2
DK		1	1	2
MSZP–Együtt-PM–DK		1		1
Civilian organizations		1		1
Jobbik			1	1
LMP			1	1
Altogether	1	23	9	33

=== General Assemblies of the counties ===
Party	Votes	Proportions
Fidesz-KDNP	1,495,781	51.41%
Opposition Bloc	1,343,308	46.17%
Others	12 461	2,10%

== See also ==
- 2014 Hungarian parliamentary election
