= Fidesz–KDNP =

Hungarian electoral alliance

Fidesz–KDNP Party Alliance Fidesz–KDNP pártszövetség
- Co-Presidents: Viktor Orbán (Fidesz); Zsolt Semjén (KDNP)
- Founded: 10 December 2005; 20 years ago
- Ideology: Christian nationalism Illiberalism; Authoritarianism; National conservatism Christian democracy Right-wing populism Euroscepticism; Orbanism
- Political position: Right-wing to far-right
- European affiliation: Patriots.eu (since 2024) (Note: The alliance was formerly part of the European People's Party (2009–2024).)
- European Parliament group: Patriots for Europe (since 2024) (Note: The alliance was formerly part of the European People's Party Group (2009–2024).)
- Alliance parties: Fidesz; KDNP; Lungo Drom (Note: Non-member in a coalition with Fidesz–KDNP.)
- Colours: Orange
- National Assembly: 52 / 199
- European Parliament: 11 / 21
- County Assemblies: 227 / 381
- General Assembly of Budapest: 10 / 33

The Fidesz–KDNP Party Alliance (Hungarian: Fidesz–KDNP pártszövetség), formerly also known as the Alliance of Hungarian Solidarity (Hungarian: Magyar Szolidaritás Szövetsége), is a Christian nationalist and far-right electoral alliance, which is composed of the Fidesz – Hungarian Civic Alliance (Fidesz) and the Christian Democratic People's Party (KDNP). (Note: The Lungo Drom party also maintains a coalition with Fidesz–KDNP, but is not a member of the alliance.) The electoral alliance adheres to the beliefs and doctrines of the Catholic Church in Hungary, which has a close relationship with the alliance and received significant amounts of money from the erstwhile Fidesz–KDNP government.

The two parties jointly contested every national election since the 2006 Hungarian parliamentary election. The Fidesz–KDNP alliance governed Hungary from 2010 to 2026, altogether obtaining a supermajority in each of the 2010, 2014, 2018, and 2022 parliamentary elections, before losing in a landslide in 2026. The alliance has been seen as authoritarian, and has increasingly identified itself as illiberal.

== History ==
The two parties formed their permanent electoral coalition on 10 December 2005. After the 2006 election, Fidesz and KDNP separately formed parliamentary groups, but they established a caucus alliance in the Hungarian parliament. While Fidesz and KDNP are technically in coalition, many observers consider KDNP to actually be a satellite party of Fidesz, since it has been unable to get into the National Assembly on its own since the 1994 Hungarian parliamentary election, when it barely passed the election threshold of 5% of votes. Without Fidesz, its support cannot be measured, and even a leading Fidesz politician, János Lázár stated in 2011 that Fidesz does not consider the government to be a coalition government.

In March 2021, Fidesz left the European People's Party Group (EPP), while KDNP remained a member. In response to the admission of the Tisza Party to the EPP following the 2024 European Parliament election, the KDNP decided to leave the EPP and its parliamentary group on 18 June 2024. Fidesz formed the Patriots for Europe group in the European Parliament, becoming the third largest European Parliament group.

The Romani minority party Lungo Drom also operates alongside Fidesz–KDNP, having maintained a coalition with Fidesz–KDNP and its predecessors since 2001. Its leader, Flórián Farkas, served as a Member of the National Assembly for Fidesz–KDNP until 2022. Lungo Drom has also campaigned alongside Fidesz–KDNP in constituency seats.

== Electoral results ==
=== National Assembly ===
Election	Leader	SMCs			MMCs			Seats	+/–	Status
Election	Leader	Votes	%	Place	Votes	%	Place	Seats	+/–	Status
2006	Viktor Orbán	2,269,241	41.99	#1	2,272,979	43.21	#2	164 / 386	New	Opposition
2010	Viktor Orbán	2,732,965	53.43	#1	2,706,292	52.73	#1	262 / 386	▲99	Supermajority
Election	Leader	Constituency			Party list			Seats	+/–	Status
Election	Leader	Votes	%	Place	Votes	%	Place	Seats	+/–	Status
2014	Viktor Orbán	2,165,342	44.11	#1	2,264,780	44.87	#1	133 / 199	▼130	Supermajority
2018	Viktor Orbán	2,636,201	47.89	#1	2,824,551	49.27	#1	133 / 199	0	Supermajority
2022	Viktor Orbán	2,823,419	52.52	#1	3,060,706	54.13	#1	135 / 199	▲2	Supermajority
2026	Viktor Orbán	2,215,225	36.72	#2	2,458,337	38.61	#2	52 / 199	▼83	Opposition

=== European Parliament ===
Election	List leader	Votes	%	Place	Seats	+/−	EP Group
2009	Pál Schmitt	1,632,309	56.36	#1	14 / 22	New	EPP
2014	Ildikó Pelczné Gáll	1,193,991	51.48	#1	12 / 21	▼2	EPP
2019	László Trócsányi	1,824,220	52.56	#1	13 / 21	▲1	EPP
2024	Tamás Deutsch	2,048,211	44.82	#1	11 / 21	▼2	PfE

== See also ==
- List of political parties in Hungary

== Bibliography ==
- Jäger, Johannes; Springler, Elisabeth (10 April 2015). Asymmetric Crisis in Europe and Possible Futures: Critical Political Economy and Post-Keynesian Perspectives. Routledge. ISBN 978-1-317-65298-4 – via Google Books.
- Vida, István (2011). Magyarországi politikai pártok lexikona (1846–2010) [Encyclopedia of the Political Parties in Hungary (1846–2010)] (in Hungarian). Gondolat Kiadó. ISBN 978-963-693-276-3.
