= 2010 Hungarian local elections =

- October 3, 2010

Local elections took place on 3 October 2010 to elect mayors and the composition of municipal bodies of Hungary's 3,176 settlements. Voters also elected the total of 424 members of the county assemblies and the General Assembly of Hungary, in addition to 16,914 local government representatives.

== Results ==
Turnout
7:00	9:00	11:00	13:00	15:00	17:30	Overall
0.99%	6.60%	16.31%	23.68%	31.47%	41.77%	46.64%

=== Budapest ===
==== Mayor ====
Candidate	Party	Votes	%	+/–
István Tarlós	Fidesz-KDNP	321,908	53.37	+8.17
Csaba Horváth	Hungarian Socialist Party	177,783	29.47	–17.39 (Note: Compared to the SZDSZ-MSZP candidate in the previous election.)
Benedek Jávor	Politics Can Be Different	59,638	9.89	New
Gábor Staudt	Jobbik	43,839	7.27	New
**Total**		**603,168**	**100.00**	–

==== General Assembly ====
**Composition of the 34 seats in the General Assembly**
**Fidesz**	17 seats + Mayor of Budapest (51.5%)
**MSZP**	10 seats (30.3%)
**LMP**	3 seats (9.1%)
**Jobbik**	3 seats (9.1%)

==== Districts of Budapest ====
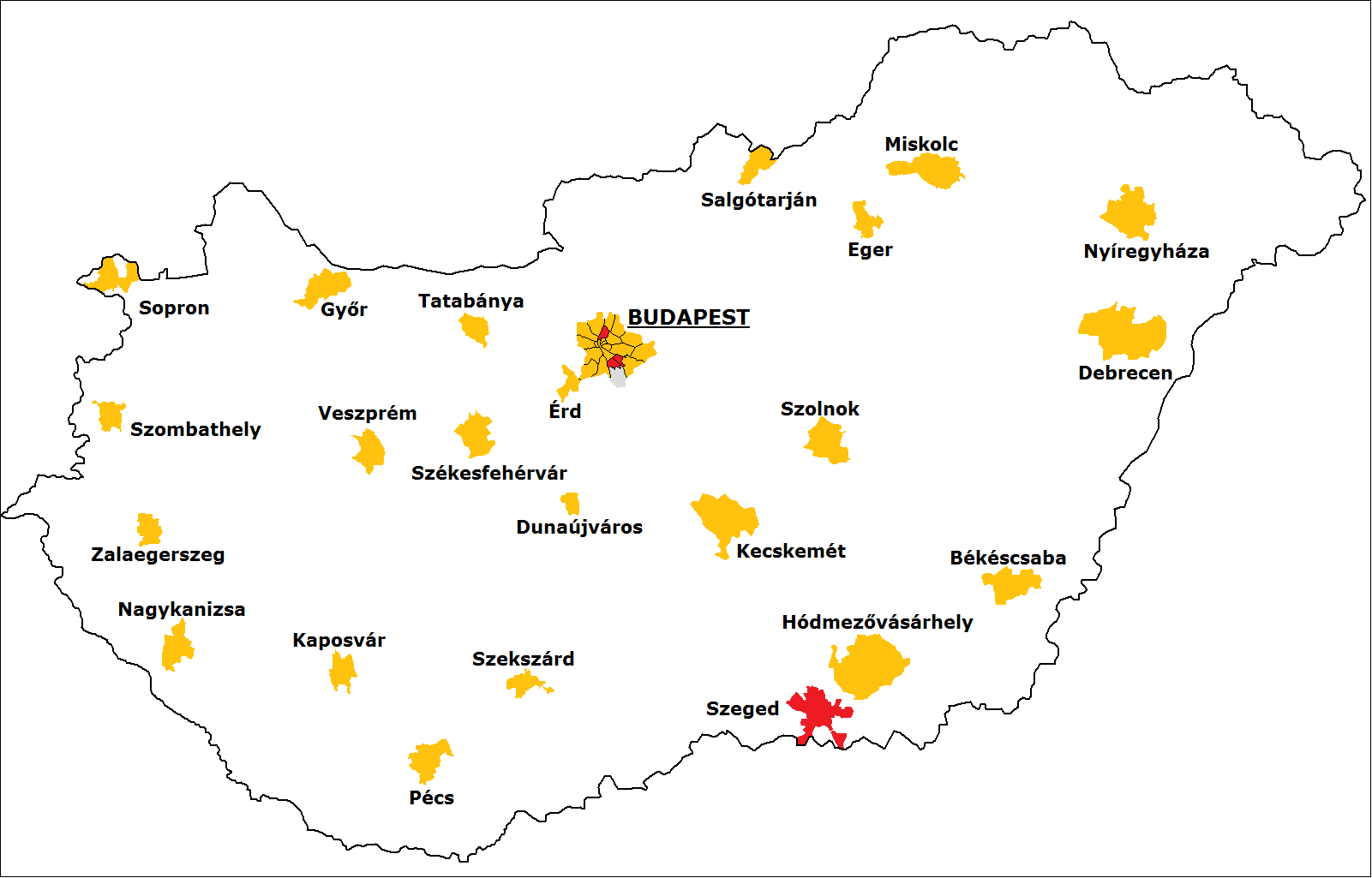
Elected mayors in the Budapest districts and in the largest Hungarian cities by parties

Cities	Incumbent mayor	Party	Elected mayor	Party
District I	Gábor Tamás Nagy	Fidesz	Gábor Tamás Nagy	Fidesz
District II	Zsolt Láng	Fidesz	Zsolt Láng	Fidesz
District III	Balázs Bús	Fidesz	Balázs Bús	Fidesz
District IV	Tamás Derce	Ind.	Zsolt Wintermantel	Fidesz
District V	Antal Rogán	Fidesz	Antal Rogán	Fidesz
District VI	István Verók	MSZP	Zsófia Hassay	Fidesz
District VII	György Hunvald	MSZP	Zsolt Vattamány	Fidesz
District VIII	Máté Kocsis	Fidesz	Máté Kocsis	Fidesz
District IX	Ferenc Gegesy	SZDSZ	János Bácskai	Fidesz
District X	Lajos Verbai	MSZP	Róbert Kovács	Fidesz
District XI	Gyula Molnár	MSZP	Tamás Hoffmann	Fidesz
District XII	Zoltán Pokorni	Fidesz	Zoltán Pokorni	Fidesz
District XIII	József Tóth	MSZP	József Tóth	MSZP
District XIV	Leonárd Weinek	SZDSZ	Ferenc Papcsák	Fidesz
District XV	László Hajdu	MSZP	Tamás László	Fidesz
District XVI	Péter Kovács	Fidesz	Péter Kovács	Fidesz
District XVII	Levente Riz	Fidesz	Levente Riz	Fidesz
District XVIII	László Mester	MSZP	Attila Ughy	Fidesz
District XIX	Péter Gajda	MSZP	Péter Gajda	MSZP
District XX	Ákos Szabados	MSZP	Ákos Szabados	MSZP
District XXI	Mihály Tóth	MSZP	Szilárd Németh	Fidesz
District XXII	Attila Szabolcs	Fidesz	Attila Szabolcs	Fidesz
District XXIII	Fereng Geiger	Ind.	Ferenc Geiger	Ind.

=== Towns with county rights ===
Cities	Incumbent mayor	Party	Elected mayor	Party
Békéscsaba	Gyula Vantara	Fidesz	Gyula Vantara	Fidesz
Debrecen	Lajos Kósa	Fidesz	Lajos Kósa	Fidesz
Dunaújváros	András Kálmán	MSZP	Gábor Cserna	Fidesz
Eger	László Habis	Fidesz	László Habis	Fidesz
Érd	András T. Mészáros	Fidesz	András T. Mészáros	Fidesz
Győr	Zsolt Borkai	Fidesz	Zsolt Borkai	Fidesz
Hódmezővásárhely	János Lázár	Fidesz	János Lázár	Fidesz
Kaposvár	Károly Szita	Fidesz	Károly Szita	Fidesz
Kecskemét	Gábor Zombor	Fidesz	Gábor Zombor	Fidesz
Miskolc	Sándor Káli	MSZP	Ákos Kriza	Fidesz
Nagykanizsa	István Marton	Ind.	Péter Cseresnyés	Fidesz
Nyíregyháza	Judit Csabai	MSZP	Ferenc Kovács	Fidesz
Pécs	Zsolt Páva	Fidesz	Zsolt Páva	Fidesz
Salgótarján	Melinda Széky-Sztrémi	Fidesz	Melinda Széky-Sztrémi	Fidesz
Sopron	Tamás Fodor	Fidesz	Tamás Fodor	Fidesz
Szeged	László Botka	MSZP	László Botka	MSZP
Székesfehérvár	Tibor Viniczai	MDF	András Cser-Palkovics	Fidesz
Szekszárd	Imre Antal Kocsis	SZDSZ	István Horváth	Fidesz
Szolnok	Ferenc Szalay	Fidesz	Ferenc Szalay	Fidesz
Szombathely	György Ipkovich	MSZP	Tivadar Puskás	Fidesz
Tatabánya	János Bencsik	Fidesz	Csaba Schmidt	Fidesz
Veszprém	János Debreczenyi	Fidesz	Gyula Porga	Fidesz
Zalaegerszeg	Endre Gyimesi	Fidesz	Csaba Gyutai	Fidesz

=== County assemblies ===
Colours explanation
Rank	1	2	3	4	5	6-
**Bold** - Majority in assembly

Gained seats in county assemblies
Number of seats		19	24	18	30	20	21	21	25	15	20	15	15	43	16	26	15	15	18	15	391
#.	List	BAR	BKK	BÉK	BAZ	CSO	FEJ	GYS	HJB	HEV	JNS	KME	NÓG	PES	SOM	SZB	TOL	VAS	VES	ZAL	Σ
1.	Fidesz–KDNP	**12**	**16**	**11**	**17**	**12**	**13**	**15**	**16**	**8**	**11**	**9**	**10**	**26**	**10**	**15**	**10**	**11**	**12**	**10**	244
2.	MSZP	3	4	4	6	6	4	4	4	4	5	4	3	10	2	5	3	2	4	3	80
3.	Jobbik	2	3	3	7	2	3	2	5	3	4	2	2	7	1	4	2	1	2	2	57
	LMP	1	1																		2
	Local (one) county lists	Somogyért													3	2	Unity for SzSzB				8
	Local (one) county lists	1	People of Baranya				1	FETE					Solidarity					1			8
Source: National Election Office

Elected members of the county assemblies by party affiliation
Party list	Representative		County	Rank					Notes
Party list	Representative		County	1.	2.	3.	4.	5.	Notes
FIDESZ–KDNP	244	62.40%	19	19	0	0	0	0	
MSZP	80	20.46%	19	0	16	3	0	0	
Jobbik	57	14.58%	19	0	2	16	1	0	
Somogyért	3	0.77%	1	0	1	0	0	0	Somogy County
LMP	2	0.51%	2	0	0	0	1	1	Baranya and Bács-Kiskun Counties
Unity for SzSzB	2	0.51%	1	0	0	0	1	0	Szabolcs-Szatmár-Bereg County
FETE	1	0.26%	1	0	0	0	1	0	Fejér County
Solidarity	1	0.26%	1	0	0	0	1	0	Vas County
People of Baranya	1	0.26%	1	0	0	0	1	0	Baranya County
Total	391			19			6	1	

== See also ==
- 2010 Hungarian parliamentary election
