= 2019 Hungarian local elections =

- October 13, 2019

Local elections were held in Hungary on 13 October 2019. Mayors and assembly members were elected for a term of 5 years.

== Electoral system ==
- Mayors of towns, cities, the districts of Budapest and Budapest itself are directly elected in a one-round, first-past-the-post election.
- Assembly members of cities (at least 10 000 inhabitants) are elected via a mixed single vote system, mostly in electoral neighbourhoods with first-past-the-post, with a smaller number of seats being distributed as "compensation" mandates between lists of losing candidates.
- Assembly members of towns (below 10 000 inhabitants) are elected with a plurality-at-large voting, where the voter can vote for as many candidates as there are seats.
- Members of county assemblies are elected with party-list proportional representation using the D'Hondt method.

== Budapest ==
=== Mayor ===
Gergely Karácsony was elected mayor, defeating incumbent István Tarlós who had been in office since 2010.

=== Assembly ===
The General Assembly of Budapest consists of the directly elected mayor, the mayors of the districts, and 9 members from party electoral lists.

The opposition bloc (Momentum–DK–MSZP–Dialogue–LMP) won a majority of 18 seats, with Fidesz–KDNP winning 13, and 2 seats going to independent politicians. This will be the first time Fidesz will not hold a majority in the assembly in over 15 years.

== County assemblies ==
Parties running in the county assembly elections are subject to a 5% threshold. An asterisk indicates a party with an absolute majority. The Fidesz–KDNP coalition won a majority in all assemblies holding elections.

=== Election results (%) ===
County Council								Number of electors	Turnout
County Council	Fidesz–KDNP	DK	MSZP	Jobbik	Momentum	MH	Other	Number of electors	Turnout
Budapest (District mayors)	44.86	51.11				0.42	3.61	1,367,945	47.97%
Baranya	57.00	12.38	8.34	9.23	8.85	4.20		189,936	53.31%
Bács-Kiskun	60.42	9.61	4.51	9.59	10.39	5.48		335,417	44.54%
Békés	53.11	10.71	7.76	14.36	8.02	6.04		237,587	47.11%
Borsod-Abaúj-Zemplén	58.79	12.39	28.83			—		403,639	53.61%
Csongrád	54.04	8.22	10.61	10.00	8.07	9.06		165,975	48.23%
Fejér	57.88	11.87	4.50	—	11.72	6.76	7.27	229,115	47.41%
Győr-Moson-Sopron	62.16	10.60	4.56	10.78	11.89	—		221,113	49.55%
Hajdú-Bihar	60.11	9.58	5.45	11.41	8.68	4.77		270,152	46.04%
Heves	60.43	39.57				—		200,445	52.25%
Jász-Nagykun-Szolnok	53.84	8.90	5.92	15.73	8.14	5.83	1.64 (Munkáspárt)	248,492	44.69%
Komárom-Esztergom	57.22	42.78				—		194,190	44.72%
Nógrád	58.22	10.35	6.70	10.19	6.85	5.47	2.21 (Munkáspárt)	129,674	53.61%
Pest	51.60	14.90	4.63	9.25	19.62	—		980,496	45.29%
Somogy	52.93	8.98	3.80	11.74	6.56	—	15.99 (Somogyért)	207,422	52.03%
Szabolcs-Szatmár-Bereg	64.93	6.82	7.74	11.57		3.44	5.50	356,764	54.81%
Tolna	58.48	11.01	6.99	10.14	8.20	5.18		157,375	49.79%
Vas	61.58	7.33	6.92	9.99	7.51	—	6.68	145,916	55.30%
Veszprém	54.01	10.12	9.34	12.18	9.22	5.13		241,711	49.24%
Zala	61.34	10.25	4.26	10.56	8.39	5.21		144,926	52.37%

==== Distribution of seats ====
County Council								Number of seats
County Council	Fidesz–KDNP	DK	MSZP	Jobbik	Momentum	MH	Other	Number of seats
Budapest (District mayors)	13	18				0	2	33
Baranya	12	2	1	2	1	0	—	18
Bács-Kiskun	16	2	0	2	2	1	—	23
Békés	10	2	1	2	1	1	—	17
Borsod-Abaúj-Zemplén	18	3	8			—	—	29
Csongrád	12	1	2	2	1	2	—	20
Fejér	14	2	0	0	2	1	1	20
Győr-Moson-Sopron	15	2	0	2	2	—	—	21
Hajdú-Bihar	16	2	1	3	2	0	—	24
Heves	9	6				—	—	15
Jász-Nagykun-Szolnok	11	1	1	3	1	1	0	18
Komárom-Esztergom	9	6				—	—	15
Nógrád	10	1	1	1	1	1	0	15
Pest	24	7	0	4	9	—	—	44
Somogy	9	1	0	2	1	—	2	15
Szabolcs-Szatmár-Bereg	18	1	2	3		0	1	25
Tolna	10	2	1	1	1	0	—	15
Vas	11	1	1	1	1	—	0	15
Veszprém	10	2	1	2	1	1	—	17
Zala	11	1	0	2	1	0	—	15
Hungary	245	36	18	40	29	8	4	381

== Major cities ==
=== Cities with county rights ===
Mayoral elections in cities with county rights, 2019
City	Mayor before		Elected Mayor	
City	name	party	name	party
Békéscsaba	Péter Szarvas	Independent	Péter Szarvas	Independent (Note: Supported by Fidesz-KDNP.) (Hajrá Békéscsaba)
Debrecen	László Papp	Fidesz-KDNP	László Papp	Fidesz-KDNP
Dunaújváros	Gábor Cserna	Fidesz-KDNP	Tamás Pintér	Jobbik (Note: Member of Jobbik, running as an independent. Supported by Opposition coalition: Jobbik–DK–Dialogue–LMP–MSZP-Momentum) (Rajta Újváros! Egyesület)
Eger	László Habis	Fidesz-KDNP	Ádám Mirkóczki	Jobbik (Note: Member of Jobbik, running as an independent. Supported by Opposition coalition: Jobbik–DK–MSZP-Dialogue–LMP–Momentum) (Egységben a Városért Egyesület)
Érd	András T. Mészáros	Fidesz-KDNP	László Csőzik	LMP-Jobbik-DK-MSZP-CÉL-Momentum-MMM-Dialogue-MLP
Győr	Zsolt Borkai	Fidesz-KDNP	Zsolt Borkai (Note: left Fidesz two days later; resigned on November 8)	Fidesz-KDNP
Hódmezővásárhely	Péter Márki-Zay (Note: Elected in a by-election in 2018)	Independent	Péter Márki-Zay	Independent (Note: Supported by Opposition coalition) (Mindenki Magyarországa-Tiszta Vásárhelyért Egyesület)
Kaposvár	Károly Szita	Fidesz-KDNP	Károly Szita	Fidesz-KDNP
Kecskemét	Klaudia Szemereyné Pataki	Fidesz-KDNP	Klaudia Szemereyné Pataki	Fidesz-KDNP
Miskolc	Ákos Kriza	Fidesz-KDNP	Pál Veres	Independent (Note: Supported by Opposition coalition: MSZP-Momentum-Dialogue-Jobbik-LMP-DK-Mindenki Magyarországa-Velünk a Város) (Függetlenek SZIVE)
Nagykanizsa	Sándor Dénes	Fidesz-KDNP	László Balogh	Fidesz-KDNP
Nyíregyháza	Ferenc Kovács	Fidesz-KDNP	Ferenc Kovács	Fidesz-KDNP
Pécs	Zsolt Páva	Fidesz-KDNP	Attila Péterffy	Independent (Note: Supported by Opposition coalition) (Mindenki Pécsért Egyesület)
Salgótarján	Zsolt Fekete (Note: Elected in a by-election in 2016)	MSZP-DK-TVE-ST	Zsolt Fekete	SSZE-DK-Jobbik-LMP-Momentum-MSZP-Párbeszéd-TVE
Sopron	Tamás Fodor	Fidesz-KDNP	Ciprián Farkas	Fidesz-KDNP
Szeged	László Botka	MSZP-DK-PM	László Botka	MSZP (Note: Member of the Hungarian Socialist Party, running as an independent. Supported by Opposition coalition: MSZP–Momentum-DK–Jobbik–LMP) (Összefogás Szegedért Egyesület)
Székesfehérvár	András Cser-Palkovics	Fidesz	András Cser-Palkovics	Fidesz
Szekszárd	Rezső Ács	Fidesz-KDNP	Rezső Ács	Fidesz-KDNP
Szolnok	Ferenc Szalay	Fidesz-KDNP	Ferenc Szalay	Fidesz-KDNP
Szombathely	Tivadar Puskás	Fidesz-KDNP	András Nemény	ÉSz-Momentum-DK-MSZP-Dialogue-LMP-MKKP-Szolidaritás-MMM
Tatabánya	Csaba Schmidt	Fidesz-KDNP	Ilona Szücsné Posztovics	DK-Jobbik-LMP-MSZP-Momentum-Dialogue
Veszprém	Gyula Porga	Fidesz-KDNP	Gyula Porga	Fidesz-KDNP
Zalaegerszeg	Zoltán Balaicz	Fidesz-KDNP	Zoltán Balaicz	Fidesz-KDNP

Italics denote a mayor not running for reelection

In the 23 cities, 13 government-aligned or government-supported candidates won, with 10 going to opposition or opposition supported mayors. This is a sharp improvement for the opposition as they previously only occupied 3 of these mayorships.

In most of the cities, the assembly majority is composed of members aligned with the mayor, except:

- Nagykanizsa, with a Fidesz-KDNP mayor, and opposition majority
- Szekszárd, with a Fidesz-KDNP mayor, and opposition majority
- Szolnok, with a Fidesz-KDNP mayor, and opposition majority
- Tatabánya, with an opposition mayor, and no clear majority

In Békéscsaba, the mayor's civil organization together with Fidesz-KDNP members have a majority.

==== Detailed results ====
City	Fidesz-KDNP		Opposition		Others (only listed if >5%)			
Békéscsaba	none		Tibor Dancsó (DK)	2 013; 9.80%	**Péter Szarvas** (Independent)	**16 211**; **78.92%**	Attila Miklós (MSZP)	1 788; 8.70%
Debrecen	**László Papp**	**35 029**; **61.77%**	Zoltán Varga (DK)	12 215; 21.54%	Csanád Ábel Kőszeghy (Jobbik)	6 841; 12.06%		
Dunaújváros	Gábor Cserna	7 397; 41.04%	**Tamás Pintér** (Jobbik)	**10 159**; **56.36%**				
Eger	László Habis	9 049; 43.77%	**Ádám Mirkóczki** (Jobbik)	**9 842**; **47.60%**	Alfréd Pócs (Independent)	1 189; 5.75%		
Érd	András T. Mészáros	10 020; 40.61%	**László Csőzik** (Independent)	**12 288**; **49.80%**	Norbert Tekauer (Independent)	2 366; 9.59%		
Győr	**Zsolt Borkai**	**19 312**; **44.33%**	Tímea Glázer (DK)	18 671; 42.86%	László Kovács (Independent)	3 677; 8.44%		
Hódmezővásárhely	none		**Péter Márki-Zay** (Independent)	**13 478**; **57.30%**	István Grezsa (Independent, nominated by Fidesz-KDNP)	10 042; 42.70%		
Kaposvár	**Károly Szita**	**12 876**; **56.43%**	Ákos Ervin Horváth (Independent)	8 841; 38.75%				
Kecskemét	**Klaudia Szemereyné Pataki**	**16 279**; **50.21%**	Zoltán Lejer (Independent)	12 015; 37.05%	Gábor Imre Hegedüs (Independent)	2 755; 8.50%		
Miskolc	Zoltán Alakszai	26 177; 40.83%	**Pál Veres** (Independent)	**35 135**; **54.80%**				
Nagykanizsa	**László Balogh**	**7 189**; **49.30%**	Tibor Hári (Independent)	6 695; 45.91%				
Nyíregyháza	**Ferenc Kovács**	**20 351**; **52.84%**	András Jeszenszki (MSZP)	18 167; 47.16%				
Pécs	Attila Vári	21 319; 41.02%	**Attila Péterffy** (Independent)	**27 622**; **53.15%**				
Salgótarján	Csaba Szabó	5 744; 42.86%	**Zsolt Fekete** (MSZP)	**7 271**; **54.25%**				
Sopron	**Ciprián Farkas**	**12 328**; **56.68%**	Norbert Varga (Independent)	8 355; 38.42%				
Szeged	none		**László Botka** (MSZP)	**40 858**; **60.56%**	Pál Nemesi (Independent, nominated by Fidesz-KDNP)	24 568; 36.41%		
Székesfehérvár	**András Cser-Palkovics**	**22 882**; **60.84%**	Roland Márton (MSZP)	12 580; 33.45%				
Szekszárd	**Rezső Ács**	**6 353**; **49.77%**	Gábor László Bomba (Independent)	6 055; 47.43%				
Szolnok	**Ferenc Szalay**	**11 616**; **47.80%**	Zoltán Radócz (MSZP)	11 364; 46.77%				
Szombathely	Péter Balázsy	16 363; 47.66%	**András Nemény** (MSZP)	**16 762**; **48.82%**				
Tatabánya	Csaba Schmidt	9 863; 46.40%	**Ilona Szücsné Posztovics** (DK)	**10 454**; **49.18%**				
Veszprém	**Gyula Porga**	**11 117**; **55.02%**	Sándor Katanics (MSZP)	9 088; 44.98%				
Zalaegerszeg	**Zoltán Balaicz**	**14 302**; **69.69%**	Csaba Keresztes (DK)	4 640; 22.61%				

Italics means incumbent, bold means winner of the election.

== Results ==
In several major cities and districts of Budapest, the opposition took part in the election with joint candidates as some surveys said there were possibilities to gain a majority in local municipalities with a joint list.

Opposition parties achieved better results as compared to the 2014 Hungarian local elections. This was the first set of local elections with a joint list of opposition parties.
