= Borsod-Abaúj-Zemplén County Assembly =

Local legislative body in Northern Hungary

Borsod-Abaúj-Zemplén County Assembly Borsod-Abaúj-Zemplén Megyei Közgyűlés

Type
- Type: County Council

History
- Founded: 1990

Leadership
- President: Boglárka Bánné Gál, Fidesz–KDNP since 13 October 2019

Structure
- Seats: 29 councillors
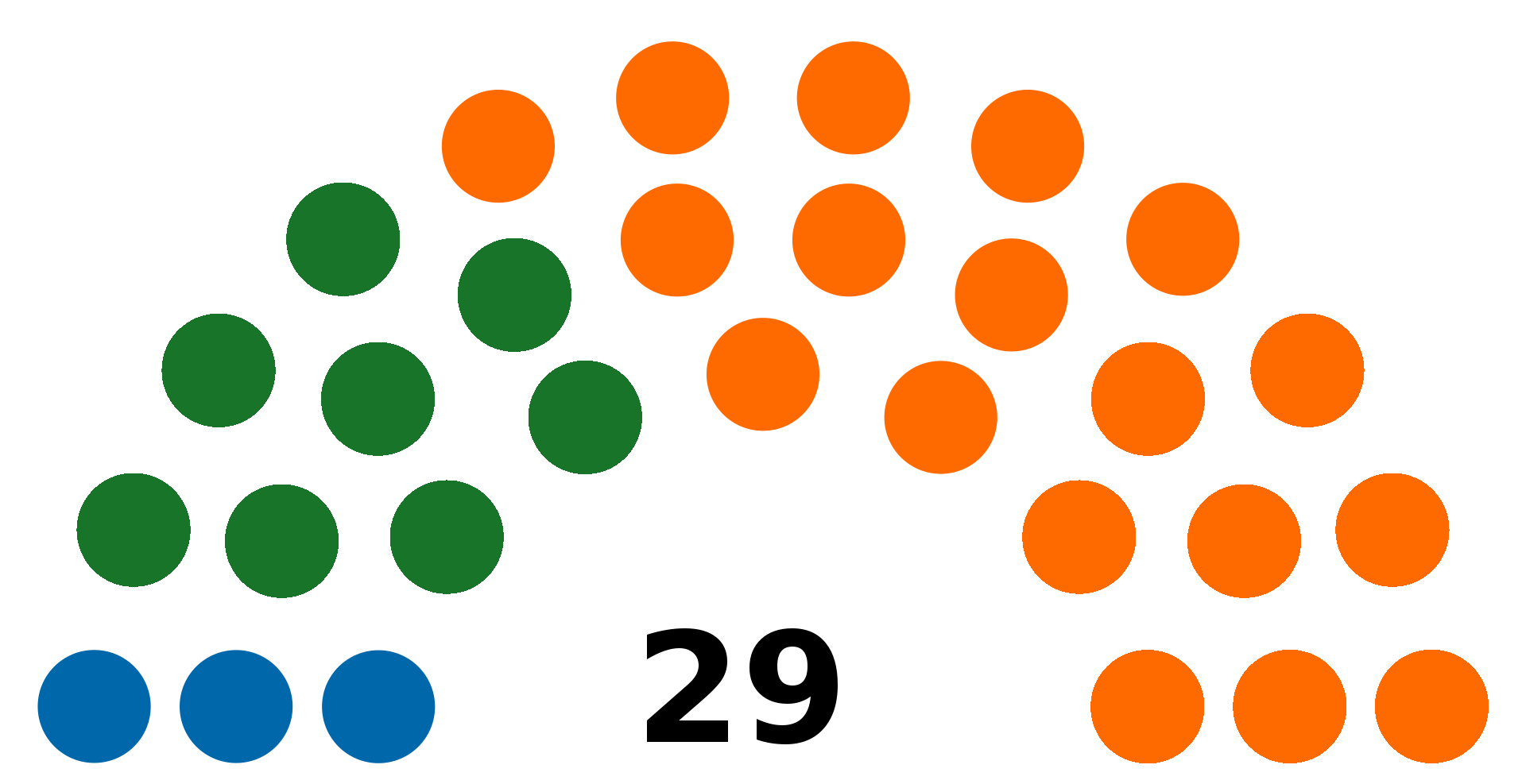
- Political groups: Administration: Fidesz–KDNP (18); Other parties (11): Jobbik-MSZP-Momentum-MMM (8); DK (3)
- Length of term: five years

Elections
- Last election: 9 June 2024
- Next election: 2029

Meeting place
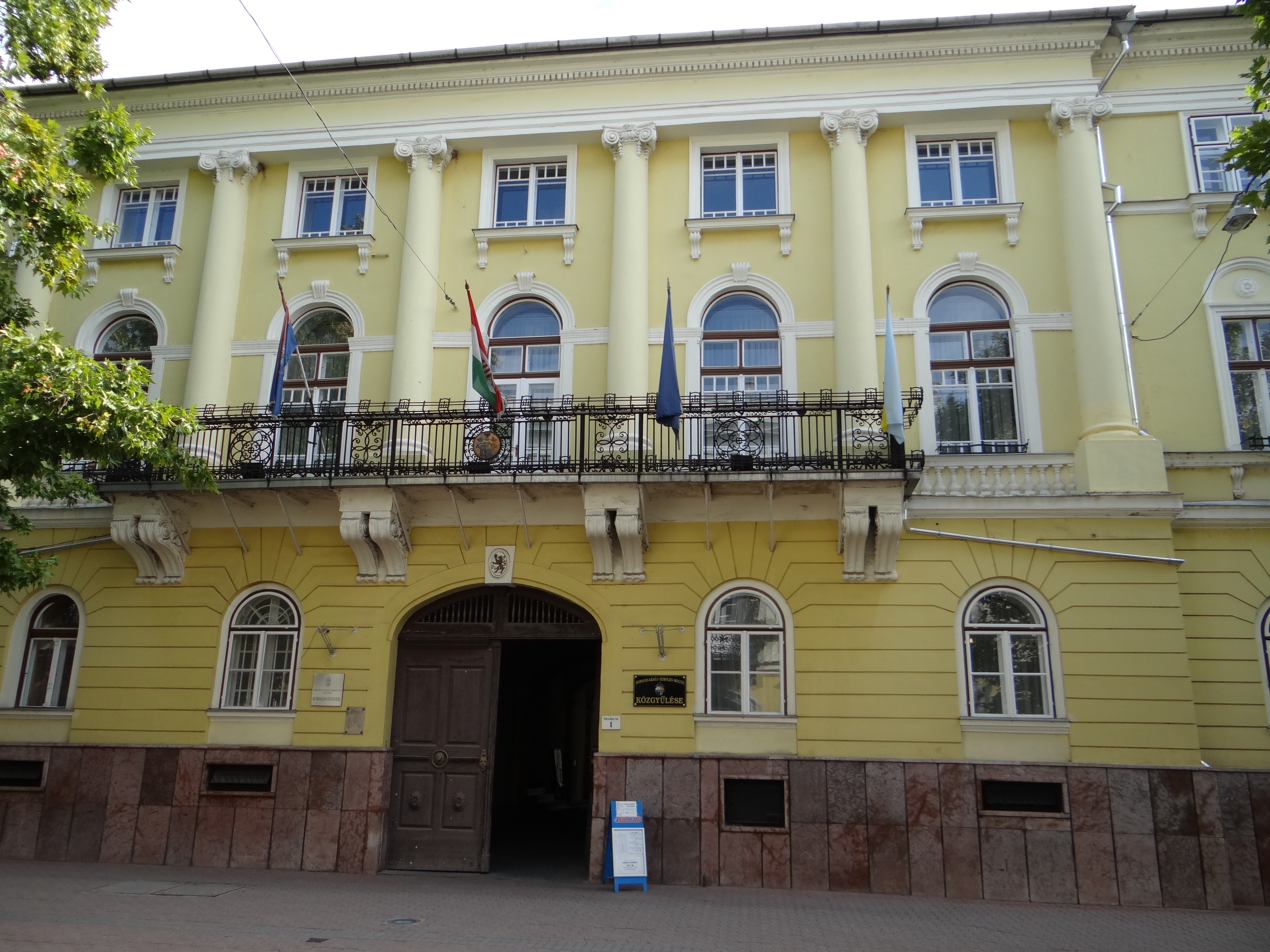
- Miskolc

Website
- baz.hu

The Borsod-Abaúj-Zemplén County Assembly (Hungarian: Borsod-Abaúj-Zemplén Megyei Közgyűlés) is the local legislative body of Borsod-Abaúj-Zemplén County in the Northern Hungary, in Hungary.

== Composition ==
=== 2019–2024 period ===
The Assembly elected at the 2019 local government elections, is made up of 29 counselors, with the following party composition:

| Party | Seats | Change | Group leader |
|---|---|---|---|
| Fidesz–KDNP | 18 / 29 | ▲3 | Boglárka Bánné Gál |
| Jobbik-MSZP-Momentum-MMM | 8 / 29 | | László Köteles |
| Democratic Coalition (DK) | 3 / 29 | ▲2 | László Majoros |

After the elections in 2019 the Assembly controlled by the Fidesz–KDNP party alliance which has 18 councillors, versus 8 Jobbik-Hungarian Socialist Party (MSZP)-Momentum Movement-Everybody's Hungary Movement (MMM) and 3 Democratic Coalition (DK) councillors.

=== 2014–2019 period ===
The Assembly elected at the 2014 local government elections, is made up of 29 counselors, with the following party composition:

| Party | Seats | Change | Group leader |
|---|---|---|---|
| Fidesz–KDNP | 15 / 29 | ▼2 | Dezső Török |
| Jobbik | 8 / 29 | ▲1 | Árpád Miklós |
| Hungarian Socialist Party (MSZP) | 5 / 29 | ▼1 | Sándor Káli |
| Democratic Coalition (DK) | 1 / 29 | New | Erika Mária Szűcs |

After the elections in 2014 the Assembly controlled by the Fidesz–KDNP party alliance which has 15 councillors, versus 8 Jobbik, 5 Hungarian Socialist Party (MSZP) and 1 Democratic Coalition (DK) and councillors.

=== 2010–2014 period ===
The Assembly elected at the 2010 local government elections, is made up of 30 counselors, with the following party composition:

| Party | Seats | Group leader |
|---|---|---|
| Fidesz–KDNP | 17 / 30 | Roland Mengyi |
| Jobbik | 7 / 30 | András Kisgergely |
| Hungarian Socialist Party (MSZP) | 6 / 30 | Dénes Kormos |

After the elections in 2010 the Assembly controlled by the Fidesz–KDNP party alliance which has 17 councillors, versus 7 Jobbik and 6 Hungarian Socialist Party (MSZP) councillors.

== Presidents of the Assembly ==
So far, the presidents of the Borsod-Abaúj-Zemplén County Assembly have been:

- 1990–1998 György Szabó, Hungarian Socialist Party (MSZP)
- 1998–2002 Ferenc Ódor, Fidesz
- 2002–2006 Ildikó Gyárfás, Hungarian Socialist Party (MSZP)
- 2006–2010 Ferenc Ódor, Fidesz–KDNP
- 2010–2014 Roland Mengyi, Fidesz–KDNP
- 2014–2019 Dezső Török, Fidesz–KDNP
- since 2014 Boglárka Bánné Gál, Fidesz–KDNP
