= Békés County Assembly =

Local legislative body of Békés county

Békés County Assembly Békés Megyei Közgyűlés

Type
- Type: County Council

History
- Founded: 1990

Leadership
- President: Mihály Zalai, Fidesz–KDNP since 12 October 2014

Structure
- Seats: 17 councillors
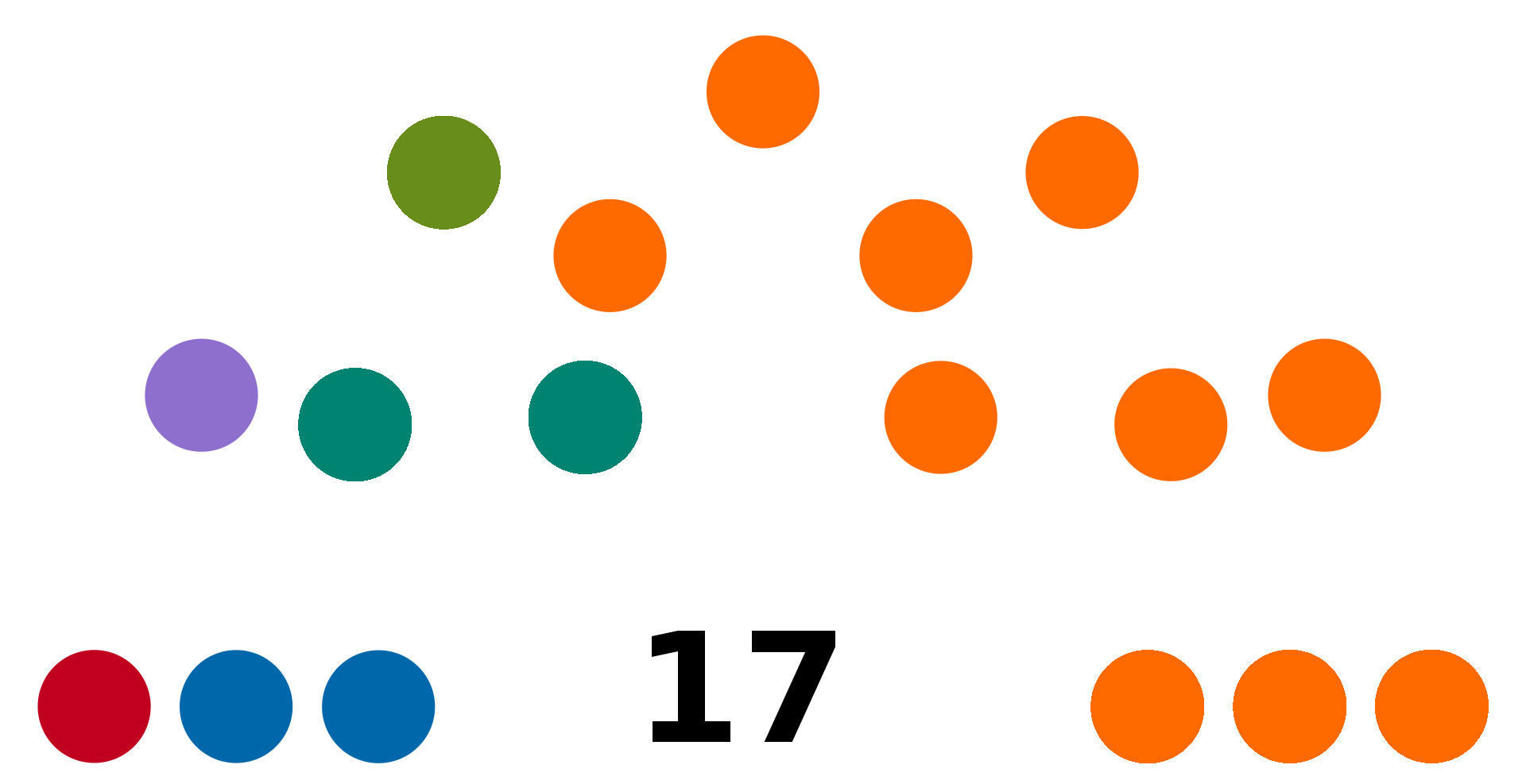
- Political groups: Administration: Fidesz–KDNP (10); Other parties (7): Jobbik (2); DK (2); Momentum (1); MSZP (1); Our Homeland (1)
- Length of term: five years

Elections
- Last election: 9 June 2024
- Next election: 2029

Meeting place
- County Hall, Békéscsaba

Website
- bekesmegye.hu

The Békés County Assembly (Hungarian: Békés Megyei Közgyűlés) is the local legislative body of Békés County in the Southern Great Plain in Hungary.

== Composition ==
Deputies in Békés County Assembly
Key to parties Hungarian Workers' Party (Munkáspárt) Hungarian Socialist Party (MSZP) Democratic Coalition (DK) Alliance of Free Democrats (SZDSZ) Momentum Movement (Momentum) Jobbik Fidesz (Fidesz–KDNP): Fidesz-MDF-MKDSZ alliance (1998); Fidesz-MKDSZ-Gazdakörök alliance (2002); Fidesz-KDNP-Gazdakörök alliance (2006); Fidesz-KDNP alliance (from 2010); Christian Democratic People's Party (KDNP): KDNP-MDF alliance (1994); Hungarian Democratic Forum (MDF) Independent Smallholders, Agrarian Workers and Civic Party (FKgP): FKgP-KDNP alliance (1998); Hungarian Justice and Life Party (MIÉP) Our Homeland Movement (Mi Hazánk) Independent / Others: Mayors' Association (Polgármesterek Egyesülete) (1994, 1998); ÖBME (2002); National Association of Large Families (NOE) Life for Years Club Association (Életet az éveknek) National Association of Municipalities of Small Villages and Small Settlements (KÖSZ)
Period	Distribution	Seats
1994–1998	3 / 14 / 6 / 2 / 4 / 9 / 1 / 1	40
1998–2002	1 / 13 / 3 / 10 / 8 / 1 / 2 / 1 / 1	40
2002–2006	20 / 3 / 14 / 2 / 1	40
2006–2010	15 / 1 / 24	40
2010–2014	4 / 11 / 3	18
2014–2019	2 / 1 / 11 / 4	18
2019–2024	1 / 2 / 1 / 2 / 10 / 1	17

=== 2019 ===
The Assembly elected at the 2019 local government elections, is made up of 17 counselors, with the following party composition:

Summary of the 13 October 2019 election results
Party	Votes	%	+/-	Seats	+/-	Seats %
Fidesz–KDNP	56,936	53.11	▼1.74	10	▼1	58.82
Jobbik	15,394	14.36	▼6.60	2	▼2	11.76
Democratic Coalition (DK)	11,486	10.71	▲4.93	2	▲1	11.76
Momentum Movement (Momentum)	8,599	8.02		1	▲1	5.88
Hungarian Socialist Party (MSZP)	8,323	7.76	▼6.59	1	▼1	5.88
Our Homeland Movement (Mi Hazánk)	6,475	6.04		1	▲1	5.88
Total	111,916	100.0		17	▼1	
Voter turnout		47.11	▲1.01			

After the elections in 2019 the Assembly controlled by the Fidesz–KDNP party alliance which has 10 councillors, versus 2 Jobbik, 2 Democratic Coalition (DK), 1 Momentum Movement, 1 Hungarian Socialist Party (MSZP), and 1 Our Homeland Movement (Mi Hazánk) councillors.

=== 2014 ===
The Assembly elected at the 2014 local government elections, is made up of 18 counselors, with the following party composition:

Summary of the 12 October 2014 election results
Party	Votes	%	+/-	Seats	+/-	Seats %
Fidesz–KDNP	60,354	54.85	▼4.35	11	0	61.11
Jobbik	23,058	20.96	▲4.28	4	▲1	22.22
Hungarian Socialist Party (MSZP)	15,794	14.35	▼9.77	2	▼2	11.11
Democratic Coalition (DK)	6,360	5.78		1	▲1	5.56
Together (Együtt)	4,461	4.05		0	±0	0
Total	115,073	100.0		18	0	
Voter turnout		46.10	▼2.27			

After the elections in 2014 the Assembly controlled by the Fidesz–KDNP party alliance which has 11 councillors, versus 4 Jobbik, 1 Hungarian Socialist Party (MSZP) and 2 Democratic Coalition (DK) councillors.

=== 2010 ===
The Assembly elected at the 2010 local government elections, is made up of 18 counselors, with the following party composition:

Summary of the 3 October 2010 election results
Party	Votes	%	+/-	Seats	+/-	Seats %
Fidesz–KDNP	70,084	59.20	▲.	11	▼13	61.11
Hungarian Socialist Party (MSZP)	28,552	24.12	▼.	4	▼11	22.22
Jobbik	19,745	16.68		3	▲3	16.67
Total	123,371	100.0		18	▼22	
Voter turnout		48.37				

After the elections in 2010 the Assembly controlled by the Fidesz–KDNP party alliance which has 11 councillors, versus 4 Hungarian Socialist Party (MSZP) and 3 Jobbik councillors.

== Presidents of the Assembly ==
So far, the presidents of the Békés County Assembly have been:

- 1990–1998 Imre Simon, Hungarian Socialist Party (MSZP)
- 1998–2002 László Domokos, Fidesz–MKDSZ-Gazdakörök
- 2002–2006 Zoltán Varga, Hungarian Socialist Party (MSZP)
- 2006–2010 László Domokos, Fidesz–KDNP
- 2010–2014 Zoltán Farkas, Fidesz–KDNP
- since 2014 Mihály Zalai, Fidesz–KDNP
