= Csaba Szabó =

Csaba Szabó may refer to:

- Csaba Szabó (politician)
- Csaba Szabo (pharmacologist)
