= Judit Csabai =

Judit Csabai may refer to:

- Judit Csabai (swimmer)
- Judit Csabai (politician)
