= Peterffy =

Peterffy, Péterffy, Péterfy, Péterfi is a Hungarian surname. Notable people with this surname include:

- Attila Péterffy (born February 26, 1969) is a Hungarian politician and mechanical engineer.
- Judit Péterfy (born in the 1960s) is a Hungarian former ice dancer.
- Miklós Péterfy, male former international table tennis player from Hungary
- Thomas Peterffy (born September 30, 1944) is a Hungarian-born American billionaire businessman.
