= Mengyi =

Mengyi is a surname. Notable people with the surname include:

- Roland Mengyi (born 1975), Hungarian parliamentarian
- Wang Mengyi (born 1992), Chinese sport shooter
