= Ádám Mirkóczki =

Hungarian politician

Mayor of Eger
- In office 13 October 2019 – 30 September 2024
- Preceded by: László Habis
- Succeeded by: Ákos Vágner

Member of the National Assembly
- In office 14 May 2010 – 25 October 2019

Personal details
- Born: 23 June 1978 (age 47) Eger, Hungary
- Party: Jobbik (2008–2020)
- Profession: journalist, sociologist, politician

Ádám Mirkóczki (born 23 June 1978) is a Hungarian politician and sociologist, who was a member of the National Assembly (MP) between 2010 and 2019. He was a member of the far-right Jobbik. He served as mayor of Eger from 2019 to 2024.

== Profession ==
Mirkóczki was born in Eger on 23 June 1978. He graduated from the local Gárdonyi Géza Cistercian Gymnasium and Dormitory in 1997. He obtained a qualification as a child and youth protection administrator there in the next year. He attended Faculty of Social Sciences of the Eötvös Loránd University (ELTE) from 2002 to 2007. Beside that, he also attended Századvég Political School between 2004 and 2006. He qualified as a journalist and editor at the training course of the Association of Independent Journalists in Budapest in 2007.

He started his career as journalist for the magazine Kárpátia. In 2008, he was the news editor of Radio Eger, and then until 2010, he was the host and editor of Szent István Radio, also stationed in Eger.

== Political career ==
Mirkóczi was a member of the local representative body in Feldebrő from 2007 to 2010. Meanwhile, he joined Jobbik in 2008. He was elected vice-president then president of the party's Heves County branch. He also became president of the party's church affairs cabinet. He was elected a Member of Parliament via the Jobbik's national list in the 2010 Hungarian parliamentary election. He served as party spokesperson from June 2010. He ran for mayoral seat of Eger in the 2010 Hungarian local elections as a candidate of Jobbik, obtaining 12.39 percent of the vote. He was re-elected MP in 2014 and 2018, via the Jobbik's national list both times. He was again a mayoral candidate in his birthplace during the 2014 Hungarian local elections, obtaining 26 percent of the vote. He was a member of the parliament's National Security Committee from 2010 to 2019. He presided the aforementioned committee from 2018 to 2019. He was also a member of the Human Rights, Minority, Civil and Religious Affairs Committee for a brief time in 2010, and the National Defense and Law Enforcement Committee from 2012 to 2018.

In 2012, Mirkóczki introduced a constitutional amendment to the Parliament seeking to ban "the promotion of sexual deviations". The amendment would punish the "promotion of homosexuality or other disorders of sexual behaviour" with up to eight years in prison. LMBT Federation, a Hungarian LGBT advocacy group, protested against the amendment and called on Parliament to reject it. The Democratic Coalition also voiced their opposition and called it "mean and shameful". The amendment ultimately failed to pass.

Mirkóczki was elected mayor of Eger during the 2019 Hungarian local elections; he ran an independent under the banner United for the City Association (EVE) and his candidacy was supported by Jobbik, MSZP, DK, Momentum and LMP. Mirkóczki defeated incumbent mayor and Fidesz candidate László Habis with 47.6 percent of the vote. Mirkóczki left Jobbik in June 2020. His mayoralty was marked by constant conflicts after he lost his majority in the assembly in October 2020. Those leaving blamed Mirkóczki's "authoritarian" leadership style. The United for the City Association (EVE) excluded Mirkóczki from their faction in May 2021, and he was accused of starting to move closer to Fidesz during his mayoralty. Mirkóczki, who ran as a candidate of the Civil Public Life Association (CKE), was defeated by Fidesz candidate Ákos Vágner in the 2024 Hungarian local elections. Mirkóczi ran as an independent candidate for MP for Eger during the 2026 Hungarian parliamentary election, but received only 0.8 percent of the vote.
