= Nándor Litter =

Hungarian politician (born 1953)

Mayor of Nagykanizsa
- In office 20 October 2002 – 20 October 2006
- Preceded by: István Tüttő
- Succeeded by: István Marton

Personal details
- Born: 18 September 1953 (age 72) Olaszfalu, Hungary
- Party: MSZP
- Profession: politician

Nándor Litter (born 18 September 1953) is a Hungarian operating engineer and politician (MSZP), who served as Mayor of Nagykanizsa from 2002 to 2006. Formerly he had interests in the oil industry and worked for the MOL Group.

Political offices
Preceded by István Tüttő	Mayor of Nagykanizsa; 2002–2006	Succeeded by István Marton
