= Zoltán Mádi =

Hungarian politician (born 1961)

Mayor of Nyíregyháza
- In office 1990 – 11 December 1994
- Preceded by: First
- Succeeded by: Judit Csabai

Personal details
- Born: 23 March 1961 (age 65) Nyíregyháza, Hungary
- Party: Fidesz
- Profession: Politician

Zoltán Mádi (born 23 March 1961) is a Hungarian politician, who served as Mayor of Nyíregyháza between 1990 and 1994. He also functioned as managing director of the Comedy Theatre of Budapest since 2004. His younger brother is László Mádi, a former Member of Parliament.

Political offices
Preceded by First	Mayor of Nyíregyháza; 1990–1994	Succeeded by Judit Csabai
