= Ottó Dóra =

Hungarian politician and mayor

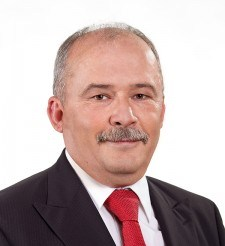

Mayor of Salgótarján
- In office 12 October 2014 – 29 November 2015
- Preceded by: Melinda Széky-Sztrémi
- Succeeded by: Zsolt Fekete

Personal details
- Born: 1 June 1962 Gödöllő, Hungary
- Died: 29 November 2015 (aged 53) Salgótarján, Hungary
- Party: MSZP
- Children: 2
- Profession: politician

Ottó Dóra (1 June 1962 – 29 November 2015) was a Hungarian politician, who served as mayor of Salgótarján from 12 October 2014 until his death.

He was a member of the Hungarian Socialist Party (MSZP). He functioned as President of the General Assembly of Nógrád County between 2002 and 2006. He died after a short illness on 29 November 2015, aged 53.

Political offices
Preceded by Melinda Széky-Sztrémi	Mayor of Salgótarján; 2014–2015	Succeeded by Zsolt Fekete
