= Judit Csabai (swimmer) =

Hungarian swimmer

Personal information
- Full name: Csabai Judit
- Nationality: Hungarian
- Born: 5 March 1973 (age 53) Nyíregyháza
- Height: 1.64 m (5 ft 5 in)
- Weight: 53 kg (117 lb)

Sport
- Sport: Swimming
- Strokes: freestyle
- Club: Nyíregyházi Vasutas SC
Medal record
European Championships (LC)
| Bronze medal – third place | 1987 Strasbourg | 800 m freestyle |
European Junior Championships (LC)
| Silver medal – second place | 1988 Amersfoort | 800 m freestyle |

Judit Csabai (born 5 March 1973 in Nyíregyháza) is a former freestyle swimmer from Hungary, who competed at the Summer Olympics for her native country in 1988.

At the European Championships she won a bronze medal in 1987 in 800 metre freestyle.
