= Zoltán Farkas (politician) =

Hungarian politician

Member of the National Assembly
- In office 14 May 2010 – 5 May 2014

Personal details
- Born: 7 November 1963 (age 62) Szeghalom, Hungary
- Party: Fidesz (since 1998)
- Profession: politician

Zoltán Farkas (born November 7, 1963) is a Hungarian politician, member of the National Assembly (MP) for Szeghalom (Békés County Constituency IV) from 2010 to 2014.

He joined Fidesz in 1998. Farkas was a member of the Defence and Internal Security Committee between May 17, 2010 and May 5, 2014.
