= Csaba Szabo (pharmacologist) =

Hungarian physician and pharmacologist

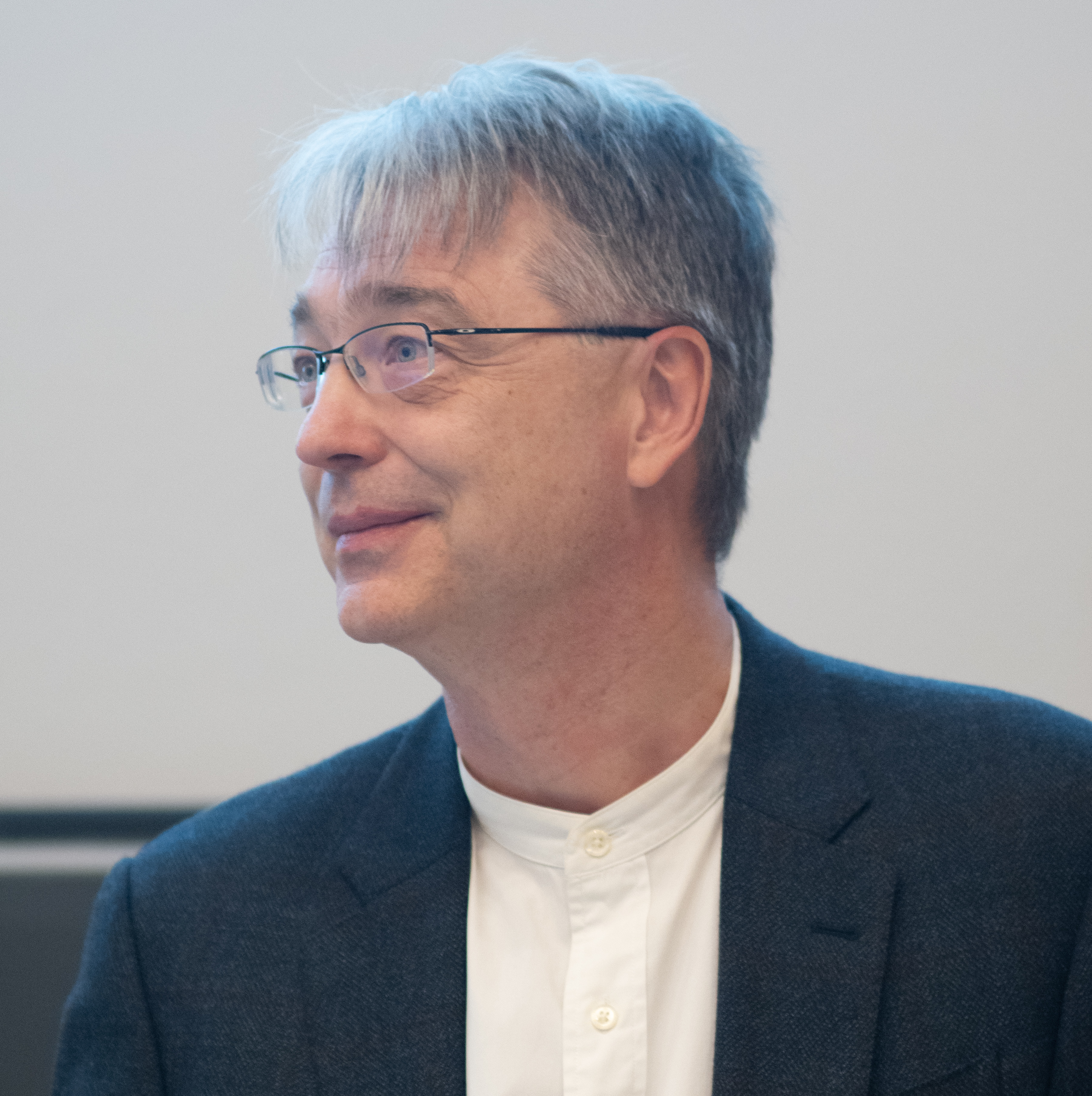
- Szabo in 2022
- Born: July 12, 1967 (age 59); Győr, Hungary
- Education: Semmelweis University Medical School (M.D) William Harvey Institute (Ph.D.) Hungarian University of Sciences (Ph.D)
- Occupations: Physician and pharmacologist

Csaba Szabo (born July 12, 1967) is a physician and pharmacologist who is the Head of the Pharmacology Section and President of the Department of Oncology, Microbiology and Immunology (OMI) of the University of Fribourg in Switzerland. The Public Library of Science Magazine, PLOS Biology, recognized Szabo in 2019 as one of the most cited researchers in the world.

== Early life ==
Szabo was born in Győr, Hungary, on July 12, 1967. He received his M.D. from the Semmelweis University Medical School in Budapest in 1992. From 1992 to 1994 he trained in pharmacology at the William Harvey Institute in London with Nobel Laureate Sir John Vane and received a Ph.D. in pharmacology. Szabo also holds a Ph.D. in physiology, and a Doctor of Sciences degree from the Hungarian University of Sciences.

== Research ==
Szabo's research investigates the biological roles of small diffusible, unstable gaseous molecules (gasotransmitters) in health and disease. His early work focused on the role of the gaseous mediator nitric oxide (a small diffusible biological mediator) in the blood vessel dysfunction and organ injury associated with circulatory shock.

Subsequent work conducted by Szabo and his collaborators in the early 2000s defined the role of an unstable reactive species called peroxynitrite – formed by the reaction of superoxide and nitric oxide – in various disease states, including circulatory shock, inflammation, and the complications of diabetes. In particular, these studies demonstrated that peroxynitrite induces breaks in the strands of the genetic material, DNA, which activate poly (ADP-ribose) polymerase (PARP), a mammalian nuclear and mitochondrial enzyme, which, in turn, induces cell necrosis, promotes inflammation and impairs vascular reactivity in various diseases.

Since 2007, Szabo's research interest expanded into the roles of hydrogen sulfide (another gaseous biological mediator) in health and disease. His work identified novel roles of hydrogen sulfide as a mitigator of heart damage during heart attacks, as a stimulator of new blood vessel formation, as a protector of blood vessels during diabetes, and as a stimulator of the cellular bioenergetics of mammalian cells.

In the context of disease pathogenesis, in 2013, while at the University of Texas, he discovered that colon cancer cells upregulate hydrogen sulfide biosynthesis in order to stimulate their growth, promote tumor blood vessel formation and to resist chemotherapy. In 2019 Szabo's group in Fribourg, Switzerland experimentally proved the "Kamoun Hypothesis", and demonstrated that excessive generation of hydrogen sulfide leads to the metabolic inhibition and synaptic dysfunction of neurons in Down syndrome.

In 1996 he co-founded the biotech company Inotek and served as its Chief Scientific Officer. The company focused on the development of various novel small molecules, including new inhibitors of PARP. One of the compounds discovered by Inotek, PJ34, is a commonly used experimental tool to inhibit PARP. Another, PARP inhibitor, INO-1001, entered clinical trials in 2006. From 2007 to 2010 Szabo served as the Chief Scientific Officer of Ikaria Inc., a company focused on therapeutic applications of hydrogen sulfide and nitric oxide.

In 2021, Szabo's team demonstrated that low concentrations of the gaseous molecule cyanide – previously known only for its toxic effects – can also have stimulatory bioenergetic effects in mammalian cells. Subsequent work of his research group demonstrated that mammalian cells have the ability to produce low levels of cyanide.

== Awards and honors ==
According 2022 Elsevier Worldwide Citation Metrics Index, Dr. Szabo's citations place him into the top 1% of the top 2% of all scientists worldwide, at the overall spot of 383 out of those 100,000 scientists who made this list.

- Novartis Prize of the British Pharmacological Society, 2003.
- Dennis Gabor Innovation Award, 2004.
- Officer's Cross - Order of Merit Award of the Hungarian Republic, 2006.
- Texas Star Award - University of Texas System.
- Elected Fellow of the British Pharmacological Society, 2012.
- Recognized as one of the most cited researchers, listed among the top 1,000 worldwide, PLOS Biology,
- John Vane Medal or the British Pharmacological Society, 2021.
- Highly Cited Researcher in Pharmacology, 2022 & 2024.

== Publications ==
Szabo authored or co-authored over 500 publications, which were cited over 90,000 times, yielding a H-index of 152.

== Books ==
- Cell Death: the role of PARP, 2000 (Taylor Francis).
- Adenosine Receptors, 2006 (Taylor Francis).
- Unreliable. Bias, Fraud, and the Reproducibility Crisis in Biomedical Research, 2025 (Columbia University Press)
