= Csaba Gyutai =

Hungarian politician

Mayor of Zalaegerszeg
- In office 3 October 2010 – 12 October 2014
- Preceded by: Endre Gyimesi
- Succeeded by: Zoltán Balaicz

Member of the National Assembly
- In office 14 May 2010 – 5 May 2014

Personal details
- Born: 14 October 1966 (age 59) Zalaegerszeg, Hungary
- Party: Fidesz (since 1989)
- Children: 4
- Profession: politician

Csaba Gyutai (born 14 October 1966) is a Hungarian politician, who served as Mayor of Zalaegerszeg from October 2010 to October 2014.

He was a member of the National Assembly (MP) from Zala County Regional List between 2010 and 2014. He worked for the Parliamentary Committee on Culture and the Media. For the 2014 municipal elections his party, the Fidesz local branch nominated Zoltán Balaicz as mayoral candidate in Zalaegerszeg instead of Gyutai.

== Personal life ==
He is married and has four children.

Political offices
Preceded by Endre Gyimesi	Mayor of Zalaegerszeg; 2010–2014	Succeeded by Zoltán Balaicz
