= Péter Cseresnyés =

Hungarian politician (born 1960)

Mayor of Nagykanizsa
- In office 3 October 2010 – 12 October 2014
- Preceded by: István Marton
- Succeeded by: Sándor Dénes

Member of the National Assembly
- Incumbent
- Assumed office 15 May 2002

Personal details
- Born: 9 January 1960 (age 66) Zalaegerszeg, Hungary
- Party: Fidesz
- Spouse: Lívia Cseresnyésné Nagy
- Children: Péter
- Profession: Politician

Péter Cseresnyés (born 9 January 1960) is a Hungarian politician, member of the National Assembly (MP) from Zala County Regional List from 2002 to 2010. He represents Nagykanizsa (Zala County Constituency II then III) since 14 May 2010.

He joined Fidesz in 1998 and has presided over the Nagykanizsa branch since then. He was appointed to be a constituency leader during the party organization reform in 2003-2004. In the parliamentary elections in April 2002 he was elected from the joint Zala County list of Fidesz and the Hungarian Democratic Forum (MDF). Since the inauguration of the new Parliament he was active in the Youth and Sport Committee. In the local elections on 20 October 2002 he secured a seat in the Assembly of Nagykanizsa City with County Status, where he was on the Finance and City Management Committee. He secured a seat in Parliament in the 2006 general elections from the Zala county regional list.

He served as deputy mayor of Nagykanizsa from 2006 to 2010. His relation with the independent mayor István Marton decayed and the Fidesz withdrew confidence from the mayor. However Marton and two other municipal representatives left the Fidesz party and founded Civic Association for Nagykanizsa (KKE). The Fidesz group lost its majority in the General Assembly. Cseresnyés became Mayor of Nagykanizsa as candidate of Fidesz in 2010. István Marton (KKE) came to second place with 19.91%.

In the Hungarian parliament, he was a member of the Committee on Education, Science and Research (2010–14), then Economic Committee (2014–15). Cseresnyés was appointed Secretary of State for Employment in the Ministry of National Economy on 9 October 2015, replacing Sándor Czomba. He served in this capacity until May 2018, when he was appointed Deputy Minister of Innovation and Technology.

== Personal life ==
He is married. His wife is Lívia Cseresnyéséné Nagy. They have a son, Péter.

Political offices
Preceded by István Marton	Mayor of Nagykanizsa; 2010–2014	Succeeded by Sándor Dénes
