= László Domokos =

Hungarian politician (born 1965)

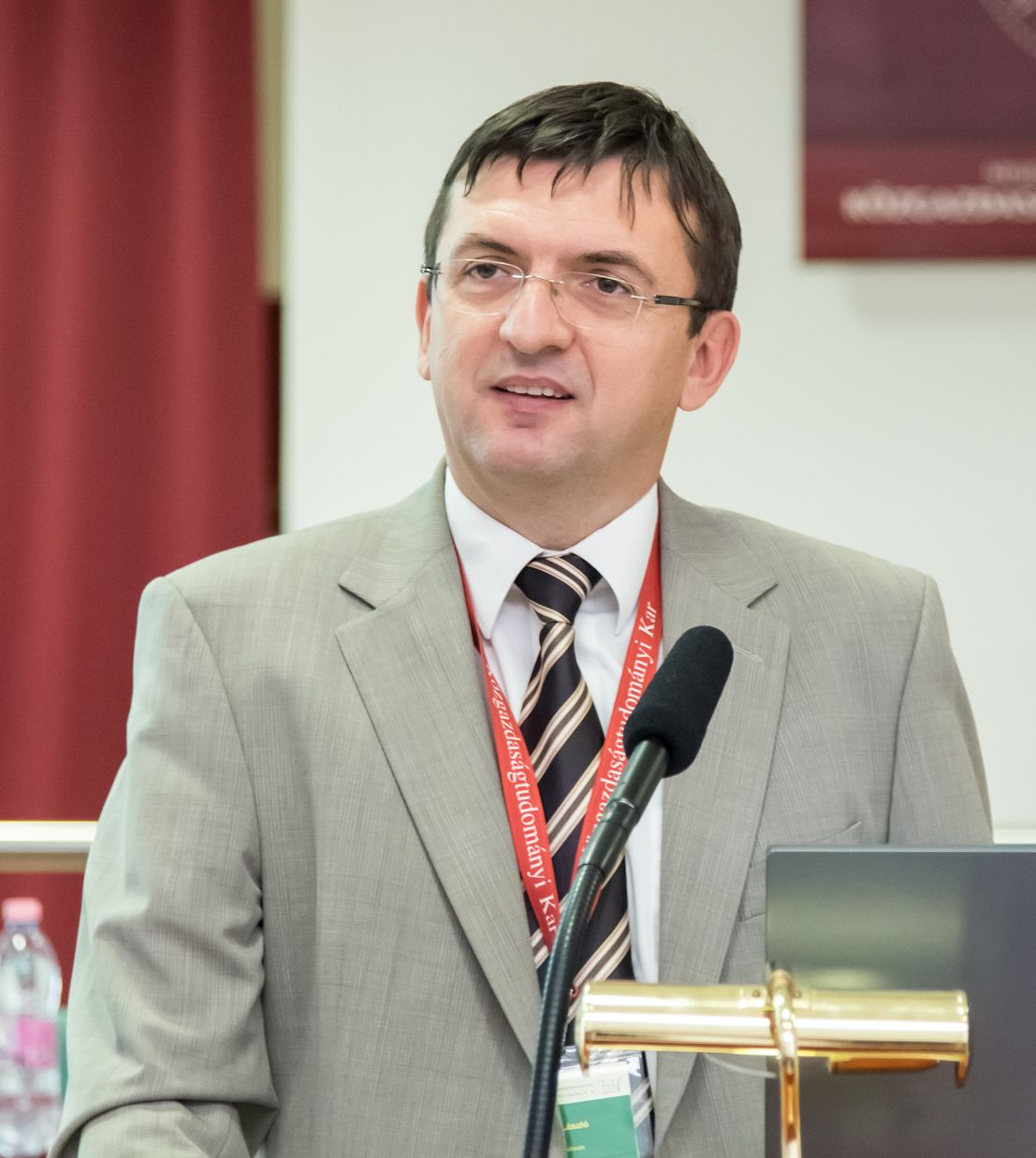
- László Domokos in 2012

Member of the National Assembly
- In office 18 June 1998 – 4 July 2010

Personal details
- Born: 26 February 1965 (age 61) Békéscsaba, Hungary
- Party: Fidesz (1991-2010)
- Spouse: Dr Judit Pető
- Children: Anna
- Profession: economist

László Domokos (born 26 February 1965) is a Hungarian politician, member of the National Assembly (MP) for Szarvas (Békés County Constituency V) from 1998 to 2010.

He became President of the State Audit Office, as a result he resigned from his parliamentary seat on 4 July 2010. He was replaced by Béla Dankó after a by-election.

== Personal life ==
He is married. He has a daughter.
