= Csaba Schmidt =

Hungarian politician (1979–2023)

Mayor of Tatabánya
- In office 3 October 2010 – 13 October 2019
- Preceded by: János Bencsik
- Succeeded by: Ilona Szücsné Posztovics

Member of the National Assembly
- In office 14 May 2010 – 5 May 2014

Personal details
- Born: 3 May 1979 Tatabánya, Hungary
- Died: 19 March 2023 (aged 43) Tatabánya, Hungary
- Party: Fidesz
- Children: Zalán; Ákos; Natália
- Profession: chemist politician

Csaba Schmidt (3 May 1979 – 19 March 2023) was a Hungarian chemist and politician, member of the National Assembly (MP) from Fidesz Komárom-Esztergom County Regional List between 2010 and 2014. He was elected mayor of Tatabánya on 3 October 2010.

He was a member of the Committee on Sustainable Development from 14 May 2010 to 5 May 2014 and Committee on Local Government and Regional Development from 23 September 2013 to 5 May 2014.

Political offices
Preceded by János Bencsik	Mayor of Tatabánya; 2010–2019	Succeeded by Ilona Szücsné Posztovics
