= István Marton (politician) =

Hungarian politician (1943–2015)

Mayor of Nagykanizsa
- In office 20 October 2006 – 3 October 2010
- Preceded by: Nándor Litter
- Succeeded by: Péter Cseresnyés

Personal details
- Born: 21 June 1943 Celldömölk, Hungary
- Died: 19 April 2015 (aged 71)
- Party: Civic Association for Nagykanizsa (KKE)
- Profession: politician

István Marton (21 June 1943 – 19 April 2015) was a Hungarian politician, who served as Mayor of Nagykanizsa from 2006 to 2010.

Marton became an independent mayor with the support of Fidesz. His relation with the deputy mayor Péter Cseresnyés decayed and the Fidesz withdrew confidence from the mayor. However Marton and two other municipal representatives left the Fidesz party and founded Civic Association for Nagykanizsa (KKE). The Fidesz group lost its majority in the General Assembly. Cseresnyés became Mayor of Nagykanizsa as candidate of Fidesz in 2010. István Marton (KKE) came to second place with 19,91%.

Political offices
Preceded by Nándor Litter	Mayor of Nagykanizsa; 2006–2010	Succeeded by Péter Cseresnyés
