= Gábor Cserna =

Hungarian politician

Mayor of Dunaújváros
- In office 3 October 2010 – 13 October 2019
- Preceded by: András Kálmán
- Succeeded by: Tamás Pintér

Member of the National Assembly
- In office 7 March 2011 – 5 May 2014
- In office 15 May 2002 – 15 May 2006

Personal details
- Born: 27 October 1969 (age 56) Budapest, Hungary
- Party: Fidesz
- Spouse: Beatrix Szabó
- Profession: politician

Gábor Cserna (born 27 October 1969) is a Hungarian politician, member of the National Assembly (MP) from Fejér County Regional List between 2011 and 2014. He was already Member of the Parliament from 2002 to 2006. He served as the mayor of Dunaújváros from October 2010 to October 2019.

== Political career ==
He joined Fidesz in 1988. He was elected local government representative of an individual constituency of Dunaújváros in October 1990 and held the office until December 1994. He was on the Education Committee. He has presided over the Dunaújváros branch of Fidesz from 1994, and has also been on the party's Fejér County presidium. He was again elected as an individual representative to the Assembly of Dunaújváros City with County Status for the term 1998-2002. He chaired the Education Committee from October 1998. In the parliamentary elections in April 2002 he won a mandate from the joint Fejér County list of Fidesz and the Hungarian Democratic Forum (MDF). He started his legislative work in the Cultural and Press Committee and the Committee on Civil Organisations. In December of the same year he resigned from his membership in the Committee making decisions on support to civil organisations.

Cserna was elected Mayor of Dunaújváros in the local elections in October 2010. He replaced András Kálmán (MSZP) in that position. He became a member of the National Assembly in March 2011, when MP István Mikola resigned, who was appointed Hungarian Ambassador to the Organisation for Economic Co-operation and Development (OECD). Cserna was re-elected mayor during the 2014 local elections. He was defeated by Jobbik politician Tamás Pintér in the 2019 local elections.

== Sexuality ==
According to some rumors Gábor Cserna's sexual orientation is homosexual. These rumors have circulated that 10 years ago Cserna's wife caught him cheated on her with another man. After that his wife abused him to required hospitalization. However Cserna said to ATV.hu that is a well-structured urban legend with the aim of discrediting him. According to the webpage Cserna has a strong opposition within the party and the Fidesz majority eroded in the General Assembly.

== Personal life ==
He is married. His wife is Beatrix Szabó.

Political offices
Preceded by András Kálmán	Mayor of Dunaújváros; 2010–2019	Succeeded by Tamás Pintér
