= Judit Csabai (politician) =

Hungarian politician (born 1947)

Mayor of Nyíregyháza
- In office 11 December 1994 – 3 October 2010
- Preceded by: Zoltán Mádi
- Succeeded by: Ferenc Kovács

Member of the National Assembly
- In office 18 June 1998 – 15 May 2006
- In office 28 June 1994 – 11 September 1995

Personal details
- Born: 24 March 1947 (age 79) Budapest, Hungary
- Party: MSZP (since 1989)
- Other political affiliations: MSZMP (1974–1989)
- Children: Judit Csabai
- Profession: Politician

Judit Csabai (née Rácz; born 24 March 1947) is a Hungarian politician, a former member of the National Assembly between 1994–95 and 1998–2006. She represented Nyíregyháza (Szabolcs-Szatmár-Bereg County Constituency II) from 2002-06. Csabai served as Mayor of Nyíregyháza between 1994 and 2010. She was succeeded by Ferenc Kovács.

Her daughter, Judit, is a former freestyle swimmer, who competed at the Summer Olympics for her native country in 1988.

Political offices
| Preceded by Zoltán Mádi | Mayor of Nyíregyháza; 1994–2010 | Succeeded by Ferenc Kovács |
