= Ákos Kriza =

Hungarian politician (1965–2021)

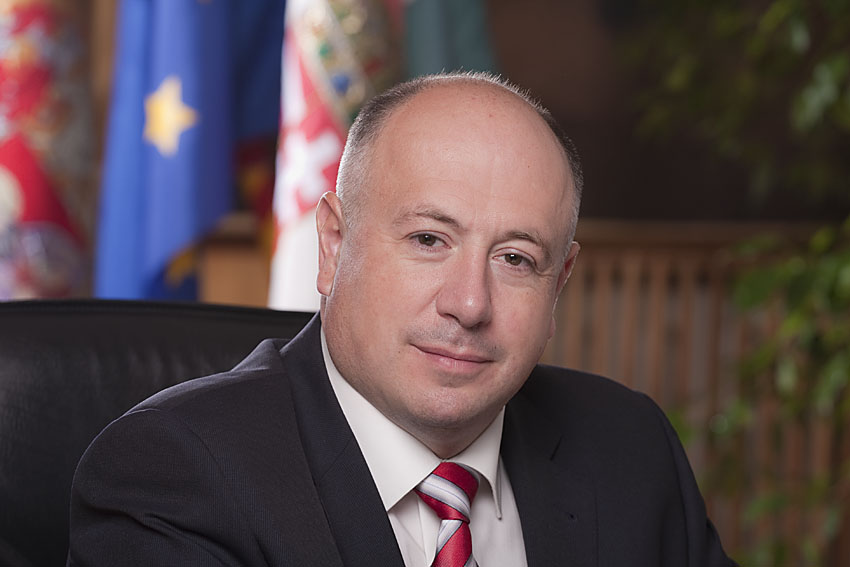

Mayor of Miskolc
- In office 3 October 2010 – 13 October 2019
- Preceded by: Sándor Káli
- Succeeded by: Pál Veres

Personal details
- Born: 10 February 1965 Oradea, Romania
- Died: 18 January 2021 (aged 55) Miskolc, Hungary
- Party: Fidesz
- Spouse: Zsuzsanna László
- Children: Anna; Áron
- Occupation: Politician
- Website: http://www.krizaakos.hu/

Ákos Kriza (10 February 1965 − 18 January 2021) was a Hungarian politician. Kriza was a member of Fidesz and served as mayor of Miskolc from 3 October 2010 to 13 October 2019.

== Biography ==
Kriza was born in Oradea, Romania. He studied medicine at the University of Medicine and Pharmacy in Târgu Mureș and economics at the University of West Hungary. He received his medical degree in 1990 and moved to Miskolc the same year. He worked in the Diósgyőr Hospital then as a general practitioner until 1999 when he became a hospital manager. He joined Fidesz in 1997 and ran for mayor in 2006 when he was defeated by the incumbent mayor, Sándor Káli. After his party's landslide victory in the parliamentary elections in April 2010, he was elected mayor during the local elections held in the autumn, defeating Sándor Káli. Kriza was re-elected mayor during 2014 local elections, obtaining 42.27 percent of the vote and defeating opposition candidates Albert Pásztor, a former top police official, and Péter Jakab.

On 9 August 2019, Kriza announced he was not seeking re-election due to his long-standing tumor disease. The government party Fidesz nominated Zoltán Alakszai, the notary of Miskolc as their nominee for the position of mayor. Alakszai was defeated by local school headmaster and joint opposition candidate Pál Veres in the 2019 local elections.

== Personal life ==
He was married to Zsuzsanna László. They have a daughter, Anna, and a son, Áron.

Ákos Kriza died on 18 January 2021, at the age of 55, after a long-term illness.

Political offices
Preceded by Sándor Káli	Mayor of Miskolc; 2010–2019	Succeeded by Pál Veres
