= Ferenc Ódor =

Hungarian veterinary physician and politician

Member of the National Assembly
- In office 18 June 1998 – 5 May 2014

Personal details
- Born: 22 November 1954 (age 71) Kecskemét, Hungary
- Party: Fidesz (since 1993)
- Spouse: Dr Katalin Zelenák
- Children: Katalin; Cseperke
- Profession: veterinarian, politician

Dr. Ferenc Ódor (born 22 November 1954) is a Hungarian veterinary physician and politician, member of the National Assembly (MP) for Encs (Borsod-Abaúj-Zemplén County Constituency IX) from 1998 to 2014. He served as mayor of Garadna between 1990 and 1998. He also functioned as president of the General Assembly of Borsod-Abaúj-Zemplén County twice: from 1998 to 2002 and between 2006 and 2010.

In the general election held in 2006, he was elected MP for Encs for the third time. He was a member of the Local Government and Urban Development Committee between 30 May 2006 and 13 May 2010. He was re-elected individual MP during the 2010 parliamentary election. He functioned as member of the Committee on Agriculture and Committee on Health Affairs until 31 December 2012.

Ódor was appointed head of the District Office of Encs on 17 December 2012. Following the adoption of new law on conflicts of interest, he did not run for a parliamentary seat in the 2014 parliamentary election, retaining his office of district head. Ódor was arrested on charges of accepting official bribes on 19 December 2018. He was suspended from his post with immediate effect.

== Personal life ==
He is married. His wife is Dr Katalin Zelenák. They have two daughters, Katalin and Cseperke.
