= Melinda Széky-Sztrémi =

Hungarian educator and politician

Mayor of Salgótarján
- In office 1 October 2006 – 12 October 2014
- Preceded by: Béla Puszta
- Succeeded by: Ottó Dóra

Member of the National Assembly
- In office 14 May 2010 – 5 May 2014

Personal details
- Born: 16 March 1958 (age 68) Balassagyarmat, Hungary
- Party: Fidesz (since 2007)
- Spouse: Miklós Széky
- Children: Virág; Flóra
- Profession: Teacher, politician

Melinda Széky-Sztrémi (née Sztrémi; born 16 March 1958) is a Hungarian educator and politician, mayor of Salgótarján from 2006 to 2014 and also a member of the National Assembly (MP) for Salgótarján (Nógrád County Constituency I) between 2010 and 2014.

Political offices
Preceded by Béla Puszta	Mayor of Salgótarján; 2006–2014	Succeeded by Ottó Dóra
