= Attila Péterffy =

Hungarian politician

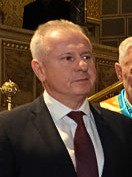
- Péterffy in 2024

Mayor of Pécs
- Incumbent
- Assumed office 13 October 2019
- Preceded by: Zsolt Páva

Personal details
- Born: February 26, 1969 (age 57) Pécs, People's Republic of Hungary
- Party: Independent
- Children: 3
- Education: University of Miskolc

Attila Péterffy (born February 26, 1969) is a Hungarian politician and mechanical engineer. In the 2019 Hungarian local elections, he was elected as the Mayor of Pécs.
