= Endre Gyimesi =

Hungarian historian and politician (born 1952)

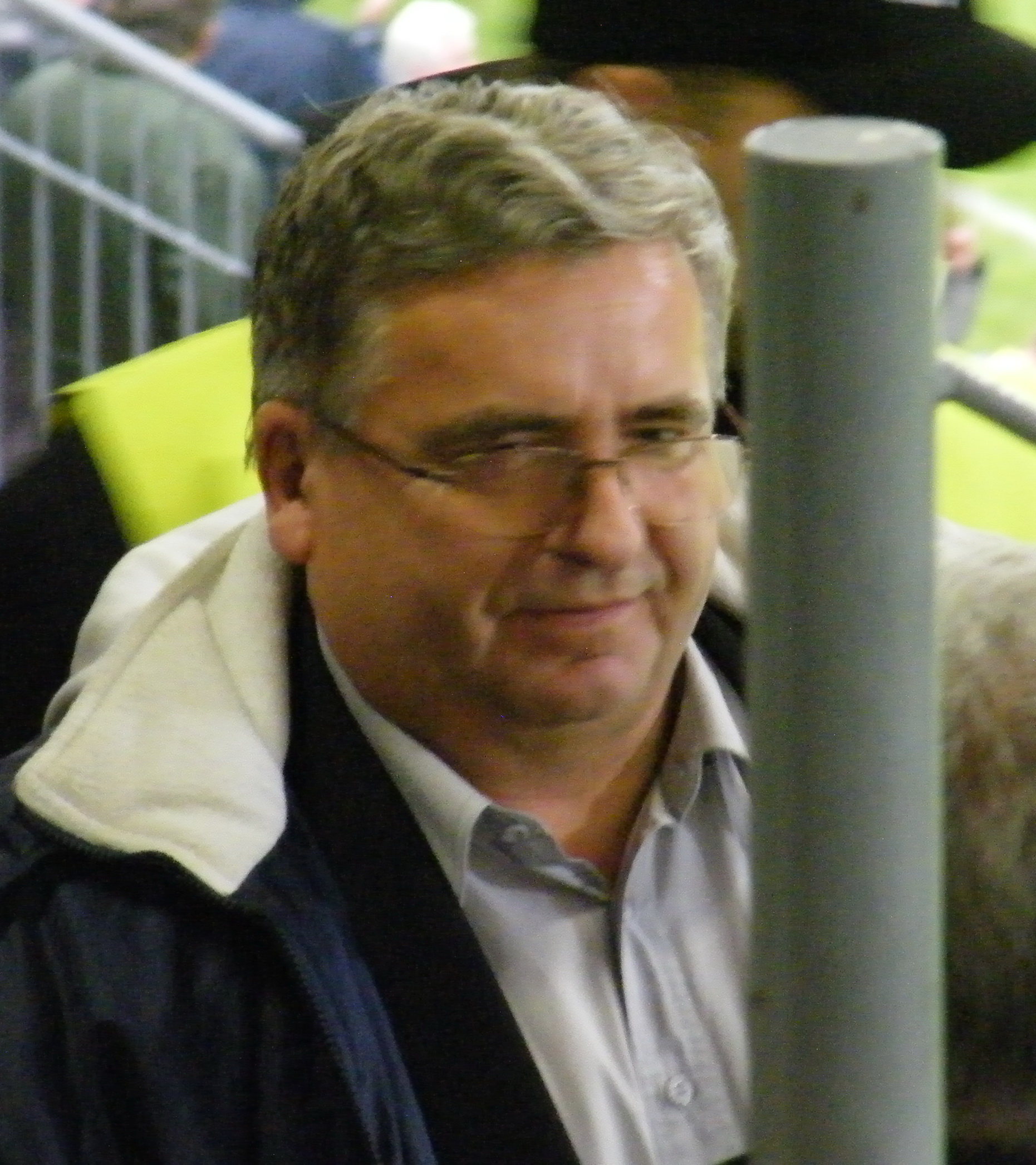

Mayor of Zalaegerszeg
- In office 11 December 1994 – 3 October 2010
- Preceded by: Imre Bogár
- Succeeded by: Csaba Gyutai

Member of the National Assembly
- In office 15 May 2002 – 5 May 2014

Personal details
- Born: 20 October 1952 (age 74) Keszthely, Hungary
- Party: Fidesz (since 1999)
- Spouse: Erika
- Children: Kinga; Márton; Kata
- Profession: historian, politician

Dr. Endre Gyimesi (born 20 October 1952) is a Hungarian historian and politician, member of the National Assembly (MP) for Zalaegerszeg (Zala County Constituency I) between 2002 and 2014. Gyimesi served as Mayor of Zalaegerszeg from 1994 to 2010.

== Biography ==
Gyimesi was born in Keszthely on 20 October 1952. He graduated in history and library studies from the Faculty of Humanities of the Eötvös Loránd University in Budapest in 1977, and in 1980 he received his doctoral diploma in humanities. Since 1977 he has been an assistant to the county library in Zalaegerszeg researching local history. From 1981 he was director of József Attila Library, from 1986 deputy director, and from 1988 until 1994 director of the county archives. Since 1972 he has been the author of several studies on local history and cultural history as well as individual publications, and editor of the journal Zalai Gyűjtemény (Zala Collection).

He was president of the Alliance of Zala County Civil Organisations from 1990 to 1995, and a member of its National Board. He was chairman of the basketball section of the sports club ZTE Goldsun from 1992 to 1994. He has been the chairman of Degré Alajos Foundation for Ethnography since 1992 and chairman of Millecentennial Foundation since 1996. Since 1997 he has been on the Hungarian Olympic Committee. He received ministerial recognition several times and the Pro Turismo Award was conferred upon him by the Minister of Economy in 2001.

=== Political career ===
He was invited to, and became a member of, the County General Assembly in 1991. With support from the Hungarian Democratic Forum (MDF), the Christian Democratic People's Party (KDNP), Fidesz and the Independent Smallholders' Party (FKGP), he was elected Mayor of Zalaegerszeg on 11 December 1994 and re-elected in October 1998 with the support of Fidesz, the Hungarian Democratic Forum (MDF), the Hungarian Christian Democratic Alliance (MKDSZ) and the Christian Democratic People's Party (KDNP). In October 1998 he was elected member of the Zala County Assembly. From December of the same year he was chairman and since 2000 he has been deputy chairman of the Cultural Committee of the Alliance of Cities with County Status.

In the 1998 parliamentary elections he was a candidate of Fidesz. He joined Fidesz - Hungarian Civic Party (FIDESZ-MPP) in 1999. On 20 October 2002 he was elected mayor for the second time. On 21 April 2002 he was elected individual representative for Constituency I (Zalaegerszeg), Zala County. In the autumn of 2003, at the beginning of the party's restructuring into a people's party he was charged with heading the Zalaegerszeg constituency. Since the beginning of the term he had been member of the Local Government Committee. He was elected MP from the Zala County Constituency I in the 2006 and 2010 elections. He was member of the Parliamentary Committee on Culture and the Media.

== Personal life ==
He is married. His first wife was Dr Malvina Gyimesinép Papp. They had together a daughter, Katalin and a son, Márton.

== Awards ==
- Mayor of the Year (2008)

Political offices
Preceded by Imre Bogár	Mayor of Zalaegerszeg; 1994–2010	Succeeded by Csaba Gyutai
