= Gyula Vantara =

Hungarian engineer and politician

Member of the National Assembly
- In office 14 May 2010 – 7 May 2018

Mayor of Békéscsaba
- In office 1 October 2006 – 12 October 2014
- Preceded by: János Pap
- Succeeded by: Péter Szarvas

Personal details
- Born: 19 November 1954 (age 71) Békéscsaba, Hungary
- Party: Fidesz
- Spouse: Mária Vantara
- Children: Gyula Gábor; Tamás
- Profession: politician

Gyula Vantara (born November 19, 1954) is a Hungarian engineer and politician, who was elected mayor of Békéscsaba in the 2006 local elections. He was also member of the National Assembly (MP) for Békéscsaba (Békés County Constituency I) from 2010 to 2018.

== Personal life ==
He speaks beside Hungarian also English and Slovak. His role model is Lajos Haán Lutheran pastor of Békéscsaba. He is married to Mária Vantara chemist. They have two sons, Gyula Gábor and Tamás.
