= Ferenc Szalay =

Hungarian politician

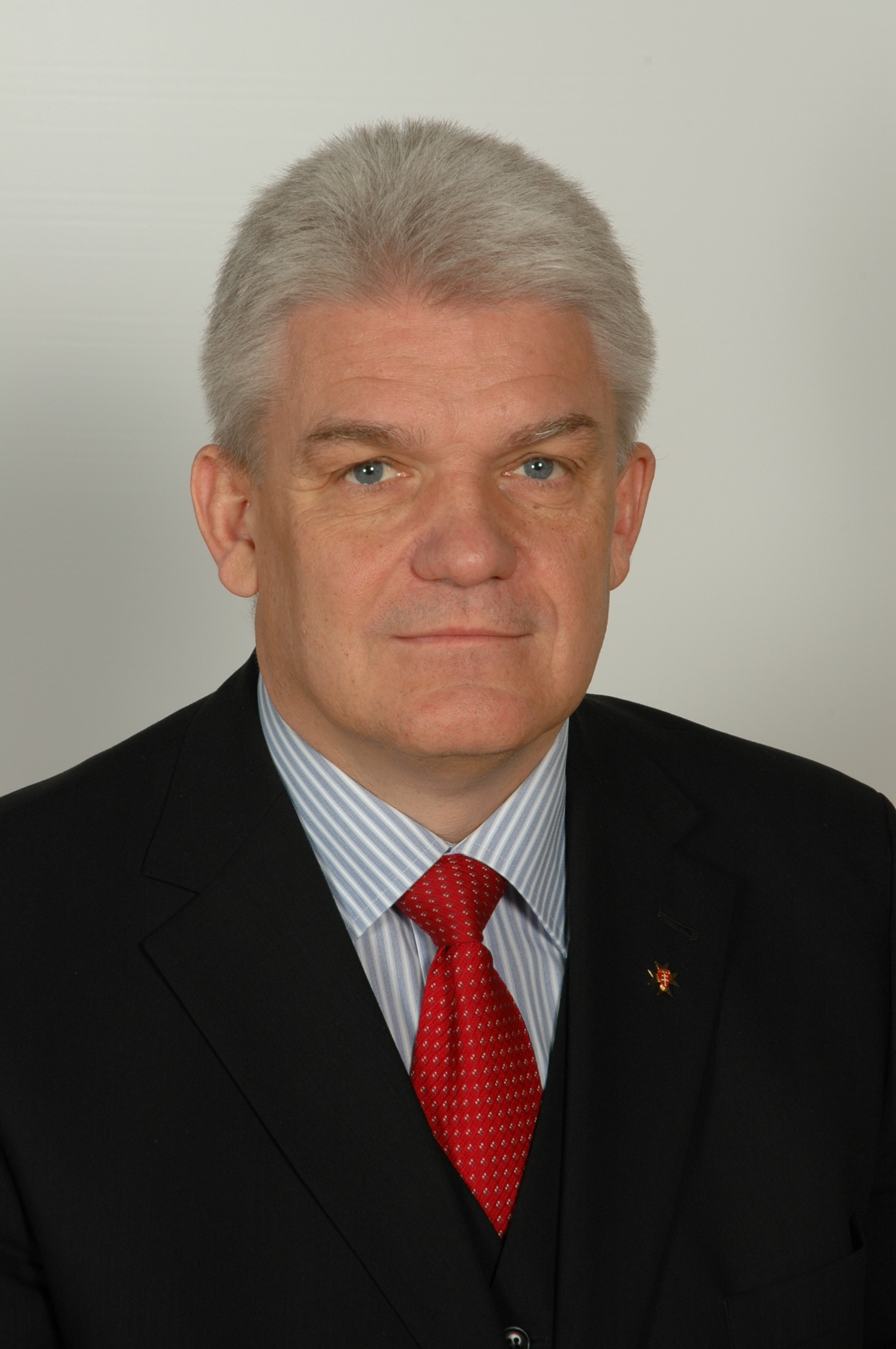

Mayor of Szolnok
- Incumbent
- Assumed office 1 October 2006
- Preceded by: Julianna Mária Botka
- In office 18 October 1998 – 20 October 2002
- Preceded by: Attila Várhegyi
- Succeeded by: Julianna Mária Botka

Member of the National Assembly
- In office 15 May 2002 – 5 May 2014

Personal details
- Born: 30 March 1955 (age 70) Esztergom, Hungary
- Party: Fidesz (since 1997)
- Spouse: Julianna Farkas
- Children: 2
- Profession: jurist, politician

Ferenc Szalay (born 30 March 1955) is a Hungarian politician, the mayor of Szolnok from 1998 to 2002 and since 2006. He was also a member of the National Assembly (MP) between 2002 and 2014.

== Awards ==
- Mayor of the Year (2009)
