= Nyíregyháza =

City in northeastern Hungary

- City with county rights
- Nyíregyháza Megyei Jogú Város
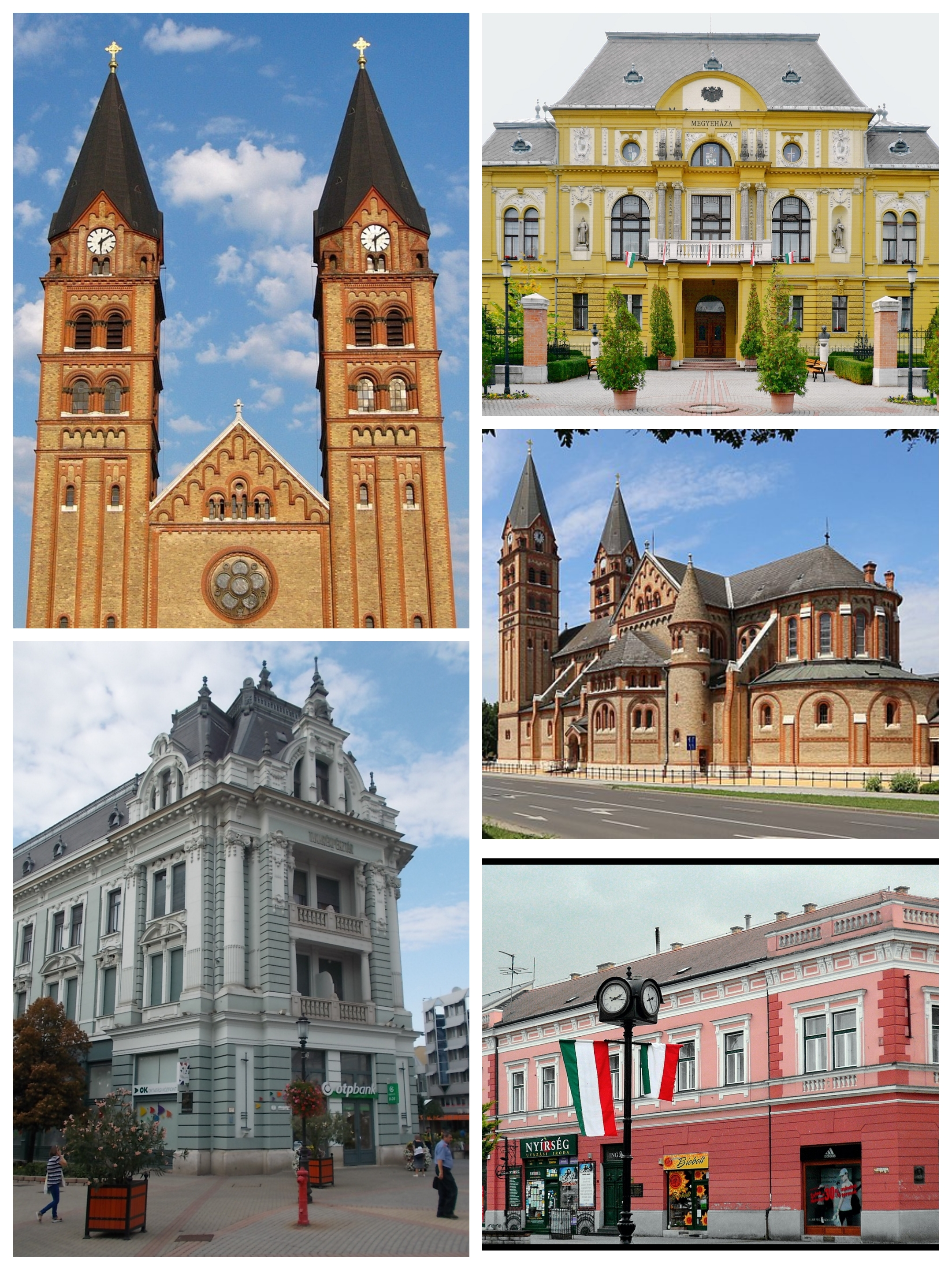
- Left: Our Lady of Nyíregyháza Cathedral, Saving Palace (Takarekpalota) Right: Nyíregyháza City Hall, A view of Cathedral from Kossuth Street, 25 Kossuth Street (All items were from above to bottom)

- Flag Coat of arms

- Location within Szabolcs-Szatmár-Bereg County Location within Hungary
- Coordinates: 47.95306°N 21.72713°E
- Country: Hungary
- Region: Northern Great Plain
- County: Szabolcs-Szatmár-Bereg
- District: Nyíregyháza
- Established: 9th century AD
- Market town: 1786

Government
  - Mayor: Dr Ferenc Kovács (Fidesz)
  - Deputy Mayor: Menyhért Jászai (Fidesz-KDNP); Dr Attila Ulrich (Fidesz-KDNP)
  - Town Notary: Dr Sándor Szemán

Area
  - City with county rights: 274.46 km^{2} (105.97 sq mi)
- Elevation: 116 m (381 ft)

Population (2017)
  - City with county rights: 117,689
  - Rank: 7th in Hungary
  - Density: 425.92/km^{2} (1,103.1/sq mi)
  - Urban: 238,020 (3rd)

Population by ethnicity
  - Hungarians: 86.1%
  - Roma: 1.8%
  - Germans: 0.5%
  - Ukrainians: 0.4%
  - Romanians: 0.3%
  - Slovaks: 0.2%
  - Rusyns: 0.1%
  - Bulgarians: 0.1%
  - Poles: 0.1%

Population by religion
  - Roman Catholic: 21.0%
  - Greek Catholic: 10.6%
  - Calvinists: 16.4%
  - Lutherans: 7.0%
  - Jews: 0.1%
  - Other: 1.8%
  - Non-religious: 14.6%
  - Unknown: 28.5%
- Time zone: UTC+1 (CET)
  - Summer (DST): UTC+2 (CEST)
- Postal code: 4400 to 4433
- Area code: (+36) 42
- Motorways: M3 Motorway
- NUTS 3 code: HU323
- Distance from Budapest: 233 km (145 mi) East
- Airport: Nyíregyháza
- MP: Tünde Szabó (Fidesz); Győző Vinnai (Fidesz)
- Website: nyiregyhaza.hu

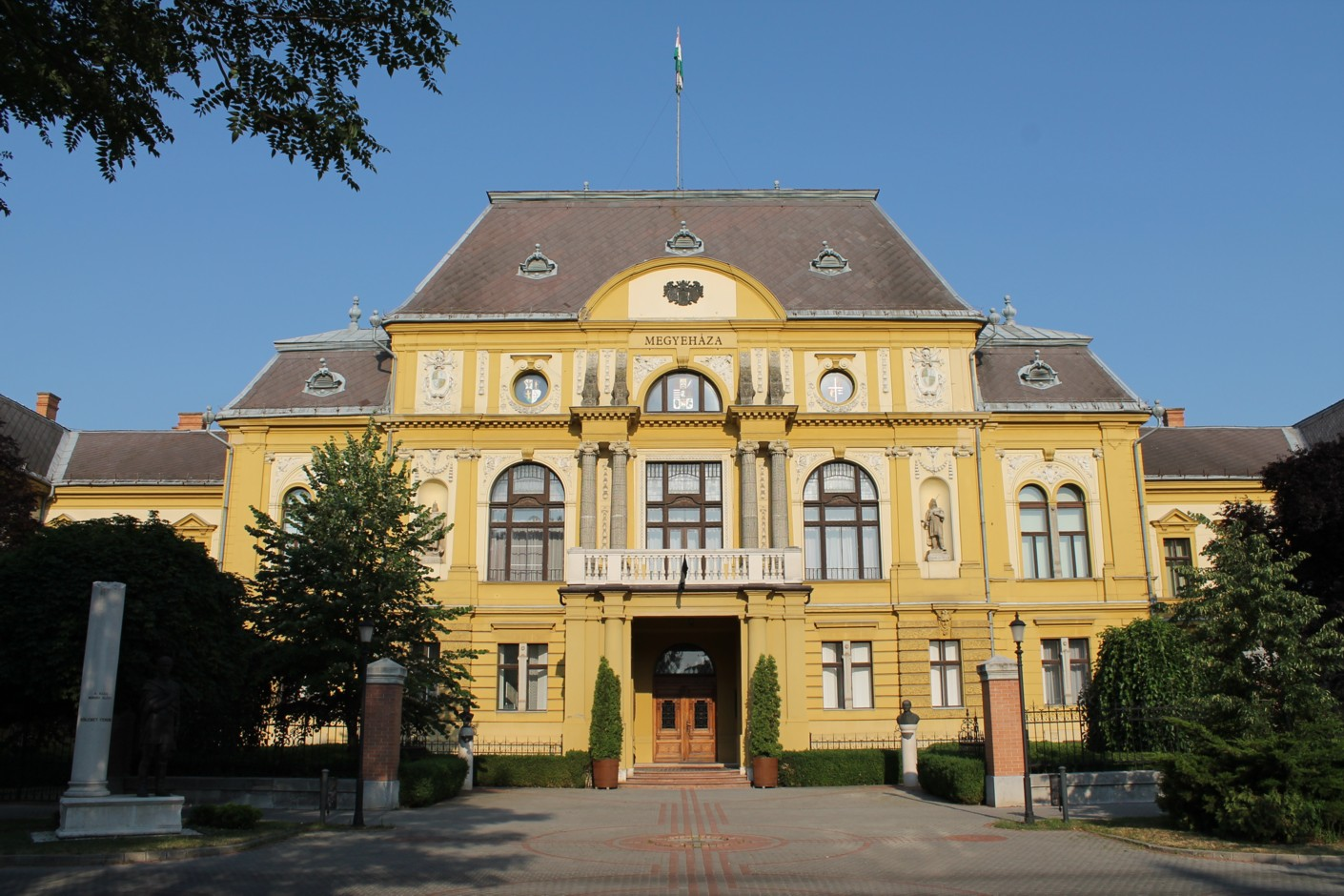
County Hall, Nyíregyháza by Ignác Alpár

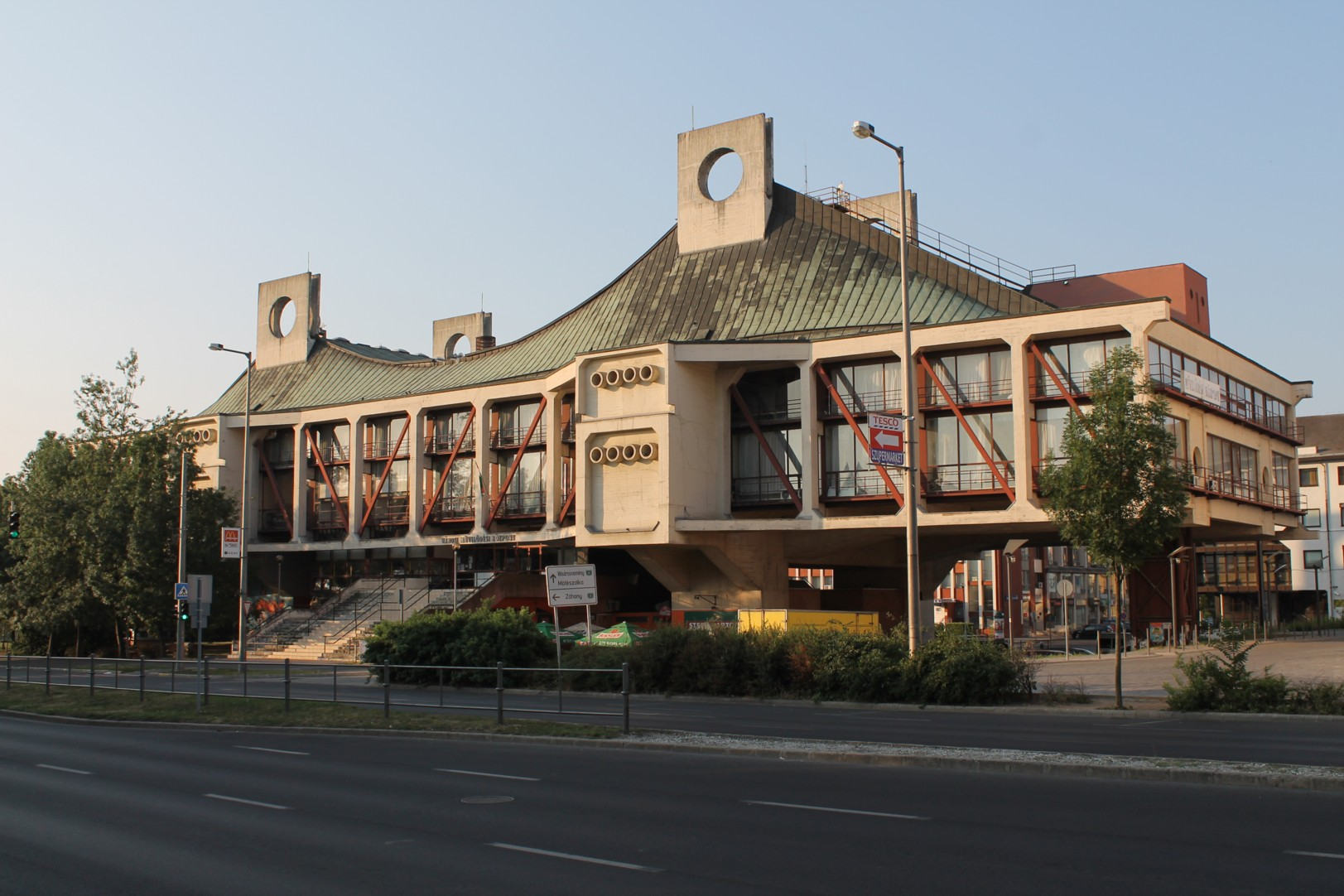
Váci Mihály Municipal Cultural Centre, Nyíregyháza by Ferenc Bán

Nyíregyháza (Hungarian: [ˈɲiːrɛchaːzɒ], Slovak: Níreďháza [ˈɲiːrɛɟɦaːza]) is a city with county rights in northeastern Hungary and the county capital of Szabolcs-Szatmár-Bereg. With a population of 118,001, it is the seventh-largest city in Hungary and the second largest in the Northern Great Plain region. Its development has been ongoing since the 18th century, making it the economic and cultural center of the region. Nyíregyháza Zoo, with over 500 species, is recognized throughout Europe.

== Geography ==
Nyíregyháza is located in Szabolcs-Szatmár-Bereg County in the northern Plain region, which also comprises Hajdú-Bihar County and Jász-Nagykun-Szolnok County. It is located in the center of Nyírség as an agricultural town. The boundaries of the city are often understood as a very broad frame, because generally the near suburbs are included in them. It is located at the intersections of routes 4, 41, 36, and 38, making the city easy to reach, lying at the crossroads to Sub-Carpathia and Transylvania.

=== Climate ===
Nyíregyháza's climate is classified as humid continental climate (Köppen Dfb). Among them, the annual average temperature is 10.7 °C (51.3 °F), the hottest month in July is 21.4 °C (70.5 °F), and the coldest month is −1.2 °C (29.8 °F) in January. The annual precipitation is 546.0 millimetres (21.50 in), of which July is the wettest with 67.9 millimetres (2.67 in), while January is the driest with only 26.5 millimetres (1.04 in). The extreme temperature throughout the year ranged from −19.2 °C (−2.6 °F) on 28 December 1996 to 39.3 °C (102.7 °F) on 20 July 2007.

Climate data for Nyíregyháza, 1991−2020 normals
Month	Jan	Feb	Mar	Apr	May	Jun	Jul	Aug	Sep	Oct	Nov	Dec	Year
Record high °C (°F)	14.6 (58.3)	18.6 (65.5)	24.3 (75.7)	31.7 (89.1)	32.9 (91.2)	35.6 (96.1)	39.3 (102.7)	38.2 (100.8)	35.6 (96.1)	26.9 (80.4)	24.1 (75.4)	15.4 (59.7)	39.3 (102.7)
Mean daily maximum °C (°F)	1.5 (34.7)	4.4 (39.9)	10.6 (51.1)	17.7 (63.9)	22.5 (72.5)	25.8 (78.4)	27.8 (82.0)	27.9 (82.2)	22.2 (72.0)	15.9 (60.6)	9.0 (48.2)	2.7 (36.9)	15.7 (60.3)
Daily mean °C (°F)	−1.2 (29.8)	0.7 (33.3)	5.8 (42.4)	11.9 (53.4)	16.4 (61.5)	19.8 (67.6)	21.4 (70.5)	21.3 (70.3)	16.0 (60.8)	10.6 (51.1)	5.2 (41.4)	0.1 (32.2)	10.7 (51.3)
Mean daily minimum °C (°F)	−3.6 (25.5)	−2.4 (27.7)	1.5 (34.7)	6.5 (43.7)	10.8 (51.4)	14.3 (57.7)	15.6 (60.1)	15.3 (59.5)	10.8 (51.4)	6.2 (43.2)	2.0 (35.6)	−2.1 (28.2)	6.2 (43.2)
Record low °C (°F)	−18.8 (−1.8)	−18.9 (−2.0)	−13.4 (7.9)	−4.0 (24.8)	−0.2 (31.6)	6.8 (44.2)	8.4 (47.1)	6.8 (44.2)	0.9 (33.6)	−7.6 (18.3)	−13.4 (7.9)	−19.2 (−2.6)	−19.2 (−2.6)
Average precipitation mm (inches)	26.5 (1.04)	30.9 (1.22)	27.9 (1.10)	39.9 (1.57)	58.7 (2.31)	63.5 (2.50)	67.9 (2.67)	46.0 (1.81)	50.8 (2.00)	44.2 (1.74)	41.2 (1.62)	48.5 (1.91)	546.0 (21.50)
Average precipitation days (≥ 1.0 mm)	6.1	6.5	5.7	6.6	8.7	8.3	8.1	5.9	6.5	6.7	7.0	7.6	83.7
Average relative humidity (%)	88.4	78.5	66.9	60.8	65.1	67.9	68.2	67.8	72.9	77.6	83.4	88.3	73.8
Source: NOAA

== History ==
The first written mentions of Nyíregyháza date back to 1209, although it was then called simply Nyír ('birch'), after the Nyírség, the greater region in which the city lies. A source from 1326 mentions that by then the city already had a church, hence the second part of the name, egyház (meaning 'church'). By the middle of the 15th century, the town had about 400 inhabitants. In the 16th century, during the Turkish occupation of Hungary, Nyíregyháza became deserted; it was resettled only in the 1630s–1640s.

After the War for Independence led by Prince Francis II Rákóczi, the town's population increased. Most new settlers were Slovaks from the area of Békéscsaba. In 1786, Nyíregyháza was granted the right to hold four market days a year; by this time the town was the biggest in the county, with 7,500 inhabitants. In the early 19th century, Nyíregyháza was wealthy enough to secure freedom from its feudal lords, the Dessewffy and Károlyi families. During these prosperous years, the town got a new town hall, a hospital, several schools, and a restaurant by nearby Sóstó lake ("Salty Lake").

The town's inhabitants took an active part in the revolution and war for independence in 1848–49, and after the suppression of the revolution, several were imprisoned, among them the mayor, Márton Hatzel.

In the second half of the 19th century, Nyíregyháza became more and more urbanized, and in 1876, became the seat of Szabolcs County (now part of the larger integrated county Szabolcs-Szatmár-Bereg). In 1858, the railroad line reached Nyíregyháza; several new buildings were built, including a telegraph office, the main post office, and the theater. In 1881 the population consisted of 24,102 people, of which 13,534 were Hungarians, 8,678 Slovaks, 389 Germans and 1,501 of other ethnicities. In 1911, the tramway network was complete. After the grim years of World War I and the Hungarian–Romanian War, Nyíregyháza remained under Romanian occupation for ten months. Between the two world wars, the city celebrated the 100th anniversary of its independence from feudal landowners.

== Jewish Community of Nyiregyhaza ==
As of the Act of 1840 Jews began to live in Nyiregyhaza. According to the 1941 Census, out of close to 60,000 residents, 5000 were Jewish.

During World War II, Jews were used as forced laborers by Hungarians and sent to labor camps. After the German invasion, in April1944, more than 6,000 of the city's Jewish inhabitants and inhabitants of nearby villages were placed in ghettos. In June the ghetto was liquidated and the Jews were sent by cattle cars to concentration camps, primarily, deported to Auschwitz. Only 600-800 of the Jews survived the death camps. Details of the expulsions and lists of the residents who were deported are provided in the Nagy book.

Several buildings were destroyed, too, including the Status Quo Synagogue, whose front wall was preserved and is now displayed in Nyíregyháza's Jewish Cemetery.

A monument in the memory of the Holocaust victims was constructed in 2004 at the Jewish cemetery.

== After the war ==
After the war, 2,000 Hungarians were sent to Soviet labor camps (colloquially called malenky robot, or "little work").

From the 1960s, the city grew and developed quickly. Today, Nyíregyháza is one of the most prosperous cities in Hungary, serving as both a center of education and a popular tourist destination. It is known for having a bar in every street.

Nyíregyháza is the birthplace of Israeli artist Zeev Kun (1930-2024).

== Population ==
With a population of 118,001, Nyíregyháza is the seventh-largest city in Hungary.

Historical population
Year	Pop.	±%
1870	13,015	—
1890	18,996	+46.0%
1900	28,073	+47.8%
1910	33,444	+19.1%
1920	38,751	+15.9%
1930	46,522	+20.1%
1941	53,917	+15.9%
1949	48,382	−10.3%
1960	56,834	+17.5%
1970	75,245	+32.4%
1980	108,235	+43.8%
1990	114,152	+5.5%
2001	118,795	+4.1%
2011	119,746	+0.8%
2022	116,439	−2.8%

Significant minority groups
Nationality	Population (2021)
Germany	613
Ukraine	465
Russia	337
Romania	305
Slovakia	214
Estonia	1

== Economy ==
After the fall of Communism, several foreign-owned companies appeared in the city. In the early 2000s, the largest employers were Hübner Flextronics Ltd. and Hirsch's, but during the period of economic recession, many companies eliminated several thousand jobs. Today, the largest public companies are the Lego Manufacturing Kft. and the Michelin Hungaria Abroncsgyártó Kft., providing employment for about 3,000 people.

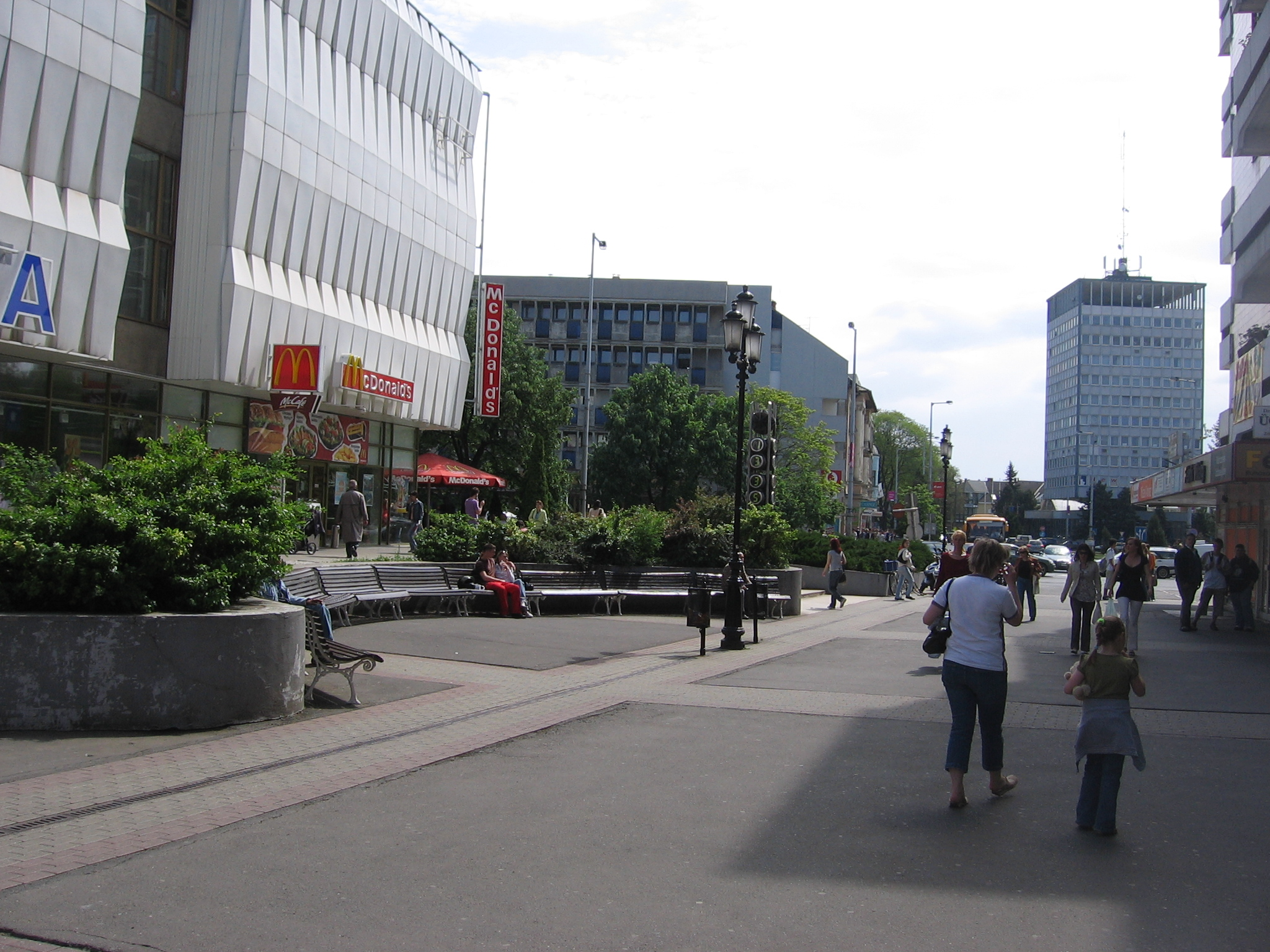
A part of downtown

== Religion ==
- Roman Catholic: During the 2011 census, 25,132 people, or 20.1% of the population, identified themselves as being Roman Catholic (8,365 fewer than in the 2001 census). The city is co-seat of the Diocese of Debrecen-Nyíregyháza. The church owns St. Emeric Catholic High School, Primary School and College and a kindergarten in the city.
- Greek Catholic: During the 2001 census, 12,742 people, or 10.6% of the population, identified themselves as being Greek Catholic (6,303 less than in 2001). The city is the seat of the only Hungarian Greek Catholic bishopric, the Diocese of Hajdúdorog. The Co-Cathedral of the Nyíregyháza St. Nicholas Greek Catholic Cathedral, other churches in the city: Jósaváros Greek Catholic Church, Nyíregyháza-Örökösföld Holy Trinity Greek Catholic Church, Nyíregyháza-Borbánya Mother of God Greek Catholic Church, Fox Mountain St Stephen's Chapel (Sóstóhegy), Nyírszőlős Birth of the Mother of God Greek Catholic Church, Nyíregyháza-Oros Protection of the Theotokos Greek Catholic Church, Rozsrétszőlősi Greek Catholic chapel. Here you will find the country's only Greek Catholic institution of higher learning, the St. Athanasius Greek Catholic Theological College. Other religious educational institutions include St. Nicholas Greek Catholic Kindergarten, Primary and Secondary School, Nicholas Soja Greek Catholic Primary School and Nursery (Huszar Colony).
- Reformed: During the 2011 census, 19,662 people, or 16.4% of the population, identified themselves as belonging to this religion (5,956 less than in 2001). The city is part of the East Hungarian Reformed Church District. Churches in the city are the Nyíregyháza City Reformed Church Temple, Nyíregyháza-Garden City Reformed Church Church of Nyíregyháza-Sóstói Reformed Church church Orosi Reformed Church Temple. Also maintained by the Church are the Jókai Reformed Primary School, Magdaléneum - Reformed Disability Nurse, Nursing Home, Mustard Seed Nursery, Kálvineum Nursing Home.
- Lutheran: During the 2011 census, 8,391 people, or 7% of the population, identified themselves as belonging to this religion (3,970 less than in 2001). Because of the city's Szabolcs Hajdu-diocese headquarters, especially in the 18th century Nyíregyháza újranépesítő tirpákok are important in the tradition of the Church. In 1947, the Hungarian-Slovak population exchange greatly contributed to the decrease in the number of believers. The denomination of the oldest and largest local church in the Nyíregyháza Lutheran Church Great Church, other churches: Evangelical small church, Nyíregyháza-Garden City Augsburg Confession Lutheran Church meetinghouses, Nyíregyháza Lutheran Church III. area Borbánya church Rozsrétszőlősi Bethlehem Lutheran church, the church Nyírszőlős Lutheran Church. The College of Nyíregyháza Budapest Protestant Theological University mel pricing religious cooperation is going well. Maintained by the Church's educational institutions: Lajos Kossuth Nyíregyháza Lutheran High School, Zoltan Turóczy Protestant English Bilingual Primary School and Nursery. The institution of the Emmaus Lutheran Church Charity Home Church also.
- Orthodox: During the 2011 census, 127 people declared themselves as belonging to this religion. The St George the Martyr Orthodox chapel falls under the Hungarian Orthodox Diocese.

== Transportation ==
National road traffic to Budapest goes through the M3 motorway and four national highways (4, 36, 38, 41) and the lower state roads, other cities of the country and the settlements of Szabolcs-Szatmár-Bereg county. Szabolcs Volán Zrt. Launches long-haul flights to major cities in the region and to larger towns in the country.

Due to the nature of the city junction, Nyíregyháza's road network is heavily loaded. The city center is surrounded by a 2X2-lane "highway". And the narrow city center is bordered by the "small boulevard", the northern, eastern and southern parts of which have already been completed. The M3 motorway, which recently reached the city, will hopefully reduce traffic and congestion on roads passing through the city center. At the same time the motorway reached the city, the east bypass (main road 403) was opened, allowing those traveling between Budapest and Záhony to avoid the city. Those coming to Debrecen no longer have to cross the city. The Nyíregyháza ring road includes the already completed 403 road and the M3 motorway south of the city. The missing parts of the ring road are Highway 338 (already authorized, but with an unknown construction date) in the west and the northern sector.

The most important of its railway connections is the 100 electric tram line between Szolnok and Záhony, from where the number 80 line to Tokaj, 113 line to Mátészalka and 116 line to Vásárosnamény branch out. Nyíregyháza is the final stop of the Ohat-Pusztakócs-Nyíregyháza railway line, which provides passenger traffic to Tiszalök. Next to the station are the Nyírvidék small railway to Dombrád and Balsa, which closed in December 2009. Nyíregyháza is one of the busiest railway stations in the country. There are InterCity flights to Budapest every hour to Debrecen and Miskolc. Nyíregyháza welcomes visitors to the city in a new and modern station building.

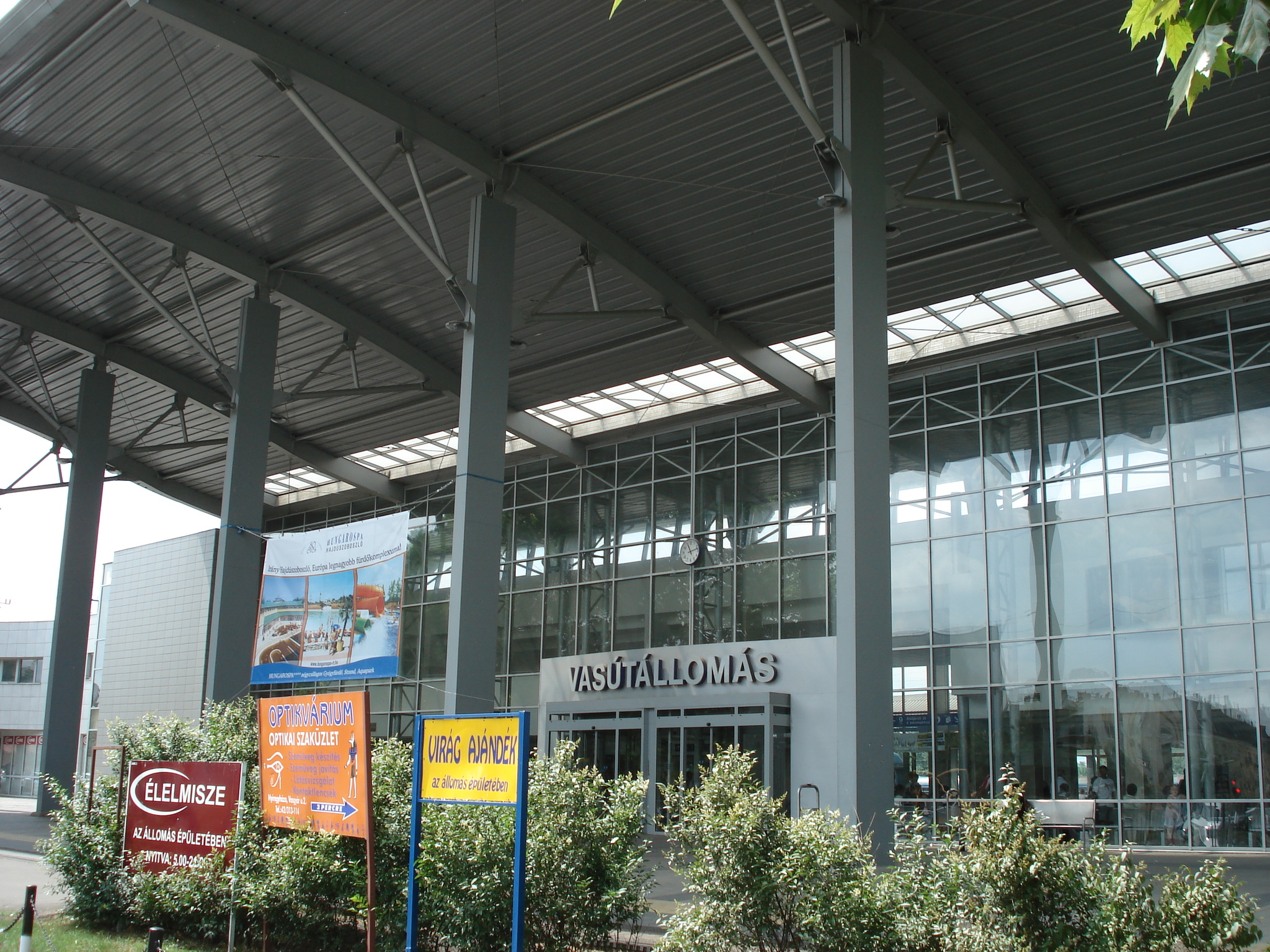
Central Train station

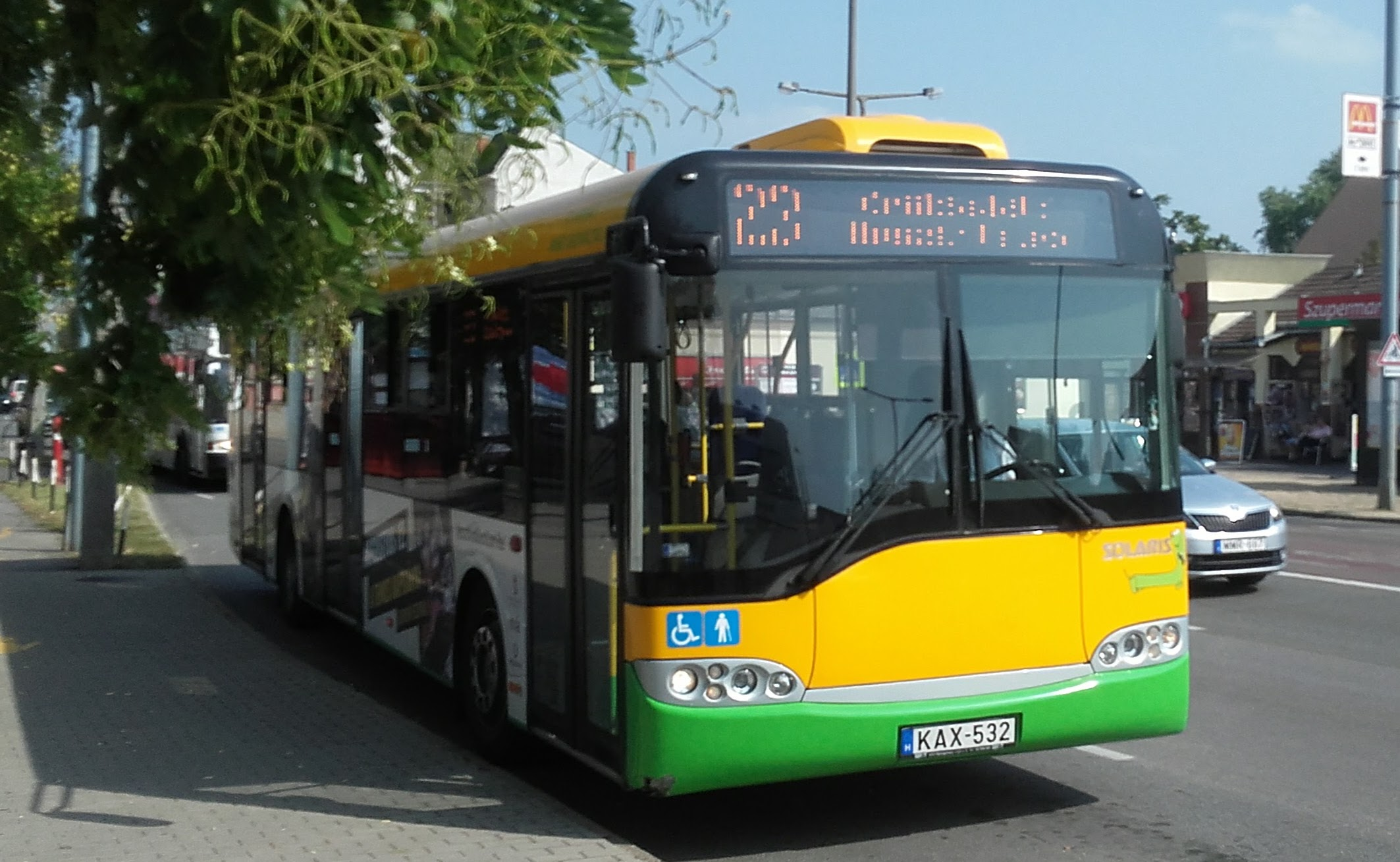
Solaris Urbino on Line 23

== Tourist sights ==
Nyiregyháza's Roman Catholic church with the newly built fountain in the foreground

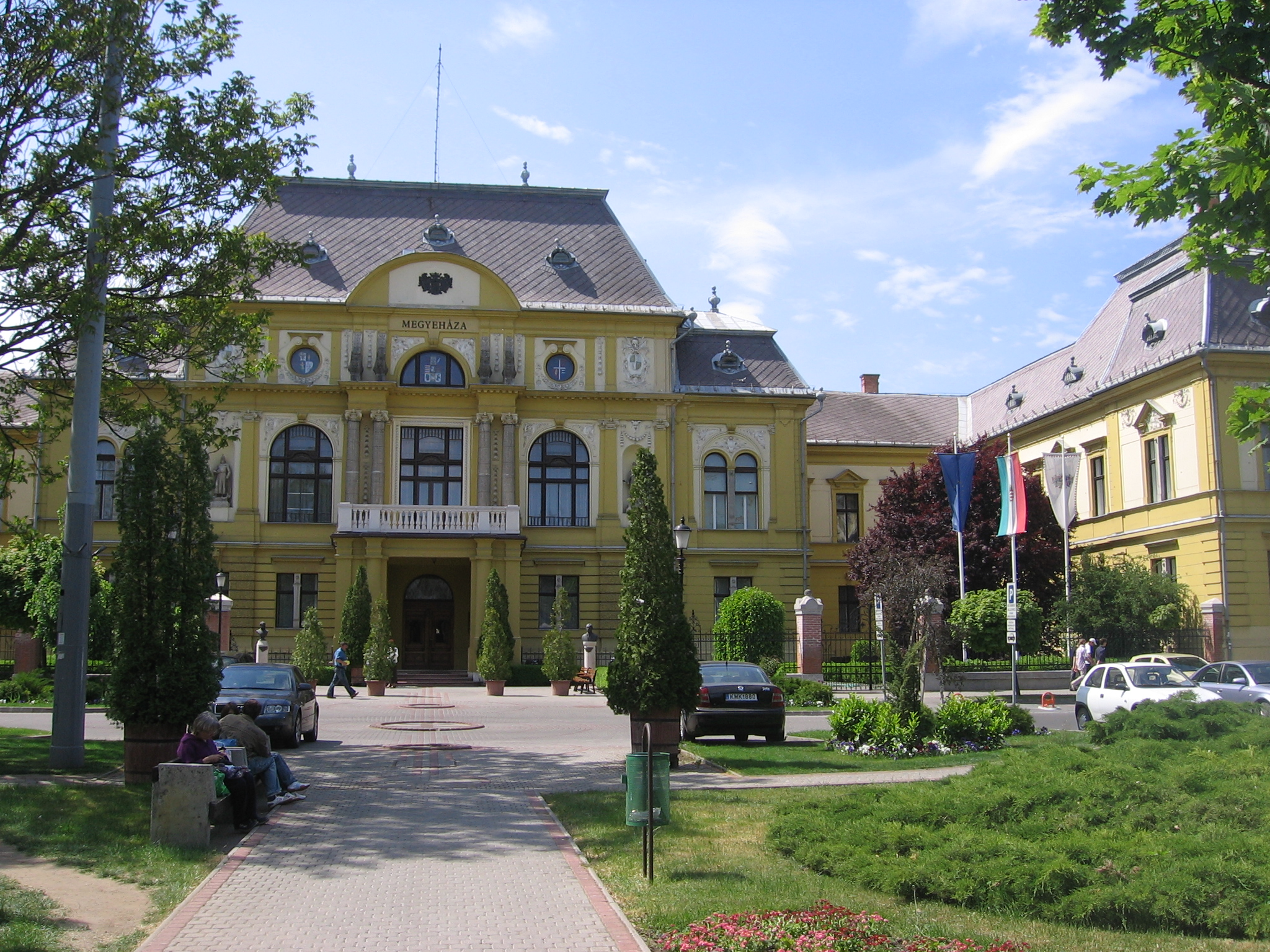
County Hall

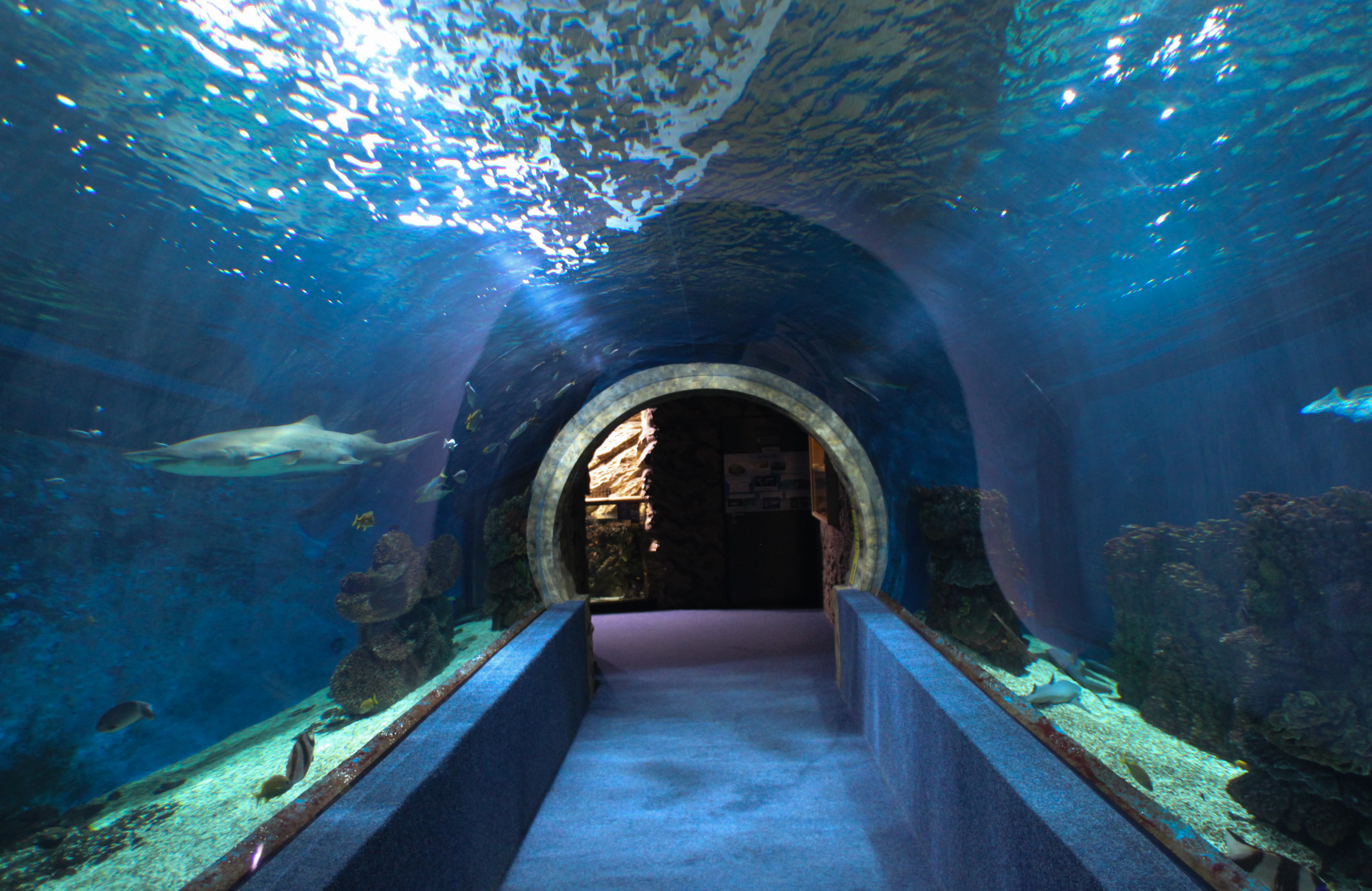
Nyíregyháza Zoo

Nyíregyháza also has several museums and exhibitions, showing the city's rich cultural heritage.

- Collection of the International Medallion Art and Small Sculpture Creative Community of Nyíregyháza-Sóstó – periodic exhibitions of works of contemporary artists

== Politics ==
The current mayor of Nyíregyháza is Ferenc Kovács (Fidesz-KDNP).

The local Municipal Assembly, elected in the 2019 local government elections, is made up of 22 members (1 mayor, 15 individual constituency MEPs and 6 compensation List MEPs) divided into the following political parties and alliances:

Party	Seats	Current Municipal Assembly
Fidesz-KDNP	13	M
Opposition coalition (Note: Coalition of Mindenki Magyarországa-LMP-Association of Independents-Jobbik-MSZP-Dialogue-Momentum-DK.)	9	

=== List of mayors since 1990 ===
Member	Party	Term of office
Zoltán Mádi	Fidesz	1990–1994
Lászlóné Csabai	MSZP	1994–2010
Ferenc Kovács	Fidesz	2010–

== Sport ==
The city is home to Hübner Nyíregyháza BS, a First division basketball team that plays its home games at the Continental Arena. Football club Nyíregyháza Spartacus play in the country's top tier (in 2024-25) and their stadium is the Városi Stadion.

The Rally Hungary is a rally race headquartered in Nyíregyháza that is part of the European Rally Championship since 2019.

The Volán Sporttelep (Entrance on Czuczor Gergely utca) is an association football venue and former motorcycle speedway track. It has been a significant venue for speedway and has hosted many events, including qualifying rounds of the Speedway World Championship (the first in 1990) and a qualifying round of the Speedway World Team Cup in 1989. The last speedway is believed to have take place in 1997.

== Twin towns – sister cities ==
Nyíregyháza is twinned with:

- Baia Mare, Romania
- Bielsko-Biała, Poland
- Harbin, China
- Iserlohn, Germany
- Kajaani, Finland
- Kiryat Motzkin, Israel
- Prešov, Slovakia
- Rzeszów, Poland
- Satu Mare, Romania
- St Albans, England, United Kingdom
- Uzhhorod, Ukraine

== Notable residents ==
- Gyula Benczúr - painter
- Márton Fucsovics - professional tennis player
- Dániel Gazdag - footballer
- Miklós Kállay
- Gyula Krúdy
- Jozef Markuš (1944–2025), Slovak politician; born in Nyíregyháza
- György Mitró
- Gábor Nógrádi - author, screenwriter, playwright, essayist, publicist and poet
- Alex Pongrass (Sándor Pongrácz) - businessman and football administrator

== Broadcasting ==
Near Nyíregyháza, at 47°56′12.17″N 21°45′28.35″E, stands the radio mast. Built in 1952, it is a 115-metre (377 ft) tall guyed mast radiator, used for broadcasting on 1251 kHz (AM).
