= Zsolt Páva =

Politician

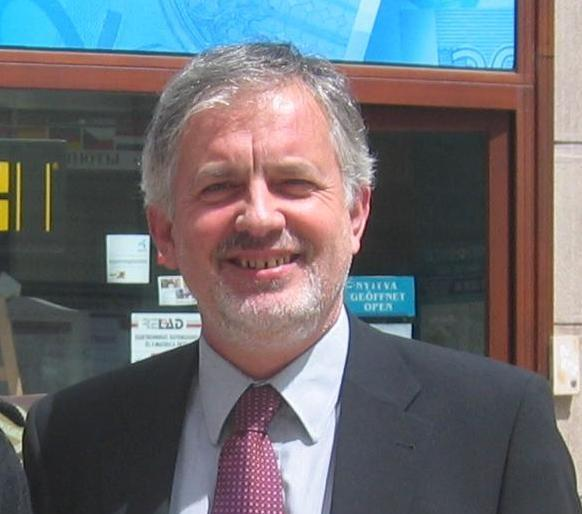

Mayor of Pécs
- In office 2009–2019
- Preceded by: Péter Tasnádi
- Succeeded by: Attila Péterffy
- In office 1994–1998
- Preceded by: Zoltán Krippl
- Succeeded by: László Toller

Personal details
- Born: 30 October 1955 (age 70) Pécs, Hungary
- Party: Fidesz
- Spouse: Dr Andrea Barth
- Children: Réka; Lőrinc; Sarolt
- Occupation: Politician

Zsolt Páva (born 30 October 1955) is a Hungarian politician. Páva is a member of Fidesz and mayor of Pécs from 2009 to 2019. He also served as mayor of his hometown between 1994 and 1998.

Political offices
Preceded by Zoltán Krippl	Mayor of Pécs; 1994–1998	Succeeded by László Toller
Preceded by Péter Tasnádi	Mayor of Pécs; 2009–2019	Succeeded by Attila Péterffy
