= Csaba Szabó (politician) =

Hungarian politician

Member of the National Assembly
- In office 14 May 2010 – 5 May 2014

Personal details
- Born: 1968 (age 57–58)
- Party: Fidesz (since 1990)
- Profession: politician

Csaba Szabó (born 1968) is a Hungarian politician, member of the National Assembly (MP) from Nógrád County Regional List from 2010 to 2014.

Szabó has been the mayor of Hollókő since 1998. He was elected a member of the Parliamentary Committee on Culture and Press on 14 May 2010.
