= Ferenc Kovács (politician, born 1960) =

Hungarian politician (born 1960)

Mayor of Nyíregyháza
- Incumbent
- Assumed office 3 October 2010
- Preceded by: Judit Csabai

Member of the National Assembly
- In office 14 May 2010 – 5 May 2014

Personal details
- Born: 1960 (age 65–66) Pap, Hungary
- Party: Fidesz
- Children: 3
- Profession: jurist

Dr. Ferenc Kovács (born 1960) is a Hungarian jurist and politician, member of the National Assembly (MP) for Nyíregyháza (Szabolcs-Szatmár-Bereg County Constituency I) from 2010 to 2014. He is the current mayor of Nyíregyháza from 3 October 2010.

He was a member of the Constitutional, Judicial and Standing Orders Committee between 14 May 2010 and 7 March 2011; he therefore participated in the drawing up of the new constitution in the spring of 2011. After that he held the position of vice chairman of the Committee of National Cohesion since 1 January 2011.

== Personal life ==
He is married and has three children.

Political offices
Preceded by Judit Csabai	Mayor of Nyíregyháza; 2010–	Succeeded by Incumbent
