= László Habis =

Hungarian politician and economist

Mayor of Eger
- In office 1 October 2006 – 13 October 2019
- Preceded by: Imre Nagy
- Succeeded by: Ádám Mirkóczki

Member of the National Assembly
- In office 14 May 2010 – 5 May 2014

Personal details
- Born: June 20, 1952 (age 73) Eger, Hungary
- Party: Fidesz, KDNP
- Spouse: Lászlóné Habis (née Mária Mezei)
- Children: László; Helga
- Profession: Economist, politician

László Habis (born 20 June 1952) is a Hungarian politician, who served as the mayor of Eger from 2006 to 2019. He was a member of the National Assembly (MP) for Eger (Heves County Constituency I) from 2010 to 2014.
