= Sándor Káli =

Hungarian politician

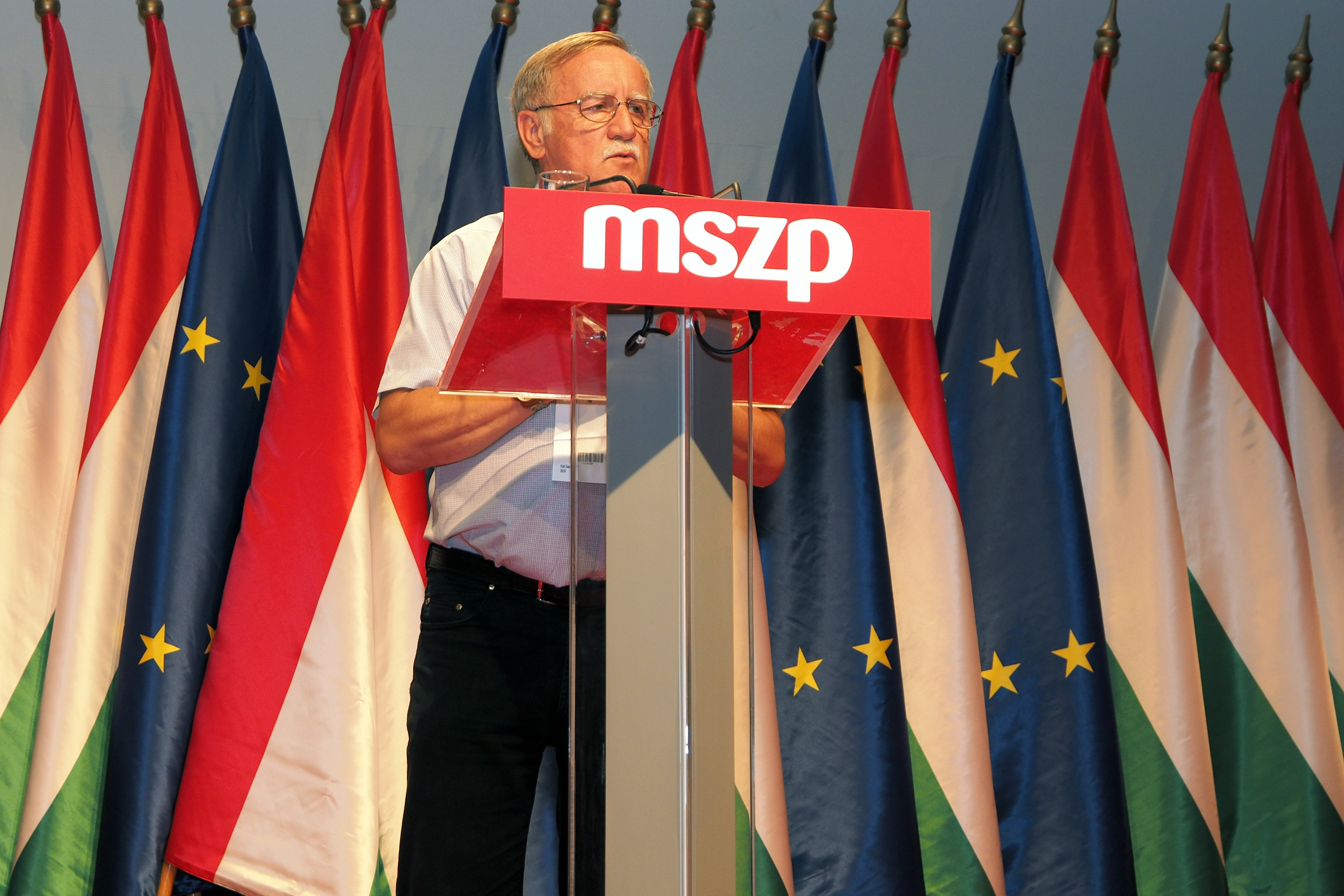

Mayor of Miskolc
- In office October 20, 2002 – October 3, 2010
- Preceded by: Tamás Kobold
- Succeeded by: Ákos Kriza

Personal details
- Born: July 3, 1951 (age 74) Budapest, Hungary
- Party: MSZMP, MSZP
- Occupation: Politician

Sándor Káli (born July 3, 1951) is a Hungarian politician and Member of Parliament. Káli is a member of the Hungarian Socialist Party and a former mayor of Miskolc from October 20, 2002 to October 3, 2010.

Political offices
| Preceded by Tamás Kobold | Mayor of Miskolc; 2002–2010 | Succeeded by Ákos Kriza |
