= Roland Mengyi =

Hungarian jurist and politician

Member of the National Assembly
- In office 14 May 2010 – 7 May 2018

Personal details
- Born: 1 March 1975 (age 51) Miskolc, Hungary
- Party: Fidesz
- Children: 5
- Profession: jurist, politician

Roland Mengyi (born 1 March 1975) is a Hungarian jurist and politician, member of the National Assembly (MP) for Tiszaújváros (Borsod-Abaúj-Zemplén County Constituency XII then VI) from 2010 to 2018. He was appointed President of the General Assembly of Borsod-Abaúj-Zemplén County in 2010, serving in this capacity until 2014.

== Career ==
He finished his academic studies at the Pázmány Péter Catholic University. Currently he attends the Faculty of Business Administration of the Corvinus University of Budapest. Mengyi became a member of the Parliamentary Committee on European Affairs on 14 May 2010. He also served as a member of the Economic and Information Technology Committee (from 2 November 2010 to 30 December 2011; and from 18 June 2012 to 5 May 2014). He was re-elected MP during the 2014 parliamentary election. Thereafter he became a member of the Legislative Committee, and beside that he functioned as a vice-chairman of the Economic Committee.

== Corruption charge ==
In early August 2016, weekly news magazine 168 Óra uncovered a corruption case around the State-initiated Social Renewal Operative Programme (TÁMOP), which suggested that Mengyi committed maladministration. According to leaked transcripts of telephone conversations, two businessmen turned to a third client during the tendering process, who claimed himself as a "friend of Mengyi". According to the conversation, the applicants wondered instead of the usual 50% of the total amount they would have to give back 90%. Following the investigation of the tax authority, the tender was revoked. After the article appeared, Mengyi denied the corruption charges and cast himself as the victim of criminals who abused his name. In September 2019, Mengyi was sentenced to 4 years in prison.
