= 2019 Budapest Assembly election =

- 13 Oct 2019

All 33 seats in the General Assembly of Budapest 17 seats needed for a majority
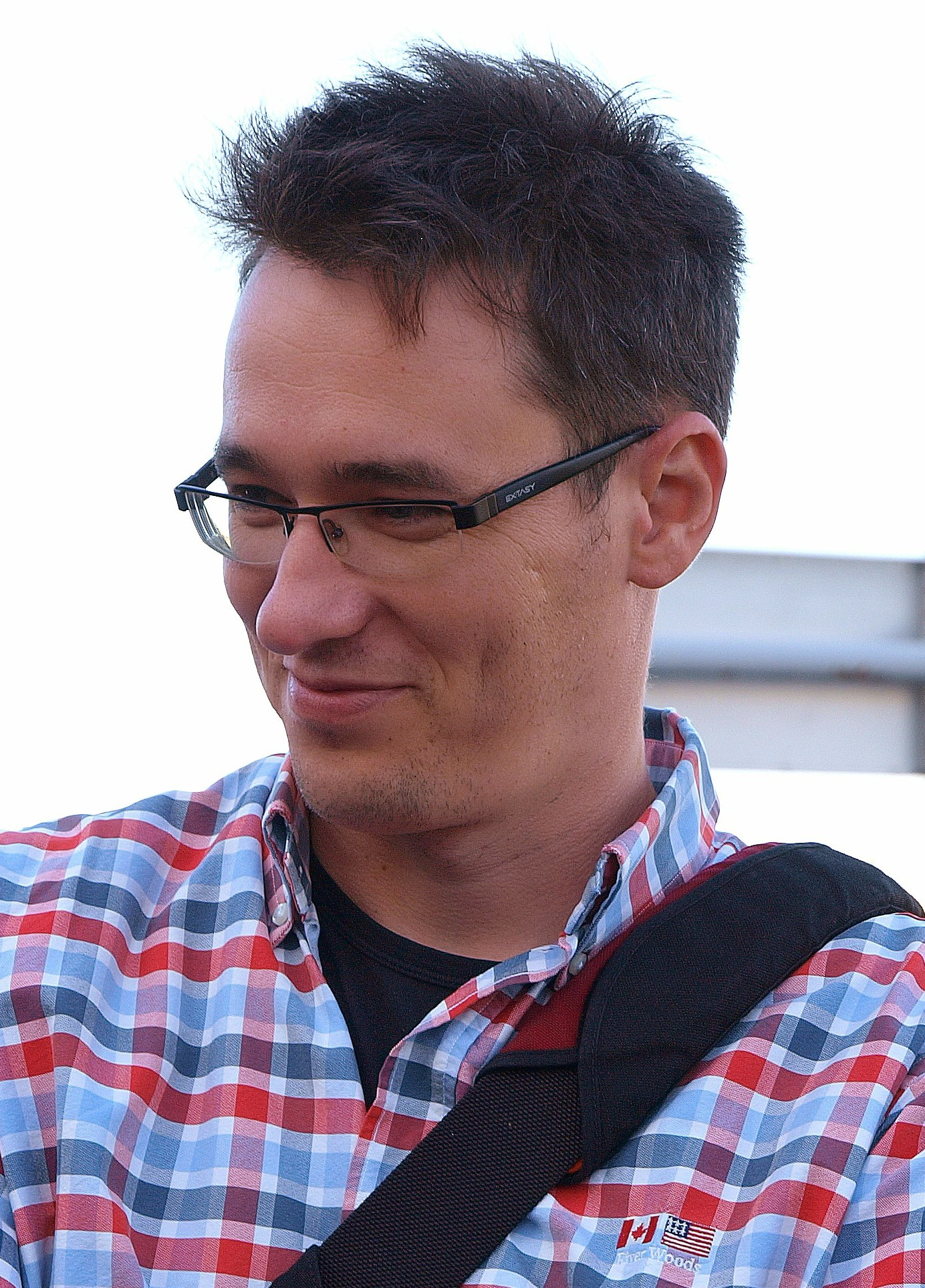

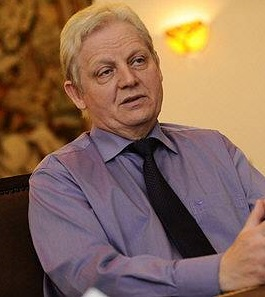
	First party	Second party
Leader	Gergely Karácsony	István Tarlós
Party	Momentum–DK–MSZP–Párbeszéd–LMP	Fidesz–KDNP
Last election	11 seats	20 seats
Seats won	18	13
Seat change	▲7	▼7
Popular vote	350,837	293,479
- Map showing district mayoral election winners by party colors.

The 2019 Budapest Assembly election was held on 13 October 2019, concurring with other local elections in Hungary. Voters elected the Mayor of Budapest, and the mayors of the 23 districts directly, while 9 seats in the assembly were distributed proportionally, taking into account votes cast for losing district mayoral candidates.

== Mayor ==
Gergely Karácsony was elected mayor with 50.86% of the vote, defeating incumbent István Tarlós who held the office since 2010.

== District mayors ==
The opposition won the majority of district mayoral races.

District	Incumbent	Party	Elected Mayor	Party
I.	Gábor Tamás Nagy	Fidesz–KDNP	Márta V. Naszályi	Opposition coalition Momentum–DK–MSZP–**Párbeszéd**–LMP
II.	Zsolt Láng	Fidesz–KDNP	Gergely Őrsi	Opposition coalition Momentum–DK–**MSZP**–Párbeszéd–LMP
III.	Balázs Bús	Fidesz–KDNP	László Kiss	Opposition coalition Momentum–DK–**MSZP**–Párbeszéd–LMP
IV.	Zsolt Wintermantel	Fidesz–KDNP	Tibor Déri	Opposition coalition **Momentum**–DK–MSZP–Párbeszéd–LMP
V.	Péter Szentgyörgyvölgyi	Fidesz–KDNP	Péter Szentgyörgyvölgyi	Fidesz–KDNP
VI.	Zsófia Hassay	Fidesz–KDNP	Tamás Soproni	Opposition coalition **Momentum**–DK–MSZP–Párbeszéd–LMP
VII.	Zsolt Vattamány	Fidesz–KDNP	Péter Niedermüller	Opposition coalition Momentum–**DK**–MSZP–Párbeszéd–LMP
VIII.	Botond Sára (Note: Elected in a by-election in 2018)	Fidesz–KDNP	András Pikó	Opposition coalition **Momentum**–DK–MSZP–Párbeszéd–LMP
IX.	János Bácskai	Fidesz–KDNP	Krisztina Baranyi	Opposition coalition (Note: Baranyi was an independent candidate supported by these parties); Momentum–DK–MSZP–Párbeszéd–LMP
X.	Róbert Kovács	Fidesz–KDNP	Róbert Kovács	Fidesz–KDNP
XI.	Tamás Hoffmann	Fidesz–KDNP	Imre László	Opposition coalition Momentum–**DK**–MSZP–Párbeszéd–LMP
XII.	Zoltán Pokorni	Fidesz–KDNP	Zoltán Pokorni	Fidesz–KDNP
XIII.	József Tóth	MSZP	József Tóth	Opposition coalition Momentum–DK–**MSZP**–Párbeszéd–LMP
XIV.	Gergely Karácsony	PM	Csaba Horváth	Opposition coalition Momentum–DK–**MSZP**–Párbeszéd–LMP
XV.	Angéla Németh (Note: Elected in a by-election in 2018)	DK	Angéla Németh	Opposition coalition Momentum–**DK**–MSZP–Párbeszéd–LMP
XVI.	Péter Kovács	Fidesz–KDNP	Péter Kovács	Fidesz–KDNP
XVII.	Levente Riz † (Note: Died in office 19 September 2019, after already announcing retirement)	Fidesz–KDNP	Tamás Horváth	Fidesz–KDNP
XVIII.	Attila Ughy	Fidesz–KDNP	Sándor Szaniszló	Opposition coalition Momentum–DK–**MSZP**–Párbeszéd–LMP
XIX.	Péter Gajda	MSZP	Péter Gajda	Opposition coalition Momentum–DK–**MSZP**–Párbeszéd–LMP
XX.	Ákos Szabados	Independent (Note: Left MSZP in 2015. Was supported by Fidesz–KDNP in the election.)	Ákos Szabados	Independent
XXI.	Lénárd Borbély	Fidesz–KDNP	Lénárd Borbély	Fidesz–KDNP
XXII.	Ferenc Karsay	Fidesz–KDNP	Ferenc Karsay	Fidesz–KDNP
XXIII.	Ferenc Geiger	Independent	Ferenc Bese	Independent

- Italics denote a mayor **not** running for reelection

In case of joint candidates, bold denotes the party to which the candidate personally belongs. In the 23 districts, 14 opposition or opposition supported candidates won, with 9 government-aligned or government-supported mayors. This is a sharp improvement for the opposition as they previously only occupied 4 of these mayorships.

In most of the cities, the assembly majority is composed of members aligned with the mayor, except:

- X., with a Fidesz-KDNP mayor, and no clear majority
- XX., with an independent (Fidesz-KDNP supported) mayor, and opposition majority
- XXI., with a Fidesz-KDNP mayor, and no clear majority
- XXII., with a Fidesz-KDNP mayor, and opposition majority

In XXIII., the mayor's civil organization together with Fidesz-KDNP members have a majority.

== Party list seats ==
Party	Votes for losing candidates	Additional seats
Fidesz–KDNP	195 274	6
Momentum–DK–MSZP–Párbeszéd–LMP	86 380	3

Candidates elected on the Fidesz–KDNP list:

1. István Tarlós (1.) – did not take his seat
2. Gábor Bagdy (2.)
3. Zsolt Láng (4.)
4. Zsófia Hassay (5.)
5. Zsolt Wintermantel (8.) – did not take his seat
6. Gábor Tamás Nagy (14.)

Candidates elected on the Momentum–DK–MSZP–Dialogue–LMP list:

1. Kata Tüttő (2., MSZP)
2. Erzsébet Gy. Németh (3., DK)
3. Gábor Havasi (4., Momentum)

Number in parentheses is the candidate's original position on the list, as some list candidates were elected to a mayorship.

Tarlós announced on 15 October 2019, that he won't take his seat. This caused Attila Ughy (list position 15) to take his seat instead. Zsolt Wintermantel did not take either his seat on 28 October; he was replaced by Gábor Pintér, according to the request of the Fidesz–KDNP alliance. Botond Sára (9.) and Tamás Hoffmann (11.) were elected into the local representative bodies in their districts, therefore they were excluded from the party compensation list.

== Breakdown of seats ==
The opposition won a majority in the Assembly, breaking over 15 years of a Fidesz majority.

Party	Seats (mayor)	Seats (district)	Seats (list)	All	Change	Group
MSZP	0	6	1	7	▲2	18
DK	0	3	1	4	▲2	18
Momentum	0	3	1	4	▲4	18
Párbeszéd	1	1	0	2	Steady	18
Other opposition	0	1	0	1	▲1	18
Fidesz–KDNP	0	7	6	13	▼7	13
Independents	0	2	0	2	▲1	2

== Detailed results ==
District	Fidesz-KDNP		Opposition		Others (only listed if >2%)			
I.	Gábor Tamás Nagy	5 904; 47.34%	**Márta V. Naszályi** (Dialogue)	**6 025**; **48.31%**	Eszter Jakab-Novák (Independent)	542; 4.35%		
II.	Zsolt Láng	19 377; 47.34%	**Gergely Őrsi** (MSZP)	**21 557**; **52.66%**				
III.	Balázs Bús	26 749; 49.58%	**László Kiss** (MSZP)	**27 206**; **50.42%**				
IV.	Zsolt Wintermantel	18 257; 45.7%	**Tibor Déri** (Momentum)	**20 174**; **50.5%**	Tibor Pajor (Our Homeland Movement)	891; 2.23%		
V.	**Péter Szentgyörgyvölgyi**	**5 450**; **52.49%**	Kata Tüttő (MSZP)	4 410; 42.47%	Pál Losonczy (Jobbik)	371; 3.57%		
VI.	Zsófia Hassay	5 409; 42.51%	**Tamás Soproni** (Momentum)	**7 314**; **57.49%**				
VII.	Zsolt Vattamány	7 093; 41.04%	**Péter Niedermüller** (DK)	**8 279**; **47.9%**	László Moldován (Independent)	1 009; 5.84%	György Hunvald (Independent)	902; 5.22%
VIII.	Botond Sára	10 972; 48.42%	**András Pikó** (nominated by Momentum)	**11 241**; **49.6%**				
IX.	János Bácskai	8 376; 39.54%	**Krisztina Baranyi** (Independent, selected in a primary)	**12 188**; **57.53%**				
X.	**Róbert Kovács**	**12 569**; **51.48%**	Csaba Somlyódy (MSZP)	10 922; 44.73%	István Tubák (Jobbik)	693; 2.84%		
XI.	Tamás Hoffmann	26 854; 43.19%	**Imre László** (DK)	**31 411**; **51.48%**	Domokos Lengyel (Independent)	2 014; 3.24%		
XII.	**Zoltán Pokorni**	**16 462**; **59.57%**	Norbert Élő (DK)	11 171; 40.43%				
XIII.	Gábor Bagdy	8 554; 18.11%	**József Tóth** (MSZP)	**38 669**; **81.89%**				
XIV.	Zoltán Rozgonyi	18 302; 37.03%	**Csaba Horváth** (MSZP)	**24 873**; **50.33%**	László Várnai (Independent)	5 177; 10.48%		
XV.	Gábor Pintér	12 063; 39.32%	**Angéla Németh** (DK)	**16 860**; **54.96%**	Judit Victorné Kovács (Independent)	1 505; 4.91%		
XVI.	**Péter Kovács**	**18 803**; **57.42%**	Gábor Nemes (DK)	12 705; 38.8%	Viktor Schaffer (Independent)	1 238; 3.78%		
XVII.	**Tamás Horváth**	**18 711**; **51.82%**	Erzsébet Gy. Németh (DK)	13 364; 37.01%	Gergő Fachet (Independent)	4 030; 11.16%		
XVIII.	Attila Ughy	18 554; 45.73%	**Sándor Szaniszló** (MSZP)	**20 698**; **51.02%**	István Luka (Independent)	854; 2.1%		
XIX.	Gabriella Dódity	8 810; 37.17%	**Péter Gajda** (MSZP)	**13 885**; **58.58%**	Gyula Fonyódi (Independent)	1 008; 4.25%		
XX.	none		Róbert Balog	10 549; 48.63%	**Ákos Szabados** (Independent)	**11 144**; **51.37%**		
XXI.	**Lénárd Borbély**	**14 899**; **52.54%**	Éva Erdősi (MSZP)	12 260; 43.23%	József Pákozdi (Independent)	971; 3.42%		
XXII.	**Ferenc Karsay**	**11 311**; **48.15%**	Gábor Havasi (Momentum)	10 999; 46.82%	János Iván (Independent)	1 181; 5.03%		
XXIII.	none		Miklós Bereczki (Jobbik)	4 077; 46.25%	**Ferenc Bese** (Independent)	**4 291**; **48.68%**	Zoltán Bernáth (Independent)	447; 5.07%

Italics means incumbent, bold means winner of the election.
