= 2014 Budapest Assembly election =

- 12 Oct 2014

All 33 seats in the General Assembly of Budapest 17 seats needed for a majority
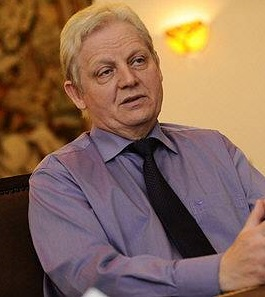

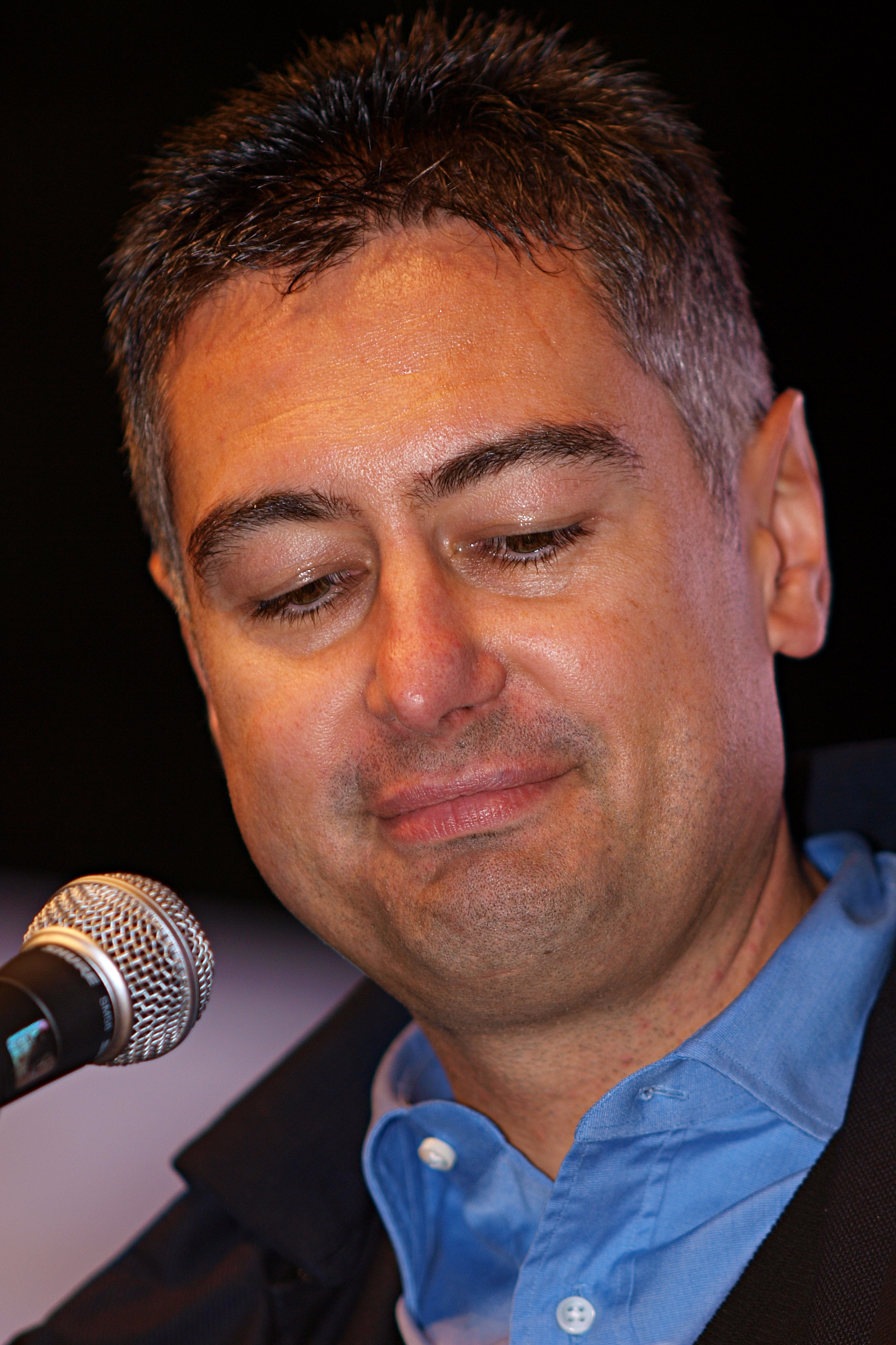

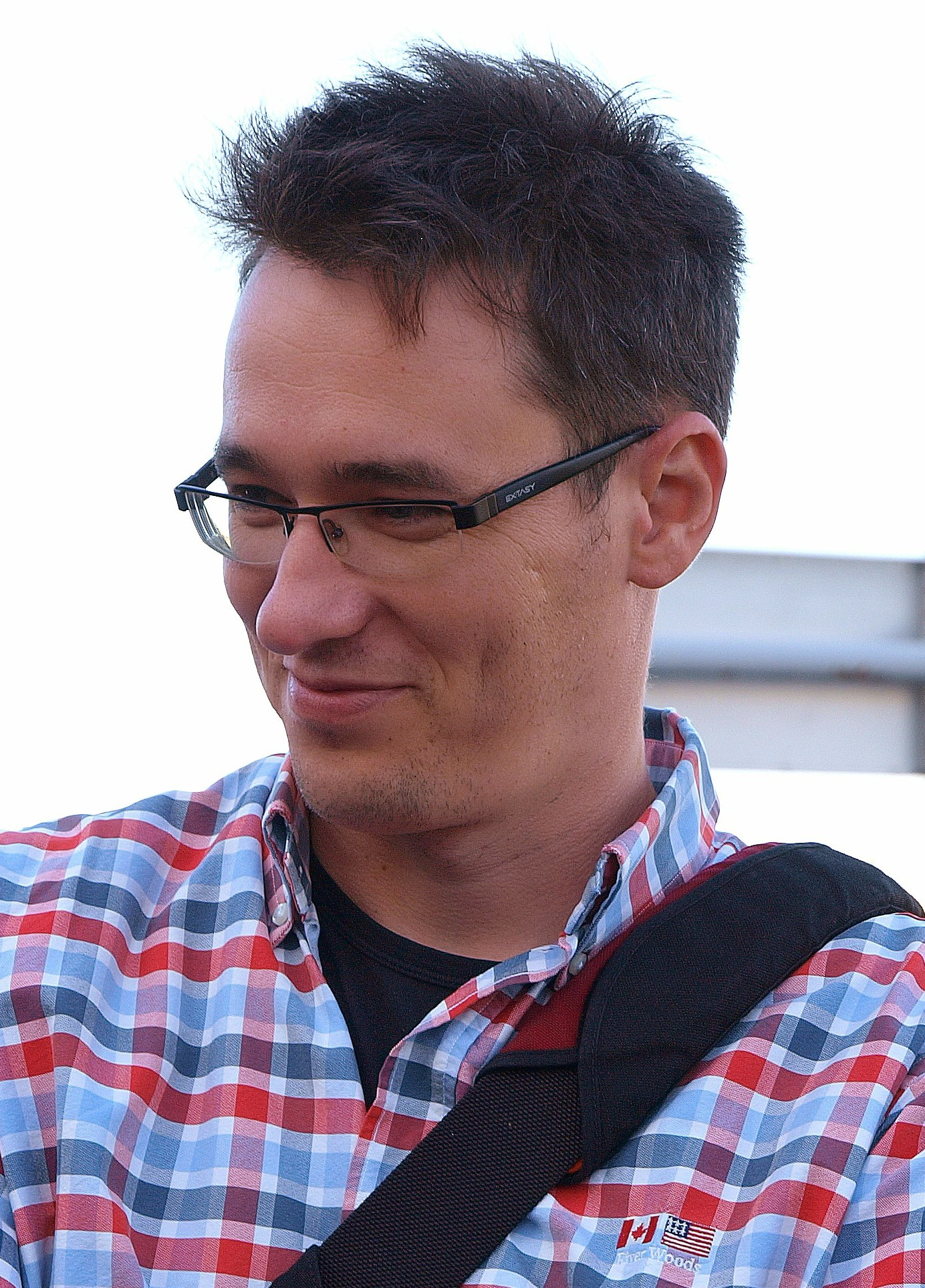

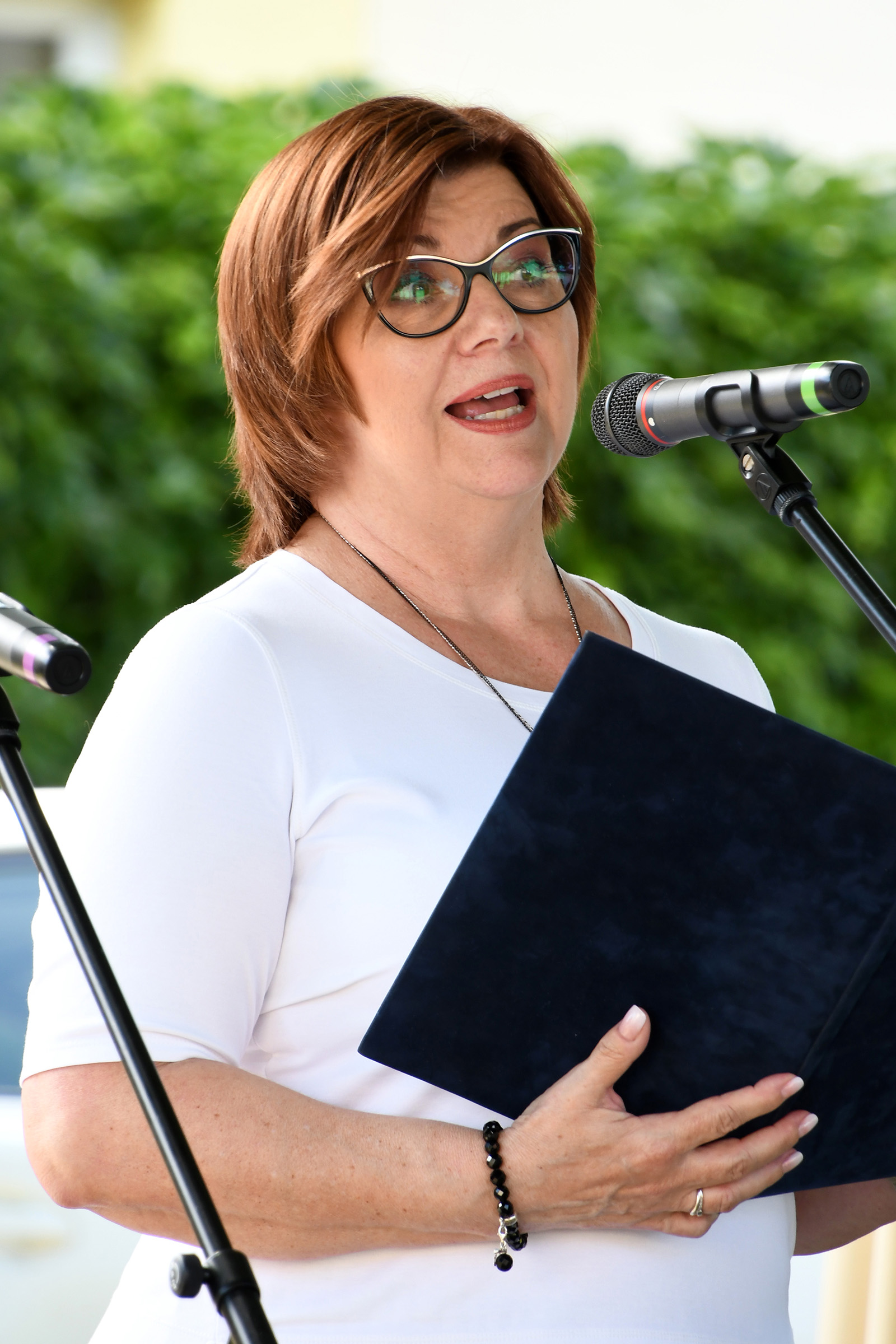

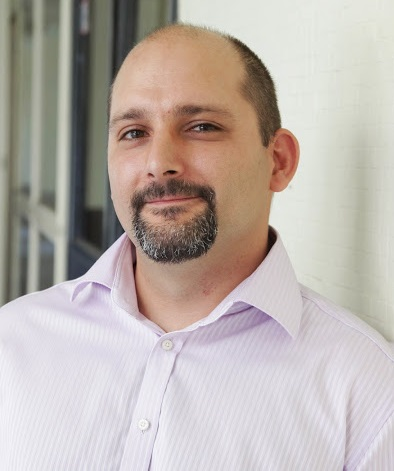
	First party	Second party	Third party
Leader	István Tarlós	Csaba Horváth	Gergely Karácsony (Note: After the withdrawal of Ferenc Falus (hu))
Party	Fidesz–KDNP	MSZP	Együtt–PM
Last election	17 seats	10 seats	New party
Seats won	20	6 (Note: Including a joint candidate with other parties, Ákos Szabados (hu))	2
Seat change	▲3	▼4	▲2
Popular vote	277,873	118,693	56,506
	Fourth party	Fifth party	Sixth party
Leader	Erzsébet Gy. Németh	Marcell Tokody	Antal Csárdi
Party	DK	Jobbik	LMP
Last election	New party	3	3
Seats won	2	1	1
Seat change	▲2	▼2	▼2
Popular vote	49,918	40,590	32,059
- Map showing district mayoral election winners by party colors. White stands for a winning independent candidate.

The 2014 Budapest Assembly election was held on 12 October 2014, concurring with other local elections in Hungary. Voters elected the Mayor of Budapest, and the mayors of the 23 districts directly, while 9 seats in the assembly were distributed proportionally, taking into account votes cast for losing district mayoral candidates. This was the first election held under these rules, previously all seats (except for the Mayor) were elected with a party-list method.

== Background ==
Regarding the Budapest Assembly election, the Fidesz-dominated National Assembly amended the electoral law in June 2014 after an announcement by Fidesz politicians Lajos Kósa and Antal Rogán, half a year before the local elections took place. The amendment, according to analysts, was formed according to the current interests of the ruling party, since it forced cooperation between rival opposition parties (MSZP, DK and Together–PM) in order to win district mayoral positions (and thus Budapest Assembly seats). Only parties with at least 12 mayoral candidates could submit a compensation list. According to the Political Capital analysis think tank, this meant that the three largest opposition parties would have had to give up 7 districts, where all three of them run their own underdog candidate against the plausible Fidesz winner, while in the remaining 16 districts they cooperate and distribute among themselves in a ratio of 5–5–6. The Political Capital and the opposition parties criticized the Fidesz government, for amending the electoral law according to the current political situation months before the election, thereby reducing legal certainty and violating the ruling party's own adopted Constitution.

The final result of the election (see below) finally justified the criticism. Index.hu calculated that under the old electoral system (party-list proportional rules) the Fidesz would have had only 16 mandates (15 + the mayor) instead of the 20 it won, therefore, the government party majority would not have been behind Mayor István Tarlós that way in the 33-member General Assembly of Budapest.

== Mayor ==
Incumbent Mayor István Tarlós was reelected with 49.06% of the votes.

== District mayors ==
District	Elected mayor	Party	Number of votes for winner
I.	Gábor Tamás Nagy	Fidesz–KDNP	5 914
II.	Zsolt Láng	Fidesz–KDNP	18 733
III.	Balázs Bús	Fidesz–KDNP	23 615
IV.	Zsolt Wintermantel	Fidesz–KDNP	18 276
V.	Péter Szentgyörgyvölgyi	Fidesz–KDNP	5 621
VI.	Zsófia Hassay	Fidesz–KDNP	5 686
VII.	Zsolt Vattamány	Fidesz–KDNP	7 089
VIII.	Máté Kocsis	Fidesz–KDNP	10 674
IX.	János Bácskai	Fidesz–KDNP	7 954
X.	Róbert Kovács	Fidesz–KDNP	10 585
XI.	Tamás Hoffmann	Fidesz–KDNP	25 777
XII.	Zoltán Pokorni	Fidesz–KDNP	13 893
XIII.	József Tóth	MSZP	28 140
XIV.	Gergely Karácsony	Együtt–PM	18 126
XV.	László Hajdu	DK	11 294
XVI.	Péter Kovács	Fidesz–KDNP	16 064
XVII.	Levente Riz	Fidesz–KDNP	18 887
XVIII.	Attila Ughy	Fidesz–KDNP	15 202
XIX.	Péter Gajda	MSZP	13 858
XX.	Ákos Szabados	MSZP–DK–Együtt–PM	10 564
XXI.	Lénárd Borbély	Fidesz–KDNP	12 158
XXII.	Ferenc Karsay	Fidesz–KDNP	8 964
XXIII.	Ferenc Geiger	Independent	3 061

== Distribution of compensation seats ==
Compensation seats were distributed using the D'Hondt method.

Party	Votes for losing candidates	Additional seats
MSZP	66 131	3
Fidesz–KDNP	52 781	2
Jobbik	40 590	1
DK	38 624	1
Együtt–PM	38 380	1
LMP	32 059	1
