= Hungarian local elections =

Hungarian local elections are elections to Hungarian local government bodies.

The elections are held to elect a municipal representative body (municipal council) and a mayor for each of Hungarian self-governing localities. According to the Fundamental Law of Hungary (effective 1 January 2012), municipal and mayoral elections take place every five years.

== Voter and candidate eligibility ==
The right to vote is given to both Hungarian citizens and non-citizens who have a registered place of residence in the country and who are at least 18 years old.

== Selected list of Hungarian local elections ==
- 1994
  - 1994 Budapest mayoral election
- 1998
  - 1998 Budapest mayoral election
  - 1998 Budapest Assembly election
- 2002
  - 2002 Budapest mayoral election
  - 2002 Budapest Assembly election
- 2006 Hungarian local elections
  - 2006 Budapest mayoral election
  - 2006 Budapest Assembly election
- 2010 Hungarian local elections
  - 2010 Budapest mayoral election
  - 2010 Budapest Assembly election
  - 2010 Hajdúsámson municipal election
- 2014 Hungarian local elections
  - 2014 Budapest mayoral election
  - 2014 Budapest Assembly election
- 2019 Hungarian local elections
  - 2019 Budapest mayoral election
  - 2019 Budapest Assembly election
- 2024 Hungarian local elections
  - 2024 Budapest mayoral election
  - 2024 Budapest Assembly election

== See also ==
- Elections in Hungary
