= 2006 Budapest Assembly election =

← 2002	1 Oct 2006	2010 →

All 66 seats in the General Assembly of Budapest 34 seats needed for a majority
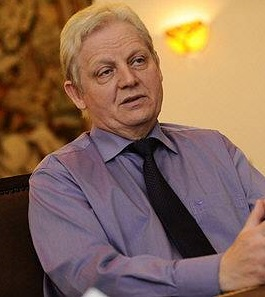

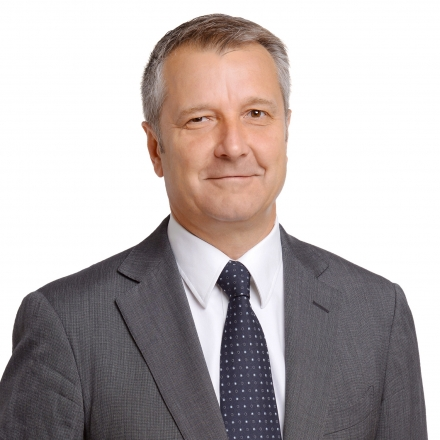

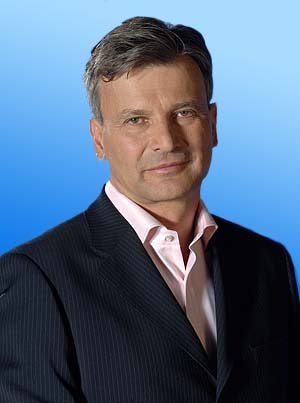

	First party	Second party
Leader	István Tarlós	Gyula Molnár
Party	Fidesz–KDNP	MSZP
Last election	21 seats (Note: In alliance with MDF)	24 seats
Seats won	30	24
Seat change	▲9	Steady
Popular vote	331,830	267,759
Percentage	42.86%	34.58%
	Third party	Fourth party
Leader	Gábor Demszky	Kálmán Katona
Party	SZDSZ	MDF
Last election	16	in alliance with Fidesz
Seats won	9	3
Seat change	▼7	▲3
Popular vote	99,722	35,332
Percentage	12.88%	4.56%

The 2006 Budapest Assembly election was held on 1 October 2006, concurring with other local elections in Hungary.

== Mayor ==
Incumbent Gábor Demszky was directly elected mayor with 46.86% of the vote against Fidesz–KDNP supported independent candidate István Tarlós.

== Results ==
List seats were distributed using the D'Hondt method.

Budapest Assembly election, 2006
List	Candidates	Votes	%	±%	Seats	±
Fidesz–KDNP	István Tarlós; János Fónagy; Zoltán Pokorni; Zsolt Wintermantel; Gábor Bagdy...	331 830	42.86%	▲11.61%	30	▲9
MSZP	Gyula Molnár; Erzsébet Gy. Németh; Csaba Horváth; Pál Steiner; György Hunvald...	267 759	34.58%	▼1.00%	24	Steady
SZDSZ	Gábor Demszky; László Rajk; Imre Ikvai-Szabó; András Bőhm; Iván Bojár...	99 722	12.88%	▼10.29%	9	▼7
MDF	Kálmán Katona; Zoltán Hock; László Vaskor; Dóra Székelyné Gyökössy; Zoltán Lévai...	35 332	4.56%	N/A	3	N/A
MIÉP	László Zsinka; István Pál Szabó; György Dancsecs; Péter Pál Marsi; Károly Teszársz...	19 461	2.51%	▼4.05%	0	▼5
