= 2002 Budapest Assembly election =

← 1998	20 Oct 2002	2006 →

All 66 seats in the General Assembly of Budapest 34 seats needed for a majority
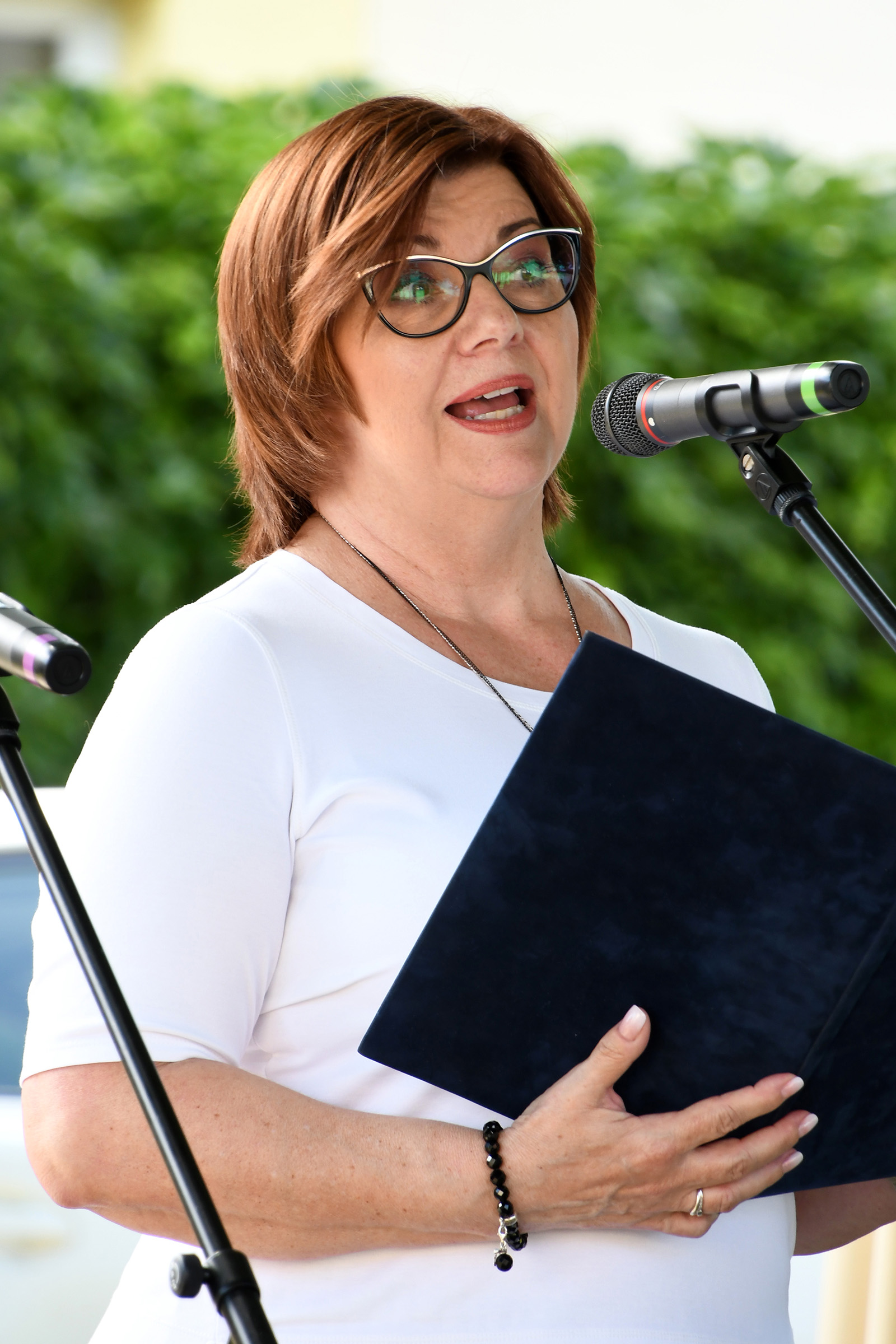

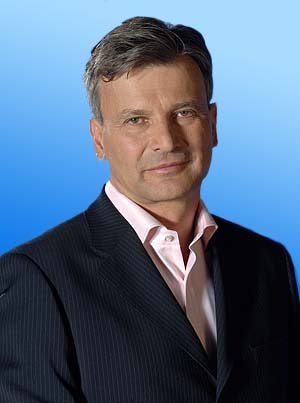

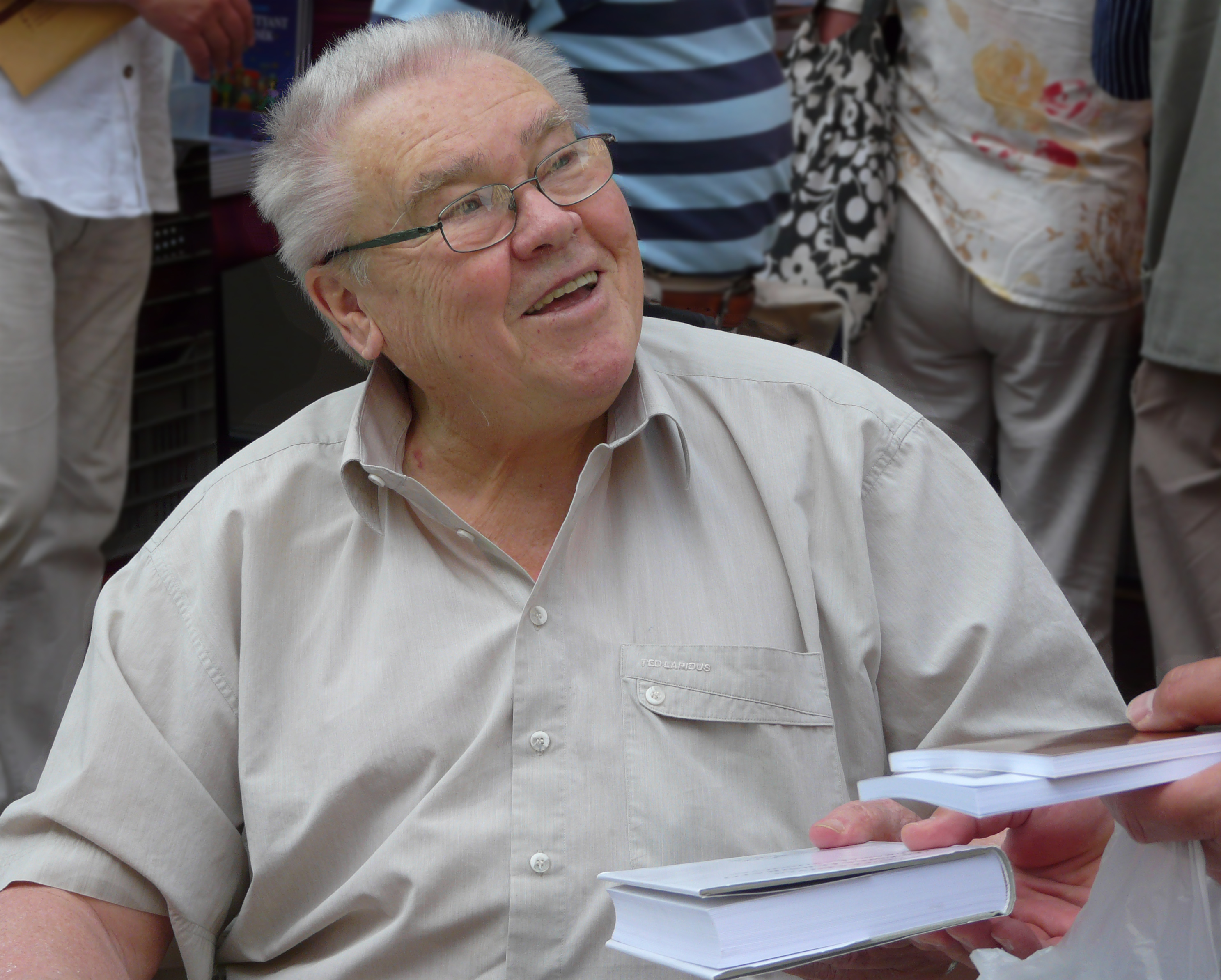
	First party	Second party
Leader	Erzsébet Gy. Németh	Kálmán Katona
Party	MSZP	Fidesz-MDF
Last election	20 seats	22 seats
Seats won	24	21
Seat change	▲4	▼1
Popular vote	262,998	230,992
Percentage	35.58%	31.25%
	Third party	Fourth party
Leader	Gábor Demszky	István Csurka
Party	SZDSZ	MIÉP
Last election	18 seats	6 seats
Seats won	16	5
Seat change	▼2	▼1
Popular vote	171,244	48,514
Percentage	23.17%	6.56%

The 2002 Budapest Assembly election was held on 20 October 2002, concurring with other local elections in Hungary.

== Mayor ==
Incumbent Gábor Demszky was directly elected mayor in a three-way race against Fidesz–KDNP supported independent candidate Pál Schmitt and MSZP candidate Erzsébet Gy. Németh with 46.70% of the vote.

== Results ==
List seats were distributed using the D'Hondt method.

Budapest Assembly election, 2002
Party	Candidates	Vote	Percentage	Vote change	Seats	Seat change
Hungarian Socialist Party	Erzsébet Gy. Németh; Tibor Bakonyi; Zoltán Ajkay; Pál Vajda; János Schiffer...	262 998	35.58%	▲8.08%	24	▲4
Fidesz-Hungarian Democratic Forum	Kálmán Katona; Tamás Deutsch; László Szőke; András Deák; Zsolt Wintermantel...	230 992	31.25%	▼0.26%	21	▼1
Alliance of Free Democrats	Gábor Demszky; András Bőhm; János Atkári; László Rajk; István Molnár...	171 244	23.17%	▼2.02%	16	▼2
Hungarian Justice and Life Party	István Csurka; László Zsinka; Zoltán Balczó; Zoltán Fenyvessy; Péter Pál Marsi...	48 514	6.56%	▼2.56%	5	▼1
