= Bethlen Square Synagogue =

Synagogue and former school for the deaf in Budapest, Hungary

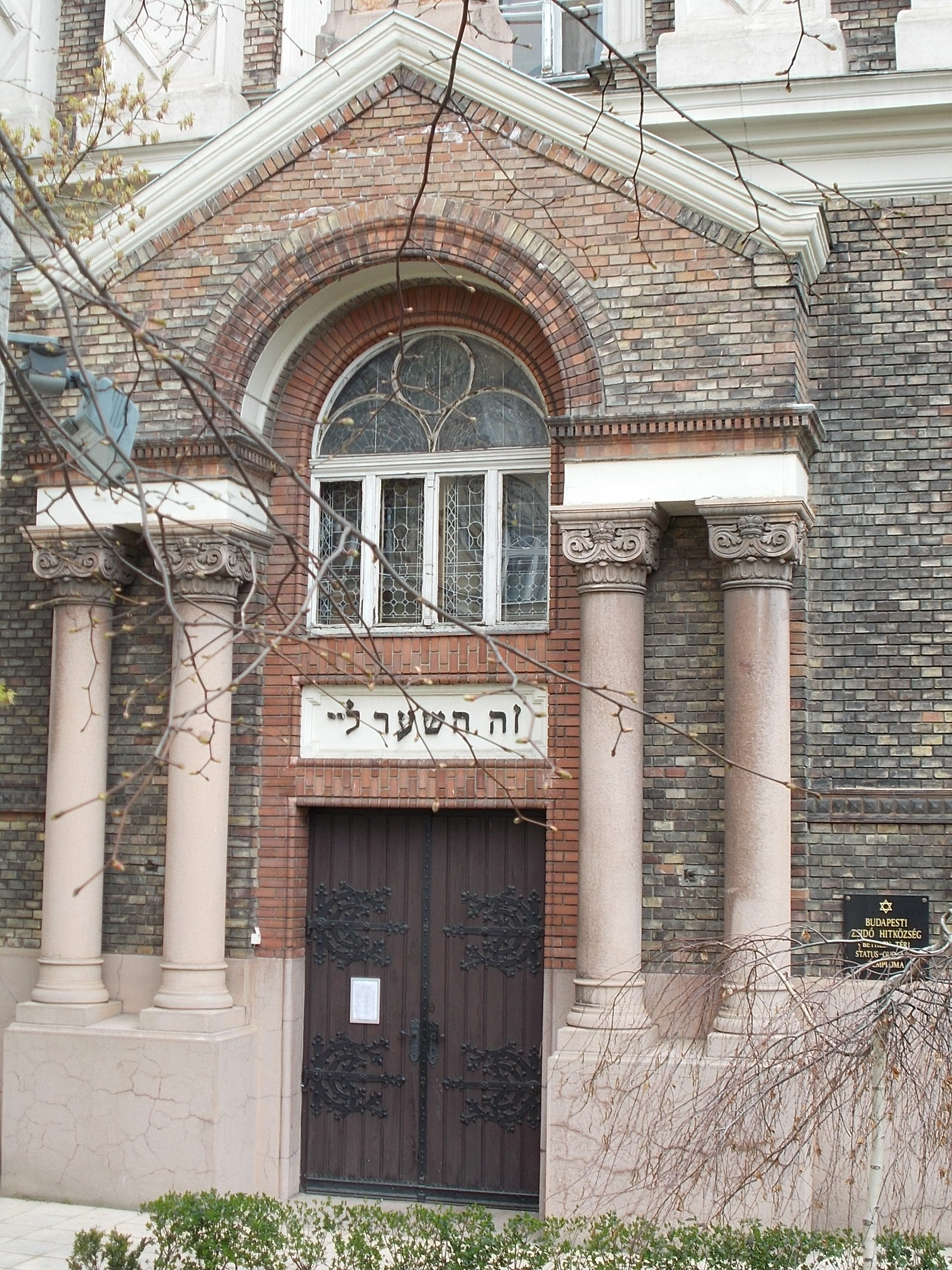
- The synagogue in 2016

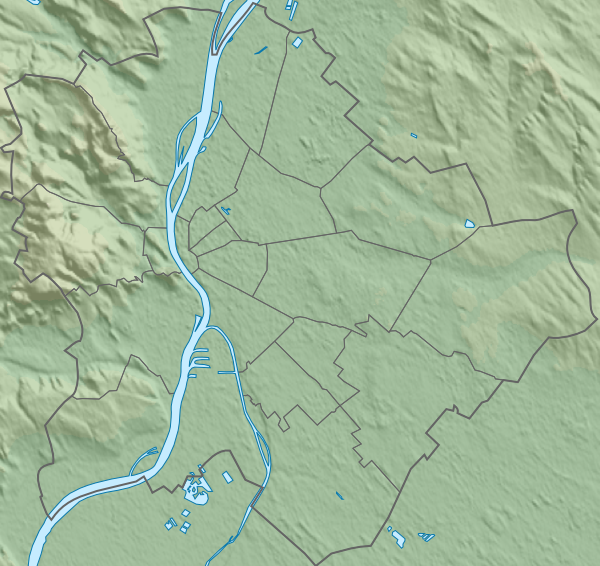
- Location of the synagogue in Budapest

Religion
- Affiliation: Judaism
- Rite: Nusach Ashkenaz
- Ecclesiastical or organizational status: Synagogue
- Status: Active

Location
- Location: 2 Bethlen Gábor Square, VII district, Budapest
- Country: Hungary
- Interactive map of Bethlen Square Synagogue
- Coordinates: 47°30′14″N 19°04′48″E

Architecture
- Architects: Lipót Baumhorn; Gyórgyi Somogyi
- Type: Synagogue architecture
- Style: Hungarian Secession
- Completed: 1876 (as a deaf institute)
- Materials: Brick

The Bethlen Square Synagogue is a Jewish congregation and synagogue, that is located at 2 Bethlen Gábor Square, in the VII district of Budapest, Hungary.

The synagogue is located inside the former Jewish Institute for the Deaf, Budapest (Hungarian: Izraelita Siketnémák Budapesti Országos Intézete) building, that is now part of the Budapest campus of McDaniel College, a U.S. liberal arts college.

== History ==
The institute building was completed in 1876. In 1944, the institute closed as a result of World War II. The institute's building has long since become a synagogue and center of Jewish community.

Izrael Zachariah Deutsch was a student at the institute, from around the time of the Holocaust. Dezső Kanizsai was a teacher at the institute, from 1907.

== See also ==
- History of the Jews in Hungary
- List of synagogues in Hungary
