= Gozsdu-udvar =

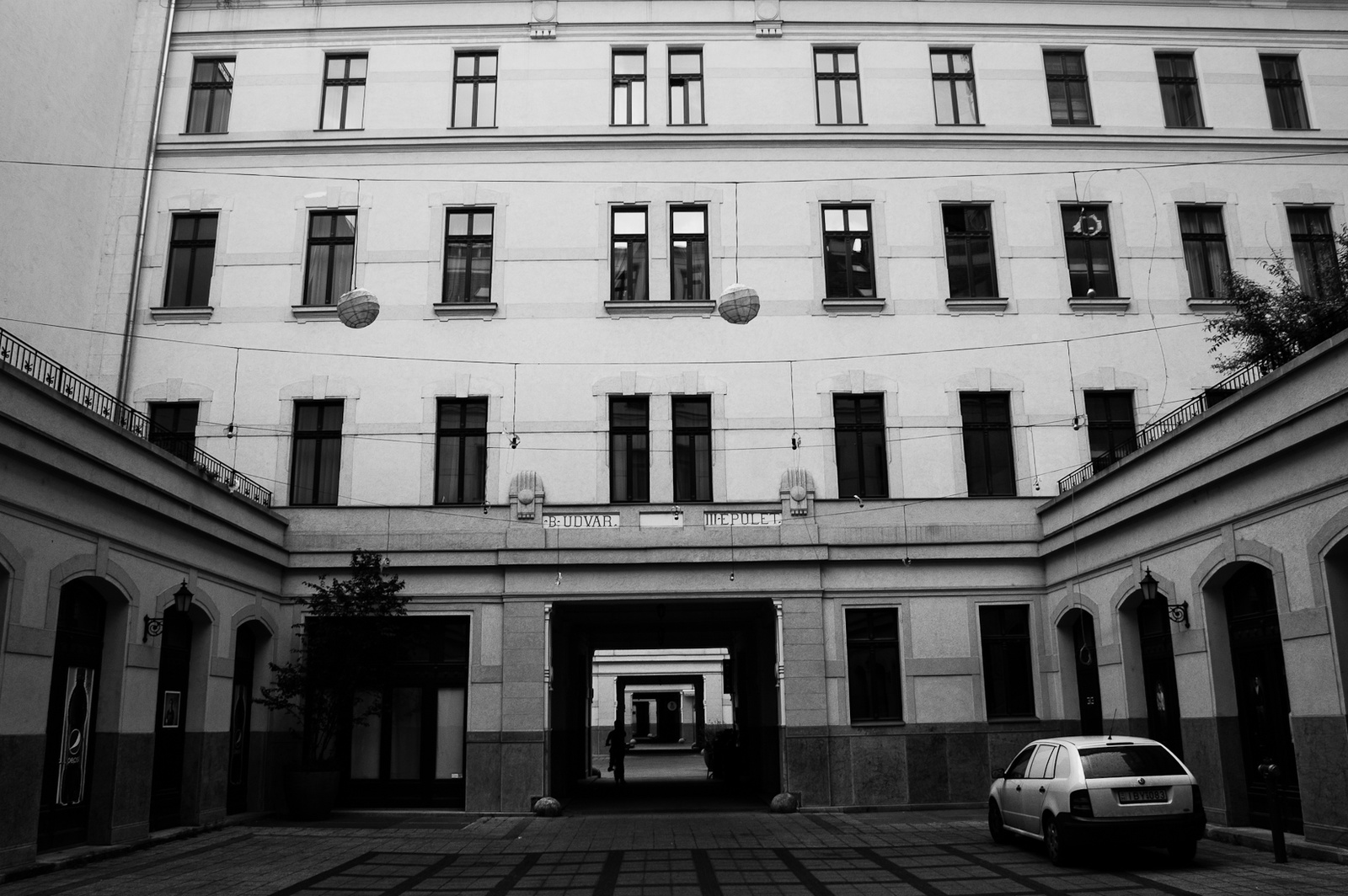

- Location within Budapest

General information
- Location: Király utca 13., Dob utca 16., 7th district, Budapest, Hungary
- Coordinates: 47°29′57.64″N 19°3′31.3″E
- Construction started: 1900
- Construction stopped: 1901
- Renovated: 2002-2008
- Owner: private

Technical details
- Floor count: 4
- Grounds: ~60,000 sq m

Design and construction
- Architect: Győző Czigler
- Known for: cafés, bars, restaurants, galleries

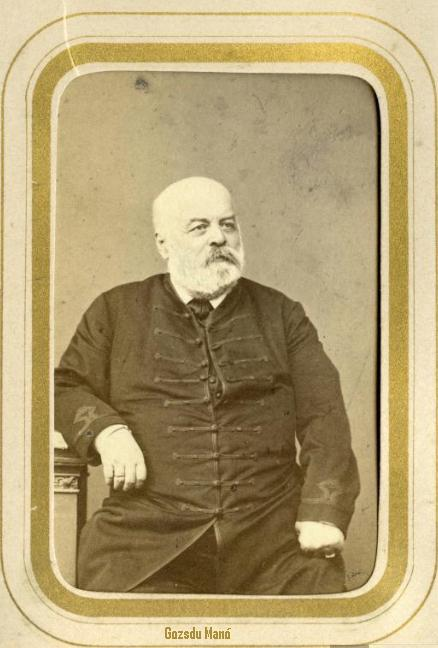
Emanoil Gojdu in 1865

Gozsdu-udvar (English: Gozsdu Courtyard) comprises seven buildings and their courtyards in the 7th district of Budapest, and can be approached from Király Street, Dob Street and Holló Street. The building complex was built in 1901 by the Gozsdu Foundation according to the testament of the Romanian lawyer, Emanoil Gojdu (Hungarian: Gozsdu Emánuel).

Gozsdu-udvar is close to Deák Ferenc Square and Andrássy Avenue. The neighbourhood is a UNESCO World Heritage Site.

== History ==
The complex was designed by architect professor Győző Czigler and built by the Gozsdu Foundation in 1900–1901.

All the 7 original buildings were part of the Jewish Ghetto that existed from November 1944 to January 1945. In 1952 the buildings and courtyards became into state ownership, which was then approved by a Romanian-Hungarian interstate agreement in 1953.

In 1999 Gozsdu-udvar was privatized to Autoker Ltd. Reconstruction works were made between 2002 and 2008. Today it is well known of cafés, bars, pubs, galleries, exclusive shops.

== See also ==
- 7th District of Budapest
