= 2010 Hajdúsámson municipal election =

Local election in Hungary

Municipal elections were held in Hajdúsámson, Hajdú-Bihar County in Hungary in 2010.

== Results ==
=== Mayor ===
Candidate	Party	Votes	%
Gabor Hamza	Democratic Confederation of Free Trade Unions		80.47
János Piroska	Fidesz	354	13.75
Imre Sorosi	Democratic Confederation of Free Trade Unions	149	5.79
Total			100

=== Council ===
The elected members were:

- Péterné Ács
- Zoltán Bacskai
- Róbert Farkas
- Csaba Fekete
- István Zoltán Fekete
- Jánosné Józan
- Zoltán Sándor Kerekes
- Ferenc Papp
- Gábor Sólyom
- József Cseke
- István Hermann
- János Magyar Pistai
- Zoltán Tar
