= Várkerület =

1st District of Budapest

1st District of Budapest Budapest I. kerülete Várkerület, Budavár
- District of Budapest
- District I
- Flag Coat of arms

- Location of District I in Budapest (shown in grey)
- Coordinates: 47°29′51″N 19°02′17″E
- Country: Hungary
- Region: Central Hungary
- City: Budapest
- Established: 17 November 1873
- Quarters: List: Gellérthegy; Krisztinaváros; Tabán; Vár; Víziváros

Government
  - Mayor: László Böröcz (Fidesz)

Area
  - Total: 3.41 km^{2} (1.32 sq mi)
  - Rank: 20th

Population (2016)
  - Total: 25,196
  - Rank: 22nd
  - Density: 7,390/km^{2} (19,100/sq mi)
- Demonym: első kerületi ("1st districter")
- Time zone: UTC+1 (CET)
  - Summer (DST): UTC+2 (CEST)
- Postal code: 1011 ... 1016
- Website: www.budavar.hu

The 1st District of Budapest is the Castle District (Hungarian: Várkerület or Budavár) and is the historical part of the Buda side of Budapest. It consists of the Buda Castle Hill and some other neighborhoods around it, such as Tabán, Krisztinaváros and parts of Gellért Hill.

== Location ==
The Castle District is situated on the banks of the Danube, in the Buda side.

Neighbour districts of District I are (south to north):

- District XI: Újbuda ("New Buda"), which is most known of the universities and student life
- District XII: Hegyvidék ("Highlands")
- District II

== Landmarks ==
- Buda Castle
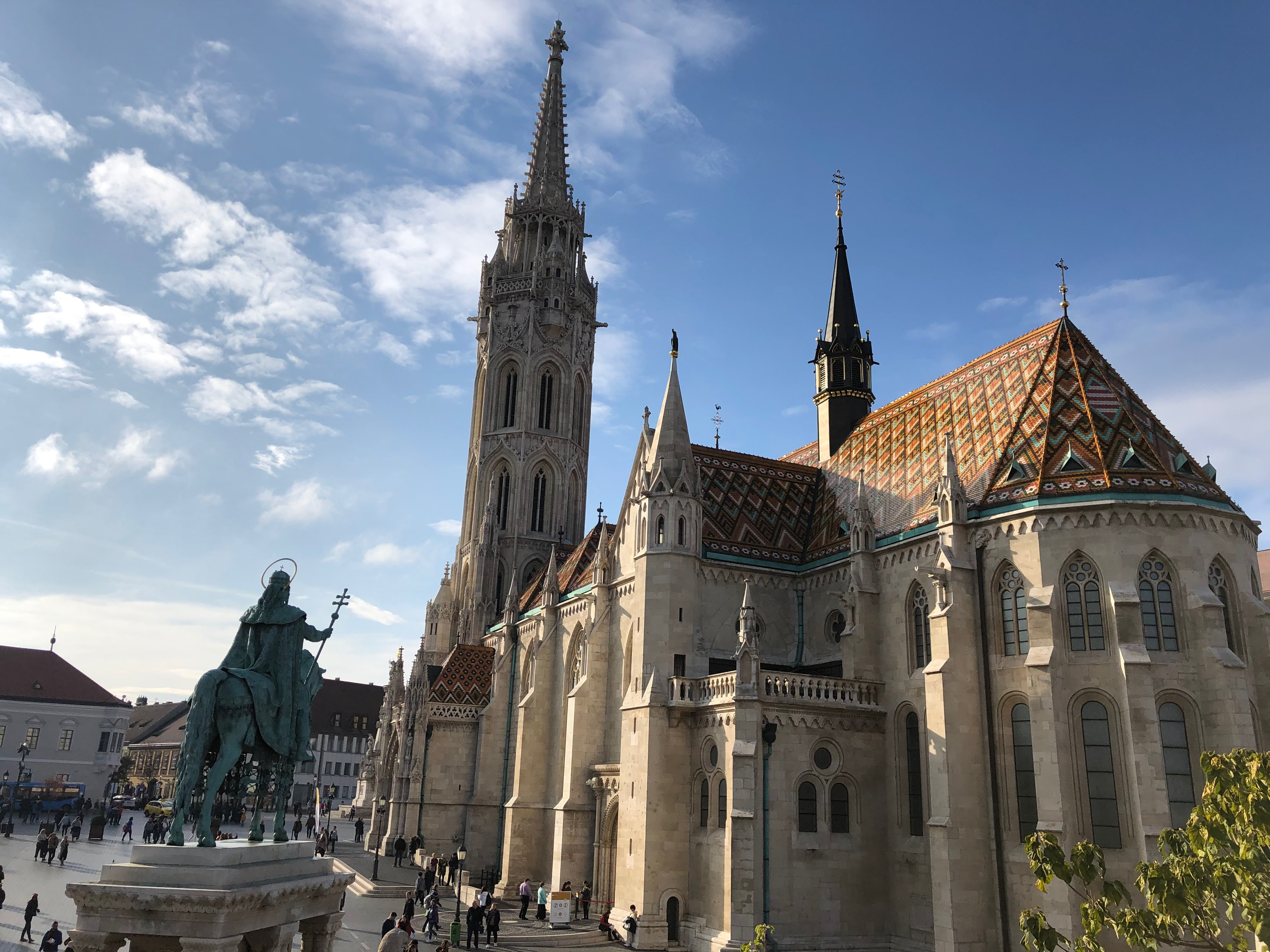
- Matthias Church
  Matthias Church
- Hungarian National Gallery
- Castle Hill Funicular
- Sándor Palace
- Fisherman's Bastion
- Labyrinth of Buda Castle
- Gellért Hill

== Politics ==
The current mayor of I. District of Budapest is Márta V. Naszályi (Dialogue).

The District Assembly, elected at the 2019 local government elections, is made up of 15 members (1 Mayor, 10 Individual constituencies MEPs and 4 Compensation List MEPs) divided into this political parties and alliances:

Party	Seats	Current District Assembly
Opposition coalition (Note: Coalition of Momentum–DK–MSZP–Dialogue–LMP-Our Castle.)	10	M
Fidesz-KDNP	5	

=== List of mayors ===
Member	Party	Date
Imre Ligeti	MDF	1990–1994
Tamás Katona	MDF (Note: He joined MDNP on 4 March 1996)	1994–1998
Gábor Tamás Nagy	Fidesz	1998–2019
Márta V. Naszályi	PM	2019–2024
László Böröcz	Fidesz	2024-

== Twin towns – sister cities ==
Várkerület is twinned with:

- Capestrano, Italy
- Carouge, Switzerland
- Innere Stadt (Vienna), Austria
- Lendava, Slovenia
- Marlow, England, United Kingdom
- Mukachevo, Ukraine
- Odorheiu Secuiesc, Romania
- Old Town (Bratislava), Slovakia
- Prague 1 (Prague), Czech Republic
- Regensburg, Germany
- Savonlinna, Finland
- Senta, Serbia
- Śródmieście (Warsaw), Poland
