= László Böröcz =

Hungarian politician (born 1983)

László Böröcz (born in Szombathely, Hungary on 11 November 1983) is a Hungarian politician. He was a member of the National Assembly of Hungary (Országgyűlés). He has also served as the chairman of Fidelitas (Hungary) between 2015 and 2019. He was elected member of parliament in 2018. He lost the 2022 parliamentary election to Antal Csárdi in the Budapest 1st constituency. In the 2024 Hungarian local elections, he was elected Mayor of Budavár (1st district of Budapest), defeating the incumbent Márta V. Naszályi (PM).

== See also ==
- List of members of the National Assembly of Hungary (2018–2022)
