= Dezső Kanizsai =

Hungarian audiologist and teacher of deaf children

Dr. Kanizsai with students. Budapest, World War II.

Dezső Kanizsai (27 January 1886 – 27 November 1981) was a Hungarian audiologist and educator of deaf children. Kanizsai was born in Cífer in 1886. He taught at the Jewish Institute for the Deaf in Budapest starting in 1907. During the interwar period he developed and publicized his own teaching program. His school on Mexico Square became a social club for the deaf Jews of Budapest.

After the German military occupation of Hungary in March 1944, Kaniszai managed to keep his class together until the end of the war. "Nearly all the survivors [among the deaf Hungarian Jews] had attended the Jewish school for deaf children on Mexico Square." After the war Kaniszai returned to academic and teaching duties and authored the definitive Hungarian-language textbooks on education for the deaf.

== World War II ==
The Jewish community of Budapest before the Holocaust was estimated at 200,000. Despite popular antisemitism the community was relatively safe and well-integrated politically and with the national economy. The Jewish School for the Deaf on Mexico Square was maintained by the community and managed by Dr. Kanizsai. On the eve of the German occupation it provided shelter and training to forty-five deaf and twelve blind children. It was a safe haven and a meeting point for the deaf Jews of Budapest, regardless of their age.

Memoirist Izrael Deutsch (Harry Dunai), who was admitted to the school in 1939 at the age of five, described Kaniszai of that period: "A tall man with a hefty, well-developed body and a few red streaks running through his pure white hair. He lived at school along with the children. He was Jewish as were most counselors and teachers." "He was easy to spot with his tall large frame, hazel eyes, red-streaked white hair and very fair skin. He always wore the same three-piece suit with a white striped shirt and a necktie... he could speak, read and write English and German and held a doctorate degree." According to Deutsch, Kaniszai was a strict, and at times a ruthless disciplinarian who "regularly [and publicly] spanked children when they defied him". Other teachers followed suit, beating and humiliating the children. Eventually, at the end of the war, Deutsch was so fed up with "Dr. Kanizsai treating me like his slave" and "using me as his workhorse" that he fled from the school. According to Deutsch, "he [Kanizsai] was a selfish man, always fulfilling his own needs whenever he could."

On 19 March 1944 the German troops occupied Hungary. With them came Adolf Eichmann, charged with the physical extermination of Hungarian Jews. The next day, 20 March, Eichmann's deputy Hermann Krumey convened a meeting of Jewish educators, including Kanizsai, and announced a shutdown of all Jewish schools. All children were to be herded into the former Orphanage for Boys building. According to the plans of the Final Solution, this was only a stopover before shipment to camps in the Hungarian countryside and ultimately to extermination camps.

Kanizsai objected but could not prevent the closure of his own school. He faced a difficult choice: either keep the children together in Budapest, or let them go to their parents. Kanizsai chose to disperse the elder classes, but keep together the junior pupils. The first decision was a mistake, because the Jews dispersed in the countryside were soon collected and sent to the camps. Kanizsai, however, succeeded in keeping together his class of disabled children until the end of the war. He and his wife followed the class during its first forced relocation, from the School for the Deaf to the Orphanage. Kaniszai worried that the blind, in particular, would not get along with other children, but this turned out to be the least of his problems. At the end of the spring of 1944, the old Orphanage building on Queen Wilma Street was destroyed by an Allied air raid. One of the deaf survivors of the raid, Leo Wachlenberg, could not hear a guard's order to stop and was then shot. Some others, like Deutsch, found refuge with surviving relatives, while others kept together until the end of the war. In the ten months between March 1944 and January 1945 the Germans and Hungarian Arrow Cross nationalists murdered more than half a million Jews, but the close-knit community of deaf teenagers persisted. Shortly before the Siege of Budapest they were forcibly relocated into the Budapest Ghetto, but were spared from further repressions.

Before the end of the war, the former building of the School for the Deaf was taken over by Raoul Wallenberg's mission of the International Red Cross and once again became the shelter for the Jews of Budapest. After the war Kanizsai returned to his profession and brought the surviving students back to his class with the support of the Red Cross and the Joint Distribution Committee. However, in 1947 he objected against the emigration of his students to Palestine. He initially agreed with the Joint and the local Zionists, but then refused to give his consent to emigration.

Kanizsai died in Budabest in 1981.
