= Népsziget =

Neighbourhood of Budapest, Hungary

Coordinates: 47°33′37″N 19°04′21″E

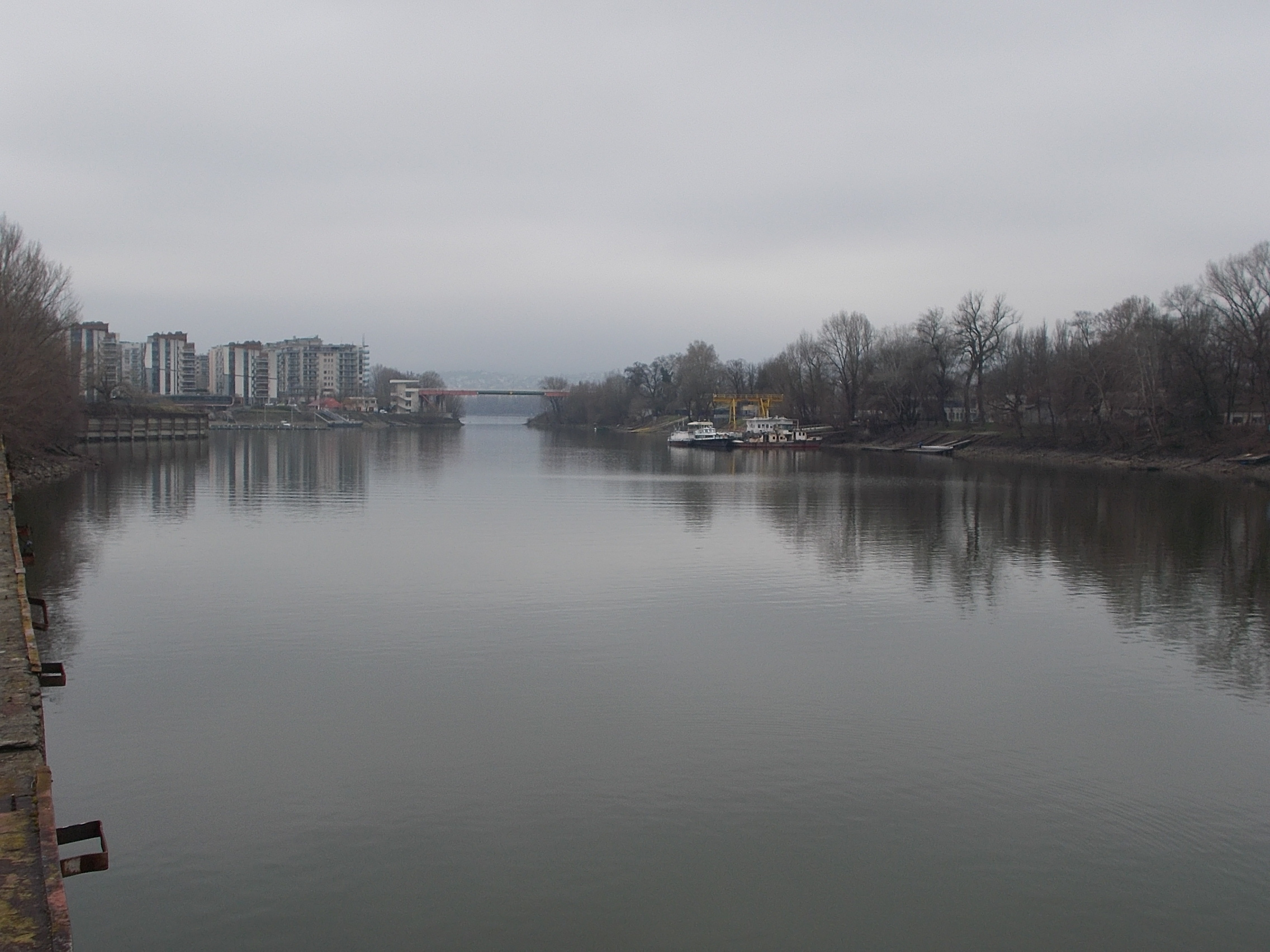
View of the entrance to Újpesti Bay, 2018

Népsziget is a neighborhood in Budapest, located in the IV and XIII districts. It is also known as Újpesti Island or Mosquito Island. The peninsula is approximately 2 km long and covers an area of 50 hectares. It is situated on the boundary between the districts, on the northern and southern sides of the Újpest railway bridge embankment. Originally, it was one of the Danube river's islands, but today it is a peninsula. It is bordered by the Danube on all sides except for Zsilip Street. It is located to the northeast of Hajógyári Island.

== History ==
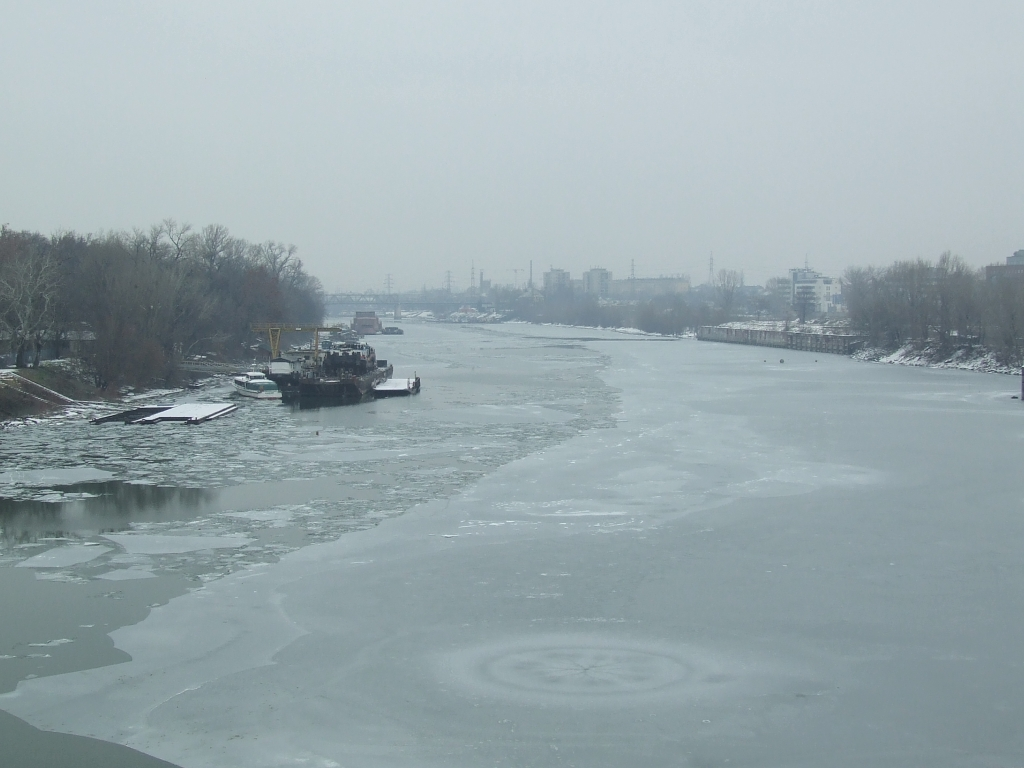
View of the winter harbor from the Meder Street pedestrian bridge

It was called Saban Island, according to the records of the border survey of Pest in September 1695. On 18th-19th century maps it is shown as Pesti Island, later Újpesti Island. Later it was colloquially known as Szúnyog-sziget (Mosquito Island) or Csigás-sziget (Snail Island). It was originally an island on the Danube on the border of Pest and Rákospalota, which was connected to Újpest by a thin isthmus between 1853 and 1863 via Újpest's Zsilip Street, and thus became a peninsula.

According to the boundaries of the time, the whole of Népsziget was part of Budapest and Palotai Island was part of Újpest. It is interesting to note that, since the old city boundary is still indicated in the text of the law as the boundary between the districts XIII and IV, the northern part of the island, although de facto part of the administrative district IV since the 1960s, would de jure belong to the district XIII.

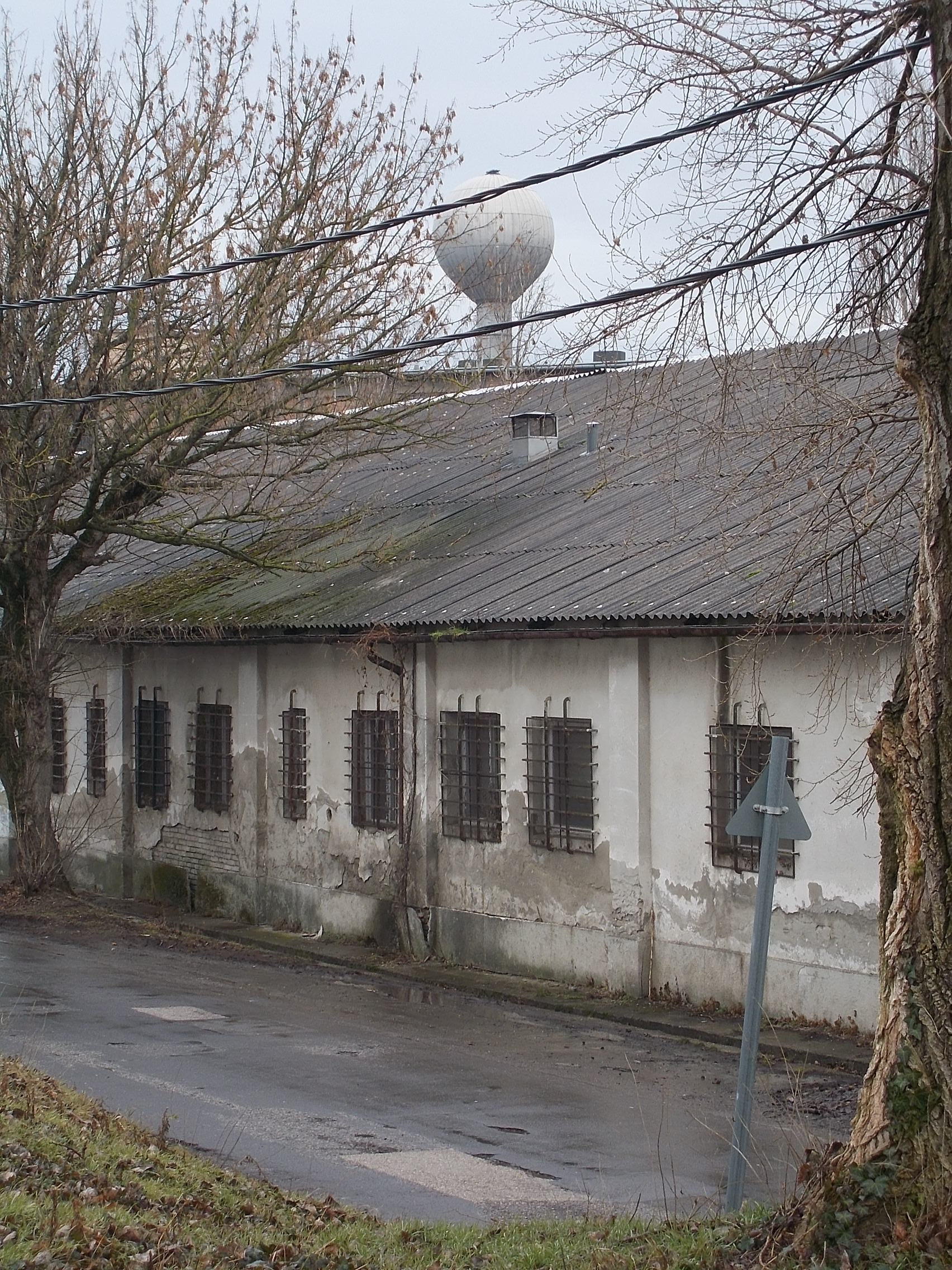
Zsilip Street

The Újpest railway bridge was built in 1896, providing an important link between the peninsula and the two banks of the Danube. Budapest's bid for the 1928 Summer Olympics envisaged the peninsula as an important central location for the Olympics.

In the bay, at the southern tip of the peninsula, there used to be a small boat ferry across to the peninsula (Rocsó) from Meder Street. This was closed by the 1980s, when the footbridge was built. The deteriorated bridge was renovated in 2017.

== Sources ==
Budapest Encyclopedia I–II. Ed. László Berza. 2nd, expanded edition. Budapest: Akadémiai. 1993. ISBN 963-05-6409-2
