= Sashalom =

Neighborhood in Budapest, Hungary

Coordinates: 47.5154°N 19.1699°E

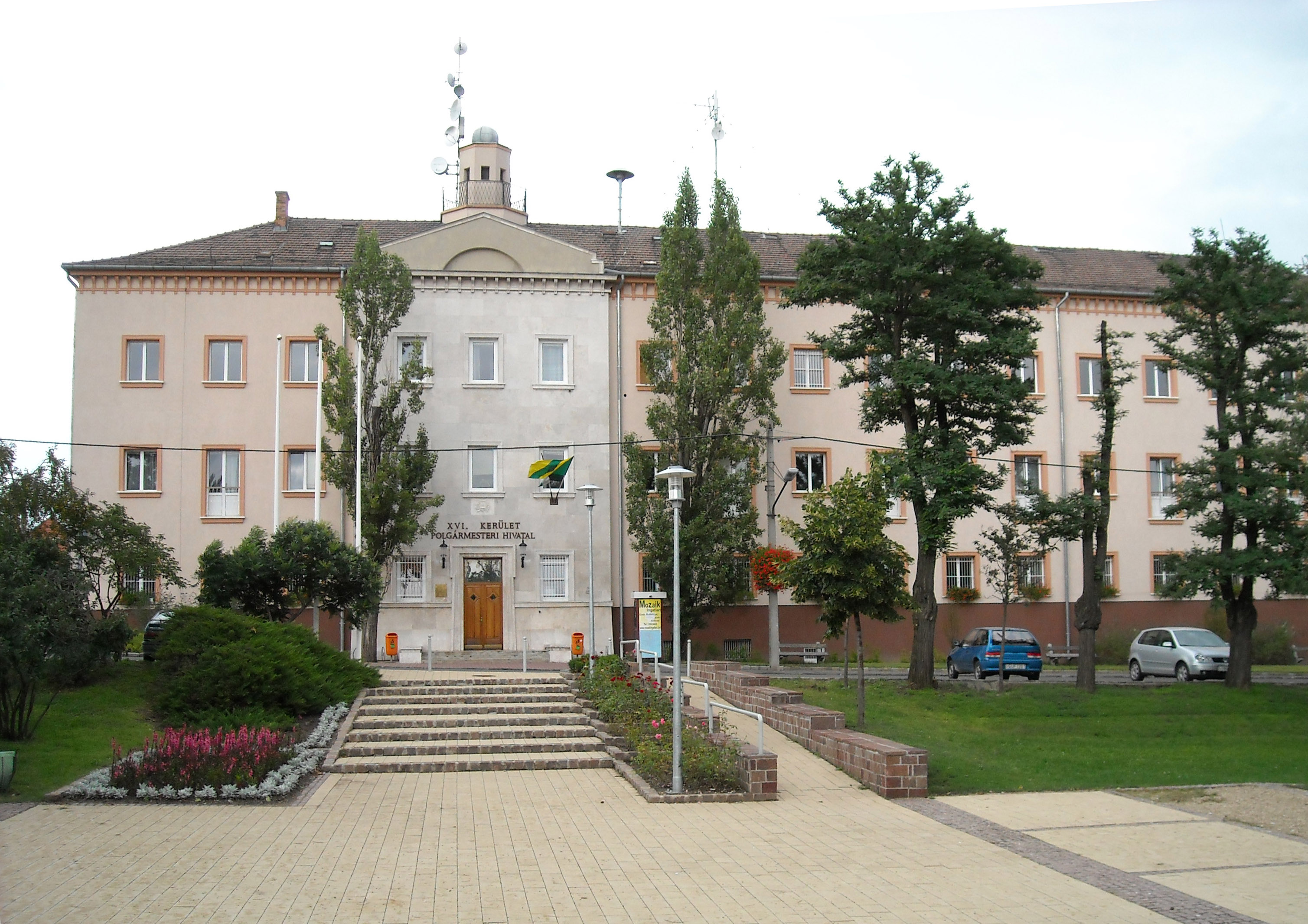
Municipal council of the 16th District

Sashalom (German: Adlerhügel) is a neighbourhood within the 16th District of Budapest. It is mostly a green and suburban environment away from traffic and businesses.

A monument was erected in Sashalom to commemorate the tens or hundreds of thousands of German people deported in January 1945 to the internment camps of the Soviet Union as slave labor. There had been a battle of Budapest in early January 1945, during which Russians took the neighborhood.

== Sport ==
The oldest football and athletics team based in Sashalom, though originally from the neighbouring village, is Rákosszentmihályi AFC. The THSE Sashalom, currently playing in the 2017–18 Nemzeti Bajnokság III, is based in the 16th district of Budapest.
