= Péter Niedermüller =

Hungarian politician

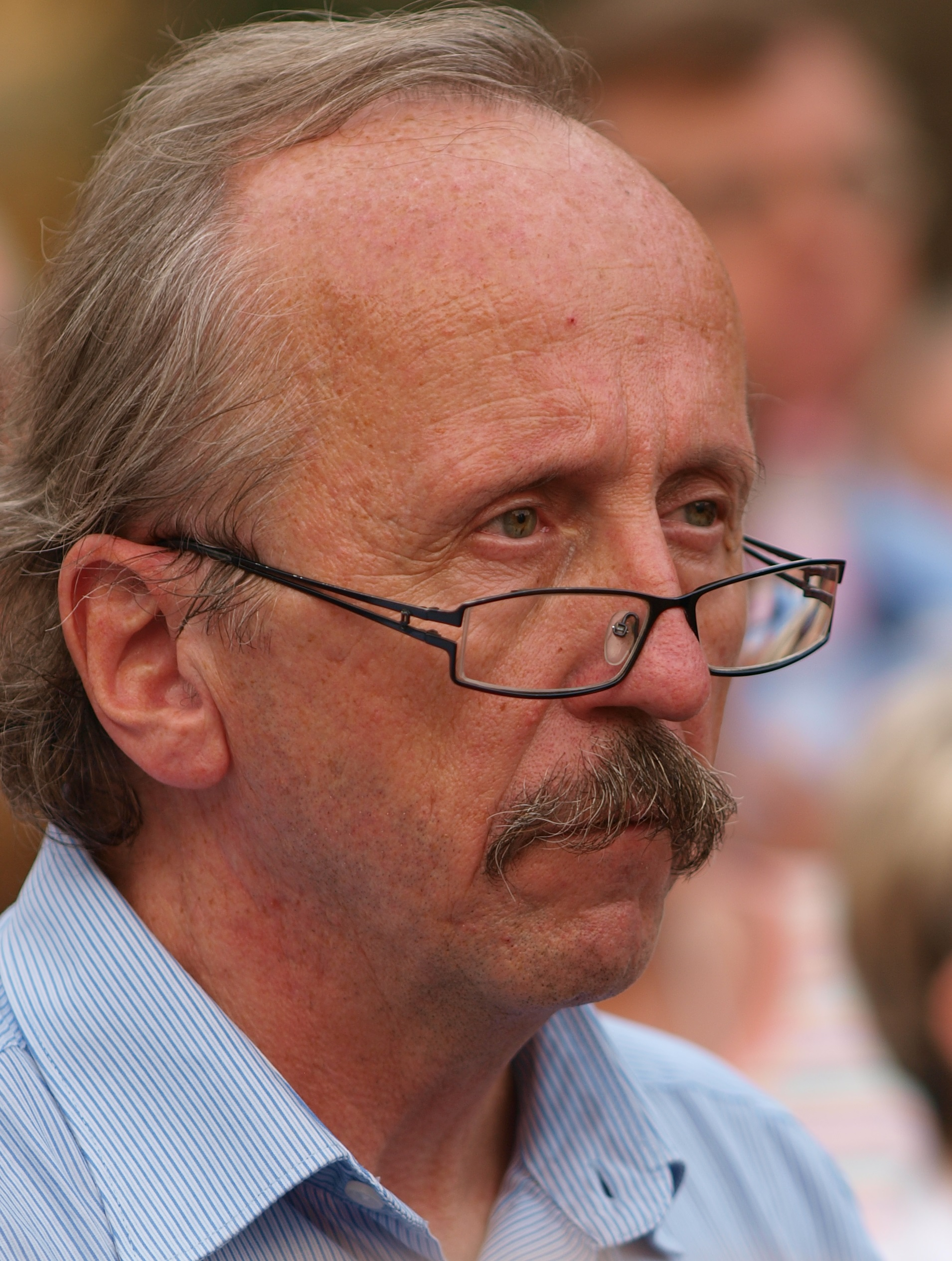
- Péter Niedermüller in 2012

Member of the European Parliament
- In office 1 July 2014 – 1 July 2019
- Constituency: Hungary

Mayor of Erzsébetváros District VII, Budapest
- Incumbent
- Assumed office 13 October 2019
- Preceded by: Zsolt Vattamány

Personal details
- Born: 3 September 1952 (age 73) Budapest, Hungarian People's Republic
- Party: Democratic Coalition
- Children: Niedermüller Gergely, Niedermüller Márton
- Occupation: Politician

Péter Niedermüller (born 3 September 1952) is a Hungarian politician. From July 2014 to July 2019, he served as a Member of the European Parliament, representing Hungary for the Democratic Coalition. In the 2019 Hungarian local elections, he was elected as the Mayor of Erzsébetváros as the joint candidate of the opposition (MSZP-P-DK-LMP-Momentum, with external support of Jobbik).

Niedermüller also served as the Treasurer of the Group of the Progressive Alliance of Socialists and Democrats in the European Parliament.

== Parliamentary service ==
- Member, Committee on Civil Liberties, Justice and Home Affairs (2014–2019)
- Member, Delegation for relations with Israel (2014–2019)
