= 1998 Budapest mayoral election =

← 1994	18 Oct 1998	2002 →
- Turnout: 43.69%
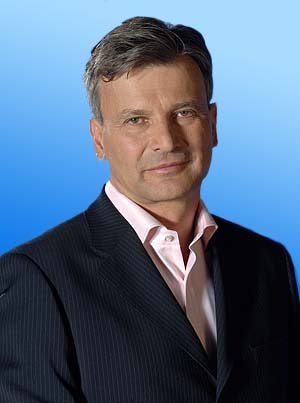

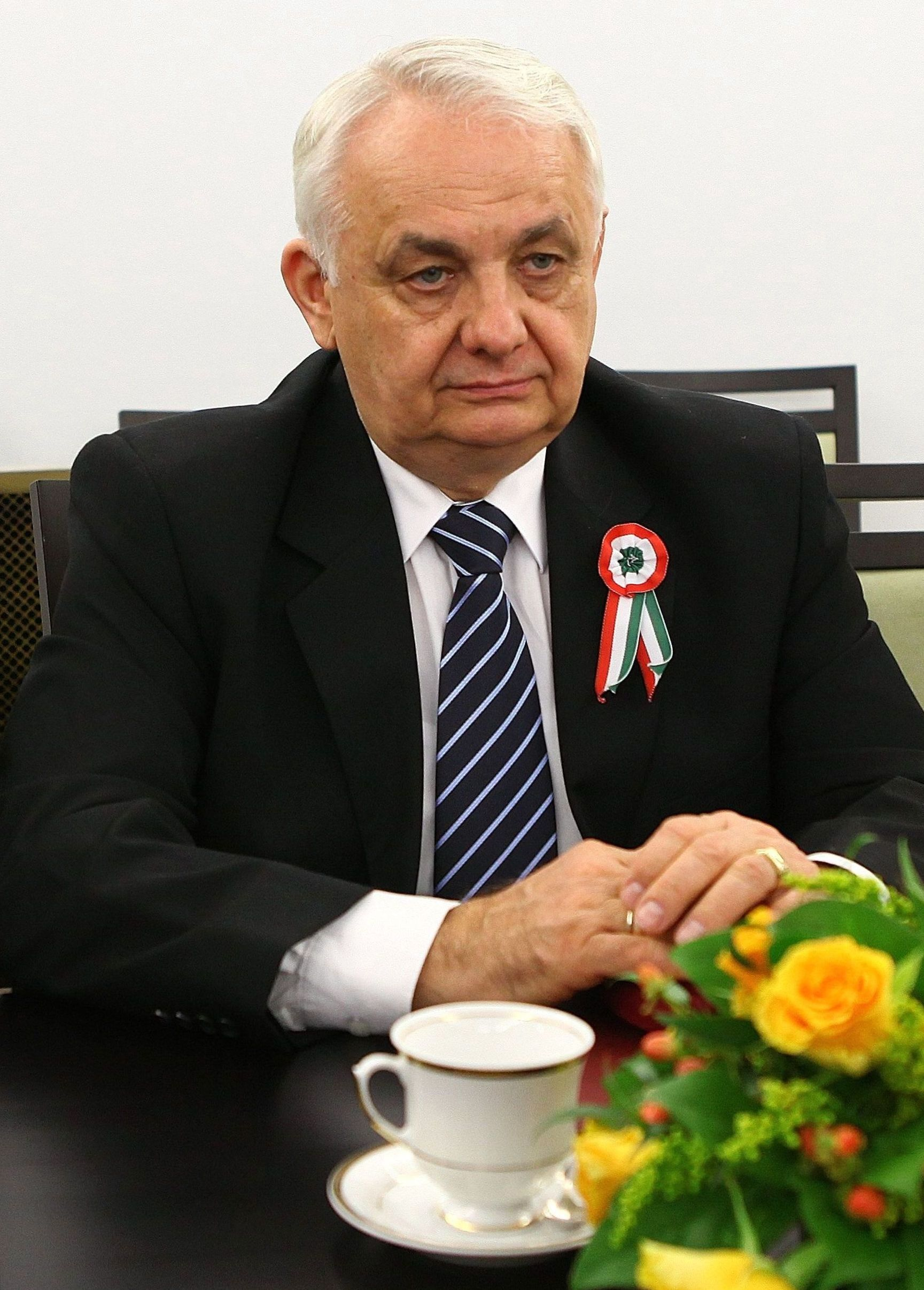
Candidate	Gábor Demszky	János Latorcai
Party	SZDSZ	Fidesz
Alliance		Fidesz-FKgP-MDF-MDNP
Vote	373 969	250 335
Percentage	58.22%	38.97%
Mayor before election
Gábor Demszky
SZDSZ
Elected Mayor
Gábor Demszky
SZDSZ

The 1998 Budapest mayoral election was held on 18 October 1998 to elect the Mayor of Budapest (főpolgármester). On the same day, local elections were held throughout Hungary, including the districts of Budapest. The election was run using a First-past-the-post voting system. The winner of this election served for 4 years.

The election was won by two-time incumbent, Gábor Demszky.

== Results ==
1998 Budapest mayoral election
Party	Candidate	Votes	%	±%
SZDSZ	Gábor Demszky	373 969	58.22%	+21.94%
Fidesz	János Latorcai	250 335	38.97%	+10.54%
Workers' Party	Pál Kollát	18 008	2.80%	+0.65%
Total votes		642 312	100.0%	
