= Tamás Katona =

Hungarian politician (1932–2013)

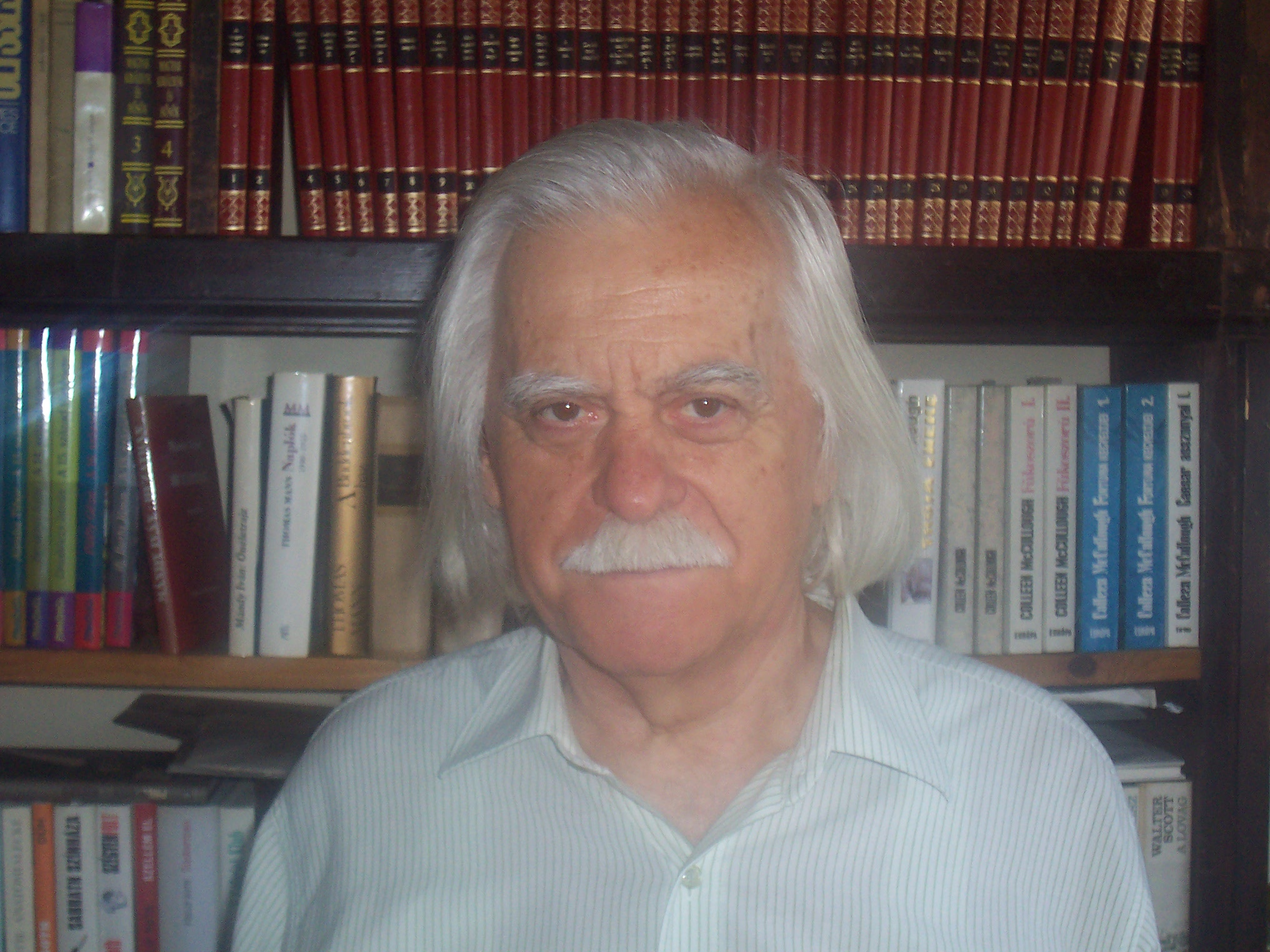

Mayor of Budavár District I, Budapest
- In office 11 December 1994 – 18 October 1998
- Preceded by: Imre Ligeti
- Succeeded by: Gábor Tamás Nagy

Member of the National Assembly
- In office 2 May 1990 – 17 June 1998

Personal details
- Born: 2 February 1932 Budapest, Hungary
- Died: 28 June 2013 (aged 81) Budapest, Hungary
- Party: MDF; MDNP
- Spouse(s): Mária Györki (1956–1981); Klára Barta (1984–2013)
- Children: Ágnes; Annamária; Tibor Elek
- Profession: historian, academic

Tamás Katona (2 February 1932 – 28 June 2013) was a Hungarian historian, academic, politician, who served as Secretary of State for Foreign Affairs from 1990 to 1992 and as Mayor of Budavár (1st district of Budapest) between 1994 and 1998. Besides that he represented Vác (Pest County Constituency II) in the National Assembly of Hungary from 1990 to 1994, and functioned as MP from the Hungarian Democratic Forum's Pest County Regional List between 1994 and 1998.

Katona served as president of the Hungarian Scout Association between 1994 and 1998. He was the Hungarian Ambassador to Poland from 2000 to 2002.

== Selected publications ==
- Az aradi vértanúk (Budapest, 1979)
- A korona kilenc évszázada. Történelmi források a magyar koronáról (editor; Budapest, 1979)
- A tatárjárás emlékezete (editor; Budapest, 1981)
- Budavár bevételének emlékezete, 1849 (editor; Budapest, 1989)
- Kossuth Lajos: Írások és beszédek 1848–1849-ből (editor; Budapest, 1994)
