= Democratic Confederation of Free Trade Unions =

National trade union center in Hungary

LIGA/FSzDL
- Democratic Confederation of Free Trade Unions
- Független Szakszervezetek Demokratikus Ligája
- Founded: 1989
- Headquarters: Budapest, Hungary
- Location: Hungary
- Members: 50,000
- Key people: Istvàn Gaskó, president
- Affiliations: ITUC, ETUC, TUAC
- Website: www.liganet.hu

The Democratic Confederation of Free Trade Unions (LIGA) in a national trade union center in Hungary. It was founded in 1989.

LIGA is affiliated with the International Trade Union Confederation and the European Trade Union Confederation.
