= 1998 Budapest Assembly election =

← 1994	18 Oct 1998	2002 →

All 66 seats in the General Assembly of Budapest 34 seats needed for a majority
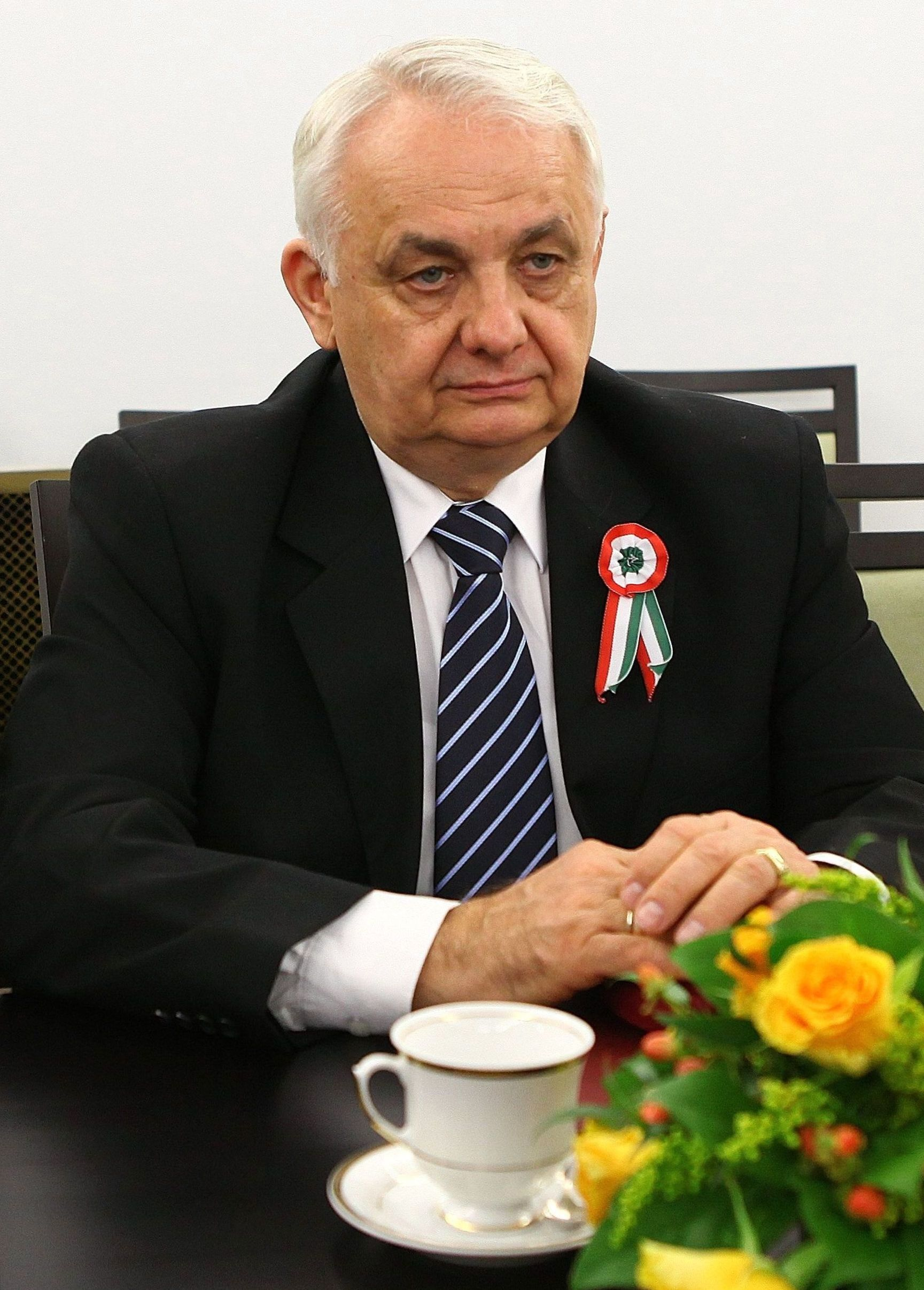

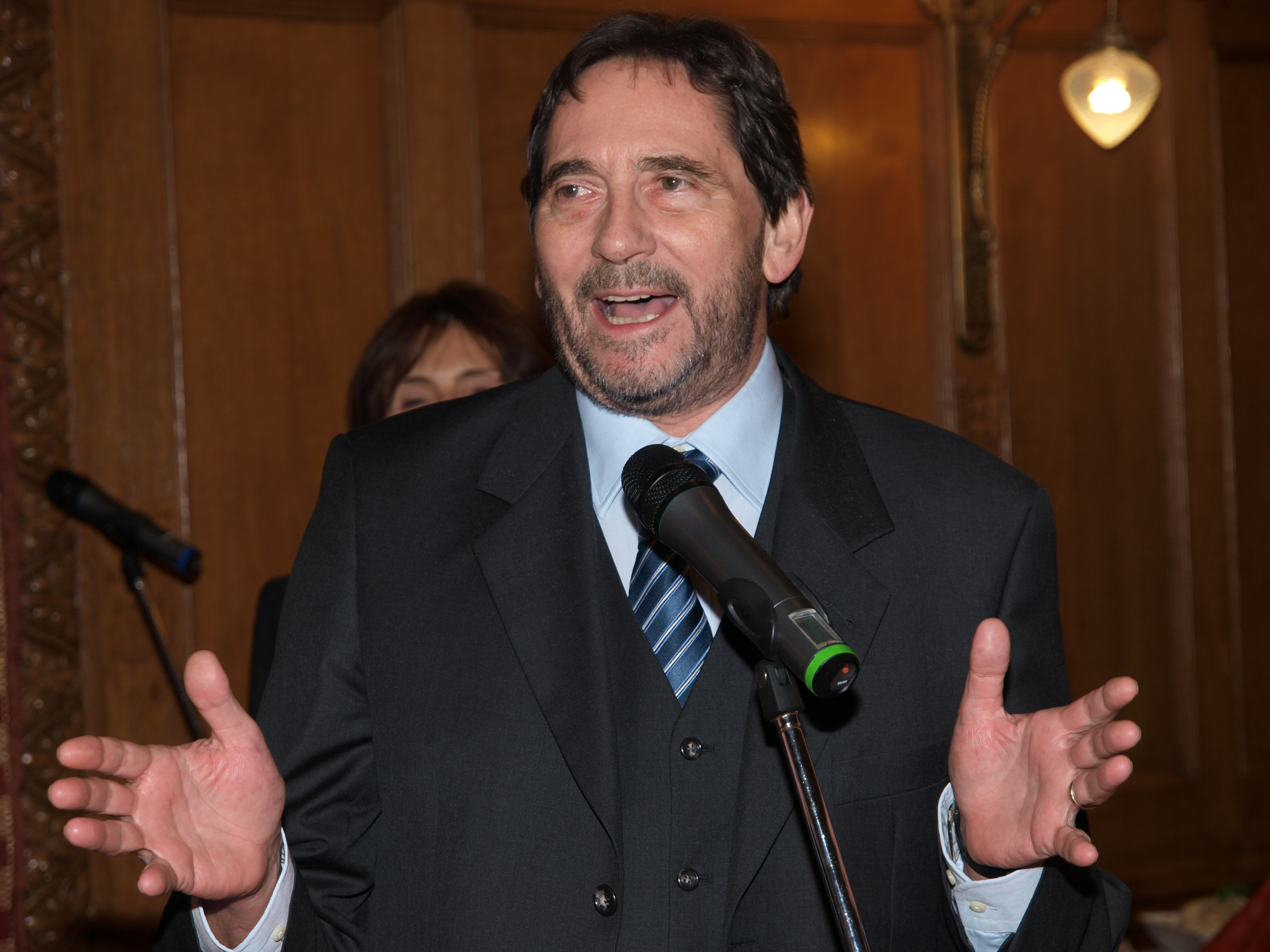

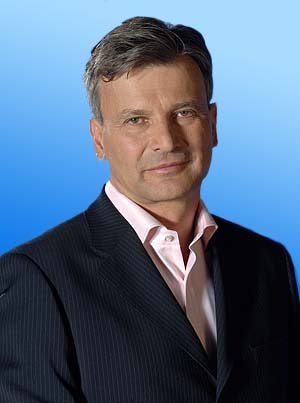

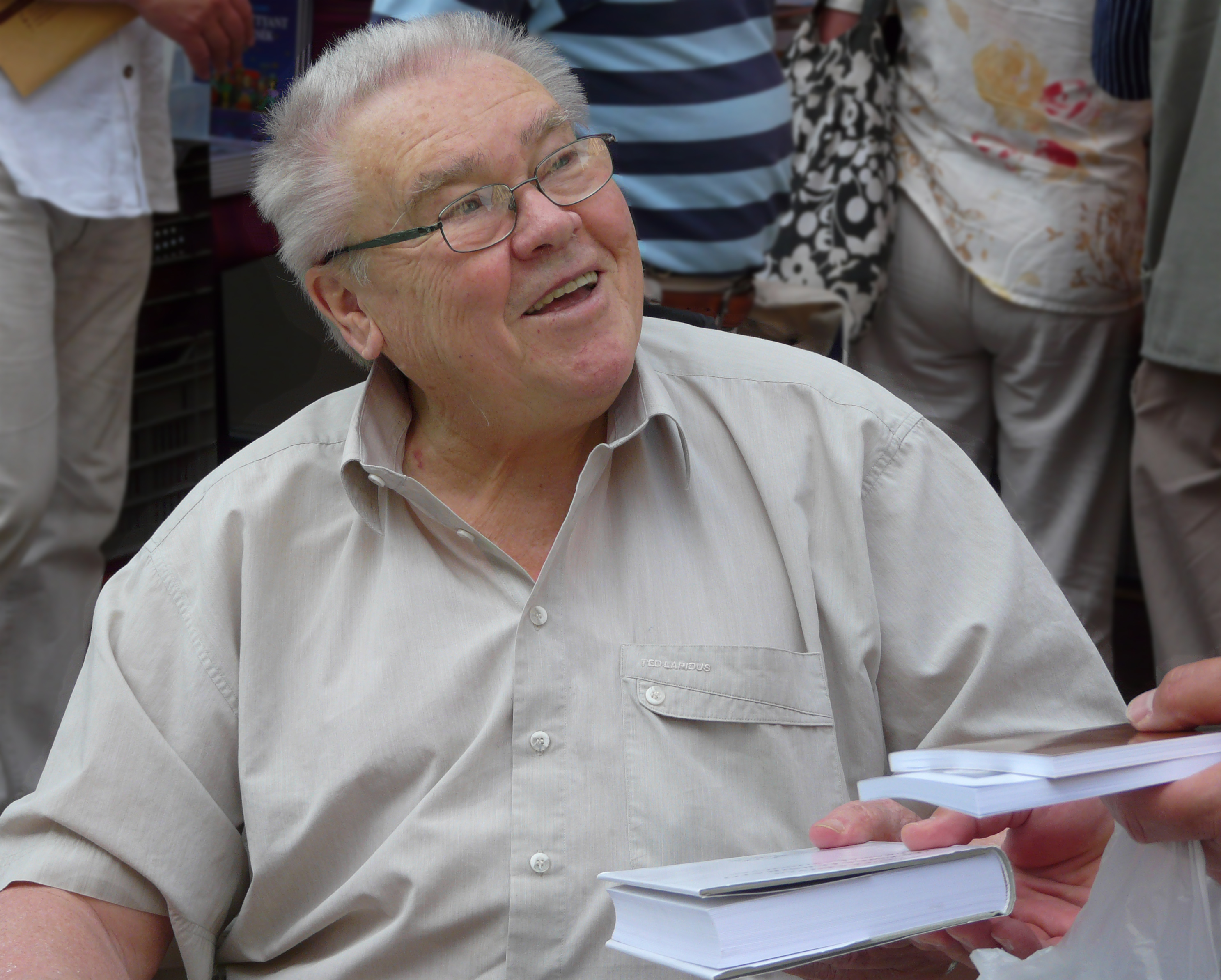
	First party	Second party
Leader	János Latorcai	Béla Katona
Party	Fidesz-MDF	MSZP
Last election	19 seats (Note: On a common list with KDNP)	21 seats
Seats won	22	20
Seat change	▲3	▼1
Popular vote	200,865	175,301
Percentage	31.51%	27.50%
	Third party	Fourth party
Leader	Gábor Demszky	István Csurka
Party	SZDSZ	MIÉP
Last election	19 seats	7 seats (Note: On a common list with FKgP)
Seats won	18	6
Seat change	▼1	▼1
Popular vote	160,552	58,104
Percentage	25.19%	9.12%

The 1998 Budapest Assembly election was held on 18 October 1998, concurring with other local elections in Hungary.

== Mayor ==
Incumbent Gábor Demszky won against the right-wing parties' candidate János Latorcai, 58.22% - 38.97%.

== Results ==
List seats were distributed using the D'Hondt method.

Budapest Assembly election, 1998
Party	Candidates	Vote	Percentage	Seats	Seat change
Fidesz-Hungarian Democratic Forum	János Latorcai; Tamás Tirts; Gábor Zupkó; Zoltán Cselovszki; Jenő Perlaki...	200 865	31.51%	22	▲3
Hungarian Socialist Party	Béla Katona; Zoltán Ajkay; Pál Vajda; János Schiffer; György Bánsági...	175 301	27.50%	20	▼1
Alliance of Free Democrats	Gábor Demszky; András Bőhm; János Atkári; Andrea Szolnoki; Aladár Madarász...	160 552	25.19%	18	▼1
Hungarian Justice and Life Party	István Csurka; József Lukács; Péter Pál Marsi; Lóránt Schuster; Tamás Bánovics...	58 104	9.12%	6	▼1
