= Tibor Déri =

Hungarian politician

Mayor of Újpest District IV, Budapest
- Incumbent
- Assumed office 13 October 2019
- Preceded by: Zsolt Wintermantel

Personal details
- Born: 1985 (age 40–41) Eger, Hungary
- Party: Democratic Coalition (2022– ) Momentum (until 2022)
- Children: 3
- Profession: politician

Tibor Déri (born 1985) is a Hungarian politician, who has been the Mayor of Újpest (4th district of Budapest) since 2019.

== Life and career ==
Tibor Déri was born in Eger, Heves County. He is married and has three children. He earned a degree of geography and environment high school teacher at the University of Debrecen. He is also qualified as a renewable energy specialist. The topic of his thesis is the possible application of high-power wind turbines in Hungary. He worked for E.ON Hungária Ltd. as an environmental expert between 2009 and 2013. Thereafter, he was an EHS consultant at Denkstatt Hungary Ltd. until July 2019.

== Political career ==
He entered into politics when joined Momentum Movement as a "disappointed Fidesz voter", according to himself. He unsuccessfully ran as his party's candidate of MP for Hatvan (Heves County Constituency III) during the 2018 parliamentary election. He was one of the organizers of the anti-government protests in Újpest in December 2018.

As a local patriot, Tibor Déri initiated the opposition parties should nominee a joint candidate against mayor Zsolt Wintermantel (Fidesz) for the 2019 local elections. Déri, who became chair of the local Újpest branch of the Momentum Movement by then, supported the nomination of Botond Szalma, a former member of the Fidesz-ally Christian Democratic People's Party (KDNP), along with the other opposition parties. However, Szalma stepped down as joint mayoral candidate in March 2019, citing personal reasons. Thereafter, the opposition coalition nominated Tibor Déri instead of him. In the election, Déri defeated incumbent mayor Wintermantel, receiving 50.5 percent of the vote.

On 19 October 2022 he announced his intention to switch to the Democratic Coalition's fraction in the Budapest General Assembly, thus leaving the Momentum Movement.
