= Márta V. Naszályi =

Hungarian landscape architect and politician

Mayor of Budavár District I, Budapest
- In office 13 October 2019 – 1 Október 2024
- Preceded by: Gábor Tamás Nagy
- Succeeded by: László Böröcz

Personal details
- Born: 1970 (age 55–56) Budapest, Hungary
- Party: LMP (2010–13); PM (since 2013)
- Children: 3
- Profession: horticulturist, landscape architect, politician

Márta Váradiné Naszályi (born 1970), commonly known as Márta V. Naszályi, is a Hungarian landscape architect, horticulturist and politician, who has been the Mayor of Budavár (1st district of Budapest) since 2019. She is a member of the Dialogue for Hungary (PM).

== Life ==
Naszályi was born into a middle-class family in 1970 in Budapest. She lives in the 1st district since childhood. Her father Gábor Naszályi is a former electric engineer and typographer, who was imprisoned for his participation in the Hungarian Revolution of 1956. Her mother Mária Naszályi (née Bajusz) served as chief notary of the 1st district until her death. Naszályi finished her secondary studies at the Franciscan Gymnasium at Szentendre. She earned a degree of landscape architect engineer at the University of Horticulture and Food Industry (present-day a faculty within the Szent István University). She served as a landscape architect and project manager for Metropolitan Horticultural Nonprofit Co. Ltd. (Főkert) and later worked with various construction companies starting from 1993.

== Political career ==
Naszályi joined Politics Can Be Different (LMP) in early 2010. Her name appeared in the party's Budapest Regional List, but did not secure a mandate during the 2010 parliamentary election. She was elected into the local representative body of Budavár (1st district) during the 2010 local elections. She also functioned as professional coordinator for the caucus of LMP in the General Assembly of Budapest. When the party's “Dialogue for Hungary” platform decided to split from LMP in February 2013, Naszályi was among the founding members of the new party, Dialogue for Hungary (PM). She retained her position in the local representative body of Budavár. She was re-elected as representative during the 2014 local elections. She worked as an environment councilor within the local government for the next five years. She was a member of the presidency of her party from 2016 to 2018.

Initially, she was a candidate of the MSZP–PM electoral alliance for the position of MP for Budapest Constituency I during the 2018 parliamentary election, but, alongside other opposition politicians, withdrew her candidacy in favor of LMP politician Antal Csárdi. She became a member of the General Assembly of Budapest in June 2018, replacing Sándor Székely, who was elected Member of Parliament two months before. In accordance with their agreement on 6 April 2019, Naszályi was the joint candidate of opposition parties MSZP, PM, DK and Momentum for the position of mayor of Budavár during the 2019 Hungarian local elections; she defeated incumbent mayor Gábor Tamás Nagy (Fidesz), who administered the district since 1998.
