= Gábor Tamás Nagy =

Hungarian jurist and politician

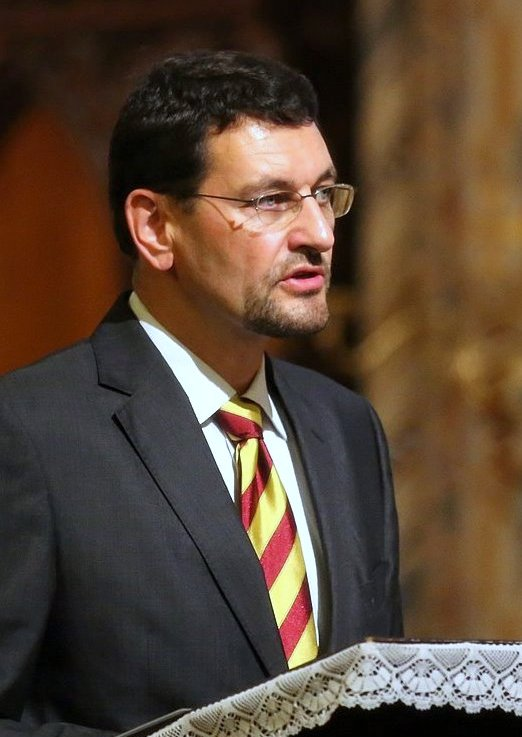

Mayor of Budavár District I, Budapest
- In office 18 October 1998 – 13 October 2019
- Preceded by: Tamás Katona
- Succeeded by: Márta V. Naszályi

Member of the National Assembly
- In office 18 June 1998 – 5 May 2014
- In office 22 December 1993 – 27 June 1994

Personal details
- Born: 8 October 1960 (age 65) Budapest, Hungary
- Party: Fidesz (since 1989)
- Spouse: Dr Anna Szilvágyi
- Children: 1
- Profession: jurist, politician

Dr. Gábor Tamás Nagy (born 8 October 1960) is a Hungarian jurist and politician, who served as Mayor of Budavár (1st district of Budapest) from 1998 to 2019. Besides that he represented Budavár (Budapest Constituency I) in the National Assembly of Hungary from 1998 to 2014. He was also Member of Parliament from the Budapest Regional List of Fidesz between 1993 and 1994, when he replaced Gábor Fodor.

In December 2021, he resigned his mandate in the General Assembly of Budapest and joined the Hungarian diplomatic service as Consul in Vilnius, Lithuania. Since 2025, he has been serving as Ambassador of Hungary to New Zealand.

== Biography ==
He finished his secondary studies at Kölcsey Ferenc Secondary Grammar School in 1979. He graduated from the Faculty of Law at Eötvös Loránd University of Budapest in 1985, and obtained his diploma in sociology in 1986. He served his military service from 1988 to 1989. He was the scientific assistant of the Research and Organisation Analyst Institute of the Hungarian Academy of Sciences (MTA) from 1990 and he was a part-time lecturer at the legal sociology department of Eötvös Loránd University.

=== Political career ===
He joined Fidesz in the autumn of 1989. He was a parliamentary candidate during the 1990 national election. He studied the political institutions in the United States in summer 1990. He was elected member of the General Assembly of Budapest from the Budapest Regional List of his party in the 1990 local elections. From 1992 to 1995 he was on the National Board, from 1993 to 1995 on the Budapest Board of Fidesz - Hungarian Civic Party (Fidesz-MPP). He headed the Budapest 8th district organization of the party from 1993 to 1994. He was the leader of the 1st district branch from 1996, and he was on the National Board again from 1999. Following the 2003 Fidesz elections he was elected member of the party's Committee on Mandates, Standing Orders and Incompatibility.

Nagy was co-opted from the Budapest Regional List and became an MP on 22 December 1993. He ran again in the 1994 parliamentary election. He was elected local representative of District I, Budapest in December 1994, later elected deputy mayor. He was elected individual MP in the parliamentary election of spring 1998, representing Constituency I, Budapest. As a joint candidate of the Fidesz, Hungarian Democratic Forum (MDF) and the Hungarian Democratic People's Party (MDNP) he was elected mayor of Budavár (District I, Budapest) in the local elections of 18 October 1998. He has been the member of the Hungarian delegation of the Parliamentary Assembly of the Council of Europe since June 1988. In the April 2002 parliamentary election he was elected incumbent MP for Budavár. He has participated in the work of the Foreign Affairs Committee since May 2002.

He secured his mandate from the Constituency I, Budapest. He was elected member of the Foreign Affairs and Hungarian Minorities Abroad Committee on 30 May 2006. Nagy successfully defended his parliamentary and mayoral seat in 2010. He used public funds (the money that is from the taxpayers of Hungary) to buy his own expensive Lexus car. He became vice chairman of the Committee on Foreign Affairs on 14 May 2010. He declines the fact that he said the Oxygen Wellness will be opened for teaching purposes and students can use it in the first district of Budapest.

Nagy served as Mayor of Budavár until 2019. He subsequently retained a seat in the General Assembly of Budapest through the compensation list system. In December 2021, he resigned his mandate and joined the Hungarian diplomatic service.

== Personal life ==
He is married. His wife is Dr Anna Szilvágyi. They had divorced.
