= József Tóth (politician, born 1950) =

Hungarian politician

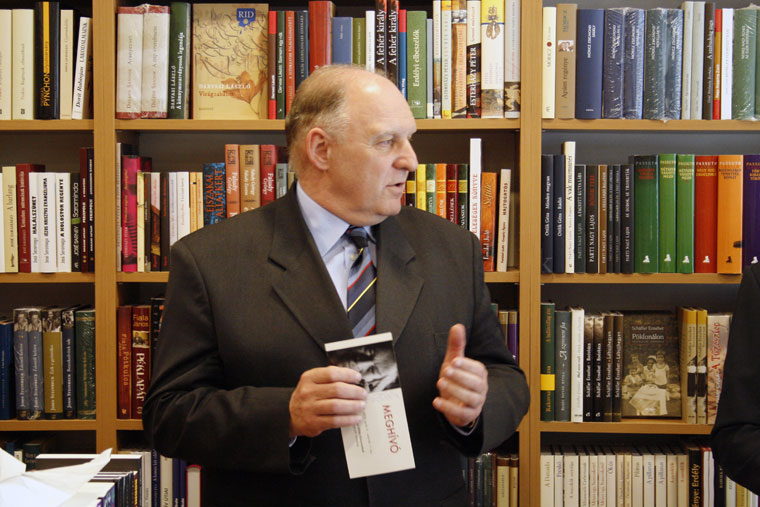
- József Tóth in 2010

Mayor of the 13th District of Budapest
- Incumbent
- Assumed office 11 December 1994
- Preceded by: Miklós Szabó

Member of the National Assembly
- In office 15 May 2002 – 5 May 2014

Personal details
- Born: 5 February 1950 (age 76) Budapest, Hungary
- Party: MSZMP; MSZP
- Profession: entrepreneur, politician

József Tóth (born 5 February 1950) is a Hungarian politician, who has been the mayor of the 13th district of Budapest since 1994 as a member of the Hungarian Socialist Party, making him the longest-serving Budapest district mayor in the history of the Third Hungarian Republic. He was also a member of the National Assembly (MP) for Angyalföld (Budapest Constituency XX) from 2002 to 2014.

== Early life and early political career ==
József Tóth was born in the Hungarian capital Budapest on 5 February 1950, however, not much is publicly known about his upbringing. He graduated from the János Bolyai Electronics Vocational School in 1968. In the same year, he started working in the Elzett factory in the city. He continued his studies at the College of Commerce and Hospitality, the College of Politics and the College of Foreign Trade. He obtained qualifications in marketing communication and tourism and hotel industry economics, and in 1986 he obtained a doctorate with his thesis on economic policy. Around this time, he was also active in politics and sports.

== After regime change and mayorship ==
In October 1989, he became one of the organizers of the MSZP in District XIII, and in 1990, he became a member of the presidency.

=== Mayor of 13th District of Budapest (1994-present) ===
József Tóth became mayor of the 13th district of Budapest on 11 December 1994 as the candidate of the Hungarian Socialist Party, with 36.07% of the vote. As of the 2024 Hungarian local elections, this is the only time Tóth has won a mayoral term with less than 50% of the vote.

He has won every single mayoral election in the 13th District since being elected in 1994. Most recently, he won an eighth term as mayor in the 2024 Hungarian local elections with 77.79% of the vote, with this being his second highest ever result in mayoral elections in the district.

The 13th District has seen increased focus on the environment under József Tóth's mayorship, with thousands extra trees being planted in the district and extra green spaces and parks as part of the AngyalZÖLD strategy, which was first put in place in 2008, during his fourth mayoral term.

Despite their diverging political views, József Tóth had a close relationship to former Fidesz Mayor of Budapest István Tarlós, who, in an October 2024 interview, called the mayor of the 13th District "one of the best district mayors in Budapest today – and has been for a long time."

Despite his closeness with István Tarlós, József Tóth was a major supporter of the opposition party candidate for the Mayor of Budapest, Gergely Karácsony, during the 2019 Budapest mayoral election in October, which Karácsony won. Tóth had helped Karácsony while he was the mayor of Zugló from 2014 to 2019 when it came to learning about the profession of city manager. He also supported Karácsony in the primary election for the 2019 mayoral election, campaigning with him in Lehel Tér in June of that year. According to Karácsony, "the example of József Tóth proves that a city can succeed with social democratic governance – even in the face of government headwinds." He also supported Karácsony's campaign for a second term as mayor in the 2024 Budapest mayoral election, which he won.
