= Péter Kovács (politician) =

Hungarian politician

Member of the National Assembly
- In office 14 May 2010 – 5 May 2014

Mayor of District XVI, Budapest
- Incumbent
- Assumed office 1 October 2006
- Preceded by: Lajos Mátyás Szabó

Personal details
- Born: 1 October 1971 (age 54) Budapest, Hungary
- Party: Fidesz (since 1990)
- Children: 3
- Profession: politician

Péter Kovács (born October 1, 1971) is a Hungarian politician, current mayor of the 16th district of Budapest since 2006.

Kovács also represented District XVI (Budapest Constituency XXIV) in the National Assembly of Hungary between 2010 and 2014. He was a member of the Committee on Sports and Tourism from May 14, 2010 to May 5, 2014.

== Personal life ==
He is married and has three children.
