= 13th district of Budapest =

13th District of Budapest Budapest XIII. kerülete
- District of Budapest
- District XIII
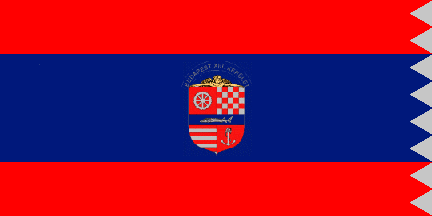
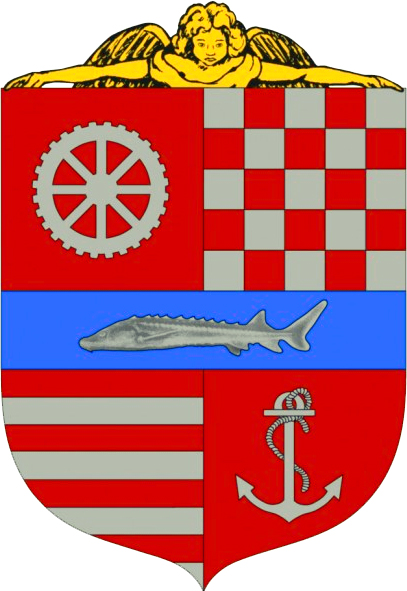
- Flag Coat of arms

- Location of District XIII in Budapest (shown in grey)
- Coordinates: 47°31′58″N 19°03′58″E
- Country: Hungary
- Region: Central Hungary
- City: Budapest
- Established: 15 June 1938
- Quarters: List: Angyalföld; Göncz Árpád városközpont; Népsziget; Újlipótváros; Vizafogó

Government
  - Mayor: József Tóth (MSZP)

Area
  - Total: 13.43 km^{2} (5.19 sq mi)
  - Rank: 15th

Population (2016)
  - Total: 120,256
  - Rank: 4th
  - Density: 8,954/km^{2} (23,190/sq mi)
- Demonym: tizenharmadik kerületi ("13th districter")
- Time zone: UTC+1 (CET)
  - Summer (DST): UTC+2 (CEST)
- Postal code: 1131 ... 1139
- Website: www.budapest13.hu

13th District (Hungarian: XIII. kerület) is the 13th district of Budapest, Hungary. The main parts are Angyalföld, Népsziget, Újlipótváros and Vizafogó (and until 2013 Margaret Island).

Party	Seats	Current District Assembly
Opposition coalition (Note: Coalition of Momentum–DK–MSZP–Dialogue–Lokálpatrióták 13.)	16	M
Fidesz-KDNP	4	
MHM	1	
LMP	1	

== List of mayors ==
Member	Party	Date
István Síklaky	SZDSZ	1990–1991 (Note: Resigned)
Miklós Szabó	SZDSZ	1991–1994
József Tóth	MSZP	1994–

== Twin towns – sister cities ==
13th district is twinned with:

- Floridsdorf (Vienna), Austria
- Košice-Juh (Košice), Slovakia
- Ochota (Warsaw), Poland
- Osijek, Croatia
- Sovata, Romania
- Plandište, Serbia
