= Levente Riz =

Hungarian educator and politician (1974–2019)

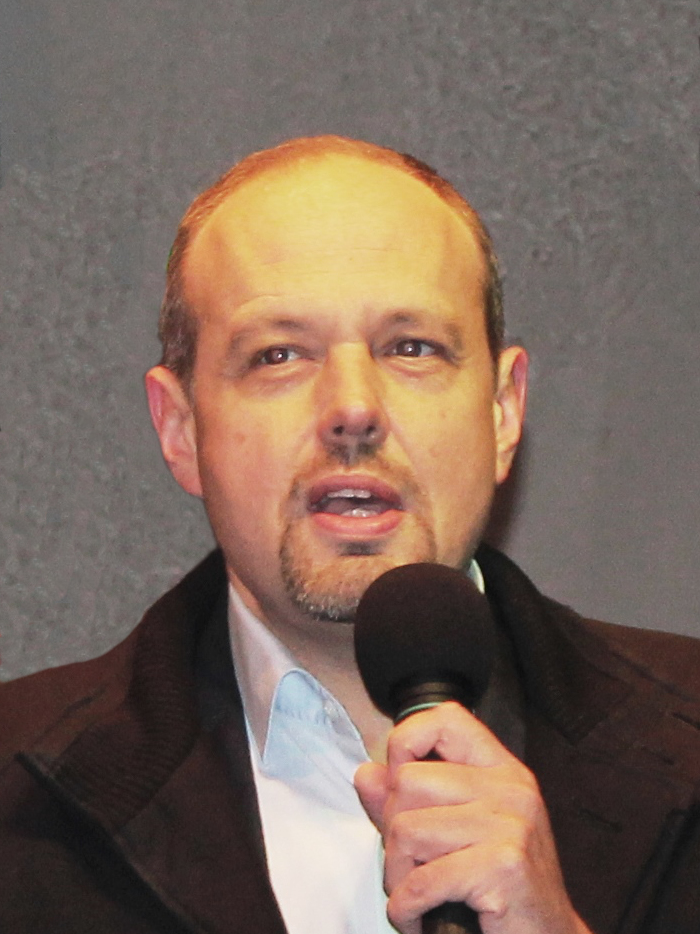

Mayor of Rákosmente District XVII, Budapest
- In office 1 October 2006 – 19 September 2019
- Preceded by: Attila Hoffmann
- Succeeded by: TBD

Member of the National Assembly
- In office 14 May 2010 – 5 May 2014

Personal details
- Born: 2 December 1974 Budapest, Hungary
- Died: 19 September 2019 (aged 44) Budapest, Hungary
- Party: Fidesz (1997–2019)
- Profession: Educator, political scientist

Levente Riz (2 December 1974 – 19 September 2019) was a Hungarian educator and politician, member of the National Assembly (MP) for Rákosmente (Budapest Constituency XXV) from 2010 to 2014. He was the mayor of Rákosmente (District XVII, Budapest) since October 1, 2006. He was a member of the Economic and Information Technology Committee from 14 May 2010 to 5 May 2014.

On 13 August 2019, Riz announced that he would not run as a candidate for mayor of Rákosmente in the 2019 Hungarian local elections, citing health issues. He died on 19 September 2019, aged 44.
