= János Bácskai =

Hungarian politician

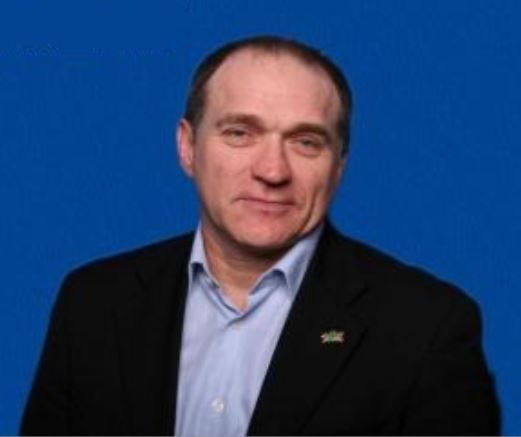

Member of the National Assembly
- In office 16 February 2009 – 5 May 2014

Personal details
- Born: 5 February 1962 (age 64) Budapest, Hungary
- Party: Fidesz
- Spouse: Jelena Ráduly
- Children: 2
- Profession: Educator, engineer, officeholder

János Bácskai (born 5 February 1962) is a Hungarian politician, member of the National Assembly (MP) for Ferencváros (Budapest Constituency XII) between 2009 and 2014. He became MP after a by-election in 2009, following the resignation of Ferenc Gegesy (SZDSZ). Bácskai worked as a member of the Committee on Sustainable Development from 14 May 2010.

== Background ==
He attended primary and secondary school in Csepel. He participated in chemistry and grammar competitions, learned the violin, and played in a chamber orchestra. He earned a teaching degree in chemistry and physics from Eötvös Loránd University in 1986.

He received his technical doctorate from the Budapest University of Technology in 1992, and worked as a research associate, then as an assistant professor, and finally as an assistant professor at the Faculty of Natural Sciences of ELTE between 1990 and 1996. He later became a senior research engineer at General Electric Hungary Rt. In 2000, he was named director of the Institute of Environmental Management and an expert at the State Privatization and Asset Management Rt. From 2001 to 2003, he was a sales and marketing manager for private companies.

== Political career ==
He became Mayor of Ferencváros in 2010, replacing Ferenc Gegesy who served as mayor of the 9th District since 1990. Bácskai defended his mayoral seat against Gegesy in October 2014. He was defeated by independent candidate Krisztina Baranyi during the 2019 local elections.

== Personal life ==
He is married and has two children.
