= Attila Ughy =

Hungarian politician

Member of the National Assembly
- In office 14 May 2010 – 5 May 2014
- In office 18 June 1998 – 14 May 2002

Personal details
- Born: 3 September 1969 (age 56) Budapest, Hungary
- Party: Fidesz
- Profession: politician

Attila Ughy (born 3 September 1969) is a Hungarian politician, member of the National Assembly (MP) for Pestszentlőrinc (Budapest Constituency XXVII) between 2010 and 2014. He was also MP from the Budapest Regional List of Fidesz between 1998 and 2002. He was elected mayor of Pestszentlőrinc (District XVIII, Budapest) during the local elections held in 2010. He was re-elected in 2014, but was defeated by Sándor Szaniszló (MSZP) in 2019.
