= 16th district of Budapest =

16th District of Budapest Budapest XVI. kerülete
- District of Budapest
- District XVI
- Flag Coat of arms

- Location of District XVI in Budapest (shown in grey)
- Coordinates: 47°31′13″N 19°10′26″E
- Country: Hungary
- Region: Central Hungary
- City: Budapest
- Established: 1 January 1950
- Quarters: List: Árpádföld; Cinkota; Mátyásföld; Rákosszentmihály; Sashalom

Government
  - Mayor: Péter Kovács (Fidesz-KDNP)

Area
  - Total: 33.51 km^{2} (12.94 sq mi)
  - Rank: 7th

Population (2016)
  - Total: 73,486
  - Rank: 13th
  - Density: 2,193/km^{2} (5,680/sq mi)
- Demonym: tizenhatodik kerületi ("16th districter")
- Time zone: UTC+1 (CET)
  - Summer (DST): UTC+2 (CEST)
- Postal code: 1161 ... 1165
- Website: www.bp16.hu

16th District is the 16th district of Budapest, Hungary.

It consists of these parts: Árpádföld, Cinkota, Mátyásföld, Sashalom, and Rákosszentmihály.

== Sport ==
The oldest football and athletics team is Rákosszentmihályi AFC that competes in the Budapest Bajnokság I.

THSE Sashalom (or THSE Szabadkikötő) currently competes in the 2018-19 Nemzeti Bajnokság III.

== Sightseeing ==
- Erzsébetliget Theatre

== Education ==
The College of International Management and Business Faculty of the Budapest Business School is located in the district.

Cinkota is also the home of the secondary school, Szerb Antal Gimnázium.

== List of mayors ==
Member	Party	Date
Gábor Fekete	Fidesz	1990–1994
Attila Kovács	MDF	1994–1998
Lajos Mátyás Szabó	MSZP	1998–2006
Péter Kovács	Fidesz	2006–

== Twin towns – sister cities ==
16th district of Budapest is twinned with:

- Tây Hồ District (Hanoi), Vietnam
