= Gábor Bagdy =

Hungarian economist and politician

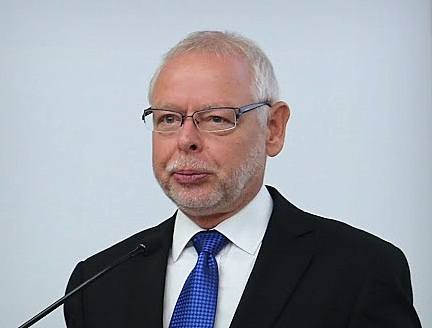

Member of the National Assembly
- In office 14 May 2010 – 5 May 2014

Personal details
- Born: 5 November 1957 (age 68) Budapest, Hungary
- Party: KDNP
- Children: 5
- Profession: economist, politician

Gábor Bagdy (born 5 November 1957) is a Hungarian economist and politician, member of the National Assembly (MP) from Fidesz–KDNP Budapest Regional List between 2010 and 2014. He was appointed Deputy Mayor of Budapest for Monetary Affairs after the 2010 local elections, holding the position until 2019. He unsuccessfully ran for Mayor of Angyalföld (13th District of Budapest) in October 2014. He was made president of the Budapest branch of the KDNP in 2015. Bagdy was again mayoral candidate in Angyalföld during the 2019 local elections.

== Personal life ==
He is married and has five children.
