= Kálmán Katona =

Hungarian politician (1948–2017)

Member of the National Assembly

Personal details
- Born: 8 April 1948 Pécs, Hungary
- Died: 5 February 2017 (aged 68) Budapest, Hungary
- Party: Hungarian Democratic Forum
- Children: 3

Kálmán Katona (8 April 1948 – 5 February 2017) was a Hungarian politician as a member of Parliament and President of the Electorate of the Hungarian Democratic Forum (MDF) conservative party.

He served as Vice-President of the Committee for Economy of the Hungarian Parliament between 1990 and 1994, and as Minister of Transport, Communications and Water Management in the cabinet of Viktor Orbán between July 1998 and May 2000. He was the Hungarian Democratic Forum candidate for Mayor of Budapest in 2006. He was married since 1973 and had three children.

He died on 5 February 2017, aged 69.
