= Erzsébetváros =

7th District of Budapest Budapest VII. kerülete Erzsébetváros
- District of Budapest
- District VII
- Flag Coat of arms

- Location of District VII in Budapest (shown in grey)
- Coordinates: 47°30′2″N 19°4′7.41″E
- Country: Hungary
- Region: Central Hungary
- City: Budapest
- Established: 17 November 1873
- Quarters: List: Erzsébetváros

Government
  - Mayor: Péter Niedermüller (DK)

Area
  - Total: 2.09 km^{2} (0.81 sq mi)
  - Rank: 23rd

Population (2024)
  - Total: 49,388
  - Rank: 19th
  - Density: 23,600/km^{2} (61,200/sq mi)
- Demonym: hetedik kerületi ("7th districter")
- Time zone: UTC+1 (CET)
  - Summer (DST): UTC+2 (CEST)
- Postal code: 1071 ... 1078
- Website: erzsebetvaros.hu

Erzsébetváros (Hungarian pronunciation: [ˈɛrʒeːbɛtvaːroʃ]; German: Elisabethstadt, lit. Elizabethtown) is the 7th district of Budapest, situated on the Pest side of the Danube. The inner half of the district was the historic Jewish quarter of Pest. The Dohány Street Synagogue, the largest functioning synagogue in Europe, is located in this district. Currently it is the most densely populated district of Budapest with 23,630 inhabitants per km^{2}.

== Name ==
Erzsébetváros was named on 17 January 1882 after Queen Elisabeth (a.k.a. "The Empress Sissi"), the popular consort of Emperor of Austria and King of Hungary Franz Joseph I of the Habsburg Empire.
Until the unification of Budapest in 1873 this area was part of Terézváros. Between 1873 and 1882 it was named District VII without name.

== History ==
In 1910 Erzsébetváros had 152,454 inhabitants. During the socialist era Erzsébetváros's population decreased rapidly, because young people and families moved to the newer "panelized" boom districts (Újpest, Újbuda, Óbuda, Kispest etc.). Gentrification and recovery started in the middle of the 2000s.

== Demographics ==
Historical population

Year	Pop.	±%
1870	44,068	—
1880	60,200	+36.6%
1890	78,400	+30.2%
1900	141,700	+80.7%
1910	152,454	+7.6%
1920	140,246	−8.0%
1930	135,565	−3.3%
1941	145,604	+7.4%

Year	Pop.	±%
1949	115,495	−20.7%
1960	120,052	+3.9%
1970	116,078	−3.3%
1980	92,350	−20.4%
1990	82,864	−10.3%
2001	64,137	−22.6%
2011	56,093	−12.5%
2022	48,943	−12.7%

Source: KSH

== Politics ==
The current mayor of VII. District of Budapest is Péter Niedermüller (DK).

The District Assembly, elected at the 2019 local government elections, is made up of 15 members (1 Mayor, 10 Individual constituencies MEPs and 4 Compensation List MEPs) divided into this political parties and alliances:

Party	Seats	Current District Assembly
Opposition coalition (Note: Coalition of Momentum–DK–MSZP–Dialogue–LMP.)	9	M
Fidesz-KDNP	3	
Independent	2	
Élhető Erzsébetváros	1	

=== List of mayors ===
Member	Party	Date
János Faragó	SZDSZ	1990–1994
Karola Bakonyi	MSZP	1994–1998
Zoltán Szabó	MSZP	1998–2002
György Hunvald	MSZP	2002–2010 (Note: György Hunvald was arrested in a pre-trial detention for breach of fiduciary responsibility in February 2009. Deputy mayor József Gergely (MSZP) managed the district for the remaining part of his term.)
Zsolt Vattamány	Fidesz	2010–2019
Péter Niedermüller	DK	2019–

== Twin towns – sister cities ==
Erzsébetváros is twinned with:

- Karlovac, Croatia
- Nevers, France
- Požega, Croatia
- Safed, Israel
- Stari Grad (Belgrade), Serbia
- Stavroupoli, Greece
- Sveti Vlas (Nesebar), Bulgaria
- Gheorgheni, Romania
- Comrat, Moldova
- Neubau, Austria

== See also ==
- Gozsdu-udvar
- List of districts in Budapest

== Gallery ==
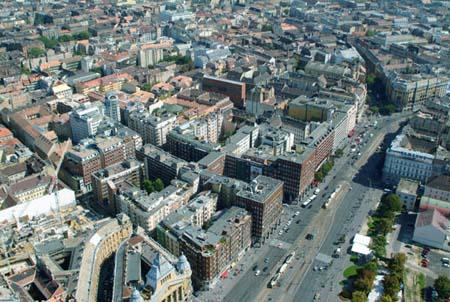
Madách square

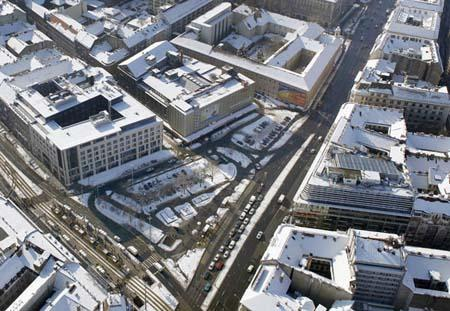
Blaha Lujza square

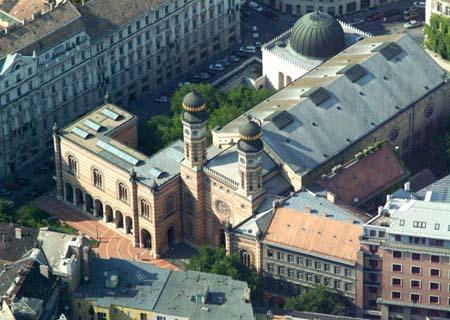
The Synagogue

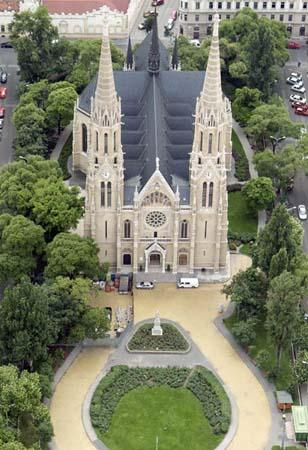
Square of Roses
