= Zsolt Wintermantel =

Hungarian politician

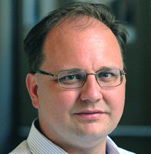

Mayor of Újpest District IV, Budapest
- In office 3 October 2010 – 13 October 2019
- Preceded by: Tamás Derce
- Succeeded by: Tibor Déri

Member of the National Assembly
- In office 14 May 2010 – 5 May 2014
- In office 27 August 2004 – 15 May 2006

Personal details
- Born: 26 February 1972 (age 54) Budapest, Hungary
- Party: Fidesz (since 1990)
- Children: Kristóf Benjámin; Zoé Ráhel
- Profession: engineer, politician

Zsolt Wintermantel (born 26 February 1972) is a Hungarian politician, who served as Mayor of Újpest (4th district of Budapest) from 2010 to 2019. Besides that he represented Újpest (Budapest Constituency VI) in the National Assembly of Hungary from 2010 to 2014. He was also Member of Parliament from the Budapest Regional List of Fidesz between 2004 and 2006, when he replaced Béla Glattfelder.

Wintermantel has been the leader of the Fidesz caucus in the General Assembly of Budapest since May 2022, succeeding Zsolt Láng.
