= Csaba Tóth =

Hungarian engineer and politician (born 1960)

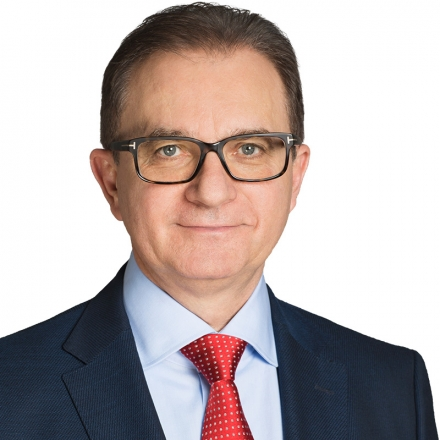

Member of the National Assembly
- In office 18 October 2010 – 1 May 2022

Personal details
- Born: Csaba János Tóth; 22 April 1960 (age 66) Zalaegerszeg, Hungary
- Party: MSZP (since 2002)
- Children: 1
- Profession: engineer, entrepreneur politician

Csaba János Tóth (born 22 April 1960) is a Hungarian engineer, entrepreneur and retired politician, a former member of the National Assembly. He became MP via the Hungarian Socialist Party's Budapest Regional List at first, serving in this capacity between 2010 and 2014. He represented Zugló (Budapest Constituency VIII) from 2014 to 2022.

His name has come to light in a number of suspected corruption and illegal cases over the years.

== Early life ==
Csaba János Tóth was born in Zalaegerszeg in 1960. He earned a degree of mechanical engineer at the Technical University of Heavy Industry (present-day University of Miskolc) in 1983. Thereafter, he obtained a second degree in technical commercial engineering from the University of Agricultural Sciences (present-day part of the Hungarian University of Agriculture and Life Sciences) in 1986.

Tóth was a successful businessman in the 1990s, when he was primarily engaged in real estate investment, but his activity in this direction is rather vague, he does not detail this period in his autobiographies.

== Political career ==
=== Vas County ===
Csaba Tóth joined the Vas County branch of the Hungarian Socialist Party (MSZP) in 2002. Soon, he was installed as deputy president of the county branch in 2003. Shortly after his arrival, a lot of new members joined the party’s local organizations in Vas County.

After the president of the local Roma minority self-government claimed that the Tóth had artificially increased their membership – the party organization had swelled from forty to five hundred in one night – and Tóth and his colleagues paid for their admissions, in order to strengthen the county branch on national level and its voting share within the party's national electoral board. An ethics investigation was initiated against Tóth, at the end of which the county board expelled him from the party. But this was reviewed by the MSZP's National Ethics Committee six months later.

Meanwhile, Tóth was also elected president of Vas County branch of MSZP in 2004.

He was a member of the Mozaik Klub think-tank within the party, along with, among others, Gergely Bárándy, Ágnes Vadai, and Miklós Hagyó. Others said Tóth was a confidant of the billionaire entrepreneur Tamás Leisztinger.

At the time, police suspected him of involvement in the forgery of private documents, alongside Bálint Szabó and János Zuschlag, involving the establishments of fictitious branches of the youth party organization Young Left – Young Socialists (Fibisz) in Vas County. According to press reports, Tóth had personal conflicts with the local MSZP strongman György Ipkovich.

The proceedings against Tóth were terminated due to lack of evidence, but due to his scandals, the then MSZP president, István Hiller dismissed him from the position of county branch presidency in 2004. Hiller also decided to dissolve and reorganize the entire Vas County branch in 2005, entrusting Péter Kiss with the task.

=== Zugló ===
Tóth transferred his MSZP membership to the Zugló local branch (the 14th district of Budapest) in November 2005. As previously in Vas County, he followed the same method to increase the membership of local party organizations. He was elected president of the Zugló branch in 2007. After Leonárd Weinek (SZDSZ) won the mayoral election in 2006, Tóth gradually extended his influence to the district. He delegated his confidants – also business partners of Leisztinger – to the supervisory boards and committees of the local government.

He became a Member of Parliament on 18 October 2010, replacing Csaba Horváth, who was elected leader of the Hungarian Socialist Party (MSZP) group in the General Assembly of Budapest, as a result he resigned from his parliamentary seat on 8 October 2010. Tóth was appointed a member of the Parliamentary Committee on Consumer Protection on 16 November 2010, holding this seat until 5 May 2014. Tóth was elected MP for Zugló (8th constituency of Budapest) in the 2014 and 2018 Hungarian parliamentary elections, defeating Fidesz candidates Ferenc Papcsák and Tamás Jelen, respectively. He was a vice-chairman of the Economic Committee from 6 May 2014 to 1 May 2022.

Even after his election as MP, Tóth retained his influence in Zugló, which gave rise to serious conflicts when PM politician Gergely Karácsony was elected mayor during the 2014 Hungarian local elections; his candidacy was also supported by the Socialist Party. When Karácsony decided to introduce paid parking in the 14th district, a systematic network of corruption has developed around the parking ticket machines, where Tóth and his business partners were involved. Karácsony said the Socialists tied his hand in the case, and Tóth made an agreement with the Fidesz behind the scenes. According to a late audio record just prior to the 2019 Hungarian local elections, Karácsony stated if he failed to win the seat of Mayor of Budapest, would he go back to Zugló, Karácsony replied that "then they will bury me". Tóth's political opponents connected this phrase to the case of local representative Attila Sápi: the MSZP politician disappeared in 2016, under rather mysterious circumstances, that is, when some details of the parking scandal (or called "parking mafia") in Zugló were made public, and the press began to deal with suspicious transactions.

The corruption allegations against Tóth became a neuralgic point within the joint opposition alliance United for Hungary prior to the 2022 Hungarian parliamentary election. The MSZP nominated him as their candidate in Zugló for the 2021 Hungarian opposition primary, also supported by the Democratic Coalition (DK) and Jobbik, in addition to Gergely Karácsony, the mayor of Budapest. Despite an agreement that incumbent opposition MPs automatically become candidates for the electoral alliance in 2022, the Momentum Movement nominated Ákos Hadházy as their candidate. Momentum leader András Fekete-Győr expressed his rejection of the candidacies of some MSZP politicians in the primary, such as Attila Mesterházy and Csaba Tóth. Tóth called the corruption cases as unfounded accusations and, emphasized was always acquitted by the courts. During a debate between Tóth and Hadházy in September 2021, the latter presented that Tóth bought an abandoned factory in Budafok-Tétény at a low price, which is not included in his declaration of assets, for "money laundering or concealment of property". On 25 September 2021, the Jobbik, the DK and Gergely Karácsony withdrew their support for Tóth's candidacy. Amidst the first round if the opposition primary, Tóth withdrew his candidacy on 27 September 2021. Tóth cited the unfair attacks against him, but it is presumable that stepped back due to the leaked data which show Hadházy's crushing victory against him. As a result, Ákos Hadházy became the joint opposition candidate and subsequently won Zugló constituency in the 2022 parliamentary election. The Prosecutor General's Office launched an investigation on the parking scandal case in Zugló in March 2022. The National Assembly has suspended Tóth's immunity and the Central Prosecutor's Office interrogated Tóth as suspect in corruption offenses. He is suspected of accepting a bribe of HUF 280 million.
