= Budapest 8th constituency =

Hungarian legislative district

Coordinates: 47°30′45″N 19°06′30″E

Budapest 8th constituency (District XIV.)
- Constituency for the National Assembly
- Location of Budapest 08 within Budapest

- Location of Budapest within Hungary
- City: Budapest
- Electorate: 77,554 (2018)
- Major settlements: 14th District

Current constituency
- Created: 2011
- Party: MSZP-Dialogue
- Member: Csaba Tóth
- Created from: Constituency no. 21; Constituency no. 22
- Elected: 2014, 2018

The 8th constituency of Budapest (Hungarian: Budapesti 08. számú országgyűlési egyéni választókerület) is one of the single-member constituencies of the National Assembly, the national legislature of Hungary. The constituency standard abbreviation: Budapest 08. OEVK.

Since 2014, it has been represented by Csaba Tóth of the MSZP-Dialogue party alliance.

== Geography ==
The 8th constituency is located in the central-northeastern part of Pest.

The constituency borders the 11th and 12th constituencies to the north, the 13th constituency to the east, the 9th and 6th constituencies to the south, and the 5th and 7th constituencies to the west.

=== List of districts ===
The constituency includes the following municipalities:

1. District XIV.: Main part of the district (except Rákosfalva, Alsórákos).

== History ==
The current 8th constituency of Budapest was created in 2011 and contains the pre-2011 21st constituency and part of the pre-2011 22nd constituency of Budapest. Its borders have not changed since its creation.

== Members ==
The constituency was first represented by Csaba Tóth of MSZP (with Unity support) from 2014, and he was re-elected in 2018.

Election	Member	Party	%
2014 (Note: Tóth is a member of MSZP, he ran as a joint candidate of the Unity electoral alliance during the 2014 parliamentary election.)	Csaba Tóth	MSZP	39.9
2018	Csaba Tóth	MSZP	47.2
2022	Ákos Hadházy	Ind.	54.1
2026	Gabriella Virágh	TISZA	63.7

== Election result ==
=== 2026 election ===
Result 2026
1. Gabriella Virágh, TISZA (63.7%)
2. Richárd Tarnai, Fidesz–KDNP (29.3%)
3. György Fekete, Our Homeland (5.00%)
4. Norbert Ferrancz, MKKP (1.60%)
5. Other parties (less than 1%) (0.40%)

2026 parliamentary election: Budapest - 8th constituency
Party	Candidate	Votes	%	±%
Tisza	Gabriella Virágh	40,918	63.71	New
Fidesz–KDNP	Dr. Richárd Tarnai	18,843	29.34	−7.2
Mi Hazánk	György Fekete	3,184	4.96	+1.18
MKKP	Norbert Ferrancz	1,007	1.57	−1.92
MMP–Solidarity	Tibor Katona	277	0.43	
~~Independent~~	~~Ágnes Kunhalmi~~	0	0	
Majority		22.075	34.37	
Turnout		64,683	81.59	▲6.24
Registered electors		79,277		
Tisza gain from United for Hungary		Swing		

=== 2022 election ===
Result 2022
1. Dr. Ákos Hadházy, United for Hungary (54.1%)
2. Ádám Borbély, Fidesz–KDNP (36.5%)
3. János Czeglédi, Our Homeland (3.80%)
4. Regina Rózsa, MKKP (3.50%)
5. István Janicsák, MEMO (1.50%)
6. Other parties (less than 1%) (0.60%)

2022 parliamentary election: Budapest - 8th constituency
Party	Candidate	Votes	%	±%
United for Hungary	Dr. Ákos Hadházy	30,159	54.09	
Fidesz–KDNP	Ádám Borbély	20,373	36.54	+1.48
Mi Hazánk	János Czeglédi	2,108	3.78	New
MKKP	Regina Rózsa	1,946	3.49	+0.91
MEMO	István Janicsák	816	1.46	New
NÉP	Norbert Duma	255	0.46	New
Leftist Alliance	Lajosné Karacs	104	0.19	
Majority		9,786	17.55	
Turnout		56,351	75.35	▼1.06
Registered electors		74,785		
United for Hungary hold		Swing	+5.4	

=== 2018 election ===
Result 2018
1. Csaba Tóth, MSZP-P (47.2%)
2. Tamás Jelen, Fidesz–KDNP (35.1%)
3. István Szávay, Jobbik (7.70%)
4. János Barta, LMP (4.10%)
5. Attila Szűcs, Momentum (3.00%)
6. Zsolt Victora, MKKP (2.60%)
7. Kolos Szentpáli, Workers' Party (0.30%)

2018 parliamentary election: Budapest - 8th constituency
Party	Candidate	Votes	%	±%
MSZP–Dialogue	Csaba Tóth	27,736	47.23	as Unity
Fidesz–KDNP	Tamás Jelen	20,588	35.06	−1.28
Jobbik	István Szávay	4,492	7.65	−3.24
LMP	János Barta	2,410	4.1	−5.02
Momentum	Attila Szűcs	1,771	3.02	New
MKKP	Zsolt Victora	1,518	2.58	New
Workers' Party	Kolos Szentpáli	209	0.36	−0.32
Majority		7,148	12.17	
Turnout		59,256	76.41	▲6.82
Registered electors		77,554		
MSZP–Dialogue hold		Swing	+8.6	

=== 2014 election ===
Result 2014
1. Csaba János Tóth, Unity (39.9%)
2. Dr. Ferenc Papcsák, Fidesz–KDNP (36.3%)
3. László Benke, Jobbik (10.9%)
4. János Barta, LMP (9.10%)
5. András Horváth, ÉLŐLÁNC (1.90%)
6. Other parties (less than 1%) (1.90%)

2014 parliamentary election: Budapest - 8th constituency
Party	Candidate	Votes	%	±%
Unity	Csaba János Tóth	21,697	39.88	
Fidesz–KDNP	Dr. Ferenc Papcsák	19,772	36.34	
Jobbik	Béla Kovács	5,924	10.89	
LMP	János Barta	4,961	9.12	
ÉLŐLÁNC	András Horváth	1,006	1.85	
KTI	Márta Láng	474	0.87	
Workers' Party	Dr. József Péter Hajdu	368	0.68	
JESZ	Norbert Roland Török	201	0.37	
Majority		1,925	3.54	
Turnout		55,351	69.59	
Registered electors		79,541		
Unity win (new seat)				
