= Gabriella Virágh =

Hungarian politician

Member of the National Assembly
- Assuming office 9 May 2026
- Succeeding: Csaba Tóth
- Constituency: Budapest 8th

Personal details
- Party: Tisza

Gabriella Virágh is a Hungarian politician who was elected member of the National Assembly in 2026 representing the Budapest 8th constituency. She previously worked as a physician.
