= Tünde Handó =

Hungarian jurist

Judge of the Constitutional Court
- Incumbent
- Assumed office 1 January 2020
- Preceded by: István Stumpf

President of the OBH
- In office 1 January 2012 – 30 November 2019
- Preceded by: András Baka as President of the Supreme Court
- Succeeded by: György Barna Senyei

Personal details
- Born: 1 May 1962 (age 64) Salgótarján, Hungarian People's Republic
- Spouse: József Szájer (m. 1983)
- Children: 1
- Education: Eötvös Loránd University

Tünde Handó (born 1 May 1962) is a Hungarian jurist and judge, who served as the inaugural President of the OBH (National Judiciary Office) from 1 January 2012 to 30 November 2019. On 1 January 2020, she replaced István Stumpf as a member of the Constitutional Court of Hungary.

== Early career ==
Handó graduated from the Faculty of Law of Eötvös Loránd University in 1986. She had been a member of the Bibó István College from 1983 to 1986. She married József Szájer – vice-president of Fidesz and Member of the European Parliament – in 1983. Their child Fanni was born in 1987.

Handó was a court drafter in the Metropolitan Labor Court, before becoming a court secretary. She was appointed judge on 1 May 1991 and President of the Metropolitan Labor Court on 15 April 1999. She has also been a lecturer in the labor department of ELTE's Faculty of Law since January 1999. Honorary county court judge since 15 July 2003, she has been a member of the exam-committee of the Metropolitan Court and the Law Exam Commission since 1999. She has also been Vice-president of the National Association of Labor Judges since 2000 and member of the Hungarian Labor Law Society since 2008. She became Chairperson of the Association of European Labor Judges in 2008.

== President of the National Judiciary Office (OBH) ==
Handó's appointment as President of the National Judiciary Office (OBH) faced criticism because of her connections to Fidesz politicians and because her husband, József Szájer is one of the key designers of the transformations in public law introduced by the second Viktor Orbán administration. MSZP members of the committee objected that the nomination process was a “shameful farce” in which the constitutional committee supported the nomination of the wife of József Szájer.

=== Relocation of the Budapest Transit Authority (BKV) case ===
The court began to operate in January 2012. Handó appointed Sándor Fazekas as President of the Metropolitan Tribunal on 5 January. An indictment against the Budapest Transit Authority (BKV) was lodged before the Metropolitan Tribunal on 11 January 2012 according to the court registry. On 17 January (a few days after his appointment) Fazekas immediately began to use the new act to propose to Handó the relocation of the case. Not much later, the Metropolitan Tribunal announced the initiation of the process of relocating the BKV case. According to the data published on the OBH website, Tünde Handó issued the presidential recommendation on 20 February 2012 to collect the criteria to be considered for the relocation processes. Regardless of this, Tünde Handó had already decided on the relocation of the BKV case on 16 February without any criterial system or chance to appeal.

Tünde Handó as President of OBH appointed the Kecskemét Tribunal to hear the case at the first instance level where the trial began before the summer holiday and according to the court's report it was to end in 18–24 months. The decision in the first instance was to be announced in the final campaign sprint of the next ordinary national elections and/or the municipal election.

This has not been the only case in which a trial at Kecskemét Tribunal ends in a period when the timing serves the best interest of Fidesz. In the case of János Zuschlag that tribunal delivered the decision of the first instance in March 2010, at the height of the national parliamentary elections campaign After Zuschlag, Miklós Hagyó’s case was also landed at Kecskemét Tribunal. Answering a journalist's question about “what are you doing in order to avoid even the pretense of political prejudice in Miklós Hagyó-case?” the Kecskemét Tribunal replied as follows in a news conference: “We are not doing anything. Nothing in an administrative way. Neither the chairman of the tribunal nor any of its leaders may interfere in the decision of the appointed judge. (…) Administratively the only thing we can and must do is deliver a decision in a reasonable time. The judge is totally independent, separate and delivers the decision only on the basis of his or her conscience, conviction and the law.” The father of Szabolcs Sárközi – spokesman of the tribunal – is a Fidesz politician in Kecskemét.

According to the official rationale, the reason for the relocation was that the Metropolitan Tribunal was so overloaded that it could not have judged this case – in which a socialist politician was involved – in a timely way. The ratio of special cases at Metropolitan Tribunal is 60% whereas at Kecskemét Tribunal it is 56%

Many criticisms have been made about Handó and the OBH regulation granting her the right to appoint a judge. Miklós Hagyó and his accused associates turned to the Constitutional Court and the European Court of Human Rights against the decision of Tünde Handó arguing that constitutional fundamental rights were infringed in relocating the case.

Defense held that the right to ensure justice was infringed since the relocation happened arbitrarily and without objectivity and transparency. Defense added that the obligation of impartiality was also infringed since the relocation was signed by the President of OBH, who is also wife of József Szájer and the appointed court had already delivered a serious decision in Zuschlag-case in similar political context. Furthermore, the right to legal remedy was also infringed since the law failed to provide effective legal remedy against the decision on appointing another judge – as the brief contains. Although the Constitutional Court considered the possibility of the relocation of the cases as being against the Fundamental Law, the 2/3rd majority in the parliament helped the government to include it in the articles of the Fundamental Law. Constitutional Court declared it unconstitutional.– Despite this decision, the case remained in Kecskemét.

The Hungarian Helsinki Committee and the Hungarian Civil Liberties Union are extremely concerned about the regulation which enables the President of OHB to appoint a judge and court against the law in order to hear the case and these organizations called the president not to grant such requests in the future.

=== Constitutional Court hearing ===
The Constitutional Court heard Tünde Handó on 23 April 2013, during the judging of the constitutional complaint lodged in BKV-case. President of OBH said in a news conference that she asked for a hearing at Const. Court in order to clarify the misunderstandings and errors. Miklós Hagyó wanted to be there at the hearing. Defense requested the publicity of the hearing in vain.

She was heard behind closed doors, without public against which the Eötvös Károly Institute, the Hungarian Helsinki Committee and the Hungarian Civil Liberties Union were protesting. They believe that the fact that the Const.Court heard the President of OBH in closed session infringed the right to fair trial, the right to know publicly the decision process of the public authority and the right to free access to information of public interest. The Const.Court ignoring the protestations encrypted the record of the hearing to 10 years. On 2 December 2013 after 224 days passed the Constitutional Court established again that the relocation of cases is against the Fundamental Law and also breaches international conventions. According to the standpoint of the Const.Court they worked on this case as they wanted to subject the consequences other pending proceedings too. OBH interpreted the decision just on the contrary meaning that the decision shall not affect pending cases. Handó's OBH declared not to interfere with the judiciary's business: It is the acting judge who can decide the effect of the Const.Court's decision on the pending case. Besides, Handó defended the independence of the judiciary

Kecskemét Tribunal established its incompetence in its decision of 16 December 2013 and so it relocated the BKV-case to the Metropolitan Tribunal

Hagyó had won a lawsuit in Strasbourg when Handó was heard by the Const.Court. According to the decision of the European Court of Human Rights the Hungarian authorities infringed many laws by keeping him in such conditions. Mária Szívós as Chairperson of the counsel of the Metropolitan Court confirmed the pre-trial detention of Hagyó three times, automatically, without critic on the basis of a police report which never existed. Furthermore, Szívós ordered more severe coercive measures against Hagyó’s accused associates (e.g. Ottó L., Éva H. and Miklós R.).

“Handó’s mandate commenced on 1 January 2012 and lasts for nine years; she promised a more transparent and efficient judiciary operation for her term.”

== Sources ==
- The Guardian: Meet Tünde Handó

- Handó Tünde - Hungarian Wikipedia
