= András Nemény =

Hungarian jurist and politician

Mayor of Szombathely
- Incumbent
- Assumed office 14 October 2019
- Preceded by: Dr. Tivadar Puskás

Member of the National Assembly
- In office 14 May 2010 – 5 May 2014

Personal details
- Born: 7 June 1976 (age 49) Szombathely, Hungary
- Party: MSZP (2000–2025)
- Children: 2
- Profession: jurist, politician

András Nemény (born 7 June 1976) is a Hungarian jurist and politician, member of the National Assembly from the Hungarian Socialist Party's National List between 2010 and 2014, the mayor of Szombathely since 2019.

Nemény was a member of the Parliamentary Committee on Consumer Protection between 14 May and 1 June 2010. He was appointed a member of the Committee on Employment and Labour on 14 May 2010, holding the position until 5 May 2014.

In the 2018 Hungarian parliamentary elections, he was 17th on the joint national list of MSZP and Dialogue Party, and he was again able to run against Csaba Hende in Vas County constituency 1, but this time he was defeated and did not get into the Parliament.

In early April 2025 he left MSZP.
