= Tivadar Puskás (politician) =

Hungarian politician

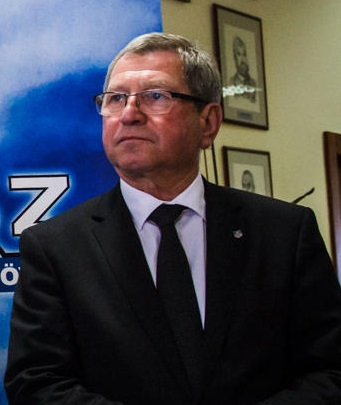

Mayor of Szombathely
- In office 3 October 2010 – 13 October 2019
- Preceded by: György Ipkovich
- Succeeded by: Dr. András Nemény

Member of the National Assembly
- In office 16 May 2006 – 5 May 2014

Personal details
- Born: 16 August 1952 (age 73) Veszprém, Hungary
- Party: KDNP
- Spouse: Katalin Mikó
- Children: 2
- Profession: physician

Tivadar Puskás (born 16 August 1952) is a Hungarian physician, who served as the mayor of Szombathely from 2010 to 2019. He was elected member of the National Assembly (MP) for Szombathely (Vas County Constituency I) in the 2010 parliamentary election. He was also MP from the Vas County Regional List of the Fidesz–Christian Democratic People's Party (KDNP) between 2006 and 2010.
