= Váci Mihály Kollégium =

School in Hungary

Information
- Website: vacimkoll.hu

Váci Mihály Kollégium is a school located in Zugló district, Budapest, Hungary.
