= György Ipkovich =

Hungarian politician

Mayor of Szombathely
- In office 20 October 2002 – 3 October 2010
- Preceded by: Gábor Szabó
- Succeeded by: Dr. Tivadar Puskás

Member of the National Assembly
- In office 25 April 2005 – 5 May 2014

Personal details
- Born: 17 March 1954 (age 72) Szombathely, Hungary
- Party: MSZMP; MSZP (since 1989)
- Profession: Jurist

György Ipkovich (born 17 March 1954) is a Hungarian jurist, who served as the mayor of Szombathely from 2002 to 2010. He was elected member of the National Assembly (MP) from the Vas County Regional List of the Hungarian Socialist Party (MSZP) in 2005.

== Studies and work experience ==
Ipkovich completed his primary studies at hometown. He finished Nagy Lajos Secondary Grammar School at Pécs in 1972. In 1973 he has been admitted to the Faculty of Law of Eötvös Loránd University (ELTE). Between 1973 and 1974 he did his military service in Kalocsa. He took a degree in 1979. From 1974, he was a member of Lawyer-student Committee of the college, then was a secretary until 1979. In this period the movement of boarder began in the university. In 1979, he got a job at the public prosecutor's office in Szombathely, where obtained a special examination.

After he worked for the Vas County's main-public prosecutor's office last as a juvenile prosecutor until 1990. He changed job after depolitical of prosecutor's organization. First he was a legal adviser, then found a lawyer office. He practiced as a lawyer until 2002, his specializations are economy-and criminal law. He is a member of presidium of Vas County's Lawyer Chamber.

== Political career ==
He was a member of Hungarian Socialist Workers' Party (MSZMP). He is a founding member of Hungarian Socialist Party (MSZP) since 1989. From 1990 he was a member of the party's presidium in Vas County.

In the 1990 parliamentary election he was placed fourth. In the autumn he was only local representative of MSZP in the General Assembly of Szombathely and he was a chairman of the Social Committee. In the 1994 and 1998 he was a local representative from the party's regional list. Between 1994 and 2002 he was a chairman of the Crime-prevention and Public Security Committee. In consequence of his local political career lasting twelve years he is a trustee of the Welfare Foundation of Szombathely, was a member of Supervisory Board of Savaria Historical Carnival Foundation, was a founding vice-president of Savaria Legio Traditionalist Association. On 20 October 2002, he was elected mayor of Szombathely with 51% of the votes as a common candidate of MSZP-SZDSZ.

In 1994 he was an individual candidate, in 2002 he was a regional list candidate in the parliamentary elections. He was an alternate member of Committee of the Regions on behalf of the Hungarian Government. On 21 April 2005, he became an MP from the party's county regional list, replacing Gyula Pusztai, who died in office. He took his oath on 25 April. In the 2006 parliamentary election he obtained a mandate from Vas County Regional List. He was appointed a member of the Local Government and Urban Development Committee on 30 May 2006. He was re-elected in 2010 and became a member of the Constitutional, Judicial and Standing Orders Committee. He unsuccessfully ran for the position of mayor of Szombathely as a candidate of the MSZP, DK, Együtt left-wing parties and "Éljen Szombathely" local organization in the 2014 local elections, defeated by incumbent mayor Tivadar Puskás with only 560 votes. However he was elected to the town's general assembly.
