= Zugló =

14th District of Budapest

14th District of Budapest Budapest XIV. kerülete Zugló
- District of Budapest
- District XIV
- Flag Coat of arms

- Location of District XIV in Budapest (shown in grey)
- Coordinates: 47°31′N 19°07′E
- Country: Hungary
- Region: Central Hungary
- City: Budapest
- Established: 15 June 1935
- Quarters: List: Alsórákos; Istvánmező; Herminamező; Kiszugló; Nagyzugló; Rákosfalva; Törökőr; Városliget

Government
  - Mayor: András Rózsa (Momentum)

Area
  - Total: 18.13 km^{2} (7.00 sq mi)
  - Rank: 14th

Population (2016)
  - Total: 124,841
  - Rank: 3rd
  - Density: 6,886/km^{2} (17,830/sq mi)
- Demonym: tizennegyedik kerületi ("14th districter")
- Time zone: UTC+1 (CET)
  - Summer (DST): UTC+2 (CEST)
- Postal code: 1141 ... 1149
- Website: www.zuglo.hu

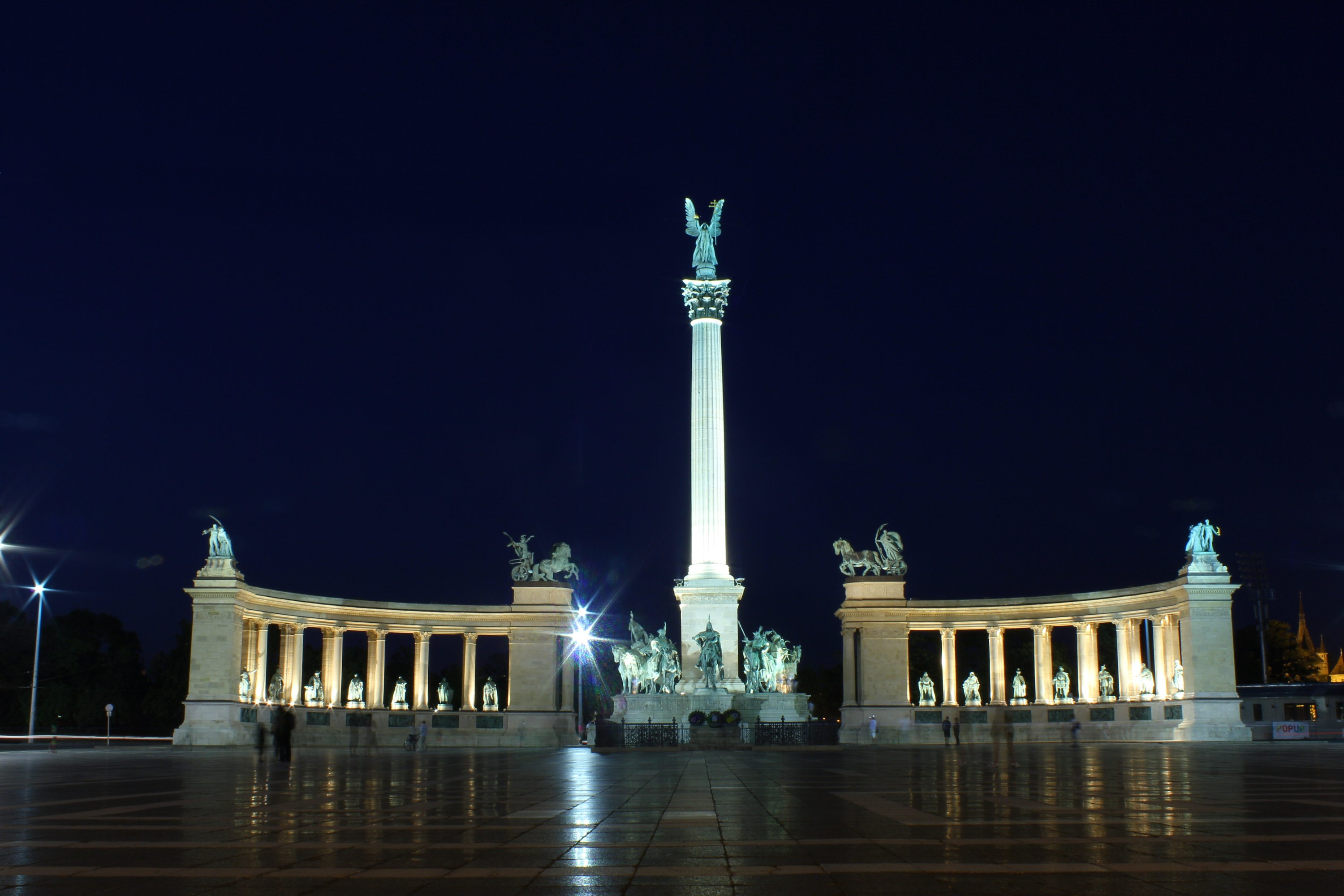
Millennium Monument on Heroes' Square

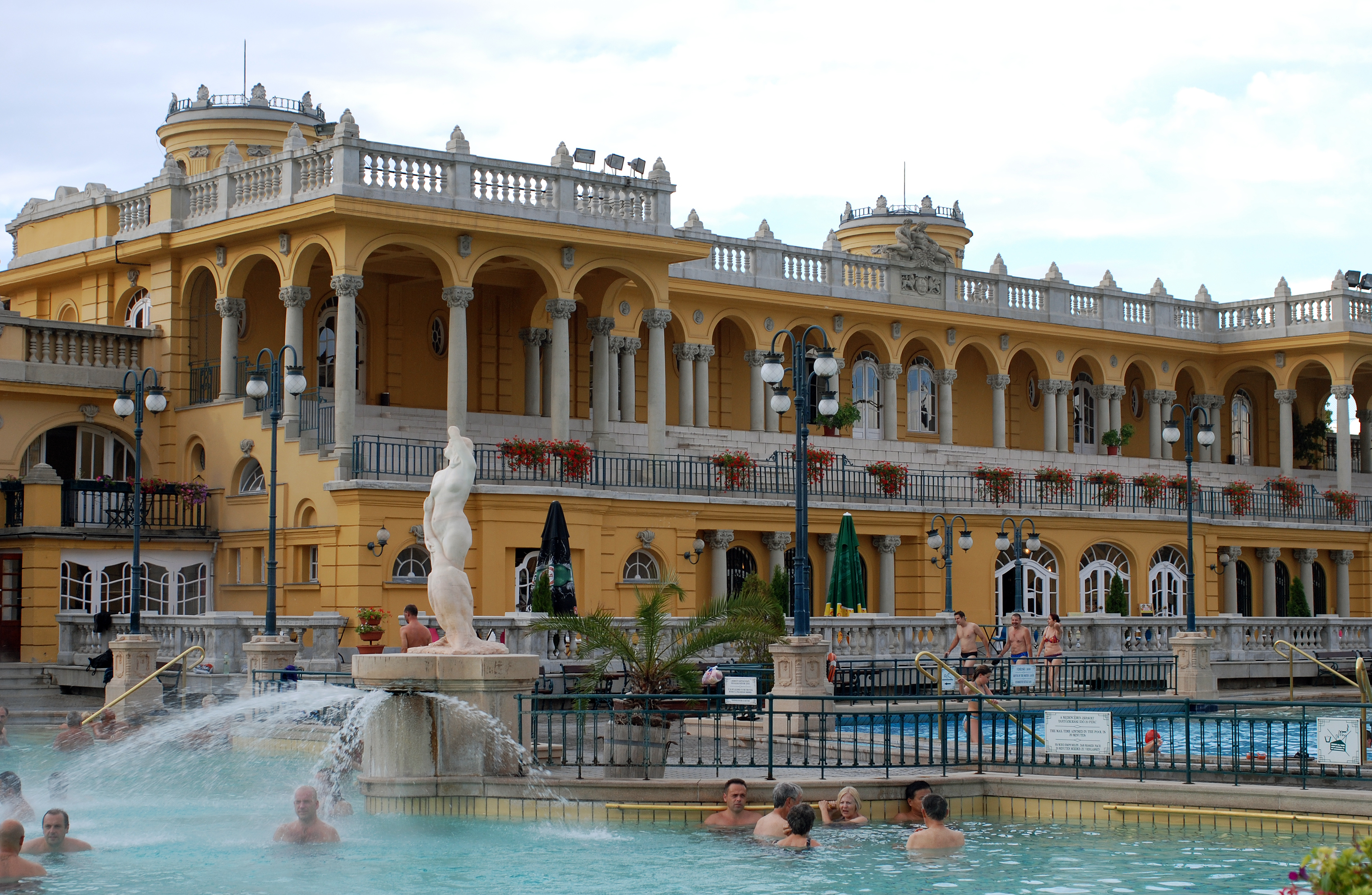
Széchenyi Baths

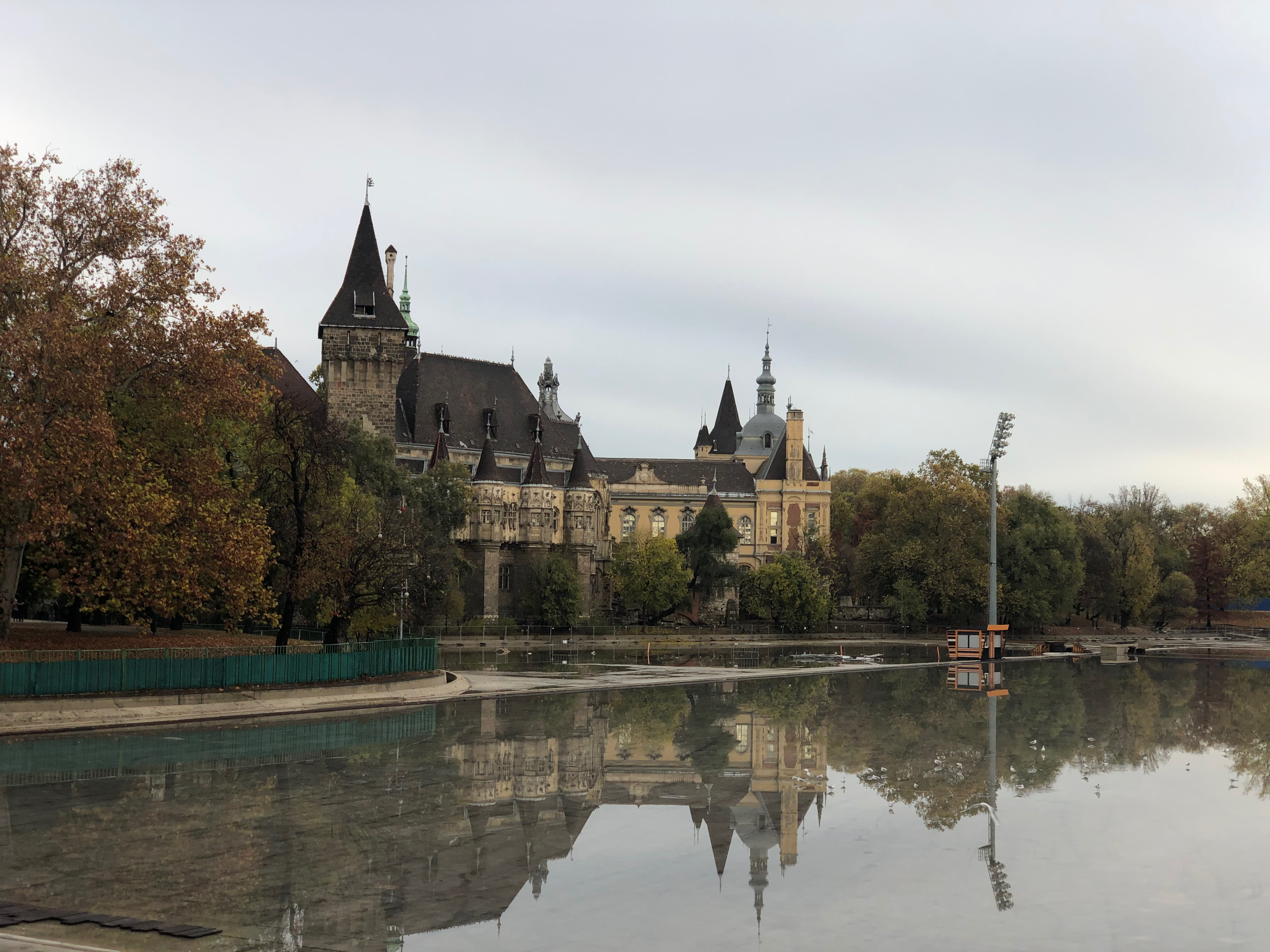
Vajdahunyad Castle

Zugló (German: Lerchenfeld, Macedonian: Сугел, Serbian: Зугло/Zuglo) is the 14th District of Budapest, Hungary

== Geography ==
- Area 18.15 km^{2}
- Inhabitants: 130,000

Access to the district is easy; the southern end is easily accessible via the main M2 subway line, with its terminal station being the largest hub in the city at the border with Kőbánya. The northern part is accessible via the old M1 subway line.

== History ==
Parts of Rákosmező is thought to be part of Zugló now; this was the ground for the inauguration process for the king at times in Hungarian history dating back to the 13th century. The development of the area started in the middle of the 19th century as Pest expanded. The subway (the first subway in continental Europe outside London) reached the district at the end of the 19th century. The first mansions were built around the City Park.

As the city expanded, the suburban district quickly found itself fairly central in the city, and larger houses started to appear in certain areas. The Communist era brought large developments of pre-fab housing projects into some areas of the district, but large parts of the district still maintain the suburban feeling; and some areas even retained the glamour of the mansions built at the turn of the century.

== Demographics ==
Zugló is considered to be amongst the 'nicest' and safest districts of the Pest side of the city, which also means that in most areas of the district, people are somewhat better off than the average of their class, meaning the block buildings are cleaner, houses are nicer, etc.

Zugló is a mixture of middle and working-class people. Occasionally non-European immigrants can also be seen in Zugló. The district is favored for its good transportation, safety and for being clean as well.

The district sees considerable new development of condos and is a popular destination of young middle-class families.

== Education ==
- Váci Mihály Kollégium

== Sport ==
- Budapesti AK, defunct association football team
- Budapesti VSC, sports team
- BVSC (men's water polo)
- Budapesti Postás SE, sports team
- FőTAXI SC, defunct association football team
- Turul FC, defunct association football team
- Zuglói AC, defunct association football team
- Zuglói SE, defunct association football team

== List of mayors ==
Member	Party	Date
Zsuzsanna Kardos	SZDSZ	1990–2002
Gábor Rátonyi	Fidesz	2002–2006
Leonárd Weinek	SZDSZ	2006–2010
Ferenc Papcsák	Fidesz	2010–2014
Gergely Karácsony	PM	2014–2019
Csaba Horváth	MSZP	2019–2024
András Rózsa	Momentum	2024–

== District Assembly ==
Party	Seats	Current District Assembly
Fidesz-KDNP	6	
DK	5	
Momentum	4	M
CZE	2	
MKKP	2	
Mi Hazánk	1	
Összefogás Zuglóért	1	

== Gallery ==
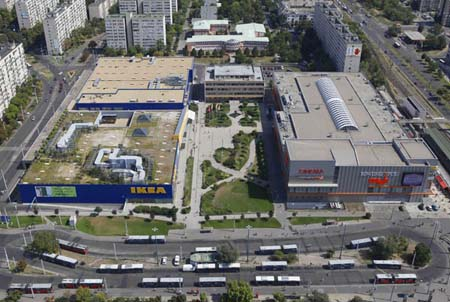

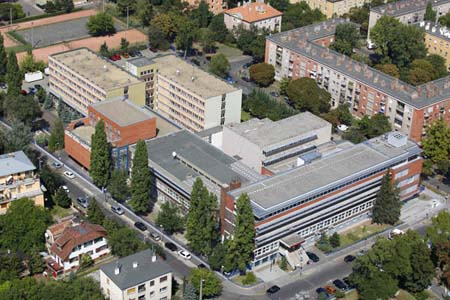

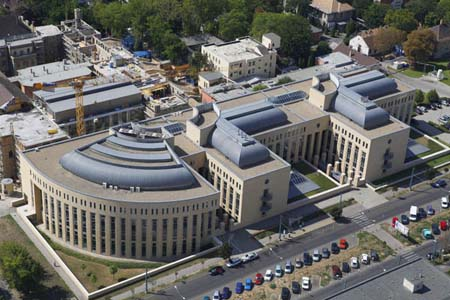

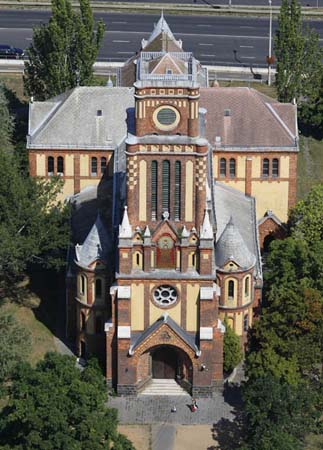

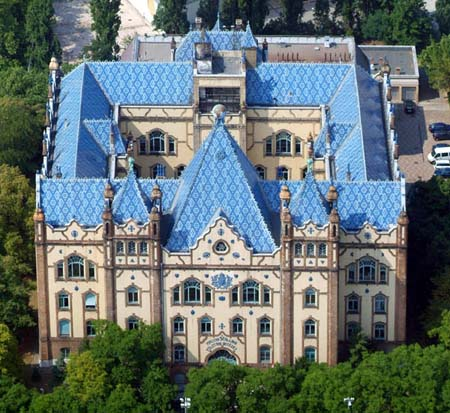

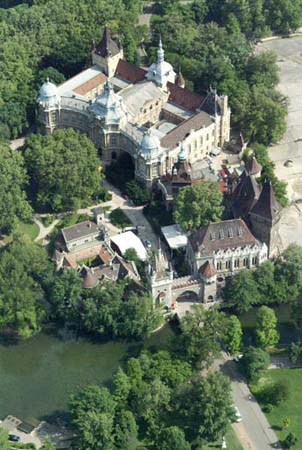

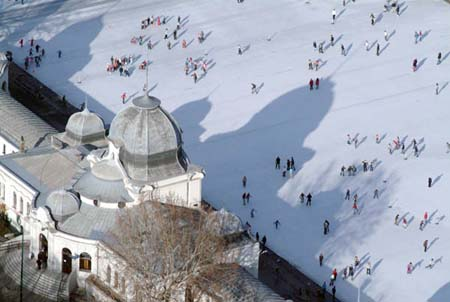

== Sightseeing ==
- Városliget (City Park) is located in Zugló, with a number of museums and attractions.

== Notable people ==
- László Schell, grew up in Zugló.

== See also ==
- List of districts in Budapest

== Twin towns – sister cities ==
- Miercurea Ciuc, Romania, since 1995
- Racoș, Romania, since 2000
- Racibórz, Poland, since 2008
- Steglitz-Zehlendorf (Berlin), Germany, since 2008
- Cholpon-Ata, Kyrgyzstan, since 2011
- Ciceu, Romania, since 2011
- Veliko Tarnovo, Bulgaria, since 2013
- Opava, Czech Republic, since 2019
- Grosuplje, Slovenia, since 2023
- Clarksville, United States of America, since 2023
- Ordu, Turkey, since 2025
- Gradsko, North Macedonia, since 2025
- Tsetserleg, Mongolia, since 2025
- Muttrah, Oman, since 2025
- Đala, Serbia, since 2026
- Ipoh, Malaysia, since 2026
- Zaventem, Belgium, since 2026
- Jennersdorf, Austria, since 2026
