= Miklós Hagyó =

Hungarian entrepreneur and politician

Deputy Mayor of Budapest
- In office 2006–2009 Serving with Mayor Gábor Demszky

Member of Parliament from Budapest List
- In office May 16, 2006 – May 13, 2010
- Prime Minister: Ferenc Gyurcsány: June 9, 2006 - resigned April 14, 2009; Gordon Bajnai: April 14, 2009 – May 29, 2010

Member of Parliament from National List
- In office May 15, 2002 – May 15, 2006
- Prime Minister: Péter Medgyessy: May 27, 2002 – resigned September 29, 2004; Ferenc Gyurcsány: September 29, 2004 – June 9, 2006

Personal details
- Born: July 20, 1967 (age 58)
- Citizenship: Hungarian
- Party: Hungarian Socialist Party
- Spouse: Beáta Csecserits
- Children: Dorina
- Occupation: Entrepreneur, Politician
- Website: http://www.hagyomiklos.com

Miklós Hagyó (Hungarian pronunciation: hɒɟoː mikloːʃ; born July 20, 1967) is a Hungarian entrepreneur and politician, a former deputy mayor of Budapest and a former member of the Hungarian parliament. From 1998 until 2010, Hagyó was active in the Hungarian Socialist Party. Immediately following the April 2010 elections, when Hagyó lost his seat, he was arrested on suspicion of extortion and breach of fiduciary responsibility. The trial against Hagyó and 14 other suspects is currently underway in Kecskemét.

== Education ==
In 1989, Hagyó earned a bachelor's degree in Product Engineering from the former Budapest University of Horticulture and Food Industry in Szeged, Hungary. After the undergraduate studies, he relocated to the university's Budapest campus in pursuit of an advanced degree in Food Engineering from the Department of Economics. Hagyó claimed that he subsequently pursued doctoral work in the subject matter, but he was forced to abandon the academic project due to "political and personal life difficulties". Hagyó did however co-author a published scientific investigation into the "conditions of the food retail trade units in Hungary".

== Career ==
=== Private Sector ===
Resulting from the fall of the Iron Curtain in 1989, and the subsequent transition to a market economy, Hungary saw a significant increase in foreign investment and trade after 1991. Taking advantage of that, Hagyó began working in 1992 for Wrigley's Hungarian operation, Hungaria. After working his way into an exclusive regional distribution position, Hagyó became involved in many start-up food distribution companies. According to him, he enjoyed financial growth and professional success "thanks to the [post-Soviet] economic boom."

=== Politics ===
In 1998, Hagyó became a member of the Hungarian Socialist Party, citing Gyula Horn's "personality and role" as his attraction toward politics.

Four years later, Hagyó was one of 178 socialists elected to the National Assembly, thus granting him the title Member of Parliament. Thereafter he served as the party's president of district XII in Budapest, which placed him on the party's national board. At various moments between July 2002 until May 2006, Hagyó was active in various parliamentary committees: Joint EU Institutions Committee, Regional Development Committee, Environmental Committee, and Foreign Affairs Committee. Also during that time, he delivered three speeches in Parliament, and he submitted a total of 55 independent and non autonomous motions.

In 2005, acting as the party's chairman for nationwide charitable activities, he and Dr. Lajos Oláh organized Hope for Transylvania. With the help of the Hungarian Red Cross, they collected and delivered food, medicine, tents, blankets, and other emergency supplies to residents in the severely flooded region. Moreover, he helped secure substantial funds from the Hungarian Red Cross in an effort to transport many of the victims to Hungary while the damaged communities were restored.

Due to the social unrest of a 2006 scandal involving former Socialist Prime Minister Ferenc Gyurcsány, many thought that opposing Fidesz representatives would oust the socialists from their seats in Budapest. Despite that, the Alliance of Free Democrats-Socialist coalition incumbent Gábor Demszky was re-elected. In addition to holding his parliamentary position, Hagyó was appointed as Deputy Mayor of Budapest on December 14, 2006. As Deputy Mayor, Hagyó wield political oversight over the city's urban and asset management responsibilities.

During his second parliamentary term, Hagyó was active in the following committees between May 2006 and June 2007: Economic and Information Technology Commission, the Commission's Energy Subcommittee and the Enterprise Research and Development Subcommittee. Also during that allotted time, he made three speeches to Parliament, and he submitted a total of 15 independent and joint motions.

As a member of the Hungarian Olympic Committee, Hagyó was elected President of the Hungarian Synchronized Swimming Association (MSZSZ) in 2007 after the resignation of the previous president, Csaba Haranghy. In a 2010 interview, MSZSZ Secretary General Laszló Szimandl stated in an interview:

Mr. Miklós Hagyó greatly helped over the last two years...He provided the financial backing, thanks to which we were able to provide a coach from abroad for training sessions, and were able to organize professional training camps for our national team. We finally had the background support for our professional sport achievements.

At that time, Hagyó was forced to resign from the socialist party and its associated position. He therefore was unable to remain the president of the synchronized swimming association.

According to promotional videos, his pride of his Jászberény heritage - an ethnically mixed community due to historical wars - and his recognition of Roma soldiers, Hagyó is a supporter of ethnic diversity. During a March 2008 speech recognizing the efforts of Jews and Roma in the 1848 revolution, Hagyó reminded his Hungarian audience that the history of the Serbs, the Croatians, and the Poles are regrettably more known than that of the Romany soldiers.

Responding to the 2008 Tibetan unrest, Hagyó signed a denunciatory petition to promote Hungarian political support for the Tibetans. While doing so, he urged all politician to come forth with support despite political affiliation. Moreover, Hagyó stated:

We do not consider it desirable to boycott the Olympic Games and vehemently reject any initiative of any country to boycott them, and we object to any country’s decision to forbid its athletes to attend the Games. However, the week’s ongoing events should make every responsibly thinking person consider protesting China’s behavior with regards to the Tibetans. Even though the Tibetan issue of dictatorial governance overshadows the Olympic Games, I sincerely hope that the scheduled summer Games will in no way be compromised, and that the Olympic Games, which bring a message of bravery and friendship, will bring peace and equality to all.

=== Budapest Transit Authority (BKV) ===
In 2009, BKV was investigated by city's police and the State Audit Office of Hungary because of an employee severance payment controversy. Many of BKV's upper management were interrogated concerning possible involvement.

Former BKV chief executive office Zsolt Balogh gave an interview to the daily newspaper Magyar Nemzet (Hungarian National) on March 6, 2010 and a separate interview the following day to HírTV. During the interviews, Balogh publicly accused Hagyó of extortion and breach of fiduciary duty. According to the accuser, he entered Hagyó's office "in late September, early October 2007" as the freshly promoted chief technology officer. Then and there, Balogh claimed, Hagyó dictated that Balogh must "be hard, because things must be done here, and who doesn't do it" will receive no mercy, and the throat "must be cut."

In the same two interviews, Balogh alleged that during a later meeting in Gödöllő, Hagyó demanded from Balogh an annual "membership fee" of 15 million forints which would need to be paid directly to Hagyó. Balogh admitted that the following day he obliged to the demand. In the March 6th interview, Balogh stated that he met Hagyó in the office of Ottó Lelovics, former public relations and communication consultant to BKV. Then and there he passed 15 million forints to Hagyó. Balogh stated that he knew "15 million fits in a Nokia box," so he hid the money inside a Nokia box designed for mobile phone packaging. As a result, this scandal has become known as the "Nokia Box Case" or the "Magic Box Case."

On March 7, 2010 the online Hungarian news site Index.hu reported that Hagyó resigned from his local and national positions in the Hungarian Socialist Party. In the same article, the party's spokesman, István Nyakó, stated that the accusations had "not been about the truth." Nyakó also explained that other socialist politicians did not want the scandal to hinder the party in the upcoming 2010 elections.

Immediately following the change of government on May 14, 2010, Hagyó was detained by police. In addition to the bribery accusations from Balogh, police suspected him of instructing former BKV managing director Attila Antal of concluding an unnecessary contract with AAM and misappropriating funds related to the suburban railway line HÉV passenger information supply system.

== Pretrial Detention ==
On May 26, 2010 Hagyó was incarcerated at the Budapest Penitentiary in spite of numerous appeals from Hagyó's lawyer, András Kádár. kadar argued that his client suffered from numerous illnesses and no evidence supported the stringent measure. The signatory judge, Mária Szívós, cited the necessity of the coercive measure as prevention from suspect collusion and prevention of Hagyo fleeing the country. Prior to this, Hagyó, via his lawyer, András Kádár, expressed willingness to cooperate in the ongoing investigation.

Hagyó's initial release date was June 17, 2010. The prosecution repeatedly proposed sentence extensions, which were approved by the Pest Central District Court and confirmed by the Municipal Court. Hagyó was released from prison into house arrest on February 13, 2011, and he remained on house arrest until June 8, 2011.

On September 6, 2010, 11 days before his release, pretrial detention, was again to be extended via order 28.AJC.No.1850/2010/2., Hagyó and Kádár filed application no.52624/10 with the European Court of Human Rights. In the application, they complained against validity of the pretrial detention and numerous prison conditions under Article 5 § 1 (c), Article 5 § 4 in conjunction with Article 13, Article 3, and Article 8 in conjunction with Article 13 of the European Convention on Human Rights. On April 23, 2013 the Court announced its decision, and in doing so they found that the Hungarian judicial system violating the articles associated with the complaint.

While supporters of Hagyó's detainment agreed that he needed to be detained before creating further damage, the judicial process through which the decisions were made to imprison Hagyó received much criticism. A Hungarian law student used the detainment and the subsequent trial as case studies, focusing on the issue of basic rights established by the Convention. The main points of his contention were the prosecution's and court's unwillingness to allow neither Hagyó nor his lawyer access to the evidences. which, according to the former bodies, necessitated an extended pretrial detention, especially when Hagyó suffered from deteriorating health.

As Hagyó was a young and popular socialist politician, some speculate that the detention and the trial have political, rather than criminal, motivations. This speculation stems from bloggers, academics, and journalists.

Critics of Hagyó consider him a relic of Soviet-imposed communism, a symbol of corruption.

=== Forgery Accusations ===
While serving his pretrial detention at the Budapest Penitentiary, Miklós Hagyó, with legal oversight from Dr. Viktor Géza Szűcs, empowered his common-law wife to act on his behalf with regards to Hagyó's company, WIRTASS Trade and Service, LLC. on August 6, 2010. After receiving the authorization of the trial's prosecutor, the document was sent along with a letter from Hagyó's common-law wife to Brigadier-General Csaba Boglyasovszky, the principal administrator of the Venyige Street Penal Enforcement Institution. In the letter, Hagyó's partner states that the new situation would require extraordinary visiting rights. She was previously allowed to visit Hagyó once a month. In her request (dated August 17, 2010), she states that "I would also like to record, that the actual mutual confidence alone is not sufficient to provide [for WIRTASS LLC.] adequate, objective and rational basis for decision making." She therefore requested rights for two separate visitations per month to be "at pre-announced times in accordance with the house rules of the penal enforcement institution." Principal Administrator Csaba Boglyasovszky positively replied to the request on August 19, 2010 and granted her a visitation on the 26th of August, 2010. In the letter, Boglyasovszky stated, "Referring to the letter dated on the 17th of August 2010. I inform you that for visiting Miklós Hagyó detainee, to you as the legal representative is allowed."

Prior to that, the television show Célpont aired by HírTV on March 21, 2010 allegedly showed material which were damaging to Miklós Hagyó and his partner. As a result, Hagyó filed a lawsuit against HírTV within the Budapest Regional Court. On August 6, 2010 Hagyó and Dr. Viktor Szűcs signed a document which granted Hagyó's common-law wife to act as his legal representative in the slander lawsuit. Hagyó presented this authorization to the prison via his counselor on September 2, 2010. The prosecution observed this and the fact that Hagyó's common-law wife lacked the necessary legal qualifications. They therefore filed misdemeanor forgery charges against Hagyó, his partner, and Dr. Szűcs.

All three persons were cleared of the charges by the Pest District Central Court on January 16, 2012.

== The trial ==
In 2016, Hagyo was found guilty of abuse of office, as well as financial malfeasance by a first-level court in Hungary. Miklos was cleared of charges of corruption, which prosecutors have decided to appeal.

The appeals court in 2017 handed him a sentence of one and a half year, a decision which was not positively assessed by the ruling FIDESZ party.

== Personal life ==
He is married to Beáta Csecserits. They have a daughter, Dorina.

Hagyó completed the pilgrimage on El Camino de Santiago.
