= Ferenc Papcsák =

Hungarian lawyer and politician

Mayor of Zugló District XIV, Budapest
- In office 3 October 2010 – 12 October 2014
- Preceded by: Leonárd Weinek
- Succeeded by: Gergely Karácsony

Member of the National Assembly
- In office 14 May 2010 – 5 August 2015
- In office 15 May 2002 – 15 May 2006

Personal details
- Born: 19 February 1966 (age 60) Nyíregyháza, Hungary
- Party: Fidesz (since 1997)
- Spouse: Eszter Szarvasy
- Children: Regő István; Margaréta Csenge
- Profession: lawyer, politician

Ferenc Papcsák (born 19 February 1966) is a Hungarian lawyer and politician, who served as Mayor of Zugló (District XIV, Budapest) from 2010 to 2014. Besides that he represented Zugló (Budapest Constituency XXI) in the National Assembly of Hungary between 2010 and 2014. He was also Member of Parliament for Baktalórántháza (Szabolcs-Szatmár-Bereg County Constituency V) between 2002 and 2006.

In 2010, Papcsák served as government accountability commissioner, whose role was to name former government officials who participated in economic decision-making which clearly damaged the country and taxpayers, and to take legal steps to hold those former officials accountable.

== Biography ==
Papcsák was born into a Greek Catholic family of six children from Szabolcs-Szatmár-Bereg County. He spent his childhood in Demecser.

He finished Vasvári Pál Vocational Technical School of Chemical Industry No. 115 at Tiszavasvári in 1983 as a skilled worker in chemicals and drug production. He worked for Chinoin Pharmaceutical Company in Budapest as a skilled worker in chemical and drug production from 1983 to 1987. Parallel to his job, as a part-time student, he finished Könyves Kálmán Secondary School at Újpest (District IV, Budapest) in 1986. He was admitted to the Faculty of Law of Eötvös Loránd University (ELTE) in 1987, where from he graduated in 1993. At university he was the chairman of the board of Bibó István Special college, until 1991. He was lawyer candidate from 1993 to 1996. He passed his bar examination in 1995, and he founded his own lawyer's office in Solymár in 1996, pursuing mainly economic law and legal counselling.

He was a member of the supervisory board of the State Privatisation and Property Management Company since 1998, and member of the managing board from May 2001. He was a member of the Hungarian Statistic Association from 1992, and he was a non-remunerated council member in the Pest County Bar Association since 2001. He has been a founding member of the Foundation for the Development of Rétköz and Central Szabolcs since 2001.

Papcsák was appointed Chairman of the Supervisory Board of the Hungarian National Bank (MNB) on 7 July 2015, as a result he resigned from his parliamentary seat.

== Personal life ==
Papcsák is married. His wife is Marianna dr. Vámos. They have a daughters, Margaréta Csenge, Zelina and a son, Regő István. His wife is an entrepreneur and landscape-gardener engineer. They live in a detached house in Rákosmente (District XVII, Budapest).
