= Budapest =

Capital and largest city of Hungary

- Capital city
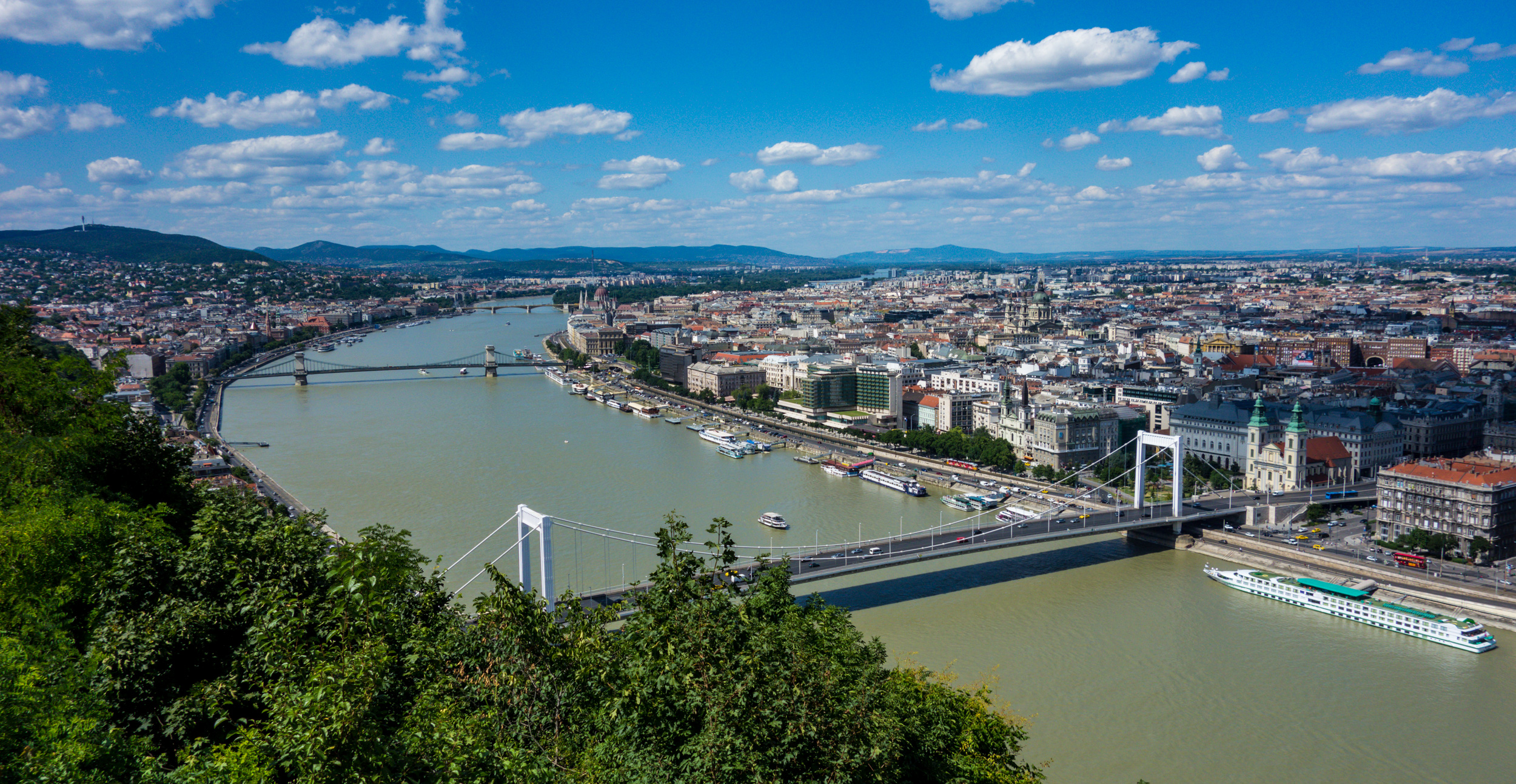
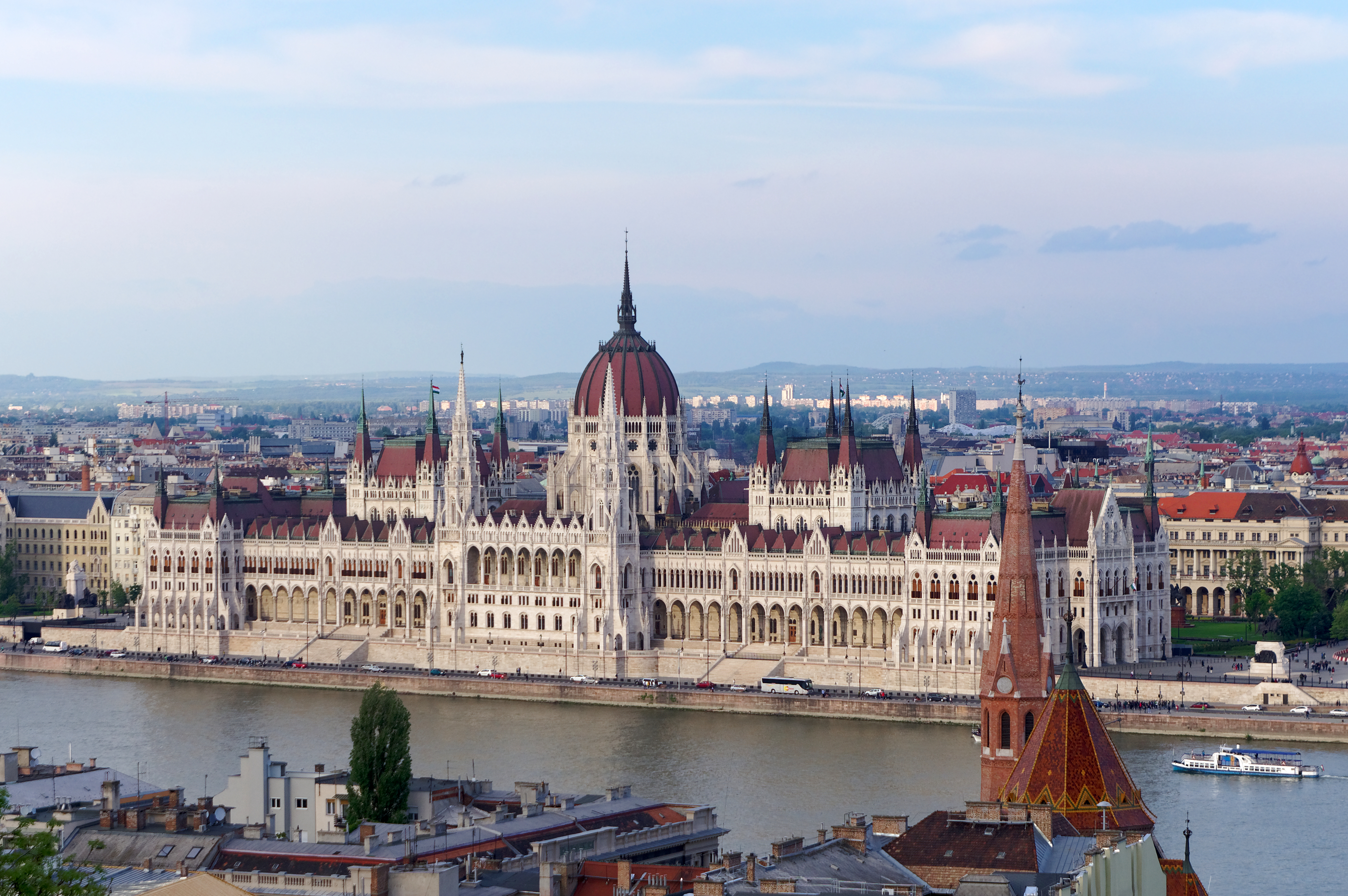
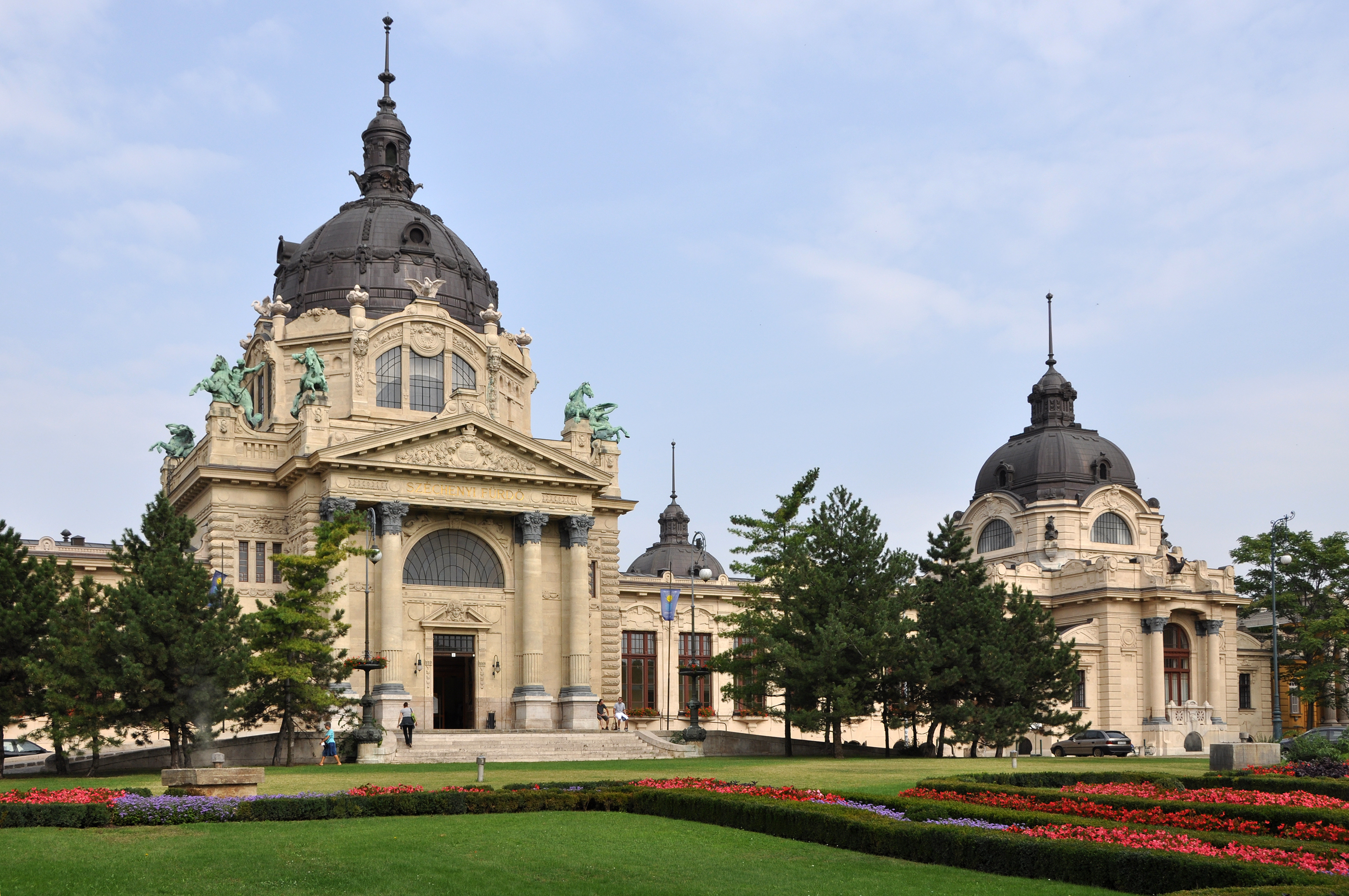
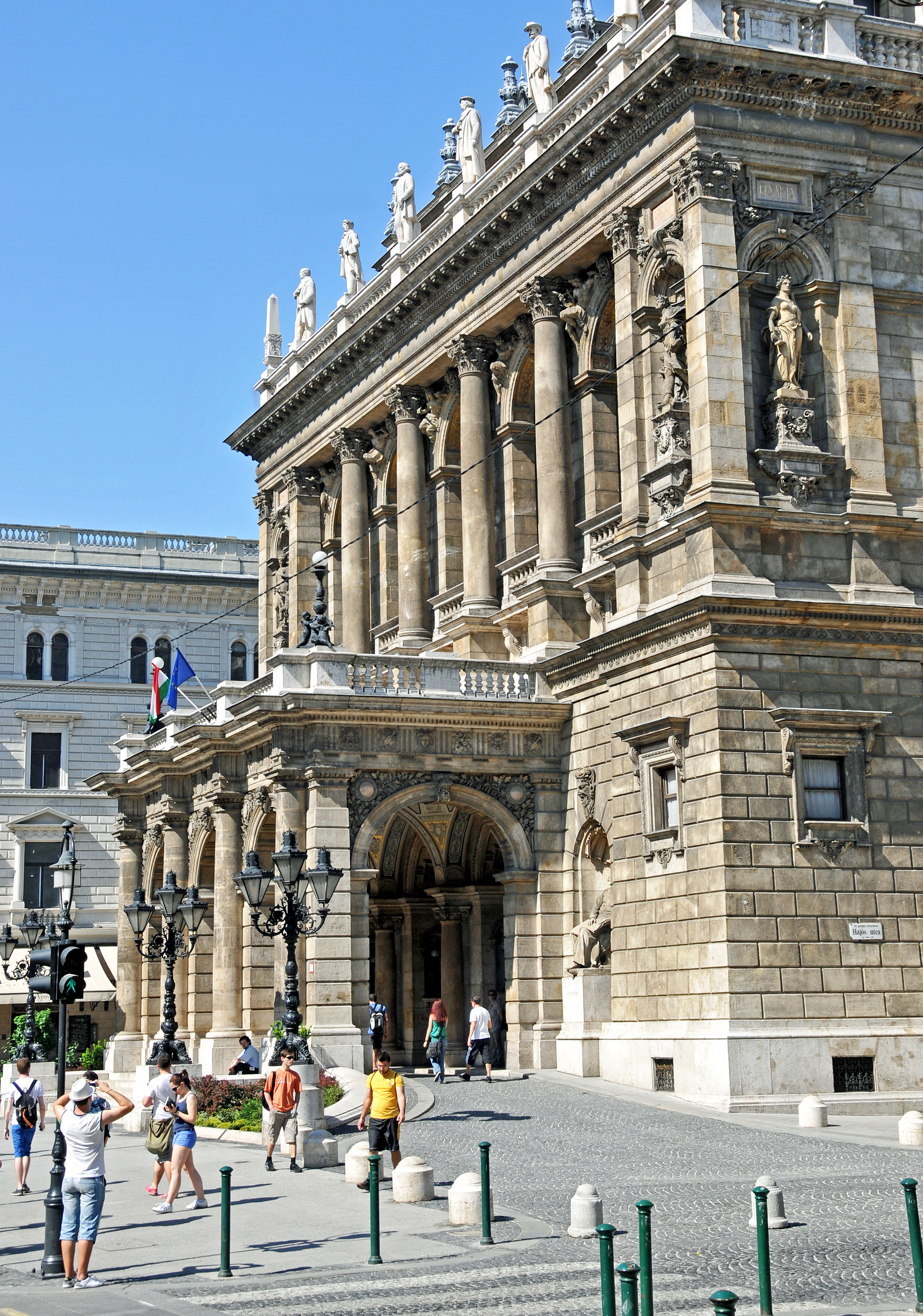
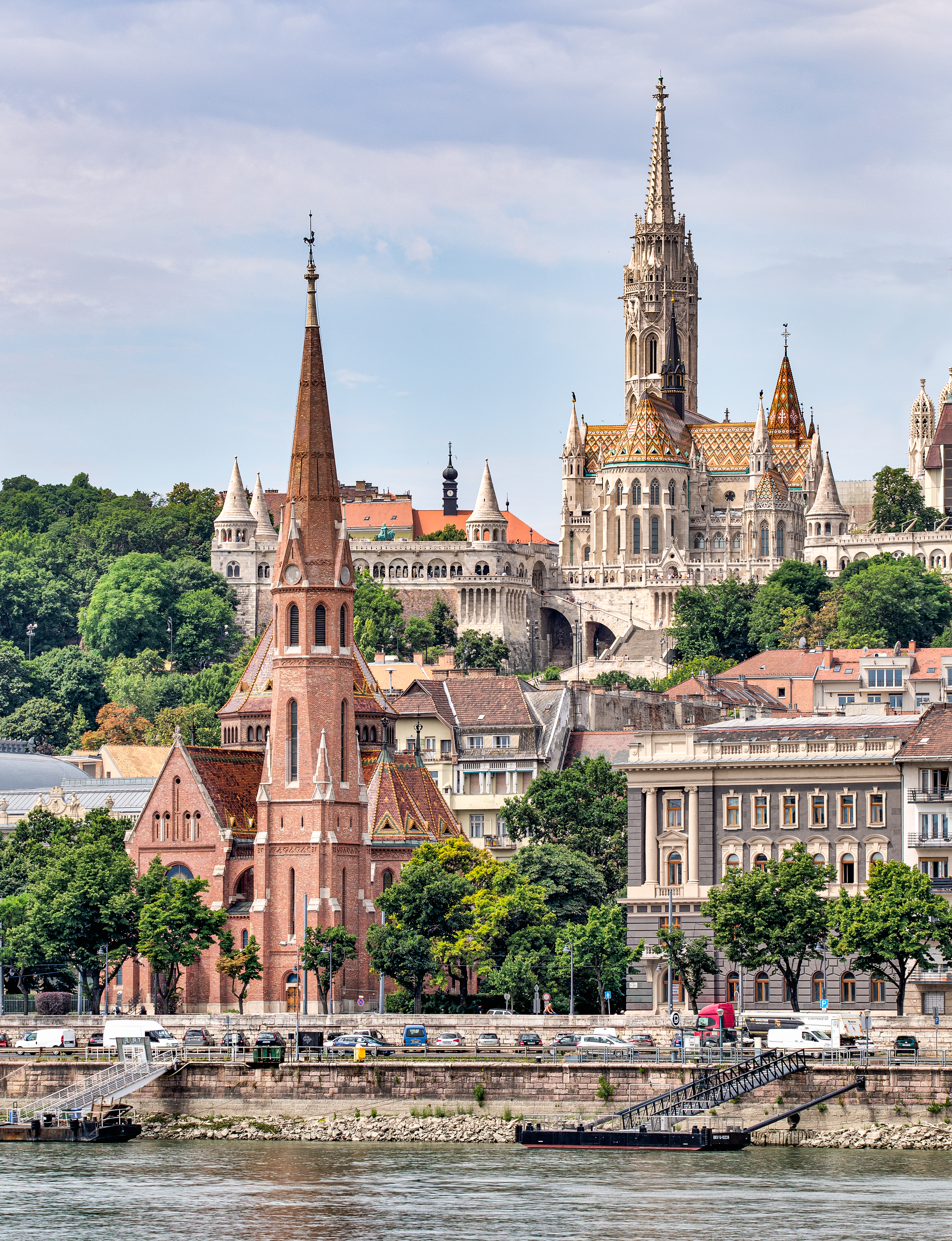
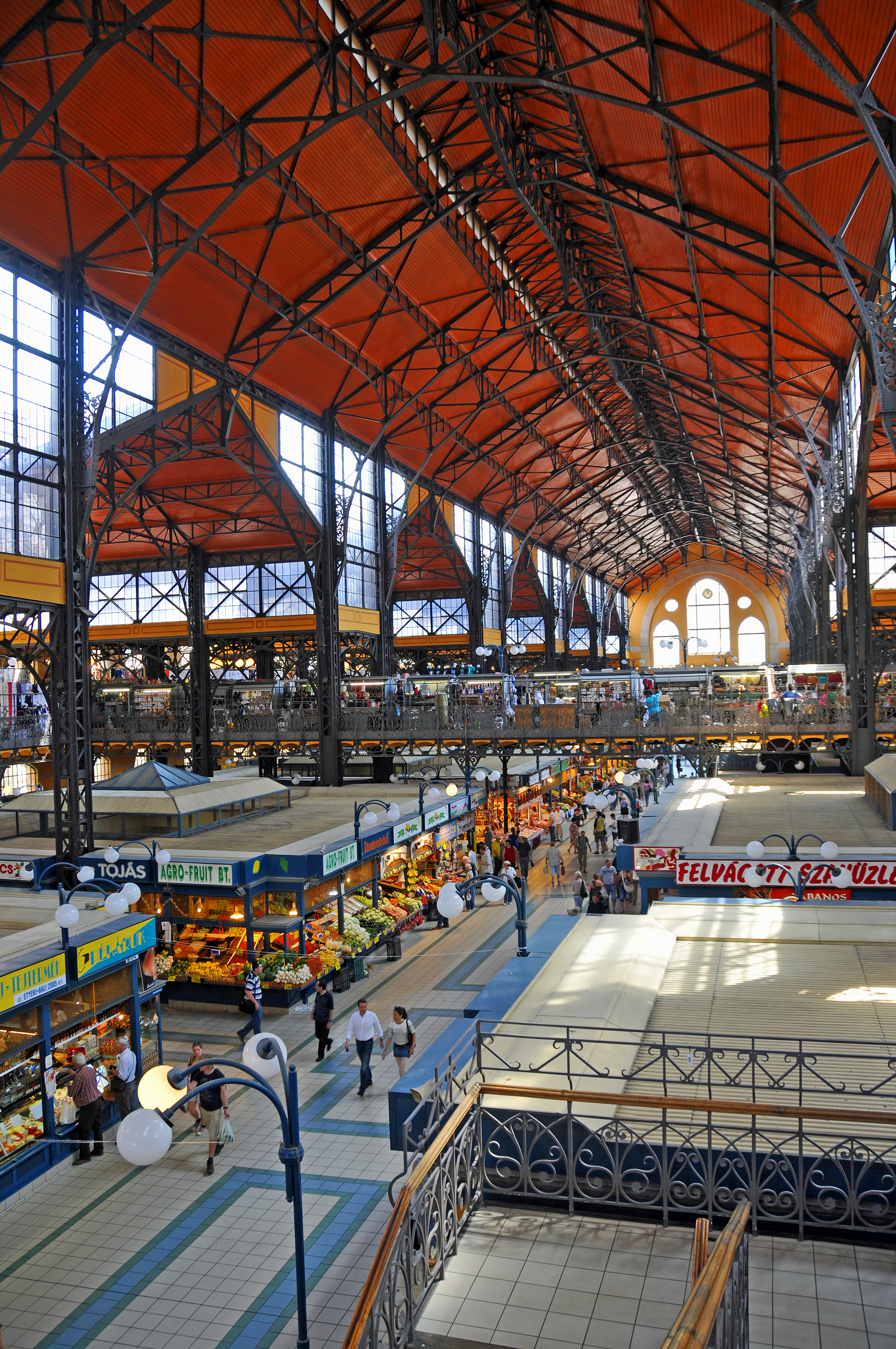
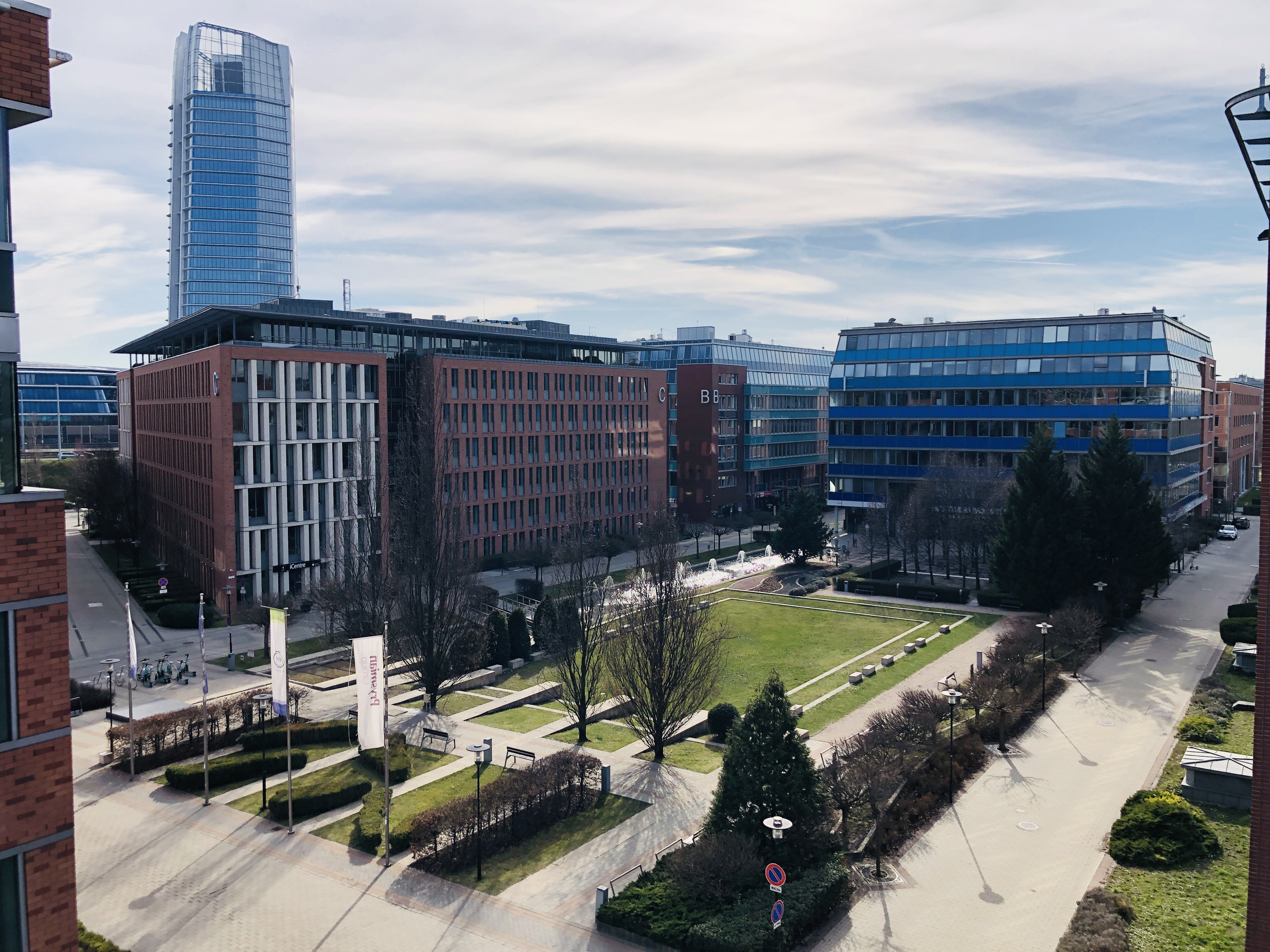
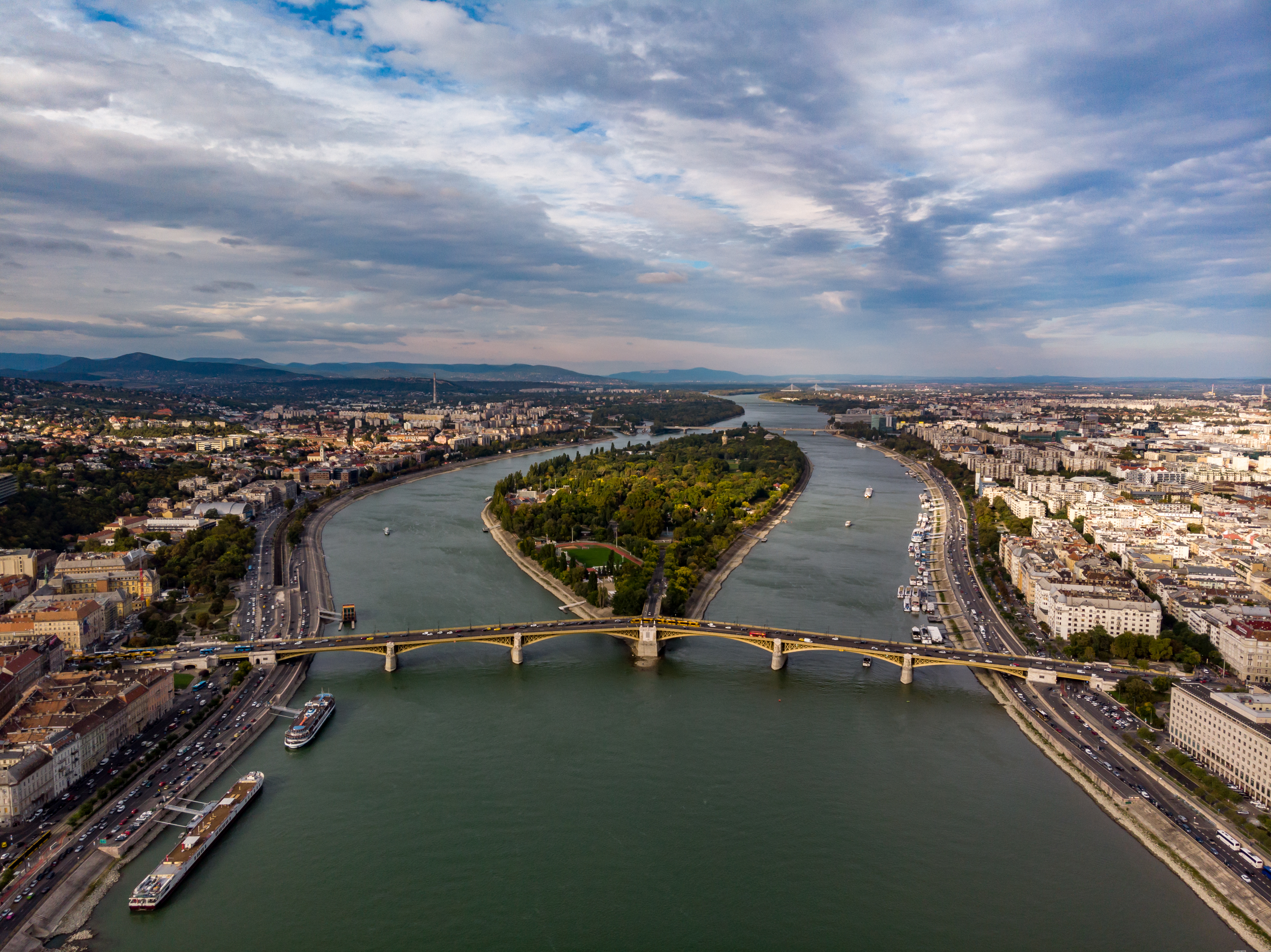
- Skyline with the Chain Bridge (background), the Elisabeth Bridge, Banks of Danube and Downtown of Pest from Gellért Hill Hungarian Parliament Széchenyi Thermal Bath Opera House on Andrássy Avenue Fisherman's Bastion with Matthias Church Great Market Hall on Váci Street Infopark science and business district Margaret Island and Margaret Bridge

- Flag Coat of arms Logo
- Nicknames: Queen of Danube, Capital of Spas, Heart of Europe, Paris of the East
- Interactive map of Budapest
- Location within Hungary Location within Europe
- Coordinates: 47°29′33″N 19°03′05″E
- Country: Hungary
- Settled by Romans: AD 41; 1985 years ago, as Aquincum
- Unification of Buda, Pest and Óbuda: 17 November 1873
- Boroughs: 23 districts: I., Várkerület; II.; III., Óbuda-Békásmegyer; IV., Újpest; V., Belváros-Lipótváros; VI., Terézváros; VII., Erzsébetváros; VIII., Józsefváros; IX., Ferencváros; X., Kőbánya; XI., Újbuda; XII., Hegyvidék; XIII.; XIV., Zugló; XV., Rákospalota, Pestújhely, Újpalota; XVI.; XVII., Rákosmente; XVIII., Pestszentlőrinc-Pestszentimre; XIX., Kispest; XX., Pesterzsébet; XXI., Csepel; XXII., Budafok-Tétény; XXIII., Soroksár

Government
  - Type: Mayor–council government
  - Body: General Assembly of Budapest
  - Mayor: Gergely Karácsony (Dialogue)

Area
  - Capital city: 525.1 km^{2} (202.7 sq mi)
  - Urban: 2,538 km^{2} (980 sq mi)
  - Metro: 6,917 km^{2} (2,671 sq mi)
- Elevation (Danube - János Hill): 96–529 m (315–1,736 ft)

Population (2026)
  - Capital city: 1,675,777
  - Rank: 1st (10th in EU)
  - Density: 3,209/km^{2} (8,310/sq mi)
  - Urban (2024): 3,067,751
  - Metro: 3,303,786
  - Metro density: 477.6/km^{2} (1,237/sq mi)
- Demonyms: Budapester, budapesti (HU)

GDP (nominal, 2024)
  - Metro: €104.39 billion (US$117.82 billion)
  - Per capita: €34,555 (US$39,001.13)
- Time zone: UTC+01:00 (CET)
  - Summer (DST): UTC+02:00 (CEST)
- Postal code(s): 1011–1239
- Area code: 1
- ISO 3166 code: HU-BU
- NUTS code: HU101
- HDI (2023): 0.957 – very high · 1st
- Website: budapest.hu

UNESCO World Heritage Site
- Official name: Budapest, including the Banks of the Danube, the Buda Castle Quarter and Andrássy Avenue
- Type: Cultural
- Criteria: ii, iv
- Designated: 1987 (11th session)
- Reference no.: 400
- Area: 473.3 ha

Budapest (Note: Pronunciation: UK: /ˌb(j)uːdəˈpɛst, ˌbʊd-, ˈb(j)uːdəpɛst, ˈbʊd-/ BEW-də-PEST, BOO-, BUU-, -pest, US: /ˈbuːdəpɛst, -pɛʃt, ˌbuːdəˈpɛʃt/ BOO-də-pes(h)t, -PES(H)T; Hungarian: [ˈbudɒpɛʃt].) is the capital and largest city of Hungary. It is Hungary's primate city with 1.7 million inhabitants and its greater metro area has a population of about 3.3 million, representing one-third of the country's population and producing more than 40% of the country's economic output. Budapest is the political, economic, and cultural center of the country, among the ten largest cities in the European Union and the second largest urban area in Central and Eastern Europe. Budapest stands on the River Danube and is strategically located at the center of the Pannonian Basin, lying on ancient trade routes linking the hills of Transdanubia with the Great Plain.

Budapest is a global city, consistently ranked among the 50 most important cities in the world, belongs to the narrow group of cities with a GDP over US$120 billion, was named a global cultural capital as having high-quality human capital, and is among the 35 most liveable cities in the world. The city is home to over 30 universities with more than 150,000 students, most of them attending large public research universities that are highly ranked worldwide in their fields, such as Eötvös Loránd University in natural sciences, Budapest University of Technology in engineering and technology, MATE in life sciences, and Semmelweis University in medicine. Budapest also hosts various international organizations, including several UN agencies, the WHO Budapest Centre, IOM regional centre, the EU headquarters of EIT and CEPOL, as well as the first foreign office of China Investment Agency. Budapest opened the first underground transit line on the European continent in 1896, which is still in use as M1 Millennium Underground, and today the fixed-track metro and tram network forms the backbone of Budapest's public transport system and transports 2.2 million people daily, making it a significant urban transit system.

The history of Budapest began with an early Celtic settlement transformed by the Romans into the town of Aquincum, capital of Lower Pannonia in the 1st century. Following the foundation of Hungary in the late 9th century, the area was pillaged by the Mongols in 1241. It became the royal seat in 1361, with Buda becoming one of the European centers of renaissance culture by the 15th century under Matthias Corvinus. The siege of Buda in 1541 was followed by nearly 150 years of Ottoman rule, and after the reconquest of Buda in 1686, the region entered a new age of prosperity, with Pest-Buda becoming a global city after the unification of Buda, Pest and Óbuda in 1873. By this time, Budapest had become the co-capital of the Austro-Hungarian Empire, a great power that dissolved in 1918 following World War I. The city was also the focal point of the Hungarian Revolution of 1848, Battle of Budapest in 1945, and Hungarian Revolution of 1956.

The historic center of Budapest along the Danube is classified as a World Heritage Site due to its numerous notable monuments of classical architecture, from the 13th-century Matthias Church and Buda Castle to 19th-century landmarks such as the Hungarian Parliament, the State Opera House, the Museum of Fine Arts and St. Stephen's Basilica. Budapest has been a popular spa destination since Roman times and is considered the spa capital of Europe, with more than 100 medicinal geothermal springs and the largest thermal water cave system. The city is home to the second-largest synagogue and third-largest parliament building in the world, over 40 museums and galleries, nearly ten Michelin-starred restaurants, and named among the 50 best food cities globally for its focus on distinctive Hungarian cuisine. Budapest is also renowned for its nightlife, with ruin bars playing a significant role in it; moreover, the city has become a center for Hollywood film production in recent years. Budapest regularly hosts major global sporting events, with the nearly 70,000-seat Puskás Aréna serving as one of the venues, which most recently hosted four matches at UEFA Euro 2020, the 2023 UEFA Europa League final, the 2020 UEFA Super Cup, and the 2026 UEFA Champions League final. The city also hosted the 2023 World Athletics Championships and the 2017 and 2022 World Aquatics Championships. Budapest attracted 7 million international overnight visitors in 2025, making it one of the most popular destinations in Europe.

== Etymology and pronunciation ==
The previously separate cities of Buda, Óbuda, and Pest were officially unified in 1873 and given the new name Budapest. Before this, the towns together had sometimes been referred to colloquially as "Pest-Buda". Pest is often used pars pro toto for the entire city in contemporary colloquial Hungarian, although it is also used to refer to all parts of the city east of the Danube. Conversely, Buda colloquially means all districts to the Danube's west—including the former Óbuda. The Danube islands—including Csepel, the city's XXI. district—are part of neither Buda nor Pest.

All varieties of English pronounce the -s- as in the English word pest. The -u in Buda- is pronounced either /u/ like food (as in US: /ˈbuːdəpɛst/) or /ju/ like cue (as in UK: /ˌb(j)uːdəˈpɛst/). In Hungarian, the -s- is pronounced /ʃ/ as in wash; in IPA: Hungarian: [ˈbudɒpɛʃt].

The origins of the names "Buda" and "Pest" are obscure. Buda was

- probably the name of the first constable of the fortress built on the Castle Hill in the 11th century
- or a derivative of Bod or Bud, a personal name of Turkic origin, meaning 'twig'.
- or a Slavic personal name, Buda, the short form of Budimír, Budivoj.

Linguistically, however, a German origin through the Slavic derivative вода (voda, water) is not possible, and there is no certainty that a Turkic word really comes from the word buta ~ buda 'branch, twig'.

According to a legend recorded in chronicles from the Middle Ages, "Buda" comes from the name of its founder, Bleda, brother of Hunnic ruler Attila.

Attila went in the city of Sicambria in Pannonia, where he killed Buda, his brother, and he threw his corpse into the Danube. For while Attila was in the west, his brother crossed the boundaries in his reign, because he named Sicambria after his own name Buda's Castle. And though King Attila forbade the Huns and the other peoples to call that city Buda's Castle, but he called it Attila's Capital, the Germans who were terrified by the prohibition named the city as Eccylburg, which means Attila Castle, however, the Hungarians did not care about the ban and call it Óbuda [Old Buda] and call it to this day.

— Mark of Kalt: Chronicon Pictum

The Scythians are certainly an ancient people and the strength of Scythia lies in the east, as we said above. And the first king of Scythia was Magog, son of Japhet, and his people were called Magyars [Hungarians] after their King Magog, from whose royal line the most renowned and mighty King Attila descended, who, in the 451st year of Our Lord's birth, coming down from Scythia, entered Pannonia with a mighty force and, putting the Romans to flight, took the realm and made a royal residence for himself beside the Danube above the hot springs, and he ordered all the old buildings that he found there to be restored and he built them in a circular and very strong wall that in the Hungarian language is now called Budavár [Buda Castle] and by the Germans Etzelburg [Attila Castle]

— Anonymus: Gesta Hungarorum

There are several theories about Pest. One states that the name derives from Roman times, since there was a local fortress (Contra-Aquincum) called by Ptolemy "Pession" ("Πέσσιον", iii.7.§ 2). Another has it that Pest originates in the Slavic word for cave, пещера, or peštera. A third cites пещ, or pešt, referencing a cave where fires burned or a limekiln.

== History ==
=== Early history ===
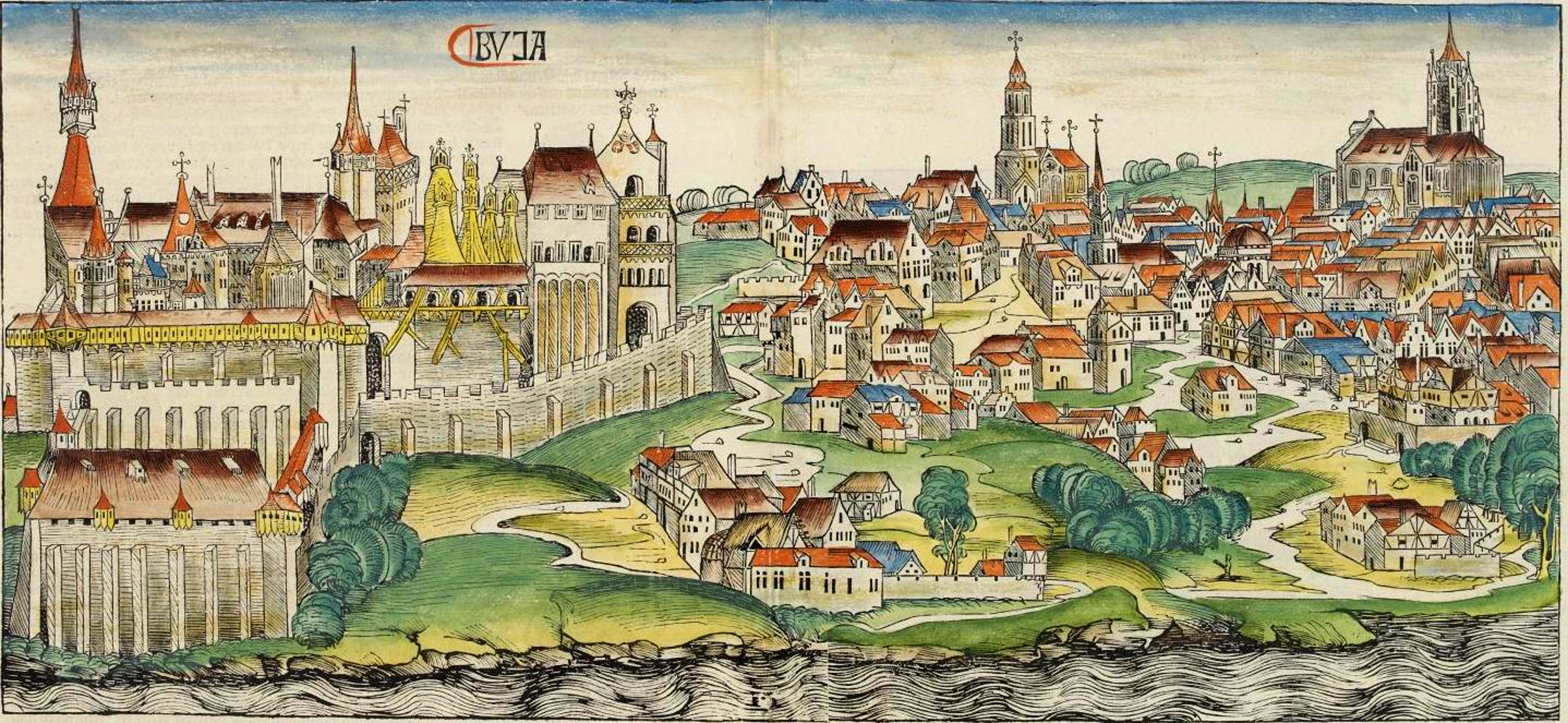
Buda during the Middle Ages, woodcut from the Nuremberg Chronicle (1493)

The first settlement on the territory of Budapest was built by Celts before 1 AD. It was later occupied by the Romans. The Roman settlement – Aquincum – became the main city of Pannonia Inferior in 106 AD. At first, it was a military settlement, and gradually the city rose around it, making it the focal point of the city's commercial life. Today, this area corresponds to the Óbuda district within Budapest. The Romans constructed roads, amphitheatres, baths and houses with heated floors in this fortified military camp. The Roman city of Aquincum is the best-conserved of the Roman sites in Hungary. The archaeological site was turned into a museum with indoor and open-air sections. Meanwhile, settlement in the area east of the Danube, which was not part of the Roman Empire, remained Germanic and Sarmatian in character.

The Magyar tribes led by Árpád, forced out of their original homeland north of Bulgaria by Tsar Simeon after the Battle of Southern Buh, settled in the territory at the end of the 9th century displacing the founding Bulgarian settlers of the towns of Buda and Pest, and a century later officially founded the Kingdom of Hungary. Research places the probable residence of the Árpáds as an early place of central power near what became Budapest. The Mongol invasion in the 13th century quickly proved it was difficult to defend a plain. King Béla IV of Hungary, therefore, ordered the construction of reinforced stone walls around the towns and set his own royal palace on the top of the protecting hills of Buda. German settlers were invited to rebuild and inhabit both Buda and Pest. In 1361 it became the capital of Hungary.

The cultural role of Buda was particularly significant during the reign of King Matthias Corvinus. The Italian Renaissance had a great influence on the city. His library, the Bibliotheca Corviniana, was Europe's greatest collection of historical chronicles and philosophic and scientific works in the 15th century, and second in size only to the Vatican Library. After the foundation of the first Hungarian university in Pécs in 1367 (University of Pécs), the second one was established in Óbuda in 1395 (University of Óbuda). The first Hungarian book was printed in Buda in 1473. Buda had about 5,000 inhabitants around the year 1500.

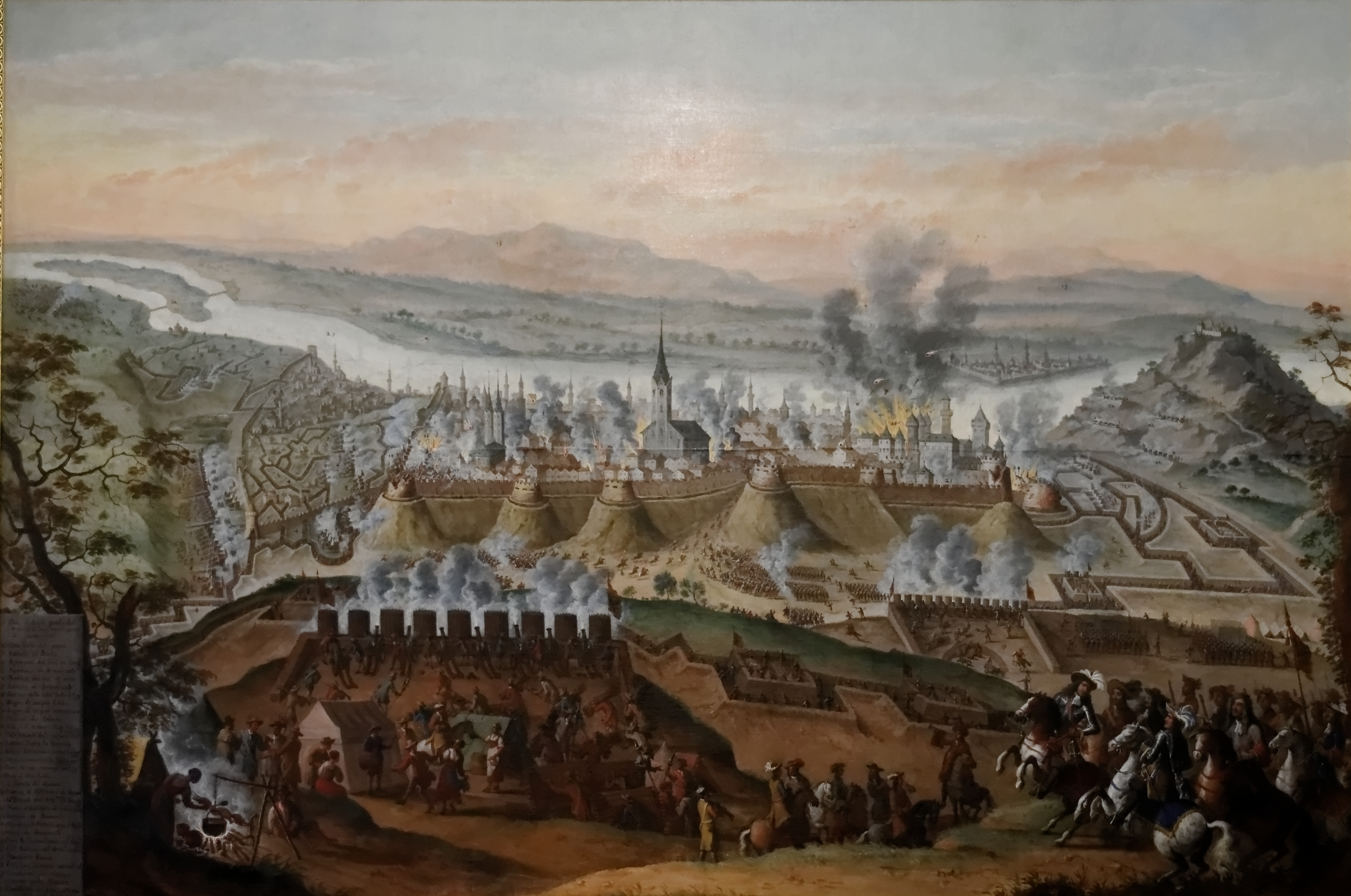
Retaking of Buda from the Ottoman Empire (1686) by Frans Geffels

The Ottomans conquered Buda in 1526, as well as in 1529, and finally occupied it in 1541. The Ottoman Rule lasted for more than 150 years. The Ottoman Turks constructed many prominent bathing facilities within the city. Some of the baths that the Turks erected during their rule are still in use 500 years later, including Rudas Baths and Király Baths. By 1547 the number of Christians was down to about a thousand, and by 1647 it had fallen to only about seventy. Following the Ottoman conquest, the western part of the Kingdom of Hungary remained under the Habsburg Monarchy's rule as Royal Hungary, a legally sovereign kingdom. Ferdinand I. sought to reform its institutions after the Battle of Mohács in 1526. The coronation of Habsburg rulers with the Holy Crown symbolised the Habsburg ruler's legitimacy on one hand, while also representing the reciprocal sharing of power between the king and the sovereign of Hungary.

In 1686, two years after the unsuccessful siege of Buda, a renewed campaign was started to enter Buda. This time, the Holy League's army was twice as large, containing over 74,000 men, including German, Croat, Dutch, Hungarian, English, Spanish, Czech, Italian, French, Burgundian, Danish and Swedish soldiers, along with other Europeans as volunteers, artillerymen, and officers. The Christian forces seized Buda, and in the next few years, all of the former Hungarian lands, except areas near Temesvár (Timișoara), were taken from the Turks. In the 1699 Treaty of Karlowitz, these territorial changes were officially recognized as the end of the rule of the Turks, and in 1718 the entire Kingdom of Hungary was removed from Ottoman rule.

=== Contemporary history after Unification ===
Millennium Underground (1894–1896), the second oldest metro in the world (after the London Underground)

The 19th century was dominated by the Hungarian struggle for independence and modernisation. The national insurrection against the Habsburgs began in the Hungarian capital in 1848 and was defeated one and a half years later, with the help of the Russian Empire. 1867 was the year of Reconciliation that brought about the birth of Austria-Hungary. This made Budapest the twin capital of a dual monarchy. It was this compromise which opened the second great phase of development in the history of Budapest, lasting until World War I. In 1849, the Chain Bridge linking Buda with Pest was opened as the first permanent bridge across the Danube and in 1873 Buda and Pest were officially merged with the third part, Óbuda (Old Buda), thus creating the new metropolis of Budapest. The dynamic Pest grew into the country's administrative, political, economic, trade and cultural hub.

Ethnic Hungarians overtook Germans in the second half of the 19th century due to mass migration from the overpopulated rural Transdanubia and Great Hungarian Plain. Between 1851 and 1910 the proportion of Hungarians increased from 35.6% to 85.9%, Hungarian became the dominant language, and German was crowded out. The proportion of Jews peaked in 1900 with 23.6%. Due to the prosperity and the large Jewish community of the city at the start of the 20th century, Budapest was often called the "Jewish Mecca" or "Judapest". Budapest also became an important centre for the Aromanian diaspora during the 19th century. In 1918, Austria-Hungary lost the war and collapsed; Hungary declared itself an independent republic (Republic of Hungary). On the 4th of August, 1919, the Romanian Army occupied Budapest, marking the end of the Hungarian-Romanian War. In 1920 the Treaty of Trianon partitioned the country, and as a result, Hungary lost over two-thirds of its territory, and about two-thirds of its inhabitants, including 3.3 million out of 15 million ethnic Hungarians.

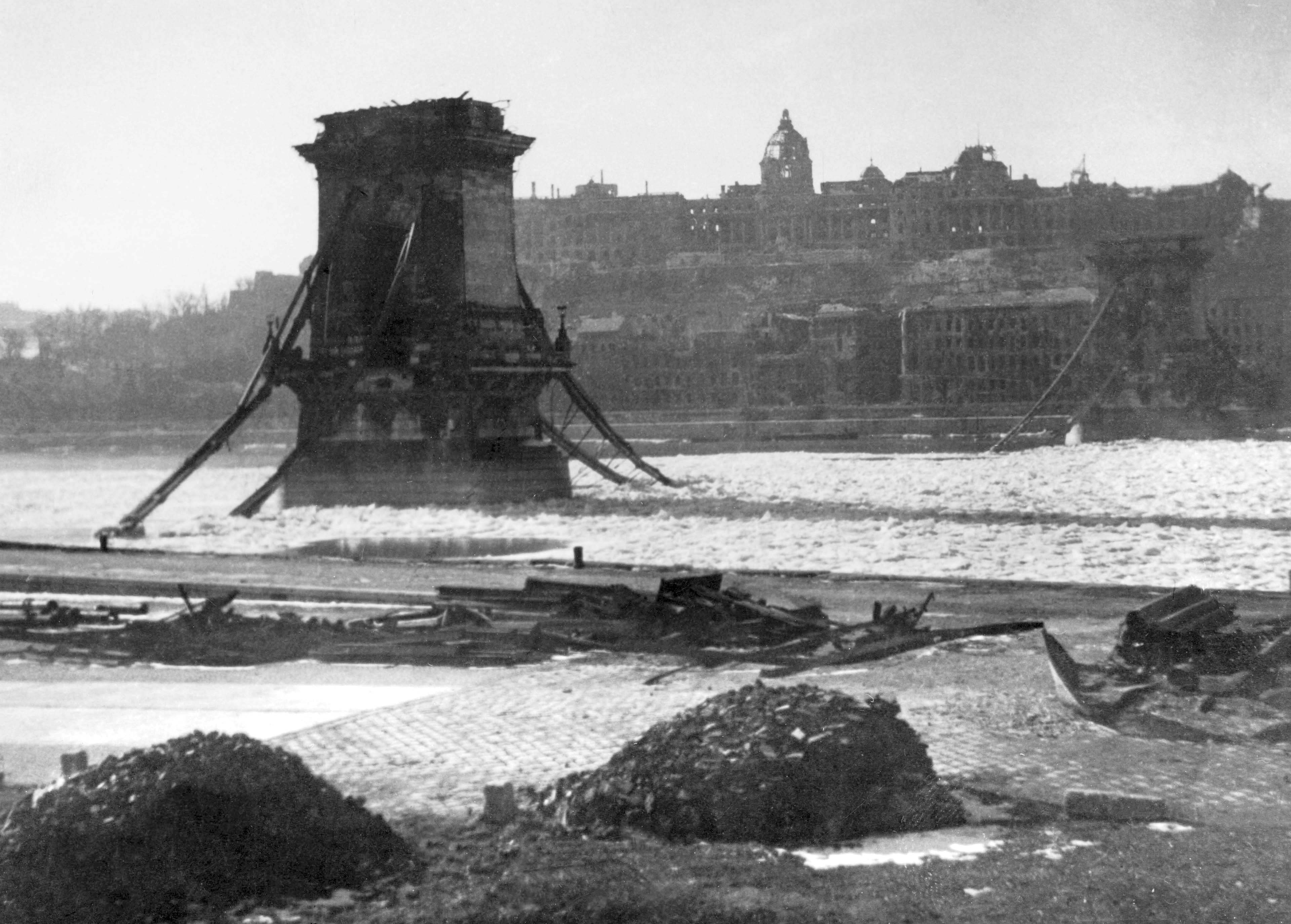
The Chain Bridge was destroyed during the Siege of Budapest.

In 1944, a year before the end of World War II, Budapest was partly destroyed by British and American air raids (first attack 4 April 1944). From 24 December 1944 to 13 February 1945, the city was besieged during the Battle of Budapest. Budapest sustained major damage caused by the attacking Soviet and Romanian troops and the defending German and Hungarian troops. More than 38,000 civilians died during the conflict. All bridges were destroyed by the Germans. The stone lions that have decorated the Chain Bridge since 1852 survived the devastation of the war. Between 20% and 40% of Greater Budapest's 250,000 Jewish inhabitants died through Nazi and Arrow Cross Party, during the German occupation of Hungary, from 1944 to early 1945.

Swiss diplomat Carl Lutz rescued tens of thousands of Jews by issuing Swiss protection papers and designating numerous buildings, including the now famous Glass House (Üvegház) at Vadász Street 29, to be Swiss protected territory. About 3,000 Hungarian Jews found refuge at the Glass House and in a neighbouring building. Swedish diplomat Raoul Wallenberg saved the lives of tens of thousands of Jews in Budapest by giving them Swedish protection papers and taking them under his consular protection. Wallenberg was abducted by the Russians on 17 January 1945 and never regained freedom. Giorgio Perlasca, an Italian citizen, saved thousands of Hungarian Jews posing as a Spanish diplomat. Some other diplomats also abandoned diplomatic protocol and rescued Jews. There are two monuments for Wallenberg, one for Carl Lutz and one for Giorgio Perlasca in Budapest.

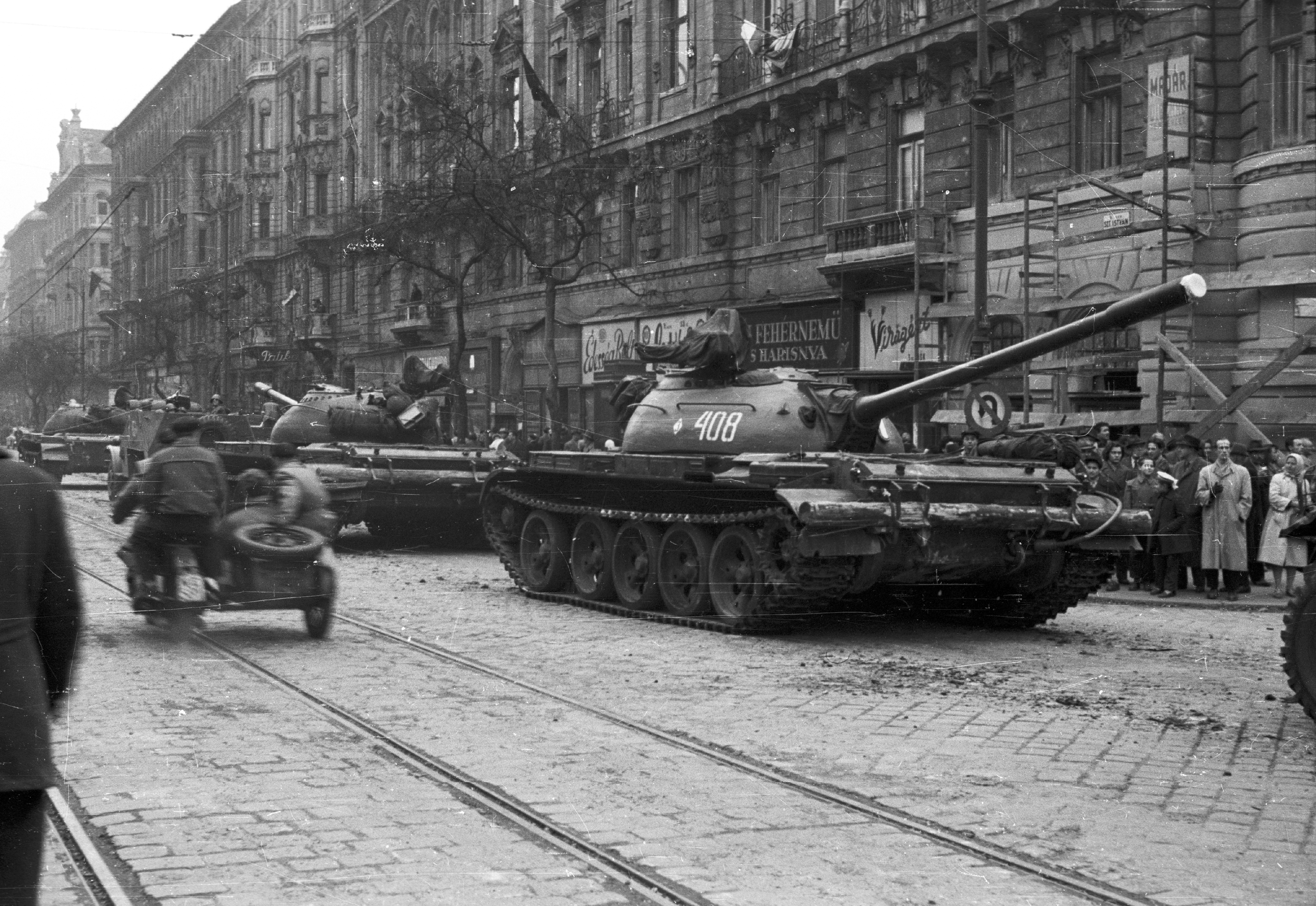
Soviet tanks in Budapest (1956)

Following the capture of Hungary from Nazi Germany by the Red Army, Soviet military occupation ensued, which ended in 1991. The Soviets exerted significant influence on Hungarian political affairs. In 1949, Hungary was declared a communist People's Republic (People's Republic of Hungary). The new Communist government considered the buildings like the Buda Castle symbols of the former regime, and during the 1950s the palace was gutted and all the interiors were destroyed (also see Stalin era). On 23 October 1956, citizens held a large peaceful demonstration in Budapest demanding democratic reform. The demonstrators went to the Budapest radio station and demanded to publish their demands. The regime ordered troops to shoot into the crowd. Hungarian soldiers gave rifles to the demonstrators who were now able to capture the building. This initiated the Hungarian Revolution of 1956. The demonstrators demanded to appoint Imre Nagy to be Prime Minister of Hungary. To their surprise, the central committee of the "Hungarian Working People's Party" did so that same evening. This uprising was an anti-Soviet revolt that lasted from 23 October until 11 November. After Nagy had declared that Hungary was to leave the Warsaw Pact and become neutral, Soviet tanks and troops entered the country to crush the revolt. Fighting continued until mid November, leaving more than 3000 dead. A monument was erected at the fiftieth anniversary of the revolt in 2006, at the edge of the City Park. Its shape is a wedge with a 56 angle degree made in rusted iron that gradually becomes shiny, ending in an intersection to symbolize Hungarian forces that temporarily eradicated the Communist leadership.

From the 1960s to the late 1980s, Hungary was often satirically referred to as "the happiest barrack" within the Eastern bloc, and much of the wartime damage to the city was finally repaired. Work on Erzsébet Bridge, the last to be rebuilt, was finished in 1964. In the early 1970s, Budapest Metro's east–west M2 line was first opened, followed by the M3 line in 1976. In 1987, Buda Castle and the banks of the Danube were included in the UNESCO list of World Heritage Sites. Andrássy Avenue (including the Millennium Underground Railway, Hősök tere, and Városliget) was added to the UNESCO list in 2002. In the 1980s, the city's population reached 2.1 million. In recent times a significant decrease in population occurred mainly due to a massive movement to the neighbouring agglomeration in Pest county, i.e., suburbanisation.

In the last decades of the 20th century the political changes of 1989–90 (Fall of the Iron Curtain) concealed changes in civil society and along the streets of Budapest. The monuments of the dictatorship were removed from public places, into Memento Park. In the first 20 years of the new democracy, the development of the city was managed by its mayor, Gábor Demszky.

In October 2019, opposition candidate Gergely Karácsony won the Budapest mayoral election, meaning the first electoral blow for Hungary's nationalist prime minister Viktor Orbán since coming to power in 2010.

== Geography ==
=== Topography ===
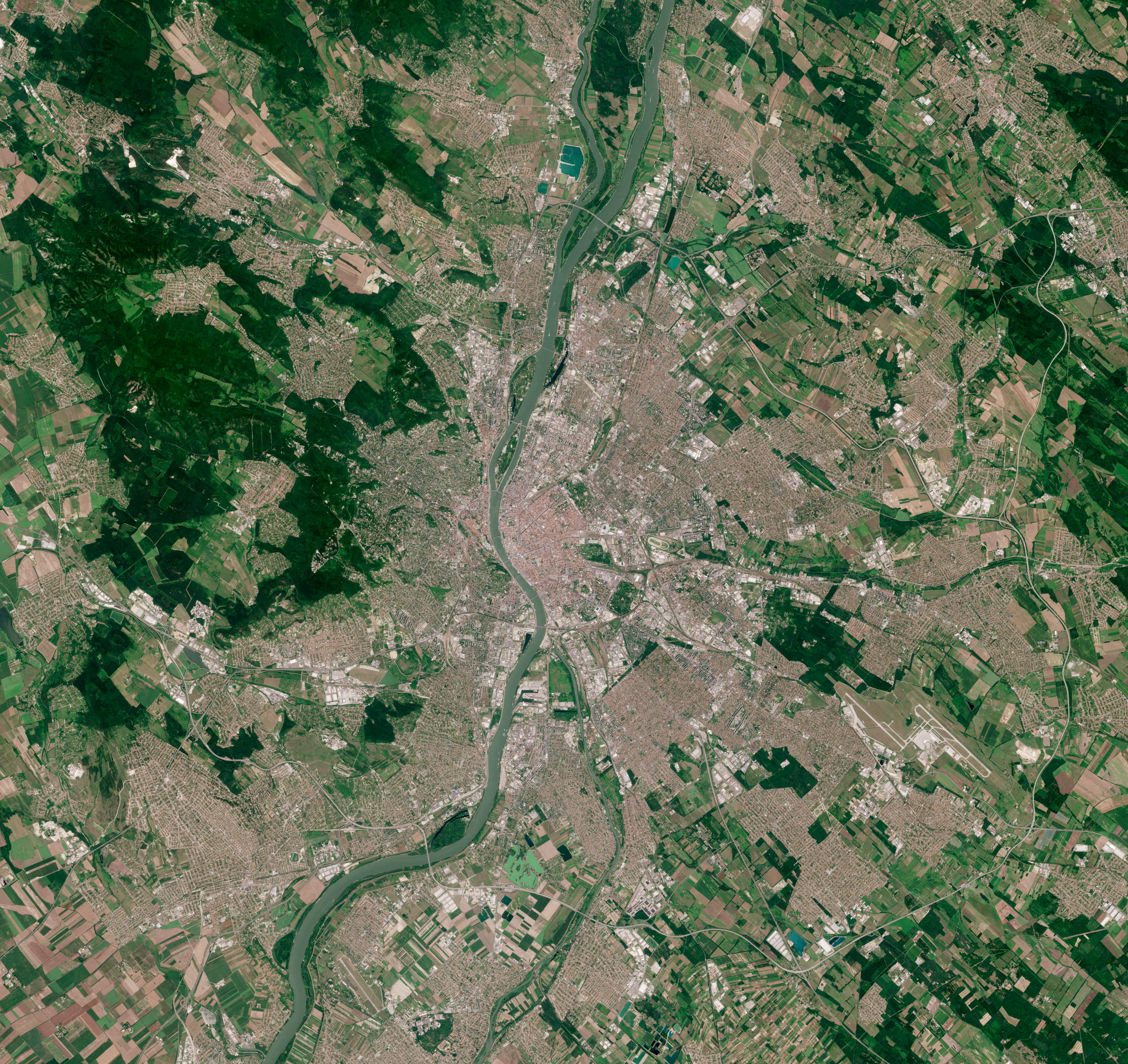
Satellite imagery of Budapest

Budapest, strategically placed at the centre of the Pannonian Basin, lies on an ancient route linking the hills of Transdanubia with the Great Plain. By car, it is 216 kilometres (134 mi) southeast of Vienna, Austria; 545 kilometres (339 mi) south of Warsaw, Poland; 1,565 kilometres (972 mi) southwest of Moscow, Russia; 1,122 kilometres (697 mi) north of Athens, Greece; 1,235 kilometres (767 mi) northeast of Rome, Italy; 788 kilometres (490 mi) northeast of Milan, Italy; 443 kilometres (275 mi) southeast of Prague, Czech Republic; 343 kilometres (213 mi) northeast of Zagreb, Croatia; 748 kilometres (465 mi) northeast of Split, Croatia; and 1,329 kilometres (826 mi) northwest of Istanbul, Turkey.

The 525-square-kilometre (203 sq mi) area of Budapest lies in Central Hungary, surrounded by settlements of the agglomeration in Pest county. The capital extends 25 and 29 km (16 and 18 mi) in the north–south, east–west direction respectively. The Danube enters the city from the north; later it encircles two islands, Óbuda Island and Margaret Island. The third island Csepel Island is the largest of the Budapest Danube islands, however only its northernmost tip is within city limits. The river that separates the two parts of the city is 230 m (755 ft) wide at its narrowest point in Budapest. Pest lies on the flat terrain of the Great Plain while Buda is rather hilly.

The wide Danube was always fordable at this point because of a small number of islands in the middle of the river. The city has marked topographical contrasts: Buda is built on the higher river terraces and hills of the western side, while the considerably larger Pest spreads out on a flat and featureless sand plain on the river's opposite bank. Pest's terrain rises with a slight eastward gradient, so the easternmost parts of the city lie at the same elevation as Buda's smallest hills, notably Gellért Hill and Castle Hill.

The Buda hills consist mainly of limestone and dolomite, the water created speleothems, the most famous ones being the Pálvölgyi cave (total length 7,200 m or 23,600 ft) and the Szemlőhegyi cave (total length 2,200 m or 7,200 ft). The hills were formed in the Triassic Period. The highest point of the hills and of Budapest is János Hill, at 527 metres (1,729 feet) above sea level. The lowest point is the line of the Danube which is 96 metres (315 feet) above sea level. Budapest is also rich in green areas. Of the 525 square kilometres (203 square miles) occupied by the city, 83 square kilometres (32 square miles) is green area, park and forest. The forests of Buda hills are environmentally protected.

The city's importance in terms of traffic is very central, because many major European roads and European railway lines lead to Budapest. The Danube was and is still an important water-way and this region in the centre of the Carpathian Basin lies at the cross-roads of trade routes. Budapest is one of only three capital cities in the world which has thermal springs (the others being Reykjavík in Iceland and Sofia in Bulgaria). Some 125 springs produce 70 million litres (18 million US gallons) of thermal water a day, with temperatures ranging up to 58 °C. Some of these waters have been claimed to have medicinal effects due to their high mineral contents.

=== Climate ===
Budapest has a transitional climate between a humid temperate climate (Köppen: Cfa, Trewartha: Doak), and a humid continental climate (Köppen: Dfa, Trewartha: Dcao), with warm to hot summers and chilly winters. Winter (November until early March) can be cold and the city receives little sunshine. Snowfall is fairly frequent in most years, and nighttime temperatures of −10 °C (14 °F) are not uncommon between mid-December and mid-February. The spring months (March and April) see variable conditions, with a rapid increase in the average temperature. The weather in late March and in April is often very agreeable during the day and fresh at night. Budapest's long summer – lasting from May until mid-September – is warm or very warm. Sudden heavy showers also occur, particularly in May and June. The autumn in Budapest (mid-September until late October) is characterised by little rain and long sunny days with moderate temperatures. Temperatures often turn abruptly colder in late October or early November.

Mean annual precipitation in Budapest is around 586 mm (23.1 in). On average, there are 84 days with precipitation and 1988 hours of sunshine (of a possible 4383) each year. The city lies on the boundary between Zone 6 and Zone 7 in terms of the hardiness zone.

Climate data for Pestszentlőrinc, Budapest (WMO number: 12843) 1991-2020; elevation: 139m
Month	Jan	Feb	Mar	Apr	May	Jun	Jul	Aug	Sep	Oct	Nov	Dec	Year
Record high °C (°F)	18.1 (64.6)	20.6 (69.1)	26.1 (79.0)	32.0 (89.6)	34.0 (93.2)	39.5 (103.1)	40.7 (105.3)	40.0 (104.0)	37.6 (99.7)	30.8 (87.4)	23.4 (74.1)	19.3 (66.7)	40.7 (105.3)
Mean maximum °C (°F)	11.0 (51.8)	13.5 (56.3)	19.4 (66.9)	24.8 (76.6)	28.9 (84.0)	32.8 (91.0)	34.8 (94.6)	34.7 (94.5)	29.3 (84.7)	23.5 (74.3)	16.5 (61.7)	11.2 (52.2)	35.8 (96.4)
Mean daily maximum °C (°F)	3.0 (37.4)	5.8 (42.4)	11.3 (52.3)	17.9 (64.2)	22.6 (72.7)	26.2 (79.2)	28.1 (82.6)	28.0 (82.4)	22.5 (72.5)	16.4 (61.5)	9.4 (48.9)	3.5 (38.3)	16.2 (61.2)
Daily mean °C (°F)	0.0 (32.0)	2.0 (35.6)	6.6 (43.9)	12.4 (54.3)	16.9 (62.4)	20.7 (69.3)	22.5 (72.5)	22.3 (72.1)	16.9 (62.4)	11.3 (52.3)	5.9 (42.6)	0.8 (33.4)	11.5 (52.7)
Mean daily minimum °C (°F)	−2.5 (27.5)	−1.3 (29.7)	2.3 (36.1)	7.1 (44.8)	11.6 (52.9)	15.2 (59.4)	16.7 (62.1)	16.6 (61.9)	12.2 (54.0)	7.2 (45.0)	3.1 (37.6)	−1.4 (29.5)	7.2 (45.0)
Mean minimum °C (°F)	−9.8 (14.4)	−7.6 (18.3)	−3.4 (25.9)	1.5 (34.7)	6.1 (43.0)	10.3 (50.5)	12.4 (54.3)	12.1 (53.8)	7.2 (45.0)	1.5 (34.7)	−3.8 (25.2)	−7.4 (18.7)	−12.1 (10.2)
Record low °C (°F)	−27.1 (−16.8)	−25.0 (−13.0)	−15.5 (4.1)	−7.2 (19.0)	−3.3 (26.1)	0.5 (32.9)	4.0 (39.2)	5.0 (41.0)	−3.1 (26.4)	−9.5 (14.9)	−16.4 (2.5)	−22.0 (−7.6)	−27.1 (−16.8)
Average precipitation mm (inches)	31.0 (1.22)	31.3 (1.23)	31.5 (1.24)	34.6 (1.36)	64.8 (2.55)	65.0 (2.56)	74.0 (2.91)	58.7 (2.31)	51.3 (2.02)	44.0 (1.73)	46.8 (1.84)	38.5 (1.52)	571.5 (22.49)
Average precipitation days (≥ 1.0 mm)	6.1	5.6	5.9	5.7	8.4	6.6	7.6	5.3	5.5	6.2	7.0	7.1	77
Average relative humidity (%)	84	77	66	59.2	63.4	63.9	62	62.9	69.2	76.8	83	84.7	71.0
Average dew point °C (°F)	−4.0 (24.8)	−2.2 (28.0)	0.4 (32.7)	3.7 (38.7)	8.8 (47.8)	11.9 (53.4)	12.8 (55.0)	12.8 (55.0)	10.3 (50.5)	6.3 (43.3)	2.1 (35.8)	−1.7 (28.9)	5.1 (41.2)
Mean monthly sunshine hours	55.4	83.8	137.3	182.1	230.3	248.1	274.2	254.6	197.3	156.4	67.4	47.5	1,934.4
Source 1: NOAA (Dew point and sun 1961-1990)
Source 2:

Climate data for Budapest (WMO station number:12840), (1991–2020 normals, extremes 1870–present)
Month	Jan	Feb	Mar	Apr	May	Jun	Jul	Aug	Sep	Oct	Nov	Dec	Year
Record high °C (°F)	18.1 (64.6)	20.6 (69.1)	26.1 (79.0)	32.0 (89.6)	34.0 (93.2)	39.5 (103.1)	40.7 (105.3)	40.0 (104.0)	37.6 (99.7)	30.8 (87.4)	23.4 (74.1)	19.3 (66.7)	40.7 (105.3)
Mean daily maximum °C (°F)	4.7 (40.5)	7.1 (44.8)	12.3 (54.1)	18.8 (65.8)	23.1 (73.6)	26.8 (80.2)	28.8 (83.8)	28.9 (84.0)	23.1 (73.6)	17.2 (63.0)	10.6 (51.1)	5.1 (41.2)	17.2 (63.0)
Daily mean °C (°F)	1.3 (34.3)	3.1 (37.6)	7.5 (45.5)	13.3 (55.9)	17.6 (63.7)	21.5 (70.7)	23.3 (73.9)	22.9 (73.2)	17.8 (64.0)	12.3 (54.1)	7.2 (45.0)	2.1 (35.8)	12.5 (54.5)
Mean daily minimum °C (°F)	−1.2 (29.8)	0.1 (32.2)	3.9 (39.0)	9.1 (48.4)	12.8 (55.0)	16.3 (61.3)	18.0 (64.4)	17.7 (63.9)	13.3 (55.9)	8.7 (47.7)	4.3 (39.7)	−0.2 (31.6)	8.6 (47.4)
Record low °C (°F)	−27.1 (−16.8)	−25.0 (−13.0)	−15.5 (4.1)	−7.2 (19.0)	−3.3 (26.1)	0.5 (32.9)	4.0 (39.2)	5.0 (41.0)	−3.1 (26.4)	−9.5 (14.9)	−16.4 (2.5)	−22.0 (−7.6)	−27.1 (−16.8)
Average precipitation mm (inches)	33 (1.3)	30.2 (1.19)	31.2 (1.23)	32.5 (1.28)	57.3 (2.26)	60.0 (2.36)	53.7 (2.11)	54.2 (2.13)	46.1 (1.81)	44.1 (1.74)	46.2 (1.82)	37.7 (1.48)	526.2 (20.71)
Average precipitation days (≥ 1.0 mm)	6	6	5.7	5.7	8	6.6	6.4	5.6	5.6	6.7	7.1	6.8	76.2
Average relative humidity (%)	74.3	68.6	59.6	53.8	57.3	58	56.1	56.7	63.3	69.5	74.5	76.5	64.0
Average dew point °C (°F)	−3.9 (25.0)	−2.3 (27.9)	0.0 (32.0)	3.4 (38.1)	8.3 (46.9)	11.4 (52.5)	12.4 (54.3)	12.4 (54.3)	10.2 (50.4)	6.2 (43.2)	1.9 (35.4)	−1.8 (28.8)	4.9 (40.7)
Mean monthly sunshine hours	53.8	83.4	133.4	179.5	233.8	250.6	279.4	253.8	195.7	150.7	65.1	49.2	1,928.4
Average ultraviolet index	2	3	3	5	5	6	6	6	4	3	2	2	4
Source: NCEI(dew point and sun 1961-1990) Weather Atlas (UV)

== Architecture ==
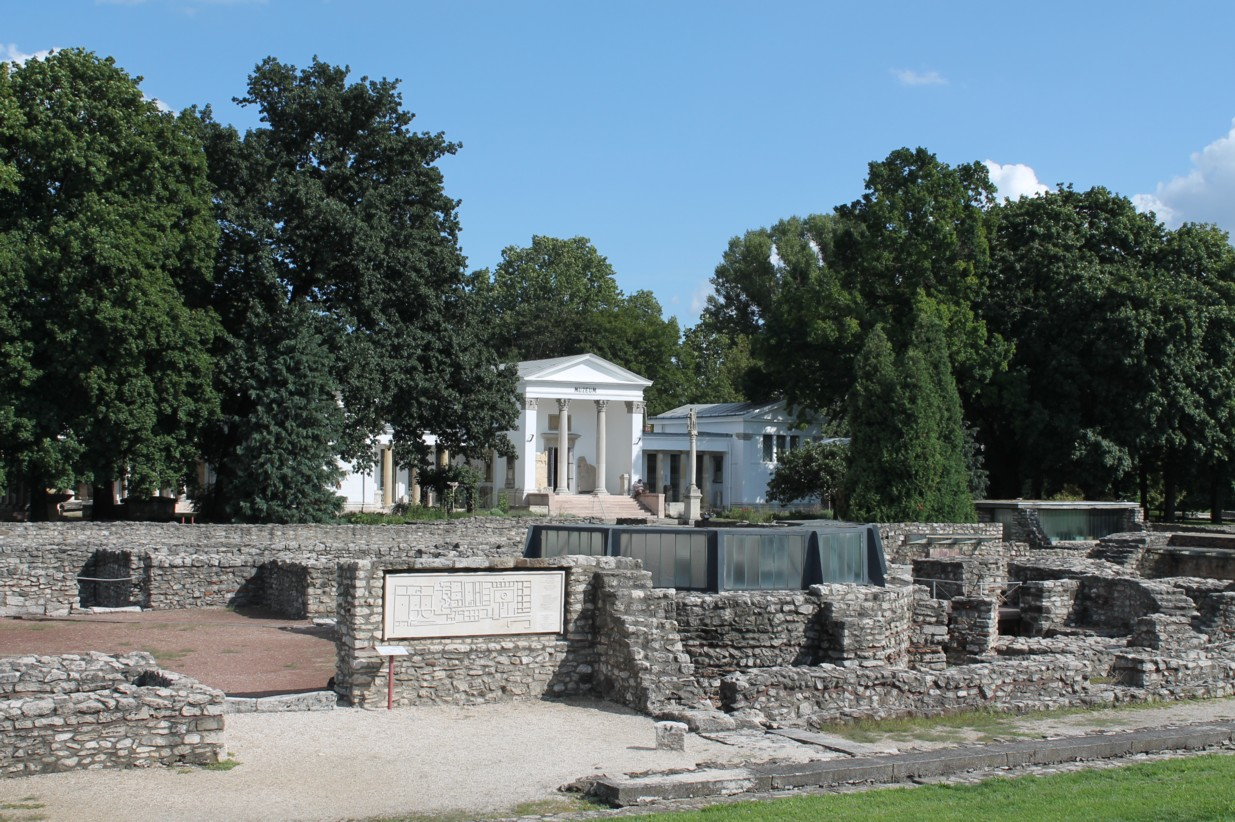
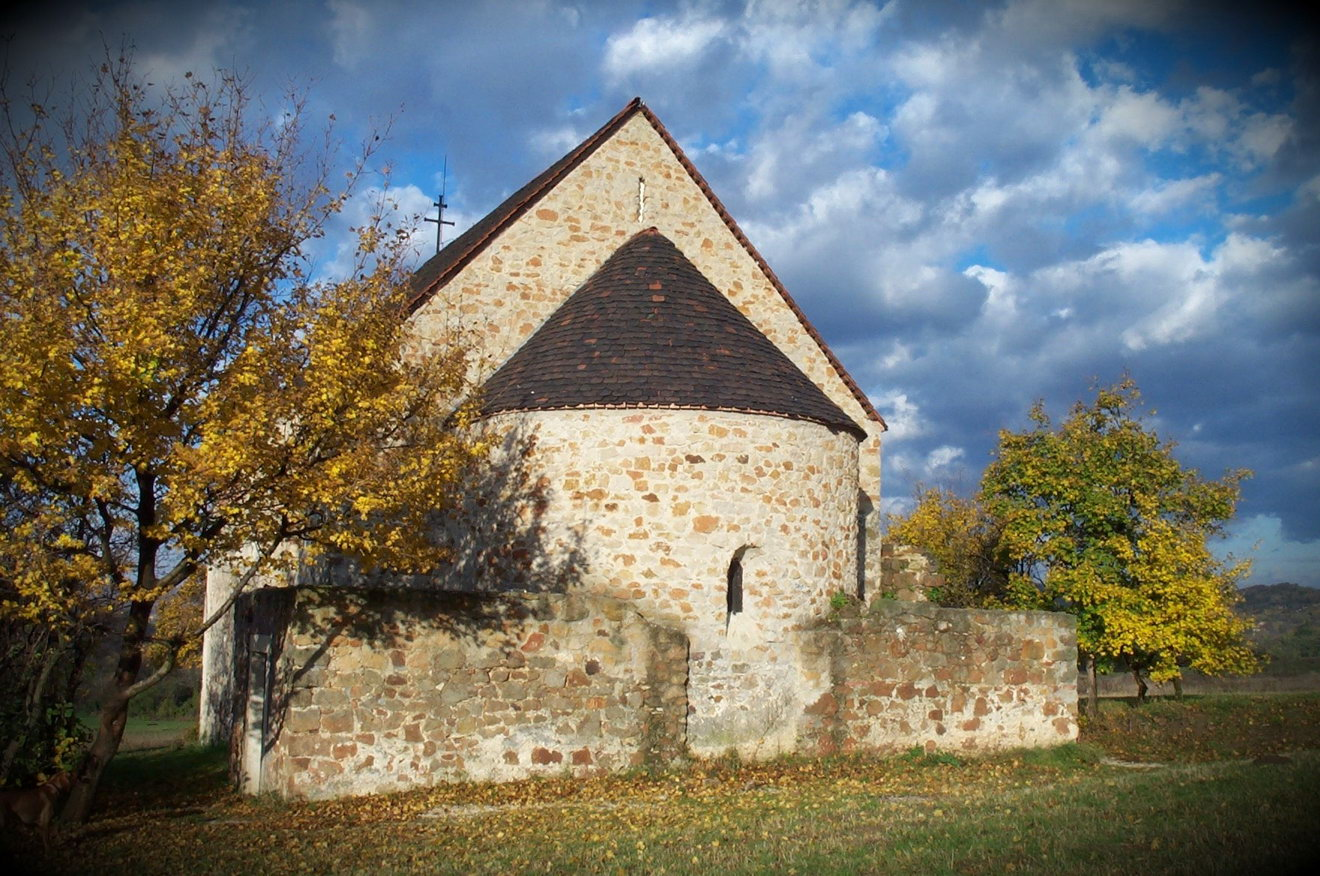
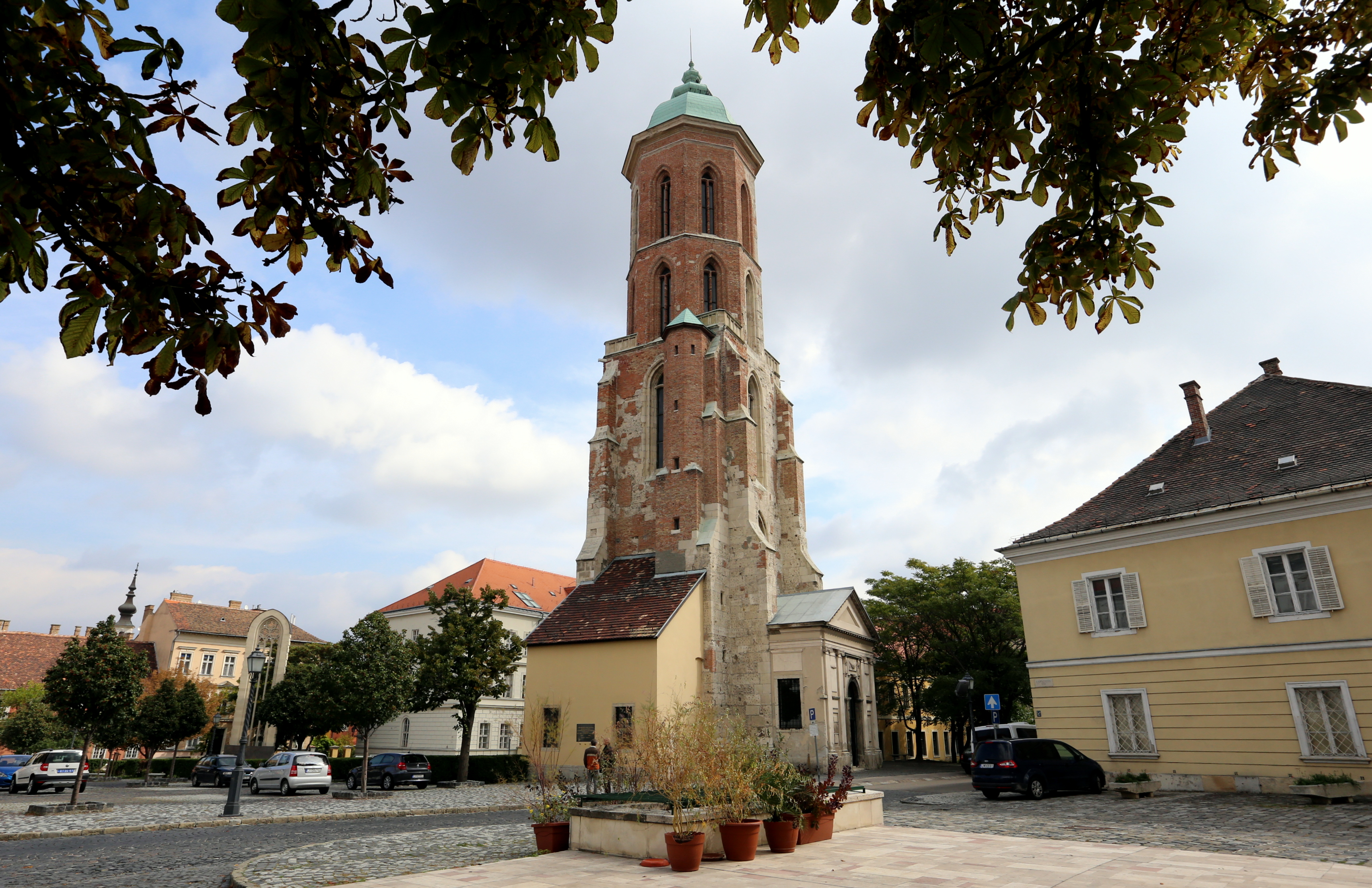
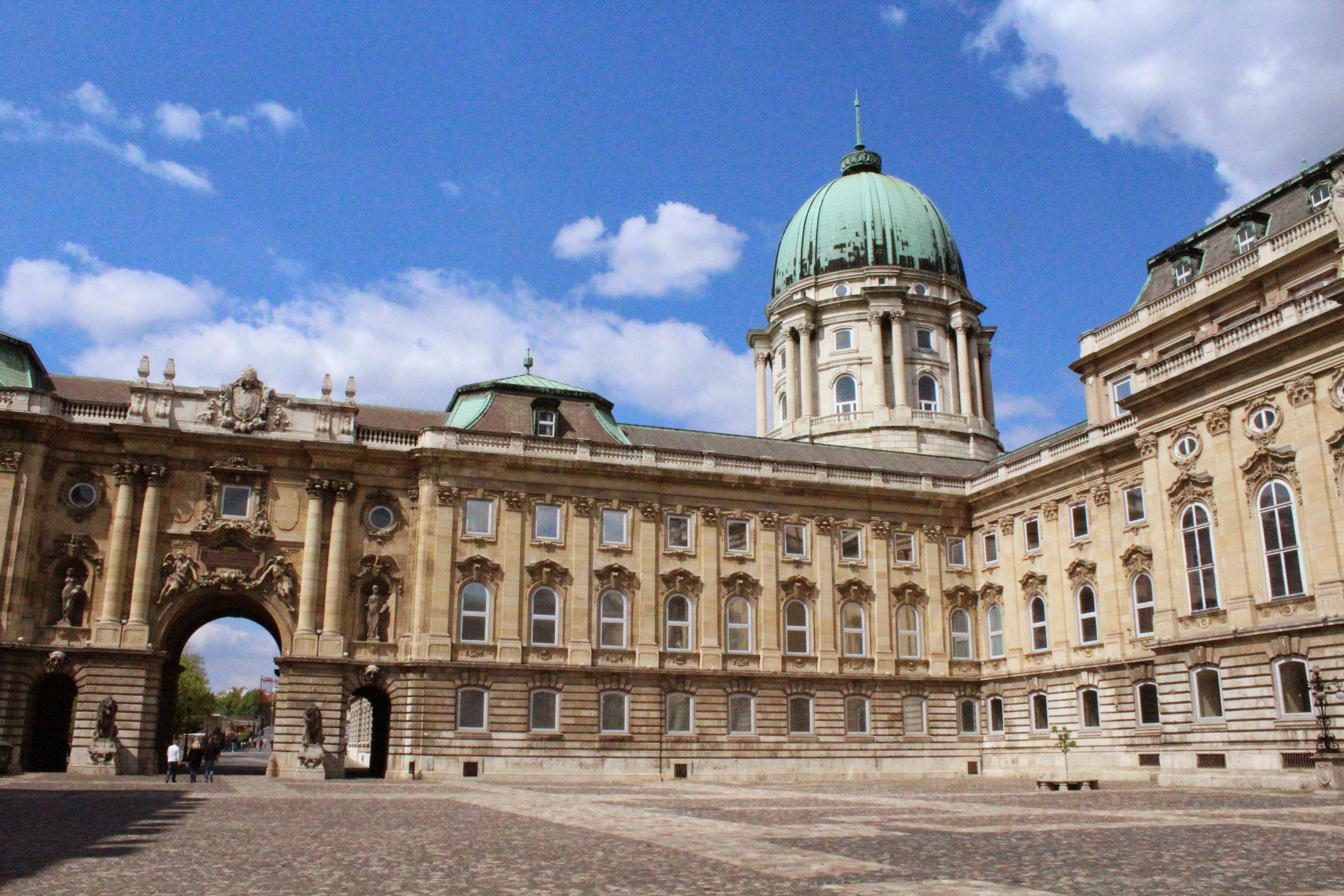
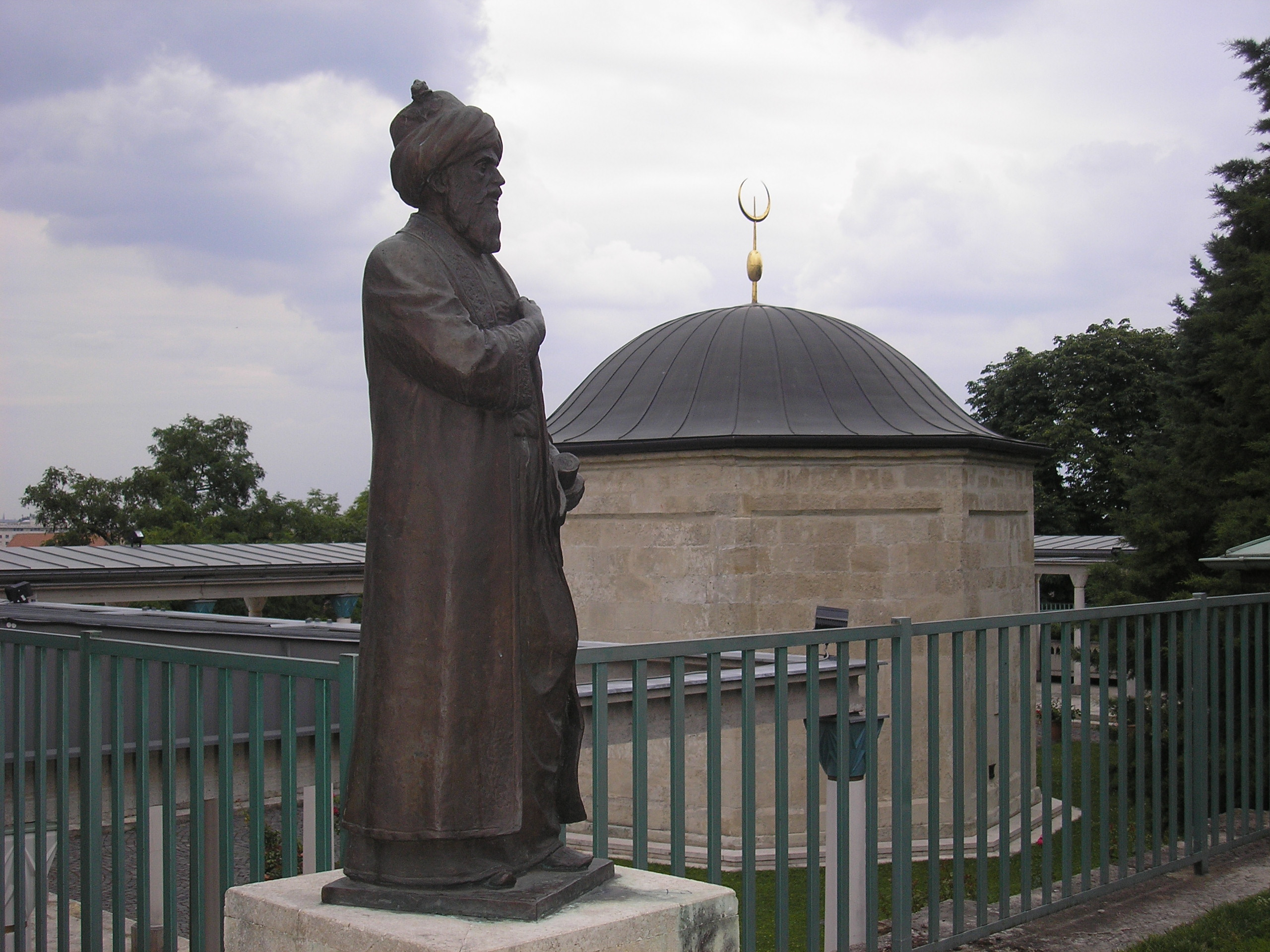
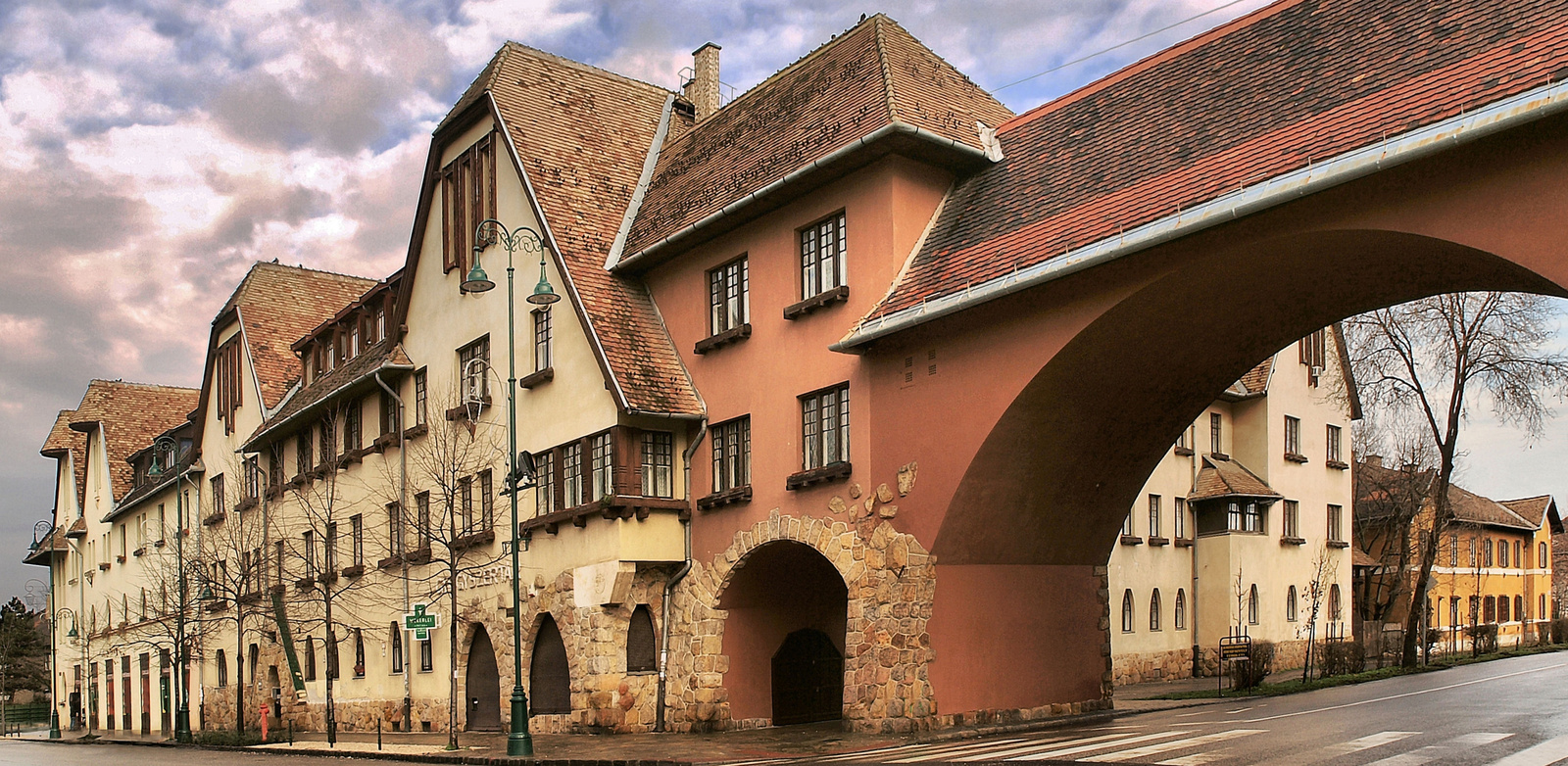
Clockwise, from upper left: the ruins of the Celtic and Roman civil town of Aquincum; Romanesque 12th century Gercse Parish Church; the Buda Castle; Kós Károly Square in the Wekerletelep; Ottoman Tomb of Gül Baba; and Gothic Mary Magdalene Church

Budapest has architecturally noteworthy buildings in a wide range of styles and from distinct time periods, from the ancient times as Roman City of Aquincum in Óbuda (District III), which dates to around 89 AD, to the most modern Palace of Arts, the contemporary arts museum and concert hall.

Most buildings in Budapest are relatively low: in the early 2010s there were around 100 buildings higher than 45 metres (148 ft). The number of high-rise buildings is kept low by building legislation, which is aimed at preserving the historic cityscape and to meet the requirements of the World Heritage Site. Strong rules apply to the planning, authorisation and construction of high-rise buildings and consequently much of the inner city does not have any. Some planners would like to see an easing of the rules for the construction of skyscrapers, and the possibility of building skyscrapers outside the city's historic core has been raised.

In the chronological order of architectural styles Budapest is represented on the entire timeline, starting with the Roman City of Aquincum representing ancient architecture.

The next determinative style is the Gothic architecture in Budapest. The few remaining Gothic buildings can be found in the Castle District. Buildings of note are no. 18, 20 and 22 on Országház Street, which date back to the 14th century and No. 31 Úri Street, which has a Gothic façade that dates back to the 15th century. Other buildings with Gothic features are the Inner City Parish Church, built in the 12th century, and the Mary Magdalene Church, completed in the 15th century. The most characteristic Gothic-style buildings are actually Neo-Gothic, like the most well-known Budapest landmarks, the Hungarian Parliament Building and the Matthias Church, where much of the original material was used (originally built in Romanesque style in 1015).

The next chapter in the history of human architecture is Renaissance architecture. One of the earliest places to be influenced by the Renaissance style of architecture was Hungary, and Budapest in particular. The style appeared following the marriage of King Matthias Corvinus and Beatrice of Naples in 1476. Many Italian artists, craftsmen and masons came to Buda with the new queen. Today, many of the original renaissance buildings disappeared during the varied history of Buda, but Budapest is still rich in renaissance and neo-renaissance buildings, like the famous Hungarian State Opera House, St. Stephen's Basilica and the Hungarian Academy of Sciences.

During the Turkish occupation (1541–1686), Islamic culture flourished in Budapest; multiple mosques and baths were built in the city. These were great examples of Ottoman architecture, which was influenced by Muslims from around the world including Turkish, Iranian, Arabian and to a larger extent, Byzantine architecture as well as Islamic traditions. After the Holy League conquered Budapest, they replaced most of the mosques with churches and minarets were turned into bell towers and cathedral spires. At one point the distinct sloping central square in Budapest became a bustling Oriental bazaar, which was filled with "the chatter of camel caravans on their way to Yemen and India". Budapest is in fact one of the few places in the world with functioning original hammams (bath houses) dating back to the 16th century, like Rudas Baths or Király Baths. Budapest is home to the northernmost place where the tomb of influential Islamic Turkish Sufi Dervish, Gül Baba is found. Various cultures converged in Hungary seemed to coalesce well with each other, as if all these different cultures and architecture styles are digested into Hungary's own way of cultural blend. A precedent to show the city's self-conscious is the top section of the city's main square, named as Szechenyi. When Turks came to the city, they built mosques here which was aggressively replaced with Gothic church of St. Bertalan. The rationale of reusing the base of the former Islamic building mosque and reconstruction into Gothic Church but Islamic style architecture over it is typically Islamic are still visible. An official term for the rationale is spolia. The mosque was called the djami of Pasha Gazi Kassim, and djami means congregational or Friday mosque in Arabic. After Turks and Muslims were expelled and massacred from Budapest, the site was reoccupied by Christians and reformed into a church, the Inner City Parish Church (Budapest). The minaret and Turkish entranceway were removed. The shape of the architecture is its only hint of exotic past—"two surviving prayer niches facing Mecca and an ecumenical symbol atop its cupola: a cross rising above the Turkish crescent moon".

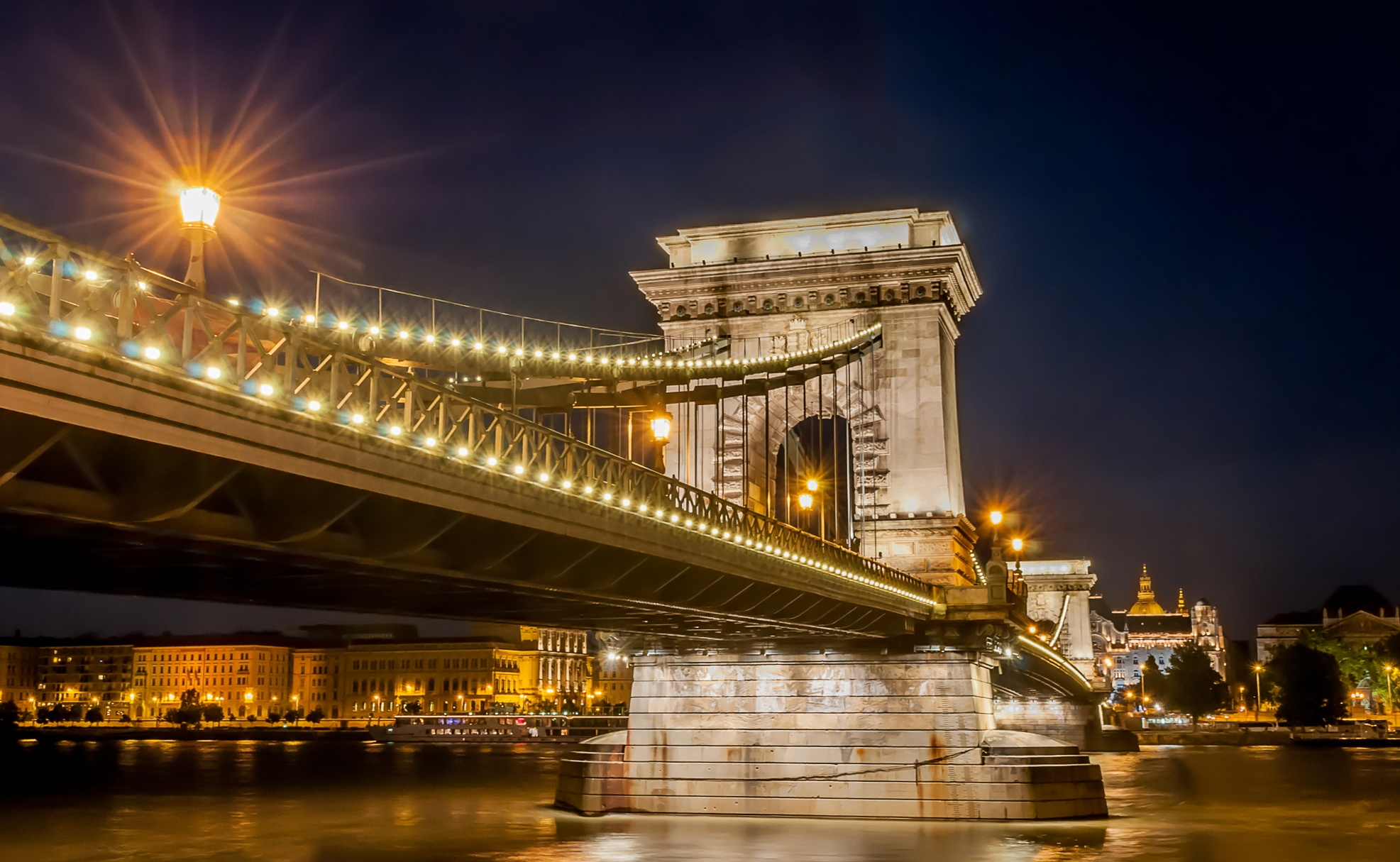
The most famous Budapest bridge, the Chain Bridge, the icon of the city's 19th century development, built in 1849

After 1686, the Baroque architecture designated the dominant style of art in catholic countries from the 17th century to the 18th century. There are many Baroque-style buildings in Budapest and one of the finest examples of preserved Baroque-style architecture is the Church of St. Anna in Batthyhány square. An interesting part of Budapest is the less touristy Óbuda, the main square of which also has some beautiful preserved historic buildings with Baroque façades. The Castle District is another place to visit where the best-known landmark Buda Royal Palace and many other buildings were built in the Baroque style.

The Classical architecture and Neoclassical architecture are the next in the timeline. Budapest had not one but two architects that were masters of the Classicist style. Mihály Pollack (1773–1855) and József Hild (1789–1867), built many beautiful Classicist-style buildings in the city. Some of the best examples are the Hungarian National Museum, the Lutheran Church of Budavár (both designed by Pollack) and the seat of the Hungarian president, the Sándor Palace. The most iconic and widely known Classicist-style attraction in Budapest is the Széchenyi Chain Bridge. Budapest's two most beautiful Romantic architecture buildings are the Great Synagogue in Dohány Street and the Vigadó Concert Hall on the Danube Promenade, both designed by architect Frigyes Feszl (1821–1884). Another noteworthy structure is the Budapest Western Railway Station, which was designed by August de Serres and built by the Eiffel Company of Paris in 1877.

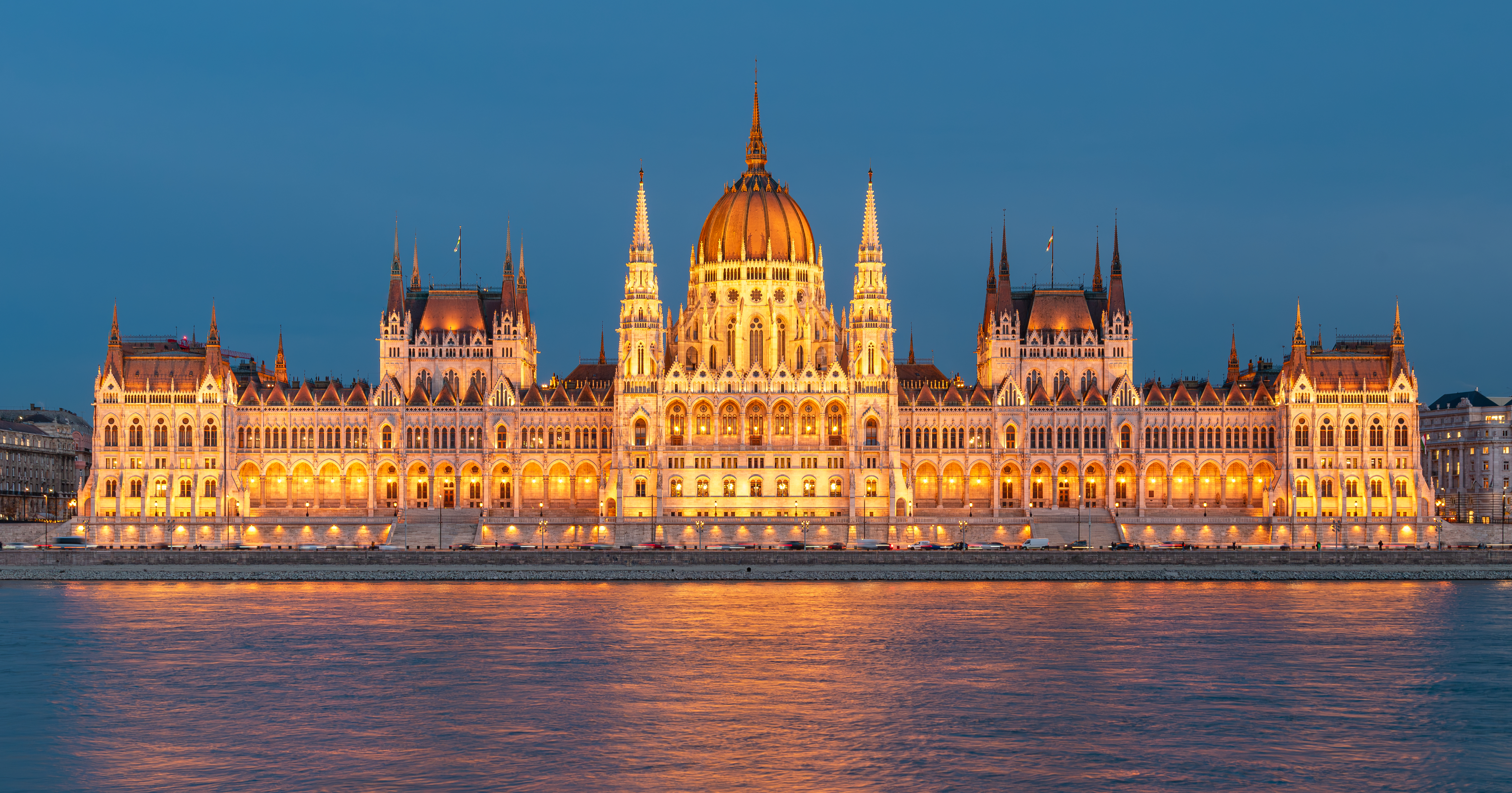
The Hungarian Parliament, completed in 1904

Art Nouveau came into fashion in Budapest by the exhibitions which were held in and around 1896 and organised in connection with the Hungarian Millennium celebrations. Art Nouveau in Hungary (Szecesszió in Hungarian) is a blend of several architectural styles, with a focus on Hungary's specialities. One of the leading Art Nouveau architects, Ödön Lechner (1845–1914), was inspired by Indian and Syrian architecture as well as traditional Hungarian decorative designs. One of his most beautiful buildings in Budapest is the Museum of Applied Arts. Another examples for Art Nouveau in Budapest is the Gresham Palace in front of the Chain Bridge, the Hotel Gellért, the Franz Liszt Academy of Music or Budapest Zoo and Botanical Garden.

It is one of the world's outstanding urban landscapes and illustrates the great periods in the history of the Hungarian capital.

— UNESCO

The second half of the 20th century also saw, under the communist regime, the construction of blocks of flats (panelház), as in other Eastern European countries. In the 21st century, Budapest faces new challenges in its architecture. The pressure towards the high-rise buildings is unequivocal among today's world cities, but preserving Budapest's unique cityscape and its very diverse architecture, along with green areas, forces Budapest to balance between them. The Contemporary architecture has wide margin in the city. Public spaces attract heavy investment by business and government also, so that the city has gained entirely new (or renovated and redesigned) squares, parks and monuments, for example the city central Kossuth Lajos square, Deák Ferenc square and Liberty Square. Numerous landmarks have been created in the last decade in Budapest, like the National Theatre, Palace of Arts, Rákóczi Bridge, Megyeri Bridge, Budapest Airport Sky Court among others, and millions of square meters of new office buildings and apartments. But there are still large opportunities in real estate development in the city.

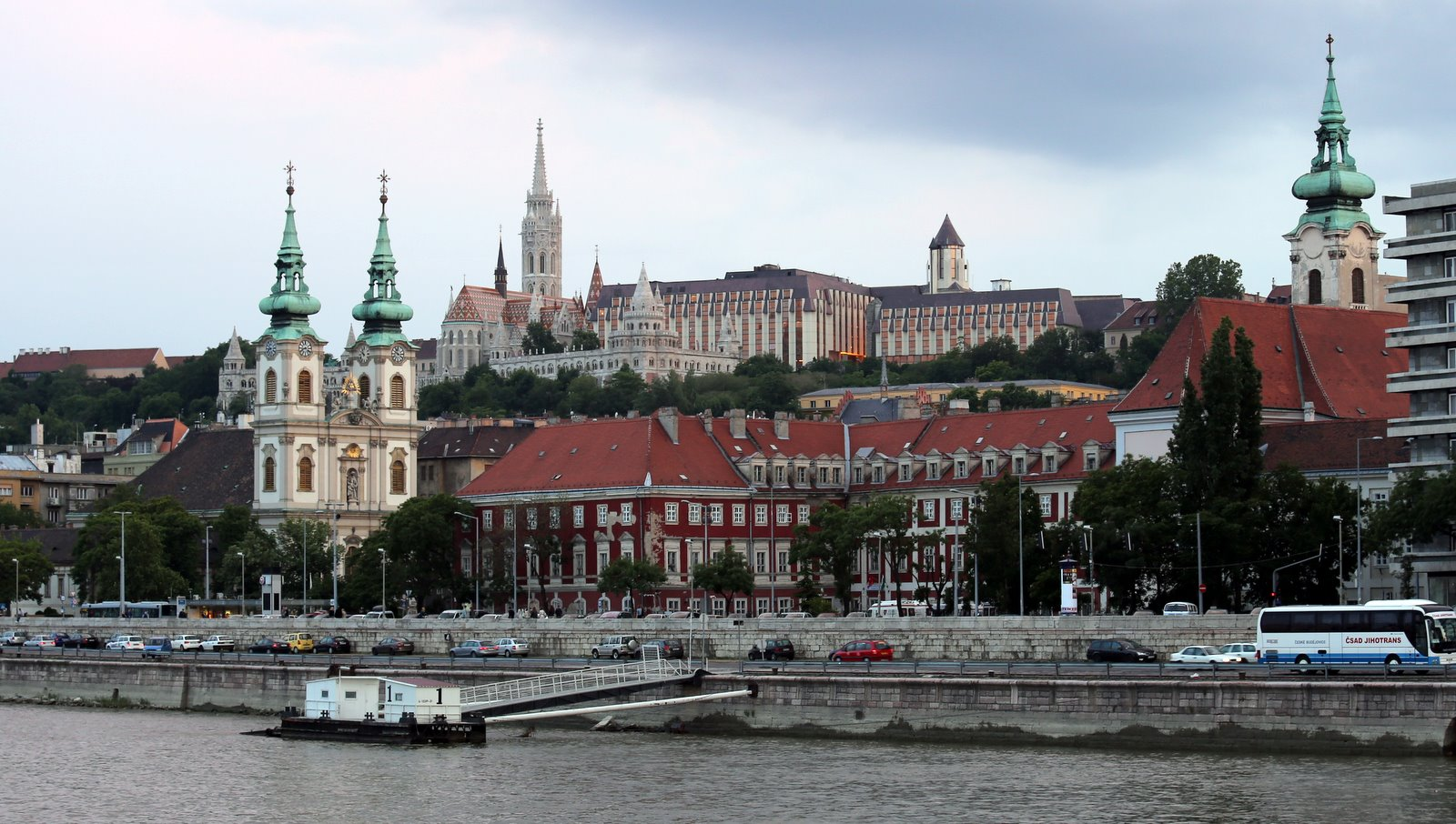
From left: Saint Anne Parish; Matthias Church; Fisherman's Bastion; and Stigmatisation of Saint Francis Church

== Districts ==
Budapest's twenty-three districts overview
Administration		Population	Area and Density	
District	Official name	Official 2013	Km^{2}	People/km^{2}
I	Várkerület	24.528	3,41	7.233
II	Rózsadomb	88.011	36,34	2.426
III	Óbuda-Békásmegyer	123.889	39,69	3.117
IV	Újpest	99.050	18,82	5.227
V	Belváros-Lipótváros	27.342	2,59	10.534
VI	Terézváros	43.377	2,38	18.226
VII	Erzsébetváros	64.767	2,09	30.989
VIII	Józsefváros	85.173	6,85	11.890
IX	Ferencváros	63.697	12,53	4.859
X	Kőbánya	81.475	32,5	2.414
XI	Újbuda	145.510	33,47	4.313
XII	Hegyvidék	55.776	26,67	2.109
XIII	Angyalföld, Göncz Árpád városközpont, Újlipótváros, Vizafogó	118.320	13,44	8.804
XIV	Zugló	123.786	18,15	6.820
XV	Rákospalota, Pestújhely, Újpalota	79.779	26,95	2.988
XVI	Árpádföld, Cinkota, Mátyásföld, Sashalom, Rákosszentmihály	68.235	33,52	2.037
XVII	Rákosmente	78.537	54.83	1.418
XVIII	Pestszentlőrinc-Pestszentimre	94.663	38,61	2.414
XIX	Kispest	62.210	9,38	6.551
XX	Pesterzsébet	63.887	12,18	5.198
XXI	Csepel	76.976	25,75	2.963
XXII	Budafok-Tétény	51.071	34,25	1.473
XXIII	Soroksár	19.982	40,78	501
City of Budapest		1,740,041	525.2	3,313.1
Hungary		9,937,628	93,030	107.2
Source: Eurostat, HSCO

Contemporary Budapest is divided into 23 districts (Hungarian: kerületek, sing.: kerület), each with a mayor and municipal government elected separately from the general municipal government. The districts and the general municipal government have constitutionally and legally defined, non-overlapping areas of competence. Each district has a municipally recognized name, some of which correspond to how locals call that area or neighborhood (e.g., Belváros, V. district; Terézváros, VI. district), others which (e.g., Újbuda, XI. district) are neologisms. Street signs display the district and that neighborhood's colloquial name. The latter are often the names of villages that were gradually annexed to the city (e.g., Sashalom, Budafok) or of superseded administrative units of former boroughs.

After the unification of Buda, Pest, and Óbuda in 1873, Budapest initially had 10 districts. It was during the interwar period that Károly Szendy's 1934-1944 mayoral administration first seriously considered annexing peripheral towns and villages. This only came about, however, after the rise of state communism in Hungary. In 1950, for reasons of social and industrial policy—including the Hungarian Working People's Party's desire to proletarianize the traditionally right-wing suburbs—7 cities with county rights and 16 towns were annexed to the capital to form contemporary Greater Budapest (Hungarian: Nagy-Budapest). This reorganized the city into 22 districts, a number that grew to 23 after Soroksár seceded from Pesterzsébet in 1994. The contemporary city thus consists of 6 districts in Buda, 16 in Pest, and Csepel. Today, districts I., II., XI., and XII. in Buda and V., VI., VII., VIII., and IX. in Pest make up the city centre in its broadest sense, corresponding roughly to the 1873 municipal boundaries.

Budapest's districts are numbered according to three concentric semicircles. The I. district is a small area in central Buda, including the Castle Quarter. District II. is in Buda to the castle's northwest while district III. stretches along the northernmost part of Buda and includes the former Óbuda. District IV. continues this semicircle in northernmost Pest, but the V. district is in the very centre of Pest and inaugurates a new circle that then loops back through Pest to Buda as the VI., VII., VIII., IX., XI., and XII. districts. Districts XIII., XIV., XV., XVI., XVII., XVIII., XIX., XX., XXI., and XXII. form yet another semicircle in outermost Pest. Districts X. and XXIII. form irregularities within the overall pattern.

== Demographics ==
Historical population

Year	Pop.	±%
1784	57,100	—
1870	302,086	+429.0%
1880	402,706	+33.3%
1890	560,079	+39.1%
1900	861,434	+53.8%
1910	1,110,453	+28.9%
1920	1,232,026	+10.9%
1930	1,442,869	+17.1%
1941	1,712,791	+18.7%

Year	Pop.	±%
1949	1,590,316	−7.2%
1960	1,804,606	+13.5%
1970	2,001,083	+10.9%
1980	2,059,226	+2.9%
1990	2,016,681	−2.1%
2001	1,777,921	−11.8%
2011	1,729,040	−2.7%
2022	1,685,342	−2.5%

Source: KSH

Religion in Budapest (2022 census – of those who declared their religion (55.5%)
1. Roman Catholic (40.7%)
2. Calvinist (13.6%)
3. Lutheran (2.80%)
4. Greek Catholic (1.80%)
5. Orthodox (0.50%)
6. Other Christian denomination (4.20%)
7. Jewish (0.50%)
8. Other religion (1.30%)
9. Not religious (34.6%)

Budapest is the most populous city in Hungary and one of the largest cities in the European Union, with a growing number of inhabitants, estimated at 1,763,913 in 2019, whereby inward migration exceeds outward migration. These trends are also seen throughout the Budapest metropolitan area, which is home to 3.3 million people. This amounts to about 34% of Hungary's population. In 2014, the city had a population density of 3,314 people/km^{2} (8,580 people/mi^{2}), rendering it the most densely populated of all municipalities in Hungary. The population density of Elisabethtown-District VII is 30,989/km^{2} (80,260/mi^{2}), which has the highest population density figure in Hungary and one of the highest in the world. For comparison, the density in Manhattan is 25,846/km^{2}.

Budapest is the fourth most "dynamically growing city" by population in Europe, and the Euromonitor predicts a population increase of almost 10% between 2005 and 2030. The European Observation Network for Territorial Development and Cohesion says Budapest's population will increase by 10% to 30% only due to migration by 2050. A constant inflow of migrants in recent years has fuelled population growth in Budapest. Productivity gains and the relatively large economically active share of the population explain why household incomes have increased in Budapest to a greater extent than in other parts of Hungary. Higher incomes in Budapest are reflected in the lower share of expenditure the city's inhabitants allocate to necessary spending such as on food and non-alcoholic drinks.

According to the 2016 microcensus, there were 1,764,263 people living in Budapest in 907,944 dwellings. Some 1.6 million persons from the metropolitan area may be within Budapest's boundaries during working hours, and during special events. This fluctuation in the population is caused by hundreds of thousands of suburban residents who travel to the city for work, education, health care, and special events.

By ethnicity there were 1,697,039 (96.2%) Hungarians, 34,909 (2%) Germans, 16,592 (0.9%) Romani, 9,117 (0.5%) Romanians and 5,488 (0.3%) Slovaks. In Hungary people can declare multiple ethnic identities, hence the sum may exceed 100%. The share of ethnic Hungarians in Budapest (96.2%) is slightly lower than the national average (98.3%) due to the international migration.

According to the 2011 census, 1,712,153 people (99.0%) speak Hungarian, of whom 1,692,815 people (97.9%) speak it as a first language, while 19,338 people (1.1%) speak it as a second language. Other spoken (foreign) languages were: English (536,855 speakers, 31.0%), German (266,249 speakers, 15.4%), French (56,208 speakers, 3.3%) and Russian (54,613 speakers, 3.2%).

According to the same census, 1,600,585 people (92.6%) were born in Hungary, 126,036 people (7.3%) outside Hungary while the birthplace of 2,419 people (0.1%) was unknown. Although only 1.7% of the population of Hungary in 2009 were foreigners, 43% of them lived in Budapest, making them 4.4% of the city's population (up from 2% in 2001). Nearly two-thirds of foreigners living in Hungary were under 40 years old. The primary motivation for this age group living in Hungary was employment.

Budapest is home to one of the most populous Christian communities in Central Europe, numbering 698,521 people (40.4%) in 2011. According to the 2011 census, there were 501,117 (29.0%) Roman Catholics, 146,756 (8.5%) Calvinists, 30,293 (1.8%) Lutherans, 16,192 (0.9%) Greek Catholics, 7,925 (0.5%) Jews and 3,710 (0.2%) Orthodox in Budapest. 395,964 people (22.9%) were irreligious while 585,475 people (33.9%) did not declare their religion. The city is home to the fifth largest Jewish community in Europe.

== Economy ==
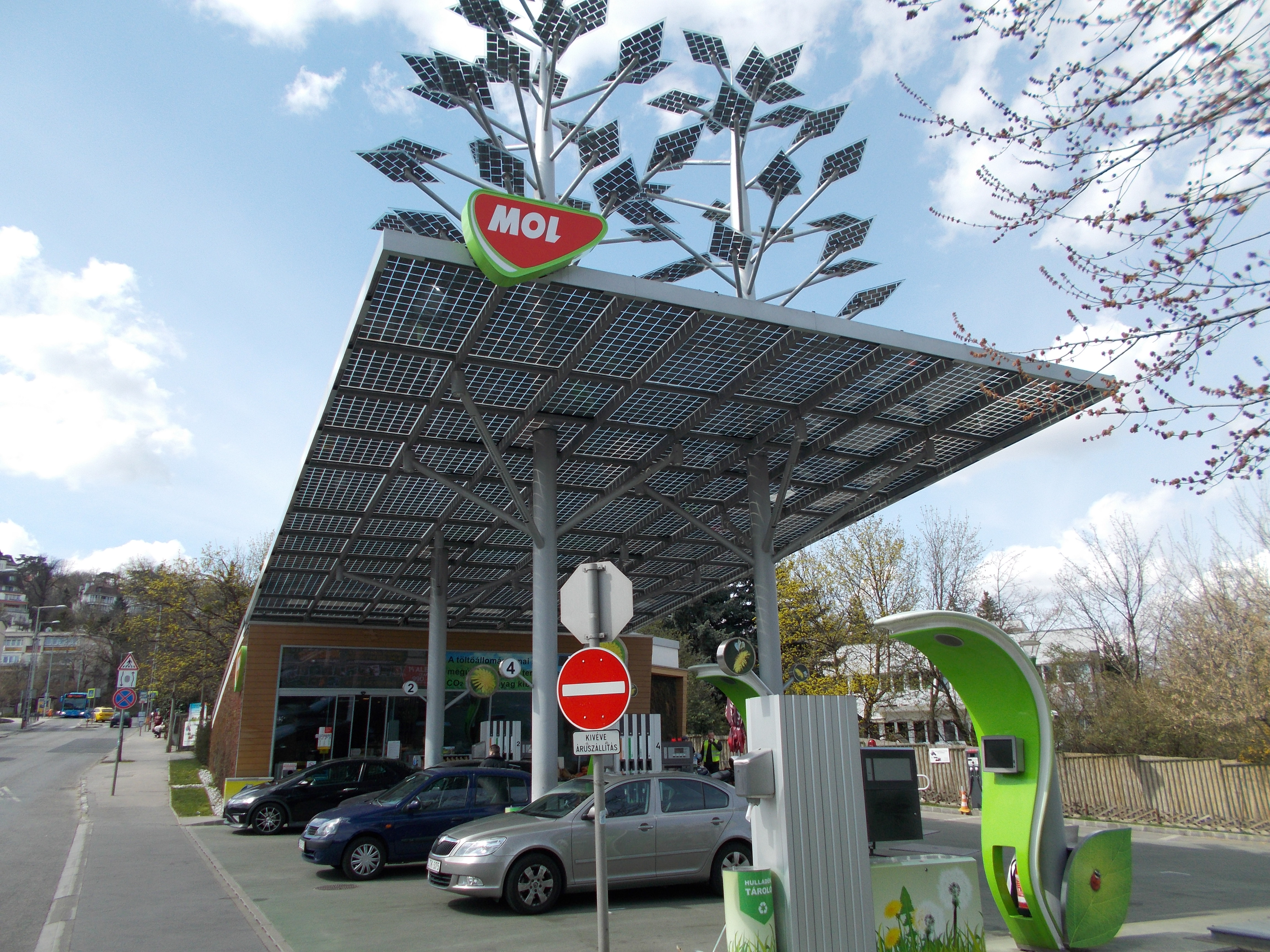
MOL Group solar powered filling station in Budapest

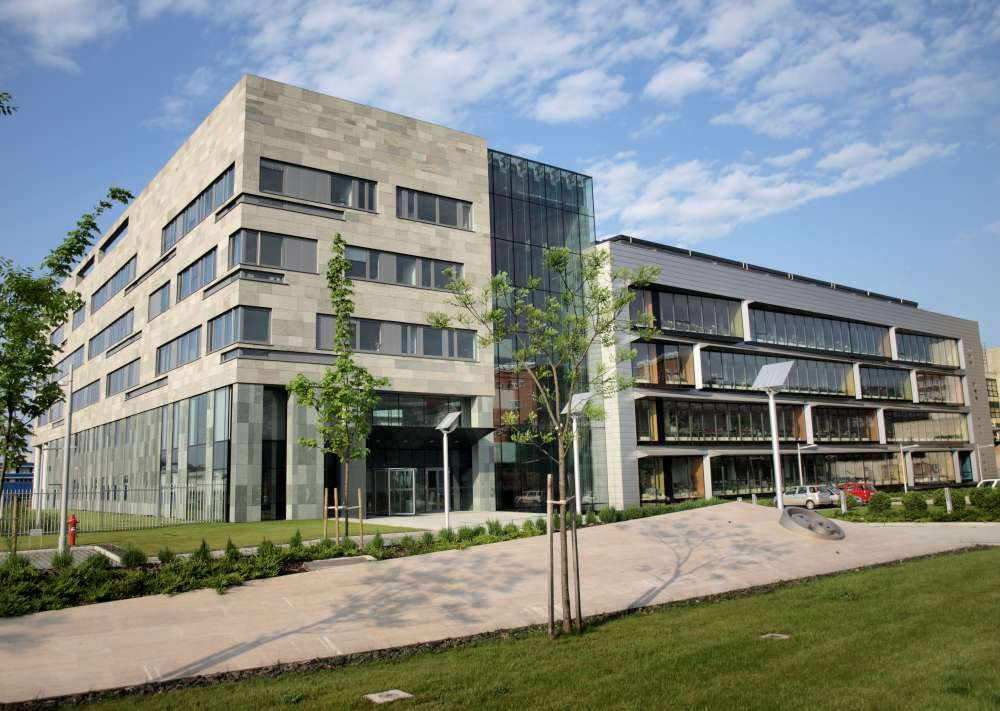
Research and development centre of Richter Gedeon in Budapest

Budapest is a significant economic hub, classified as a Beta + world city in the study by the Globalization and World Cities Research Network and it is the second fastest-developing urban economy in Europe as GDP per capita in the city increased by 2.4 per cent and employment by 4.7 per cent compared to the previous year in 2014. On a national level, Budapest is the primate city of Hungary regarding business and the economy, accounting for 39% of the national income. The city had a gross metropolitan product of more than $100 billion in 2015, making it one of the largest regional economies in the European Union. According to Eurostat GDP, per capita in purchasing power parity is 147% of the EU average in Budapest, which means €37,632 ($42,770) per capita. Budapest is also among the Top 100 GDP performing cities in the world, measured by PricewaterhouseCoopers. The city was named as the 52nd most important business centre in the world in the Worldwide Centres of Commerce Index, ahead of Beijing, São Paulo and Shenzhen and ranking 3rd (out of 65 cities) on the MasterCard Emerging Markets Index. The city is 48th on the UBS The most expensive and richest cities in the world list, standing before cities such as Prague, Shanghai, Kuala Lumpur and Buenos Aires. In a global city competitiveness ranking by the EIU, Budapest stands before Tel Aviv, Lisbon, Moscow and Johannesburg among others.

The city is a major centre for banking and finance, real estate, retailing, trade, transportation, tourism, new media as well as traditional media, advertising, legal services, accountancy, insurance, fashion and the arts in Hungary and regionally. Budapest is home not only to almost all national institutions and government agencies, but also to many domestic and international companies. In 2014 there were 395.804 companies registered in the city. Most of these entities are headquartered in Budapest's Central Business District, in District V and District XIII. The retail market of the city (and the country) is also concentrated in the downtown area, among others, in the two largest shopping centres in Central and Eastern Europe, the 186,000 sqm WestEnd City Center and the 180,000 sqm Arena Plaza.

Budapest has notable innovation capabilities as a technology and start-up hub. Many start-ups are headquartered and begin their business in the city. Some of the best known examples are Prezi, LogMeIn and NNG. Budapest is the highest ranked Central and Eastern European city in the Innovation Cities' Top 100 index. A good indicator of the city's potential for innovation and research, is that the European Institute of Innovation and Technology chose Budapest for its headquarters, along with the UN, whose Regional Representation for Central Europe office is in the city, responsible for UN operations in seven countries. Moreover, the global aspect of the city's research activity is shown through the establishment of the European Chinese Research Institute in the city. Other important sectors also include, natural science research, information technology and medical research, non-profit institutions, and universities. The leading business schools and universities in Budapest, the Budapest Business School, the CEU Business School and Corvinus University of Budapest offer a whole range of courses in economics, finance and management in English, French, German and Hungarian. The unemployment rate in Budapest is by far the lowest within Hungary. It was 2.7%, with many thousands of employed foreign citizens.

Budapest is among the 25 most visited cities in the world, welcoming more than 4.4 million international visitors each year, therefore the traditional and the congress tourism industry also deserve a mention, as they contribute greatly to the city's economy. The capital is home to many convention centres and there are thousands of restaurants, bars, coffee houses and party places, besides a full range of hotels. As regards restaurants, examples can be found of the highest quality Michelin-starred restaurants, such as Onyx, Costes, Tanti and Borkonyha. The city ranked as the most liveable city in Central and Eastern Europe on EIU's quality of life index in 2010.

=== Finance and corporate location ===
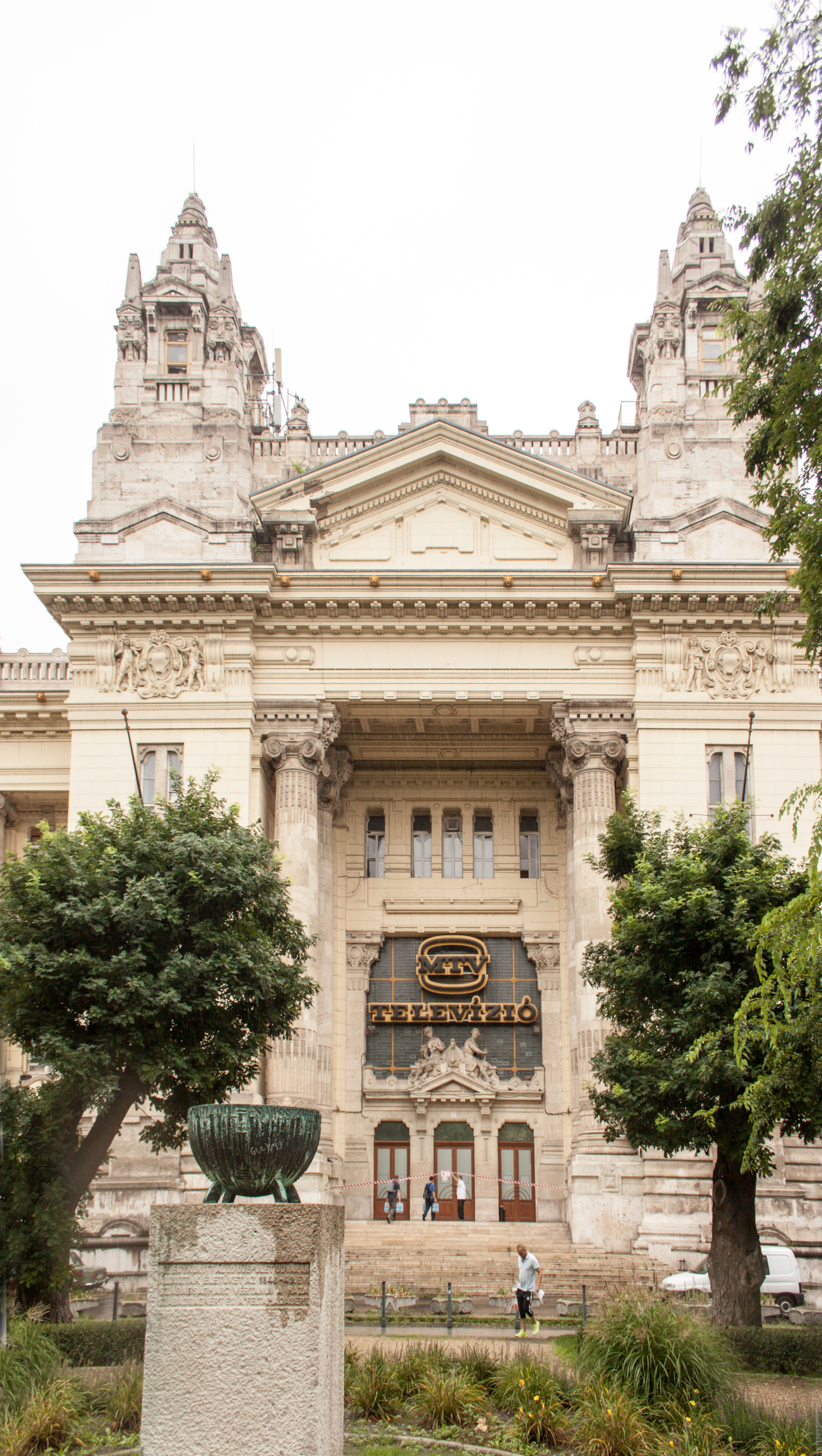
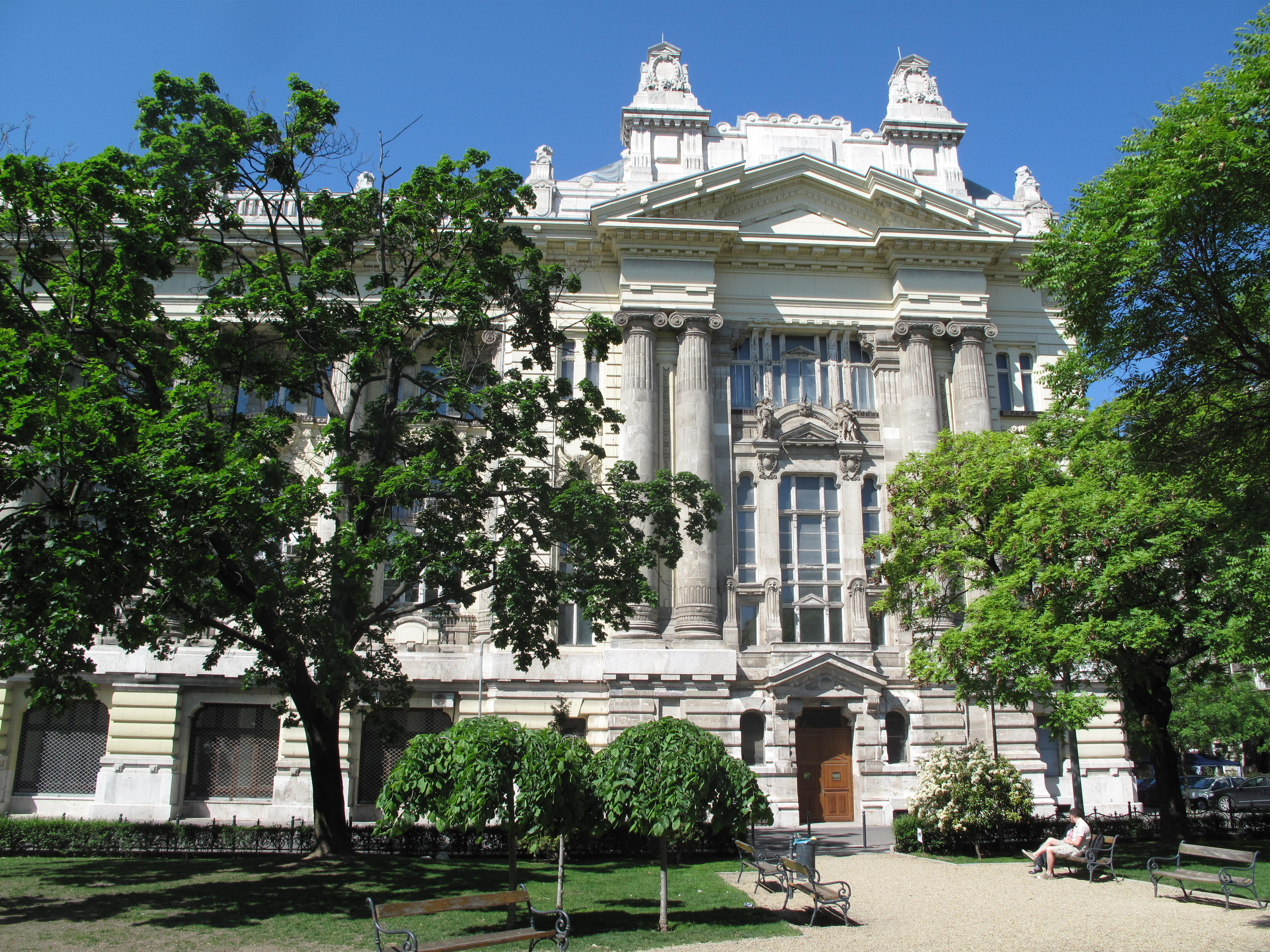
Hungarian Stock Exchange Palace on Liberty Square

The Budapest Stock Exchange, a key institution of publicly offered securities in Hungary and Central and Eastern Europe, is situated in Budapest's CBD at Liberty Square. BSE also trades other securities such as government bonds and derivatives as well as stock options. Large Hungarian multinational corporations headquartered in Budapest are listed on the BSE, for instance the Fortune Global 500 firms MOL Group, the OTP Bank, FHB Bank, Gedeon Richter, Magyar Telekom, CIG Pannonia, Zwack Unicum and more. Nowadays nearly all branches of industry can be found in Budapest. Although there is no particularly special industry in the city's economy, the financial centre role of the city is strong, with nearly 40 major banks being represented in the city including as well as those like Bank of China, KDB Bank and Hanwha Bank, which are unique in the region.

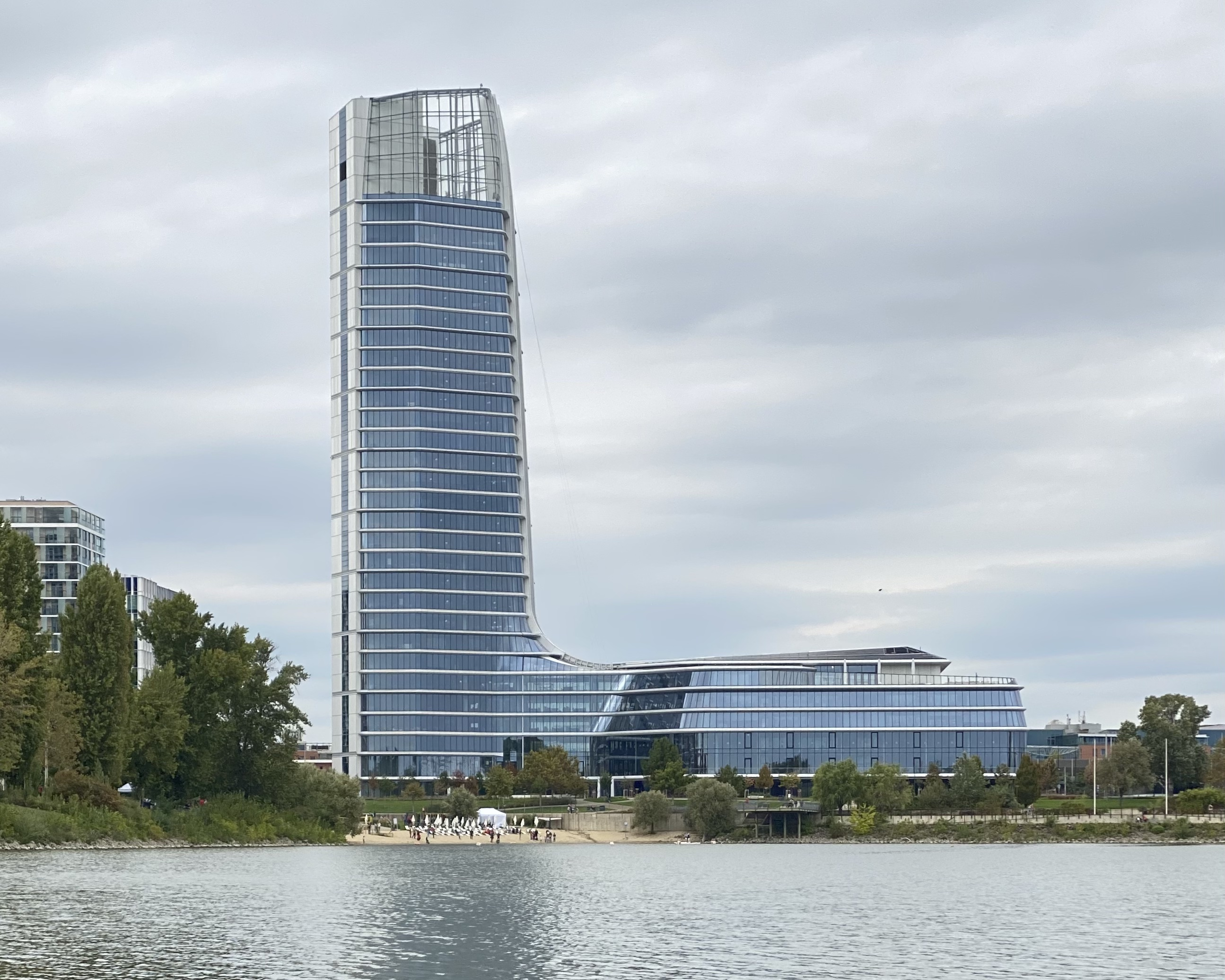
MOL Campus, a neomodern skyscraper and the headquarters of MOL Group

Many international banks and financial service providers also support the financial industry of Budapest, firms such as Citigroup, Morgan Stanley, GE Capital, Deutsche Bank, Sberbank, ING Group, Allianz, KBC Group, UniCredit, Wise (company) and MSCI among others. Another particularly strong industry in the capital city is the biotechnology and pharmaceutical industry. There are also traditionally strong domestic companies in Budapest such as Egis, Gedeon Richter, Chinoin as well as international biotechnology corporations such as Pfizer, Teva, Novartis, Sanofi, which also have R&D and production divisions here. Further high-tech industries, involved in software development and engineering are notable as well. Nokia, Ericsson, Bosch, Microsoft and IBM employ thousands of engineers in research and development in the city. Game design is also strongly represented with headquarters of domestic companies Digital Reality, Black Hole and the studios of Crytek and Gameloft. Apart from the above, there are regional headquarters of global firms such as Alcoa, General Motors, General Electric, ExxonMobil, BP, BT, Flextronics, Panasonic, Huawei, Knorr-Bremse, Liberty Global, Tata Consultancy, Aegon, WizzAir, TriGránit, MVM Group and Graphisoft. There is a base for major international companies including, but not limited to, Nissan CEE, Volvo, Saab and Ford.

== Politics and government ==
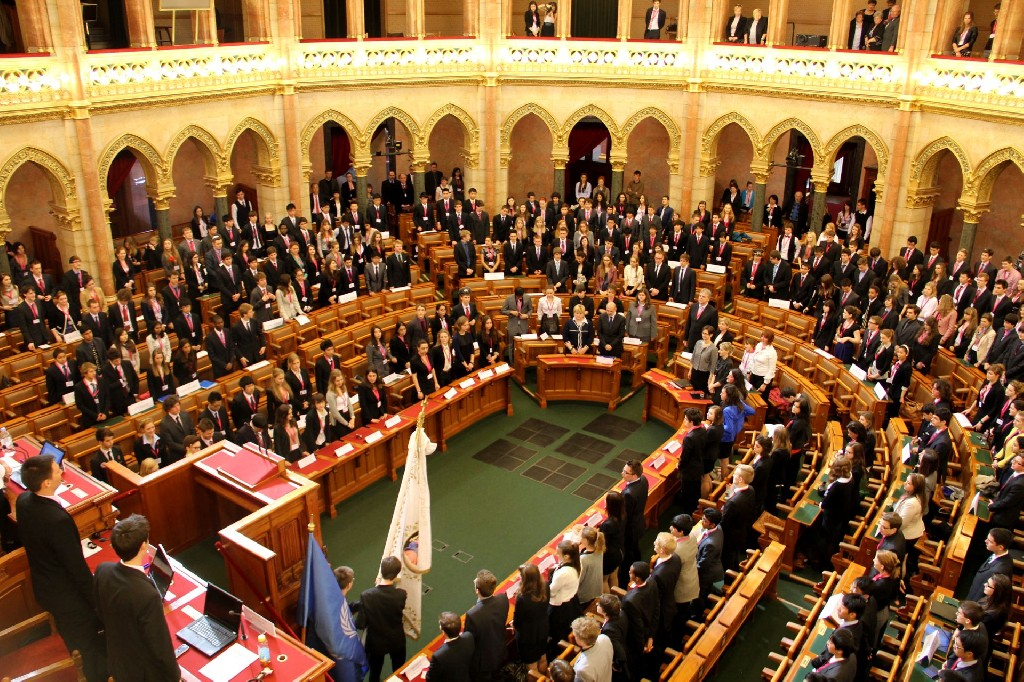
Model United Nations conference in the assembly hall of House of Magnates

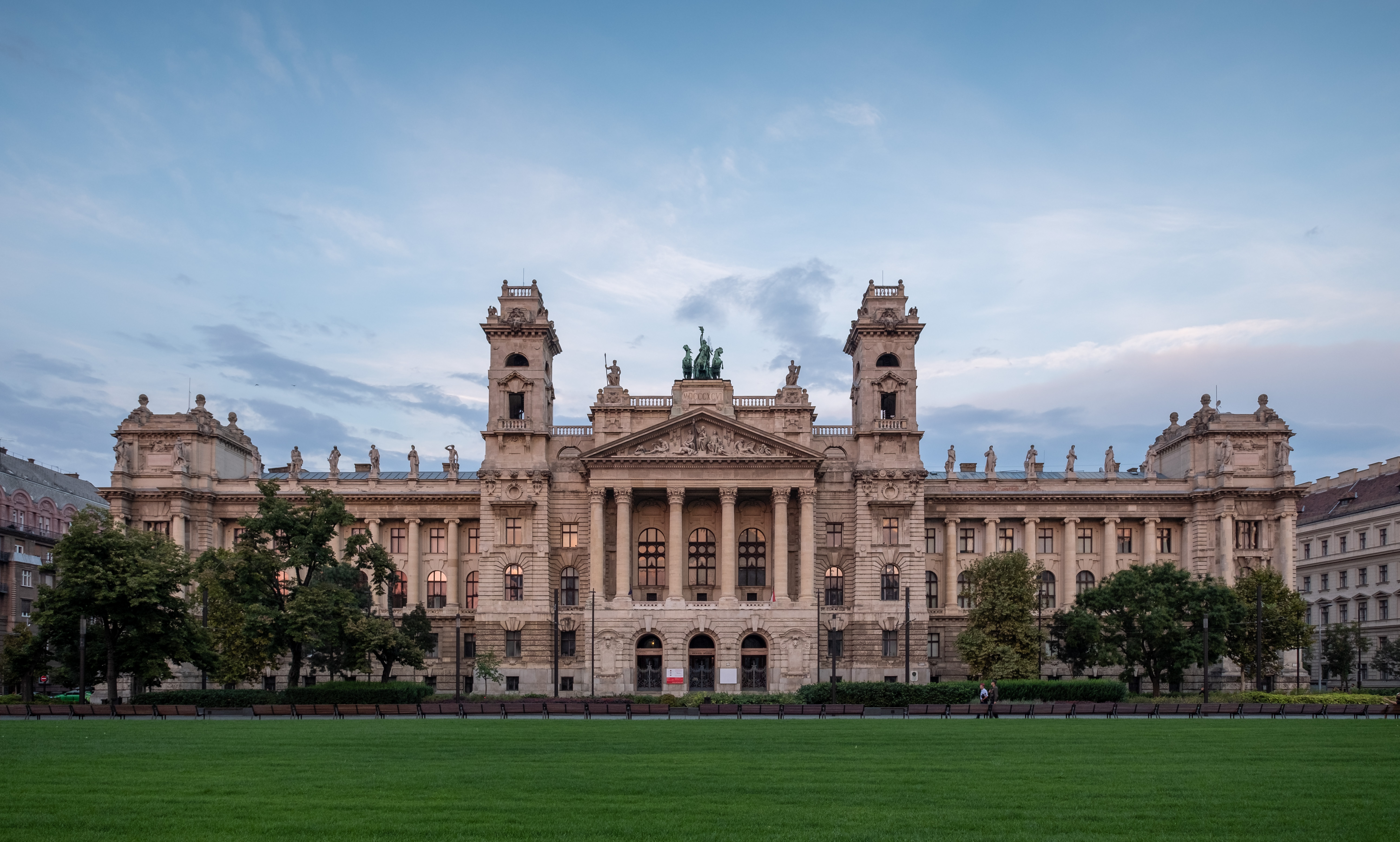
Old building (from 1890) of the Hungarian Royal Curia, that operated as the highest court in the Kingdom of Hungary between 1723 and 1949. Now it houses a museum.

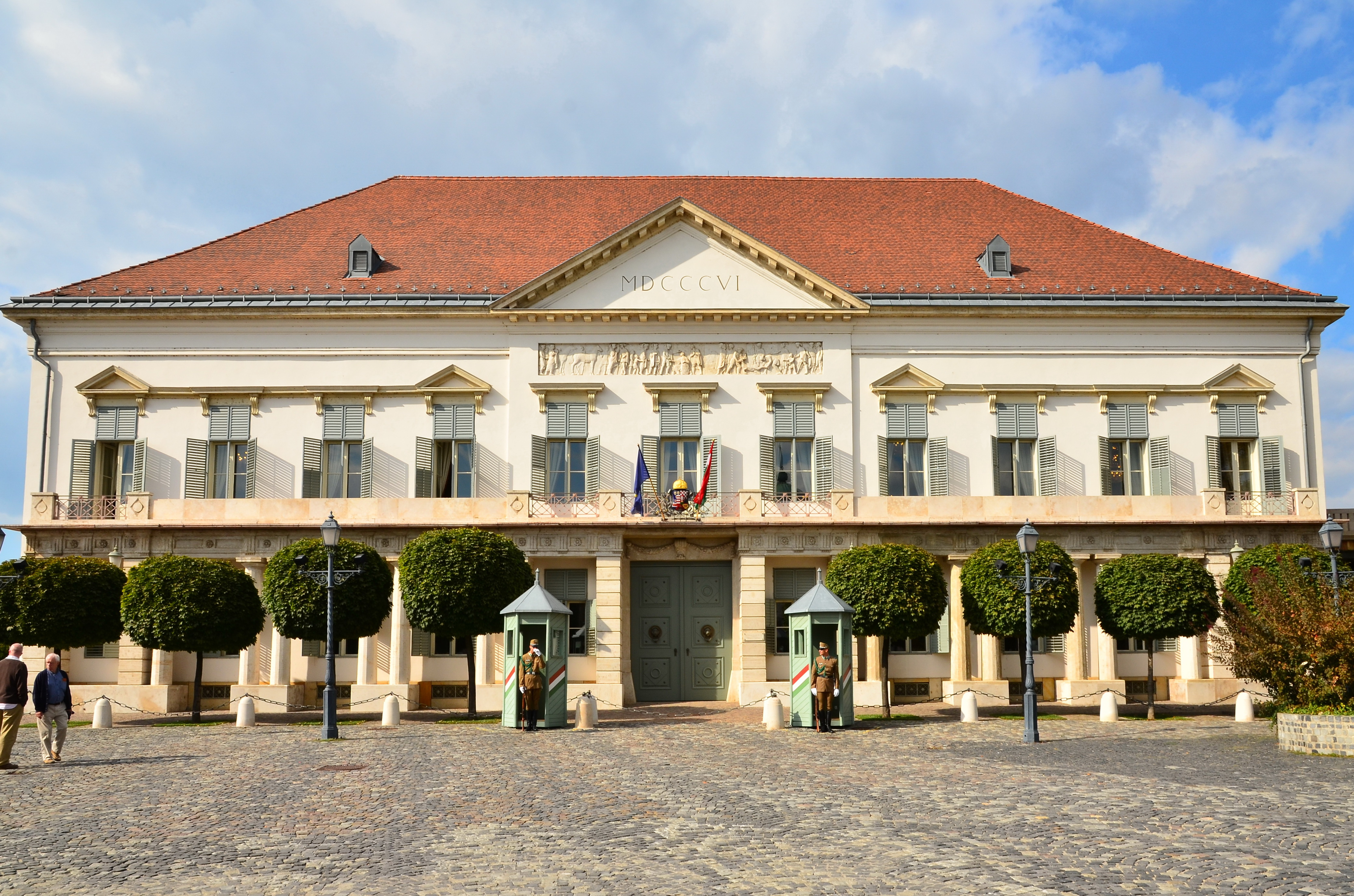
Sándor Palace, the official residence and workspace of the president of Hungary

As the capital of Hungary, Budapest is the seat of the country's national government. The President of Hungary resides at the Sándor Palace in the District I (Buda Castle District), while the office of the Hungarian Prime Minister is in the Carmelite Monastery in the Castle District. Government ministries are all located in various parts of the city, most of them are in the District V, Leopoldtown. The National Assembly is seated in the Hungarian Parliament, which also located in the District V. The President of the National Assembly, the third-highest public official in Hungary, is also seated in the largest building in the country, in the Hungarian Parliament.

Hungary's highest courts are located in Budapest. The Curia (supreme court of Hungary), the highest court in the judicial order, which reviews criminal and civil cases, is located in the District V, Leopoldtown. Under the authority of its president it has three departments: criminal, civil and administrative-labour law departments. Each department has various chambers. The Curia guarantees the uniform application of law. The decisions of the Curia on uniform jurisdiction are binding for other courts. The second most important judicial authority, the National Judicial Council, is also housed in the District V, with the tasks of controlling the financial management of the judicial administration and the courts and giving an opinion on the practice of the president of the National Office for the Judiciary and the Curia deciding about the applications of judges and court leaders, among others. The Constitutional Court of Hungary is one of the highest level actors independent of the politics in the country. The Constitutional Court serves as the main body for the protection of the Constitution, its tasks being the review of the constitutionality of statutes. The Constitutional Court performs its tasks independently. With its own budget and its judges being elected by Parliament it does not constitute a part of the ordinary judicial system. The constitutional court passes on the constitutionality of laws, and there is no right of appeal on these decisions.

Budapest hosts the main and regional headquarters of many international organizations as well, including United Nations High Commissioner for Refugees, Food and Agriculture Organization of the United Nations, European Institute of Innovation and Technology, European Police Academy, International Centre for Democratic Transition, Institute of International Education, International Labour Organization, International Organization for Migration, International Red Cross, Regional Environmental Center for Central and Eastern Europe, Danube Commission and even others. The city is also home to more than 100 embassies and representative bodies as an international political actor.

Environmental issues have a high priority among Budapest's politics. Institutions such as the Regional Environmental Center for Central and Eastern Europe, located in Budapest, are very important assets. To decrease the use of cars and greenhouse gas emissions, the city has worked to improve public transportation, and nowadays the city has achieved a sufficient level of mass transit usage. Budapest's public transportation system works as a network of buses, trolleys, trams and subway. Budapest has an above-average proportion of people commuting on public transport or walking and cycling for European cities. Riding on bike paths is one of the best ways to see Budapest – there are about 180 kilometres (110 miles) of bicycle paths in the city, fitting into the EuroVelo system.

Crime in Budapest is investigated by different bodies. United Nations Office on Drugs and Crime notes in their 2011 Global Study on Homicide that, according to criminal justice sources, the homicide rate in Hungary, calculated based on UN population estimates, was 1.4 in 2009, compared to Canada's rate of 1.8 that same year. The homicide rate in Budapest is below the EU capital cities' average according to WHO also. However, organised crime is associated with the city, the Institute of Defence in a UN study named Budapest as one of the "global epicentres" of illegal pornography, money laundering and contraband tobacco, and also a negotiation centre for international crime group leaders.

=== City governance ===
Composition of the 33 seats in the General Assembly
Fidesz – Hungarian Civic Union	10 seats
Tisza Party	10 seats
DK–MSZP–P	Mayor + 6 seats
VDB–LMP	3 seats
MKKP	3 seats

Budapest has been a metropolitan municipality with a mayor-council form of government since its consolidation in 1873, but Budapest also holds a special status as a county-level government, and also special within that, as holds a capital-city territory status. In Budapest, the central government is responsible for the urban planning, statutory planning, public transport, housing, waste management, municipal taxes, correctional institutions, libraries, public safety, recreational facilities, among others. The Mayor is responsible for all city services, police and fire protection, enforcement of all city and state laws within the city, and administration of public property and most public agencies. Besides, each of Budapest' twenty-three districts has its own town hall and a directly elected council and the directly elected mayor of district.

The Mayor of Budapest is Gergely Karácsony who was elected on 13 October 2019. The mayor and members of General Assembly are elected to five-year terms. The Budapest General Assembly is a unicameral body consisting of 33 members, which consist of the 23 mayors of the districts, 9 from the electoral lists of political parties, plus Mayor of Budapest (the Mayor is elected directly). Each term for the mayor and assembly members lasts five years. Submitting the budget of Budapest is the responsibility of the Mayor and the deputy-mayor in charge of finance. The latest, 2014 budget was approved with 18 supporting votes from ruling Fidesz and 14 votes against by the opposition lawmakers.

== Main sights and tourism ==
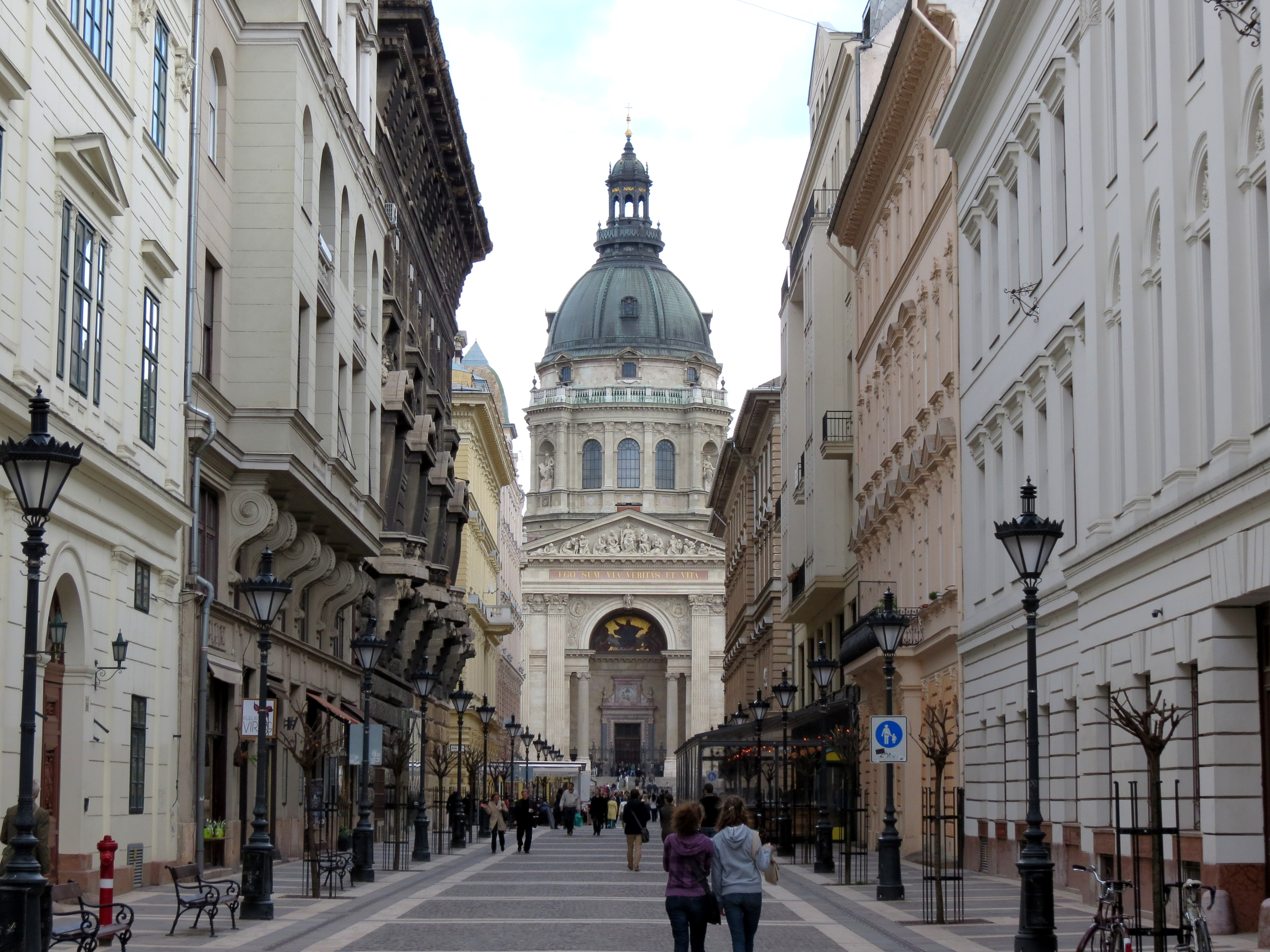
St. Stephen's Basilica

Budapest is widely known for its well-kept pre-war cityscape, with a great variety of streets and landmarks in classical architecture.

The most well-known sight of the capital is the neo-Gothic Parliament, the biggest building in Hungary with its 268 metres (879 ft) length, also holding (since 2001) the Hungarian Crown Jewels.

Saint Stephen's Basilica is the most important religious building of the city, where the Holy Right Hand of Hungary's first king, Saint Stephen is on display as well.

Hungarian cuisine and café culture can be seen and tasted in many places, like Gerbeaud Café, the Százéves, Biarritz, Fortuna, Alabárdos, Arany Szarvas, Gundel and the world-famous Mátyás-pince restaurants and beer bars.

There are Roman remains at the Aquincum Museum, and historic furniture at the Nagytétény Castle Museum, just 2 of 223 museums in Budapest. Another historical museum is the House of Terror, hosted in the building that was the venue of the Nazi Headquarters. The Castle Hill, the River Danube embankments and the whole of Andrássy út have been officially recognized as UNESCO World Heritage Sites.

Castle Hill and the Castle District; there are three churches here, six museums, and a host of interesting buildings, streets and squares. The former Royal Palace is one of the symbols of Hungary – and has been the scene of battles and wars ever since the 13th century. Nowadays it houses two museums and the National Széchenyi Library. The nearby Sándor Palace contains the offices and official residence of the President of Hungary. The seven-hundred-year-old Matthias Church is one of the jewels of Budapest, it is in neo-Gothic style, decorated with coloured shingles and elegant pinnacles. Next to it is an equestrian statue of the first king of Hungary, King Saint Stephen, and behind that is the Fisherman's Bastion, built in 1905 by the architect Frigyes Schulek, the Fishermen's Bastions owes its name to the namesake corporation that during the Middle Ages was responsible of the defence of this part of ramparts, from where opens out a panoramic view of the whole city. Statues of the Turul, the mythical guardian bird of Hungary, can be found in both the Castle District and the Twelfth District.

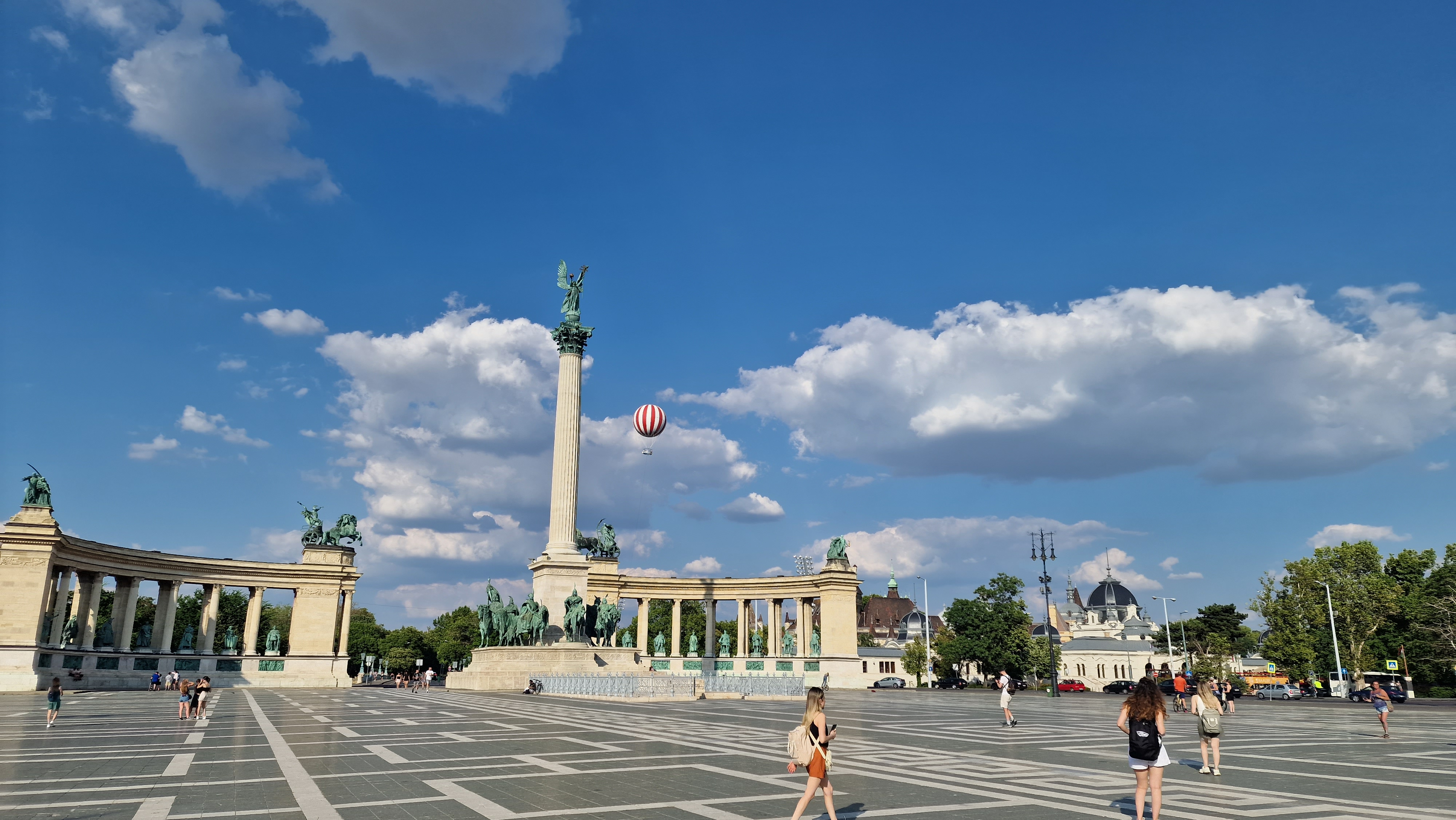
Heroes Square Budapest panoramic view

In Pest, arguably the most important sight is Andrássy út. This Avenue is an elegant 2.5 kilometres (2 miles) long tree-lined street that covers the distance from Deák Ferenc tér to the Heroes Square. This Avenue overlooks many important sites. It is a UNESCO World Heritage Site. As far as Kodály körönd and Oktogon both sides are lined with large shops and flats built close together. Between there and Heroes' Square the houses are detached and altogether grander. Under the whole runs continental Europe's oldest Underground railway, most of whose stations retain their original appearance. Heroes' Square is dominated by the Millenary Monument, with the Tomb of the Unknown Soldier in front. To the sides are the Museum of Fine Arts and the Kunsthalle Budapest, and behind City Park opens out, with Vajdahunyad Castle. One of the jewels of Andrássy út is the Hungarian State Opera House. Statue Park, a theme park with striking statues of the Communist era, is located just outside the main city and is accessible by public transport.

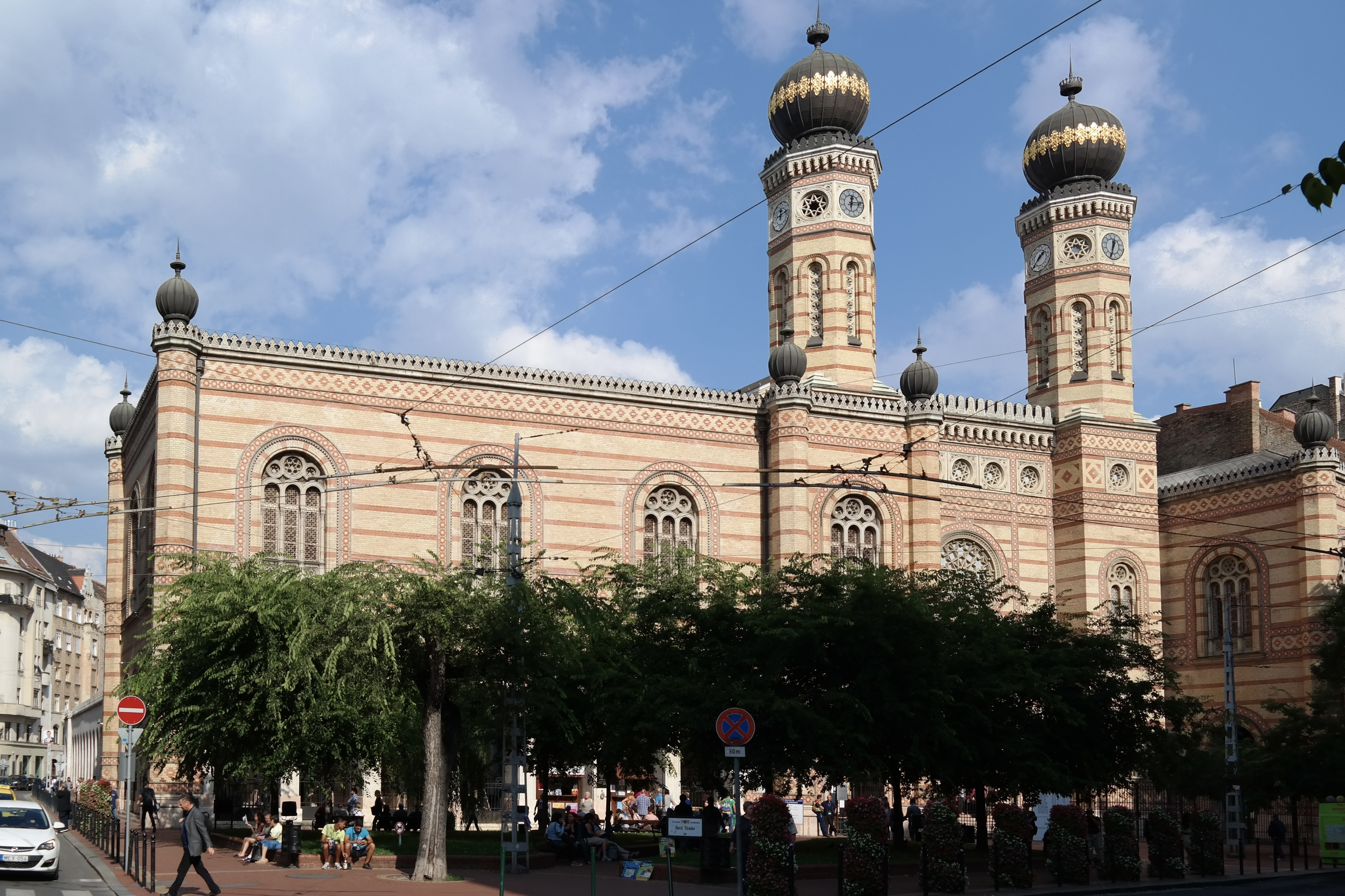
Dohány Street Synagogue, the largest synagogue in Europe

The Dohány Street Synagogue is the largest synagogue in Europe, and the second largest active synagogue in the world. The synagogue is located in the Jewish district taking up several blocks in central Budapest bordered by Király utca, Wesselényi utca, Grand Boulevard and Bajcsy Zsilinszky road. It was built in moorish revival style in 1859 and has a seating capacity of 3,000. Adjacent to it is a sculpture reproducing a weeping willow tree in steel to commemorate the Hungarian victims of the Holocaust.

The city is also home to the largest medicinal bath in Europe (Széchenyi Medicinal Bath) and the third largest Parliament building in the world, once the largest in the world. Other attractions are the bridges of the capital. Seven bridges provide crossings over the Danube, and from north to south are: the Árpád Bridge (built in 1950 at the north of Margaret Island); the Margaret Bridge (built in 1901, destroyed during the war by an explosion and then rebuilt in 1948); the Chain Bridge (built in 1849, destroyed during World War II and then rebuilt in 1949); the Elisabeth Bridge (completed in 1903 and dedicated to the murdered Queen Elisabeth, it was destroyed by the Germans during the war and replaced with a new bridge in 1964); the Liberty Bridge (opened in 1896 and rebuilt in 1989 in Art Nouveau style); the Petőfi Bridge (completed in 1937, destroyed during the war and rebuilt in 1952); the Rákóczi Bridge (completed in 1995). Most remarkable for their beauty are the Margaret Bridge, the Chain Bridge and the Liberty Bridge. The world's largest panorama photograph was created in (and of) Budapest in 2010.

Tourists visiting Budapest can receive free maps and information from the nonprofit Budapest Festival and Tourism Center at its info-points. The info centres also offer the Budapest Card which allows free public transit and discounts for several museums, restaurants and other places of interest. Cards are available for 24-, 48- or 72-hour durations. The city is also well known for its ruin bars both day and night.

=== Parks and gardens ===
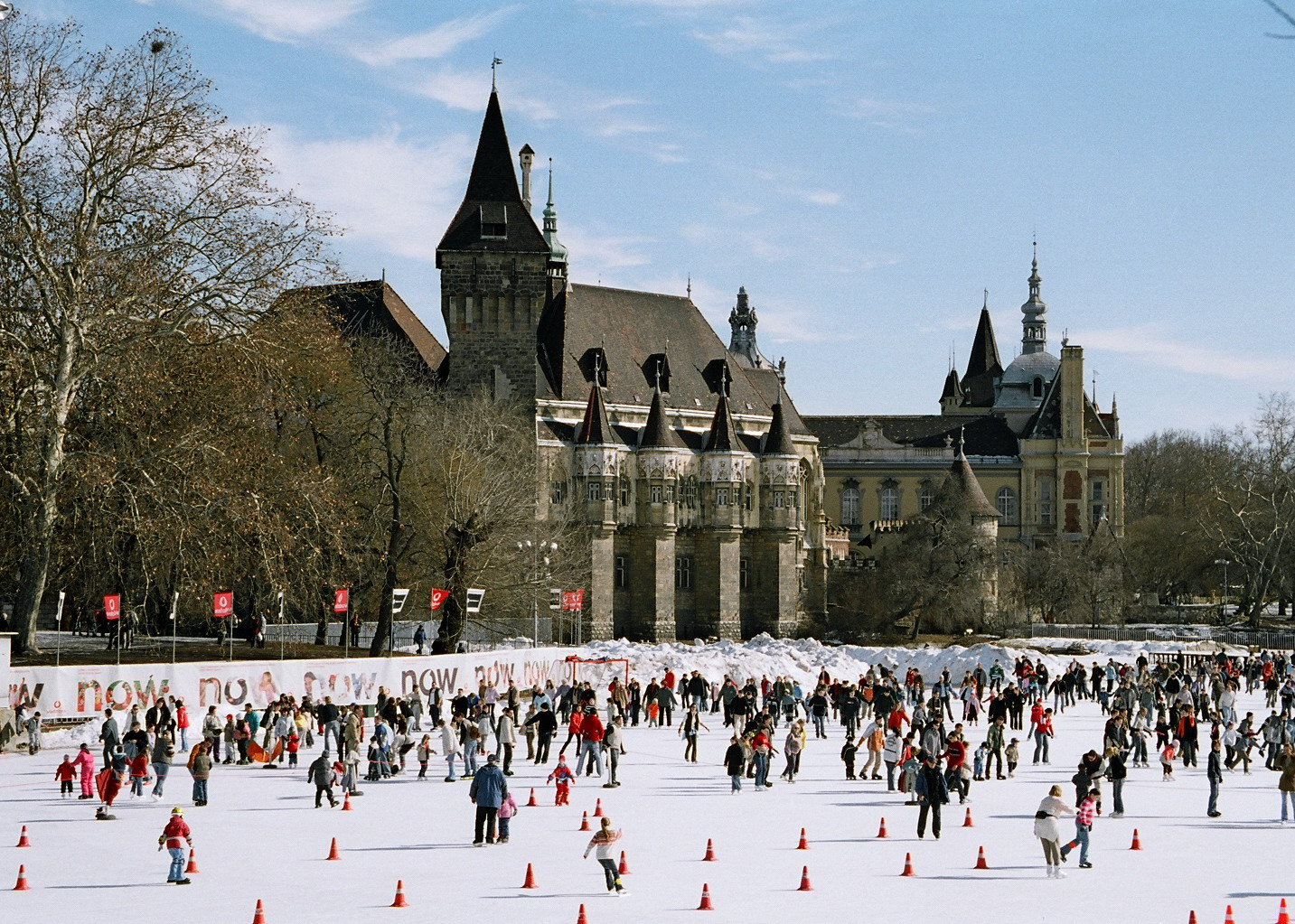
The City Park Ice Rink, located in the City Park; the Vajdahunyad Castle is in the background.

Budapest has many municipal parks and most have playgrounds for children and seasonal activities like skating in the winter and boating in the summer. Access from the city centre is quick and easy with the Millennium Underground. Budapest has a complex park system, with various lands operated by the Budapest City Gardening Ltd. The wealth of greenspace afforded by Budapest's parks is further augmented by a network of open spaces containing forest, streams, and lakes that are set aside as natural areas which lie not far from the inner city, including the Budapest Zoo and Botanical Garden (established in 1866) in the City Park. The most notable and popular parks in Budapest are the City Park which was established in 1751 (302 acres) along with Andrássy Avenue, the Margaret Island in the Danube (238 acres or 96 hectares), the People's Park, the Római Part, and the Kopaszi Dam.

The Buda Hills also offer a variety of outdoor activities and views. A place frequented by locals is Normafa, offering activities for all seasons. With a modest ski run, it is also used by skiers and snowboarders – if there is enough snowfall in winter.

=== Islands ===
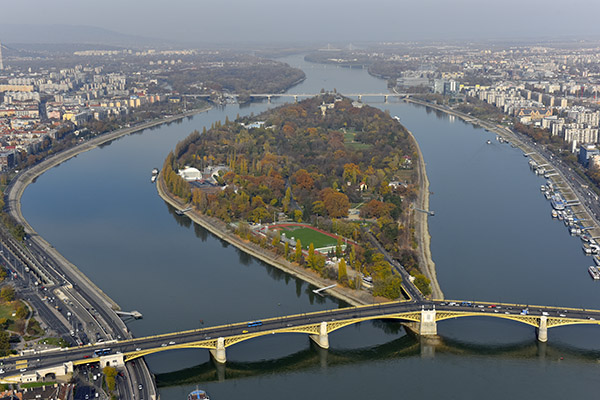
Aerial panorama with Margaret Island

A number of islands can be found on the Danube in Budapest:

- Margaret Island (Hungarian: Margit-sziget [ˈmɒrɡit.siɡɛt]) is a 2.5 km (1.6 mi) long island and 0.965 square kilometres (238 acres) in area. The island mostly consists of a park and is a popular recreational area for tourists and locals alike. The island lies between Margaret Bridge (south) and Árpád Bridge (north). Dance clubs, swimming pools, an aqua park, athletic and fitness centres, bicycle and running tracks can be found around the island. During the day the island is occupied by people doing sports, or just resting.
- Csepel Island (Hungarian: Csepel-sziget [ˈt͡ʃɛpɛlsiɡɛt]) is the largest island of the River Danube in Hungary. It is 48 km (30 mi) long; its width is 6 to 8 km (4 to 5 mi) and its area comprises 257 km^{2} (99 sq mi). However, only the northern tip of the island is inside the city limits.
- Hajógyári Island (Hungarian: Hajógyári-sziget [ˈhɒjoːɟaːrisiɡɛt]), also known as Óbuda Island (Hungarian: Óbudai-sziget), is a human-made island located in the third district. This island hosts many activities such as: wake-boarding, jet-skiing during the day, and dance clubs during the night. This is the island where the famous Sziget Festival takes place, hosting hundreds of performances per year. Around 400,000 visitors attended the last festival. Many building projects are taking place to make this island into one of the biggest entertainment centres of Europe. The plan is to build apartment buildings, hotels, casinos and a marina.
- Molnár Island (Hungarian: Molnár-sziget) is an island in the channel of the Danube that separates Csepel Island from the east bank of the river.

The islands of Palotai Island, Nép Island, and Háros Island also formerly existed within the city, but have been joined to the mainland.

The Ínség Rock (Hungarian: Ínség-szikla) is a reef in the Danube close to the shore under the Gellért Hill. It is only exposed during drought periods when the river level is very low.

Just outside the city boundary to the north lies the large Szentendre Island (Hungarian: Szentendrei-sziget) and the much smaller Lupa Island (Hungarian: Lupa-sziget).

=== Spas ===
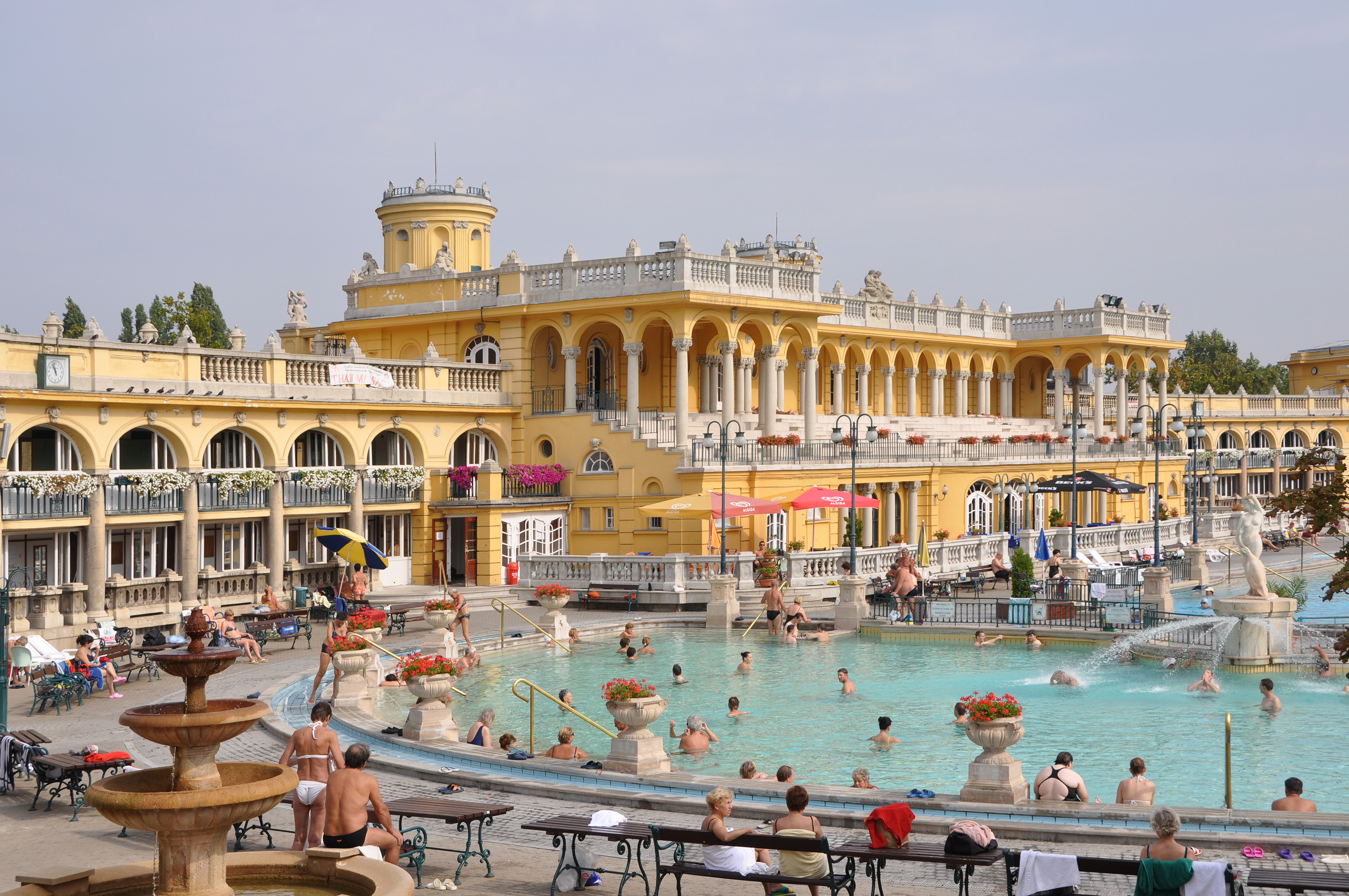
Széchenyi Thermal Bath in the City Park

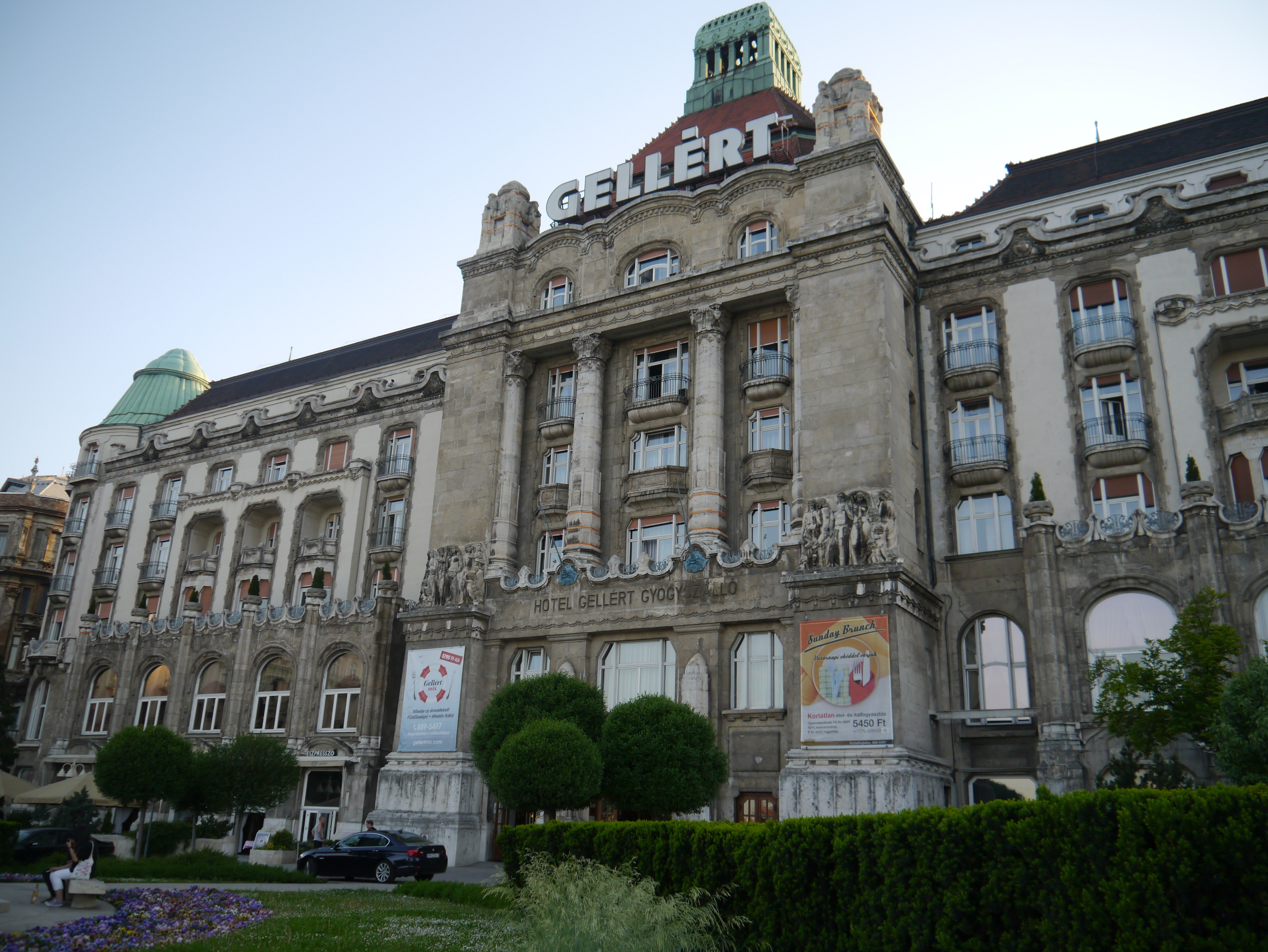
Gate of the Gellért Spa

One of the reasons the Romans first colonised the area immediately to the west of the River Danube and established their regional capital at Aquincum (now part of Óbuda, in northern Budapest) is so that they could use and enjoy the thermal springs. There are still ruins visible today of the enormous baths that were built during that period. The new baths that were constructed during the Turkish period (1541–1686) served both bathing and medicinal purposes, and some of these are still in use to this day.

Budapest gained its reputation as a city of spas in the 1920s, following the first realisation of the economic potential of the thermal waters in drawing in visitors. Indeed, in 1934 Budapest was officially ranked as a "City of Spas". Today, the baths are mostly frequented by the older generation, as, with the exception of the "Magic Bath" and "Cinetrip" water discos, young people tend to prefer the lidos which are open in the summer.

Construction of the Király Baths started in 1565, and most of the present-day building dates from the Turkish period, including most notably the fine cupola-topped pool.

The Rudas Baths are centrally placed – in the narrow strip of land between Gellért Hill and the River Danube – and also an outstanding example of architecture dating from the Turkish period. The central feature is an octagonal pool over which light shines from a 10 metres (33 ft) diameter cupola, supported by eight pillars.

The Saint Gellért Medicinal Baths and Hotel were built in 1918, although there had previously been medicinal baths on the site and, earlier, in the Middle Ages a hospital. In 1927, the Baths were extended to include the wave pool, and the effervescent bath was added in 1934. The interior of the hotel was largely destroyed during the January 1945 bombing raids but was later restored, and its Art Nouveau interior includes colourful mosaics, marble columns, stained glass windows and statues. The complex closed in 2025 for a major renovation, with a scheduled reopening in 2028.

The Lukács Baths are also in Buda and are also Turkish in origin, although they were only revived at the end of the 19th century. This was also when the spa and treatment centre were founded. There is still something of an atmosphere of fin-de-siècle about the place, and all around the inner courtyard there are marble tablets recalling the thanks of patrons who were cured there. Since the 1950s it has been regarded as a centre for intellectuals and artists.

The Széchenyi Baths are one of the largest bathing complexes in all Europe, and the only "old" medicinal baths to be found in the Pest side of the city. The indoor medicinal baths date from 1913 and the outdoor pools from 1927. There is an atmosphere of grandeur about the whole place with the bright, largest pools resembling aspects associated with Roman baths, the smaller bath tubs reminding one of the bathing culture of the Greeks, and the saunas and diving pools borrowed from traditions emanating in northern Europe. The three outdoor pools (one of which is a fun pool) are open all year, including winter. Indoors there are over ten separate pools, and a whole host of medical treatments is also available. The Szécheny Baths are built in modern Renaissance style.

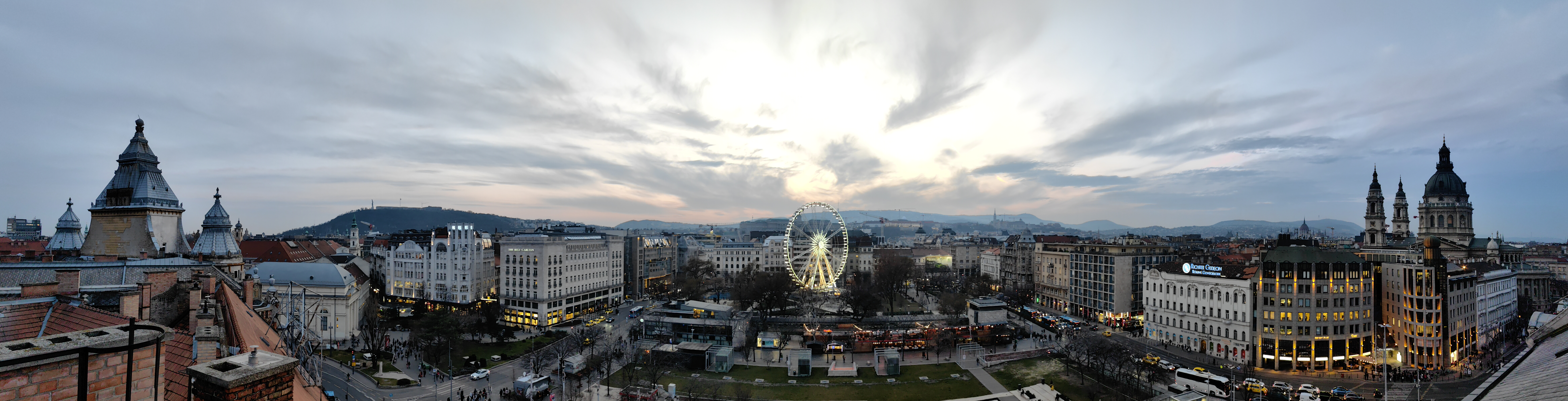
Panorama of Budapest with Gellért Hill, Liberty Statue, Budapest Eye, Buda Castle, Matthias Church, Parliament, St. Stephen's Basilica

== Infrastructure and transportation ==
=== Airport ===
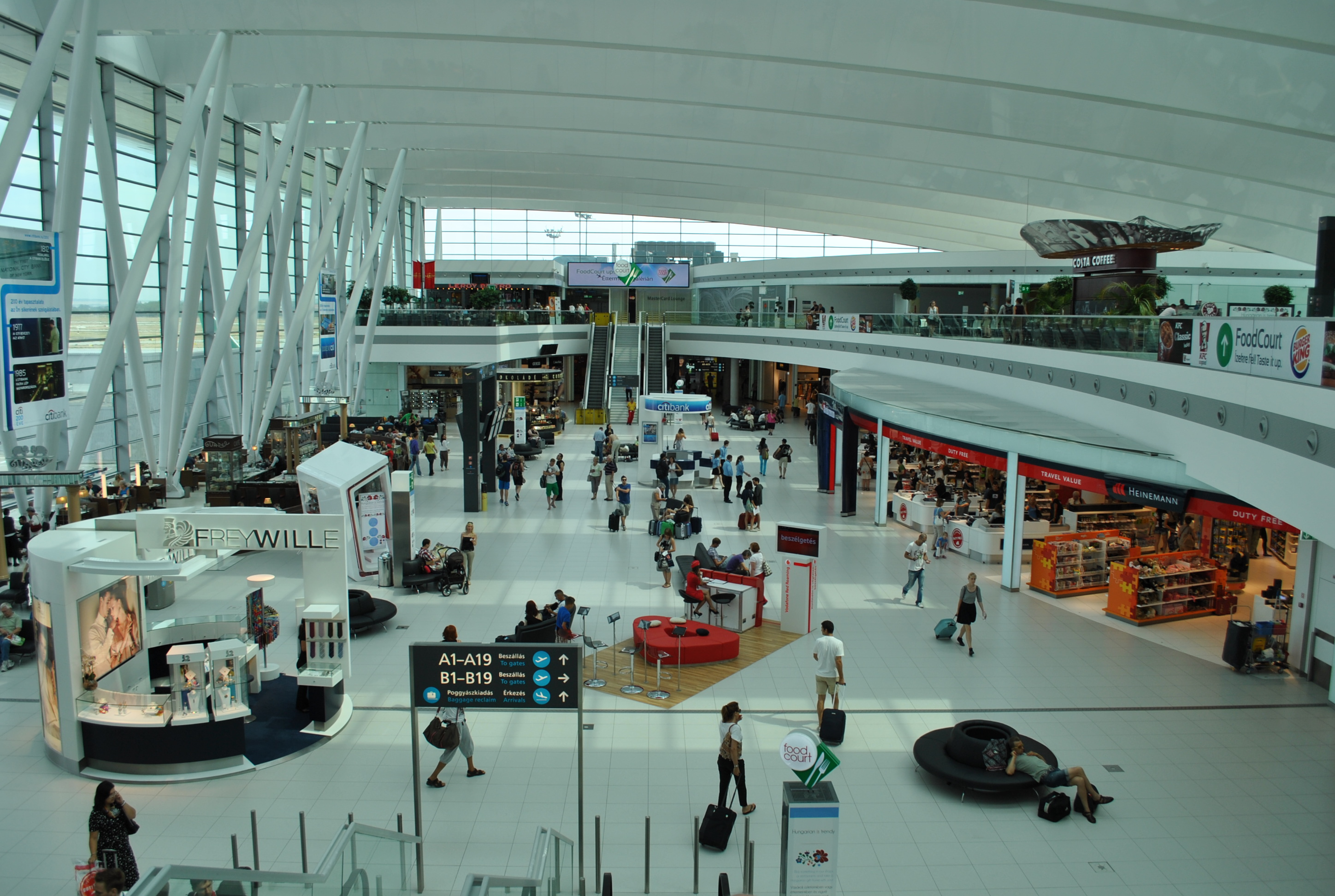
Budapest International Airport arrivals and departures lounge between terminal 2A and 2B, named SkyCourt

Budapest is served by Budapest Ferenc Liszt International Airport (BUD) (named after Franz Liszt, the notable Hungarian composer), one of the busiest airports in Central and Eastern Europe, located 16 kilometres (9.9 mi) east-southeast of the centre of Budapest, in the District XVIII. The airport offers international connections among all major European cities, and also to North America, Africa, Asia and the Middle East. As Hungary's busiest airport, it handles nearly all of the country's air passenger traffic. Budapest Liszt Ferenc handled around 250 scheduled flights daily in 2013, and an ever-rising number of charters. London, Brussels, Frankfurt, Munich, Paris, and Amsterdam are the busiest international connections respectively, while Toronto, Montreal, Dubai, Doha and Alicante are the most unusual in the region. Today the airport serves as a base for Ryanair, Wizz Air, Budapest Aircraft Service, LOT Polish Airlines and Smartwings Hungary among others. The airport is accessible via public transportation from the city centre by the Metro line 3 and then the airport bus 200E and 100E.

As part of a strategic development plan, €561 million have been spent on expanding and modernising the airport infrastructure until December 2012. Most of these improvements are already completed, the postponed ones are the new cargo area and new piers for terminal 2A and 2B, but these development are on standby also, and will start immediately, when the airport traffic will reach the appropriate level. SkyCourt, the newest, state-of-the-art building between the 2A and 2B terminals with 5 levels. Passenger safety checks were moved here along with new baggage classifiers and the new Malév and SkyTeam business lounges, as well as the first MasterCard lounge in Europe.

=== Public transportation ===
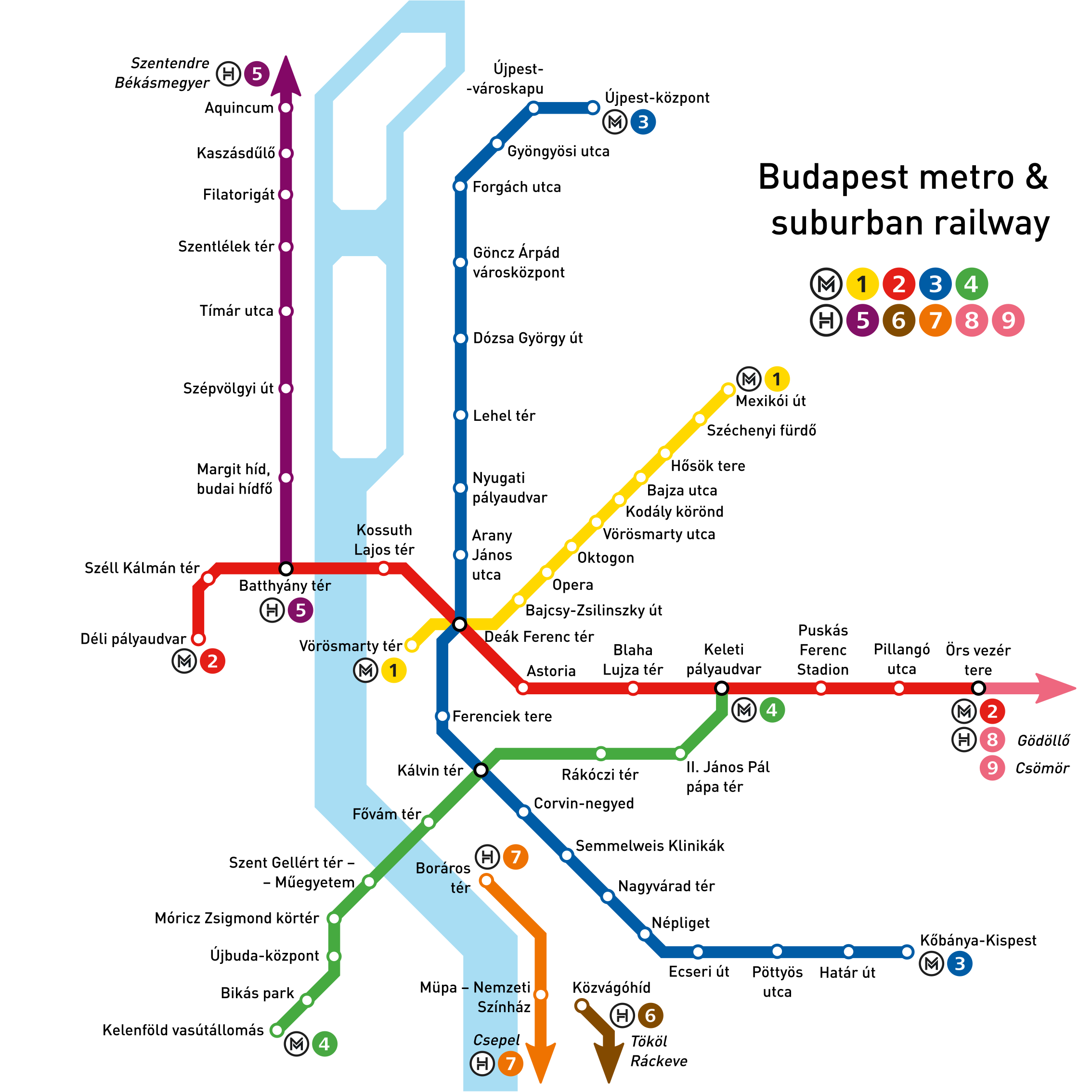
Budapest metro and rapid transit network within the city and to suburbs

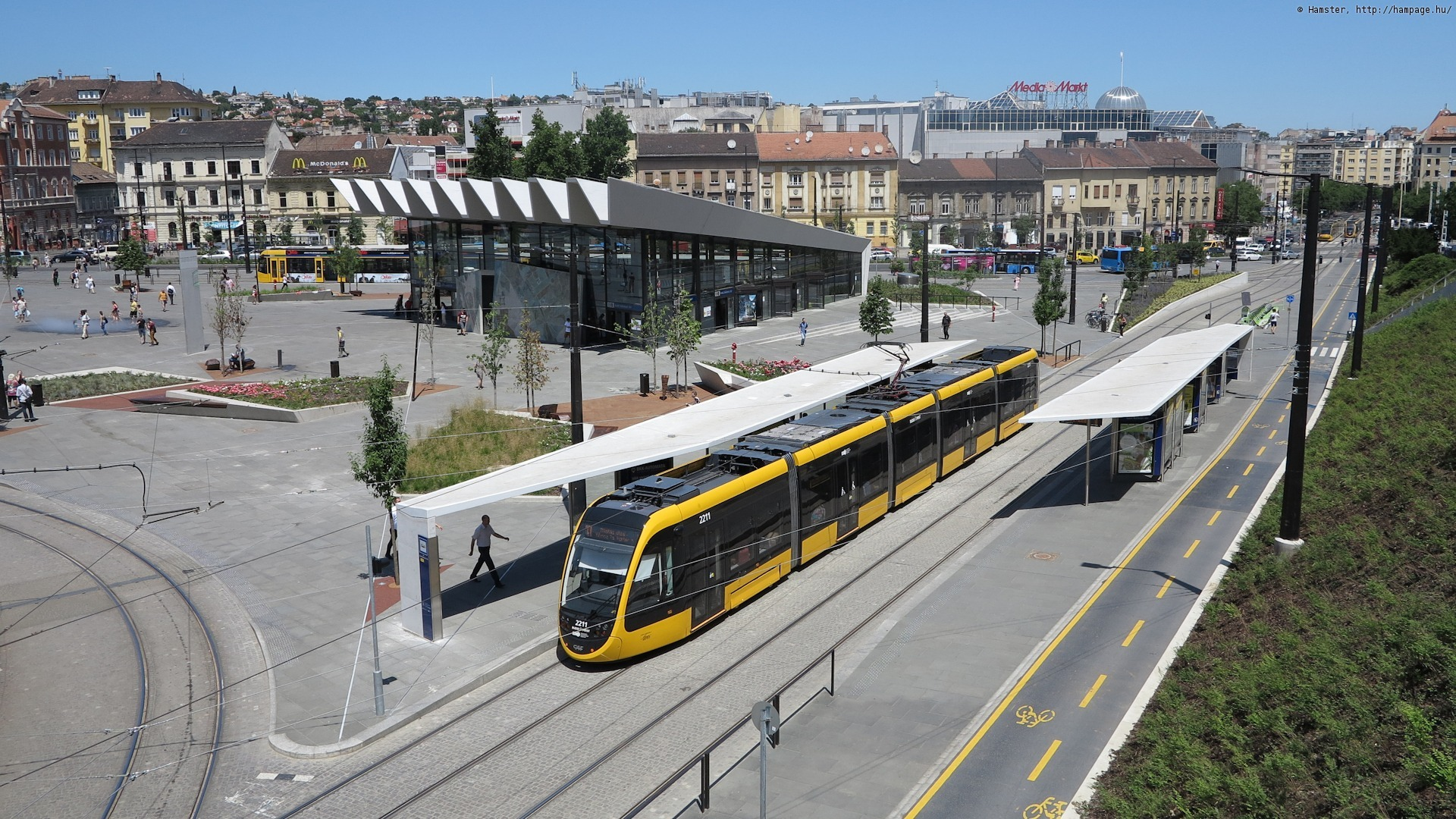
CAF Tram on Line 17 at Széll Kálmán Square

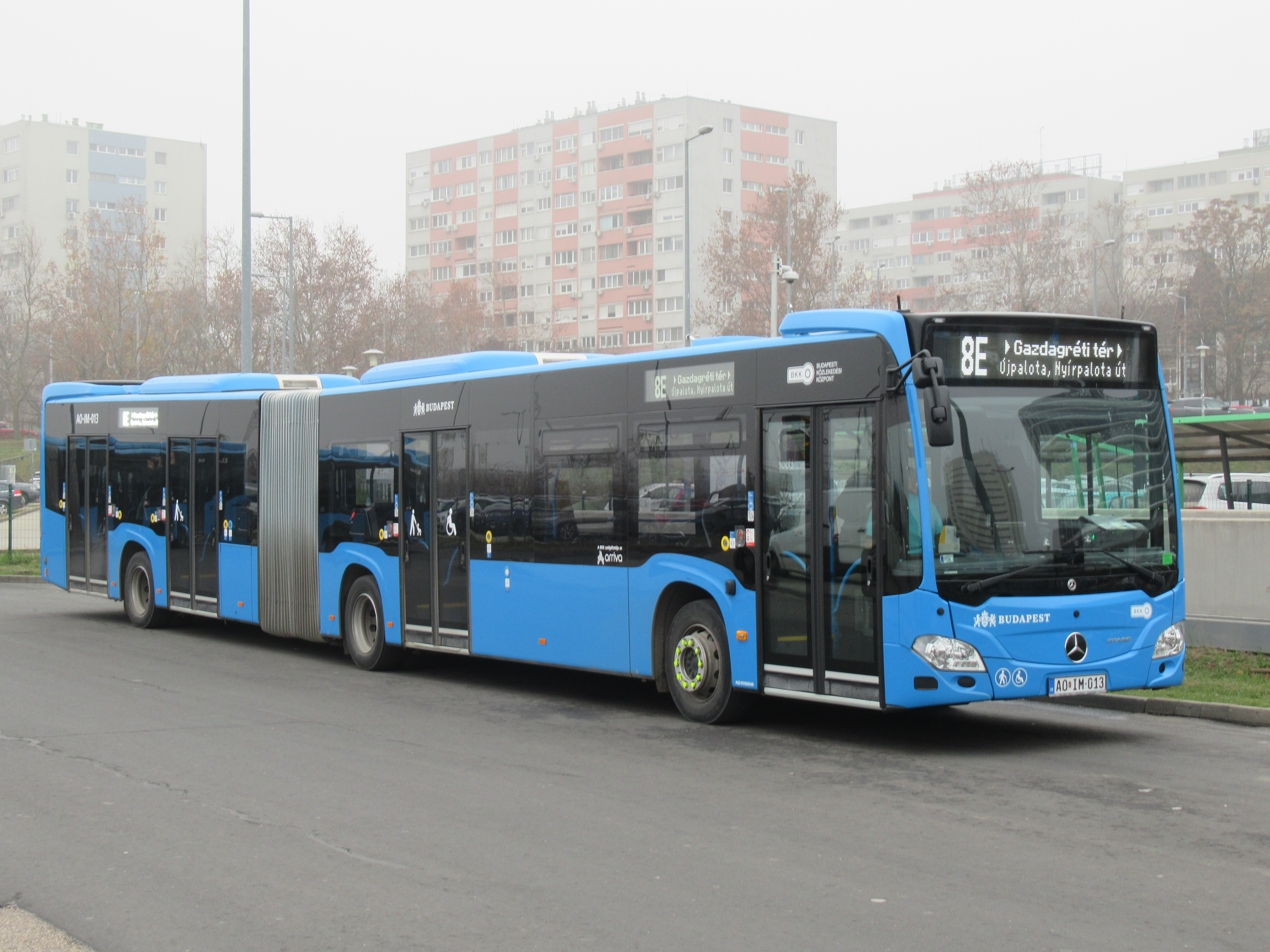
A Mercedes-Benz Citaro C2G articulated bus in Budapest on Line 8E operated by BKK-BKV

Public transit in Budapest is provided by the Centre for Budapest Transport (BKK, Budapesti Közlekedési Központ), one of the largest transportation authorities in Europe. BKK operates 4 metro lines (including the historic Line 1, the oldest underground railway in continental Europe), 5 suburban railway lines, 33 tram lines, 15 trolleybus lines, 264 bus lines (including 40 night routes), 4 boat services, and BuBi, a smart bicycle sharing network. On an average weekday, BKK lines transports 3.9 million riders; in 2011, it handled a total of 1.4 billion passengers. In 2014, the 65% of the passenger traffic in Budapest was by public transport and 35% by car. The aim is 80%–20% by 2030 in accordance with the strategy of BKK.

People aged 65 and over and under 14 travel free.

The development of an intelligent transportation system in the city is progressing, including the application of smart traffic lights that are GPS and computer controlled. Computers give priority to the GPS connected public transport vehicles automatically, and the traffic is measured and analyzed on the roads. Drivers are also informed about the expected travel time and traffic by intelligent displays (EasyWay project). Public transport users are immediately notified of any changes in public transport online, on smartphones and on PIDS displays. Users can keep track of changes in traffic and road management in real-time online and via smartphones through the BKK Info, and with the Futár PIDS system, while the continuous introducing of integrated e-ticket system is anticipated to help the measurement of passenger numbers on each line and the intelligent control of service frequency.

The development of Futár, the citywide real-time passenger information system and real-time route planner is finished already and now all of the public transport vehicle is connected via satellite system. The real-time information of trams, buses and trolleybuses are available for both the operators in the control room and for all the passengers in all stops on smartphone and on city street displays. The implementation of latest generation automated fare collection and e-ticket system with NFC compatibility and reusable contactless smart cards for making electronic payments in online and offline systems in Budapest was started in 2014, the project is implemented and operated by the operator of Hong Kong Octopus card jointly with one of the leading European companies of e-ticket and automated fare collection, Scheidt & Bachmann. The deployment of 300 new digital contactless ticket vending machine will be finished by the end of 2014 in harmonization with the e-ticket system. In 2022, Futár was rebranded as BudapestGo.

Tram lines no. 4 and 6 are the busiest city tram lines in the world, with one of the world's longest trams (54-metre long Siemens Combino) running at 2–3-minute intervals at peak time and 4–5 minutes off-peak. Day services are usually from 4 am until between 11 pm and 0:30 am. Hungarian State Railways operates an extensive network of commuter rail services, their importance in the suburban commuter passenger traffic is significant, but in travel within the city is limited. The organiser of public transport in Budapest is the municipal corporation Centre for Budapest Transport (Budapesti Közlekedési Központ – BKK), that is responsible for planning and organising network and services, planning and developing tariff concepts, attending to public service procurer duties, managing public service contracts, operating controlling and monitoring systems, setting and monitoring service level agreements related to public transport, attending to customer service duties, selling and monitoring tickets and passes, attending to integrated passenger information duties, unified Budapest-centric traffic control within public transport, attending to duties related to river navigation, plus the management of Budapest roads, operating taxi stations, unified control of bicycle traffic development in the capital, preparing parking strategy and developing an operational concept, preparation of road traffic management, developing an optimal traffic management system, organising and co-ordinating road reconstruction and more, in short, everything which is related to transport in the city.

=== Roads and railways ===
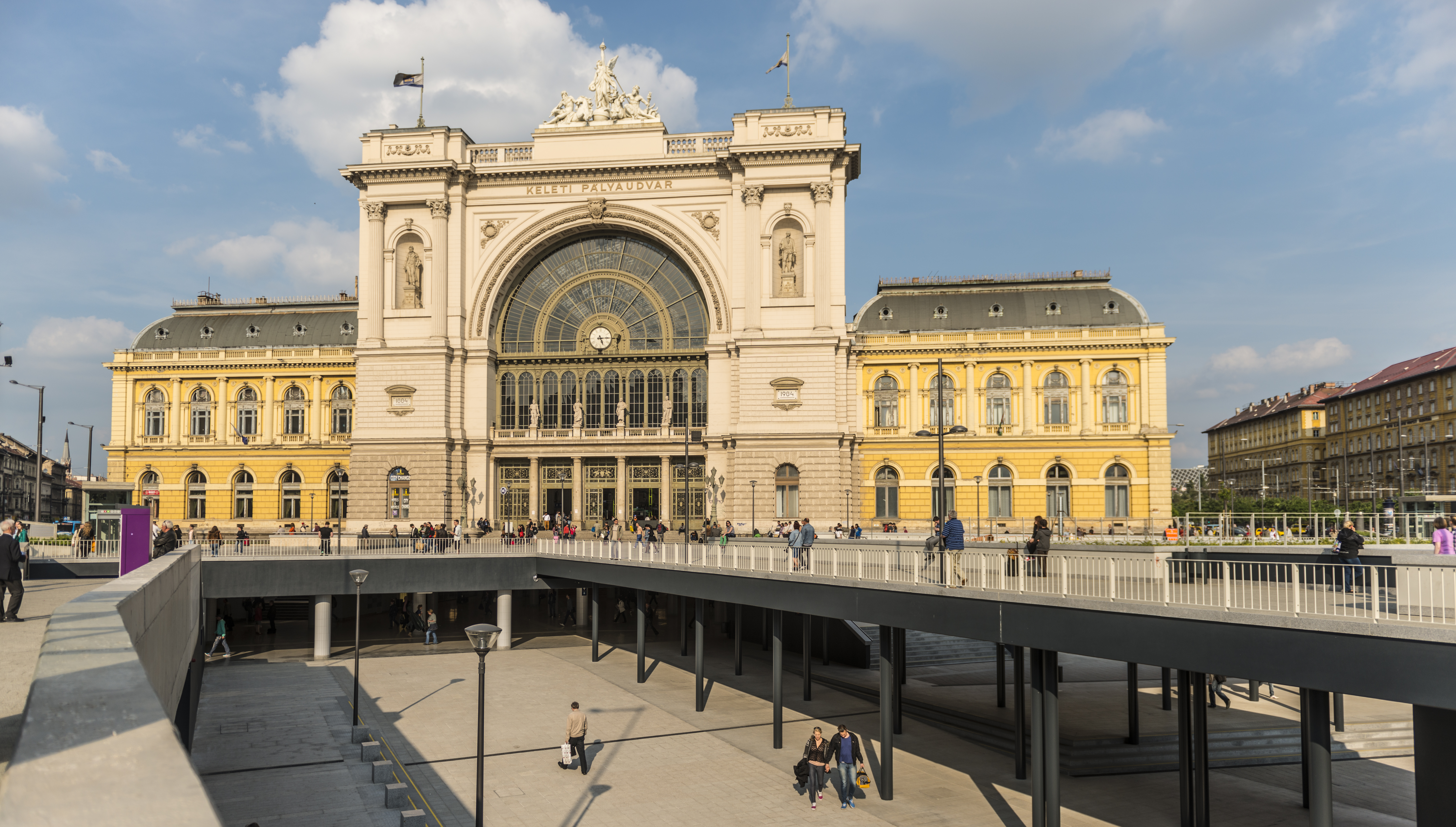
Keleti Railway Station (Budapest East Central)

Budapest is the most important Hungarian road terminus, all of the major highways and railways end within the city limits. The road system in the city is designed in a similar manner to that of Paris, with several ring roads, and avenues radiating out from the centre. Ring road M0 around Budapest is nearly completed, with only one section missing on the west side due to local disputes. The ring road is 80 kilometres (50 miles) in length, and once finished it will be 107 kilometres (66 mi) of highway in length.

The city is a vital traffic hub because all major European roads and European railway lines lead to Budapest. The Danube was and is still today an important water-way and this region in the centre of the Carpathian Basin lies at the cross-roads of trade routes. Hungarian main line railways are operated by Hungarian State Railways. There are three main railway stations in Budapest, Keleti (Eastern), Nyugati (Western) and Déli (Southern), operating both domestic and international rail services. Budapest is one of the main stops of the Orient Express on its Central and Eastern European route. There is also a suburban rail service in and around Budapest, three lines of which are operated under the name HÉV.

=== Ports, shipping and others ===
The river Danube flows through Budapest on its way from (Germany) to the Black Sea. The river is easily navigable and so Budapest historically has a major commercial port at Csepel District and at New Pest District also. The Pest side is also a famous port place with international shipping ports for cargo and for passenger ships. In the summer months, a scheduled hydrofoil service operates on the Danube connecting the city to Vienna.

BKK (through the operator BKV) also provides public transport with boat service within the borders of the city. Two routes, marked D11 and D12, connect the two banks with Margaret Island and Óbuda Island, from Rómaifürdő (Buda side, north to Óbuda Island) or Árpád Bridge (Pest side) to Rákóczi Bridge, with a total of 18 stops, while route D2 circulates in the downtown. Line D14 is a ferry service, connecting Királyerdő on the Csepel Island with Molnár Island on the Pest side, south to the city centre. In addition, several companies provides sightseeing boat trips and also an amphibious vehicle (bus and boat) operates constantly.

Water quality in Budapest harbours improved dramatically in the recent years, treatment facilities processed 100% of generated sewage in 2010. Budapesters regularly kayak, canoe, jet-ski and sail on the Danube, which has continuously become a major recreational site for the city.

Special vehicles in Budapest, besides metros, include suburban rails, trams and boats. There are a couple of less common vehicles in Budapest, like the trolleybus on several lines in Pest, the Castle Hill Funicular between the Chain Bridge and Buda Castle, the cyclecar for rent in Margaret Island, the chairlift, the Budapest Cog-wheel Railway and children's railway. The latter three vehicles run among Buda hills.

== Culture and contemporary life ==
The culture of Budapest is reflected by Budapest's size and variety. Most Hungarian cultural movements first emerged in the city. Budapest is an important centre for music, film, theatre, dance and visual art. Artists have been drawn into the city by opportunity, as the city government funds the arts with adequate financial resources.

Budapest was named "City of Design" in December 2015 and has been a member of UNESCO Creative Cities Network since then.

=== Museums and galleries ===
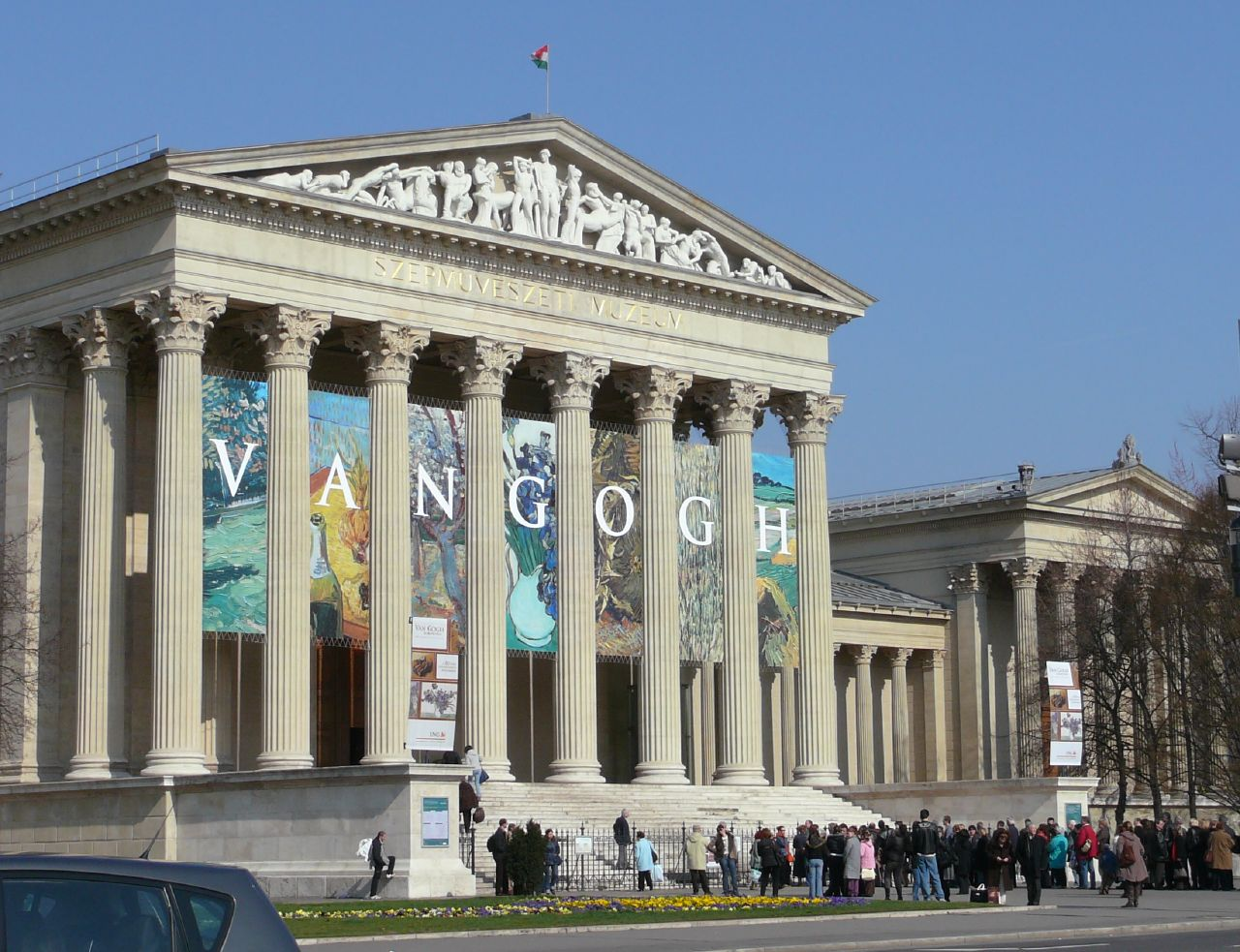
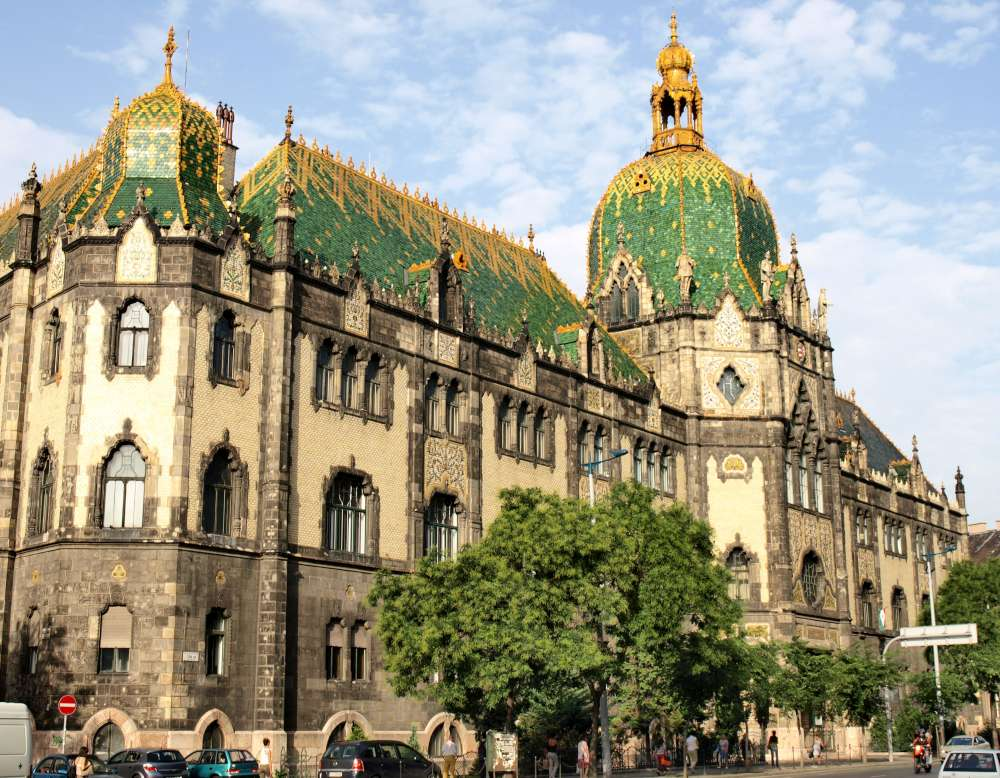
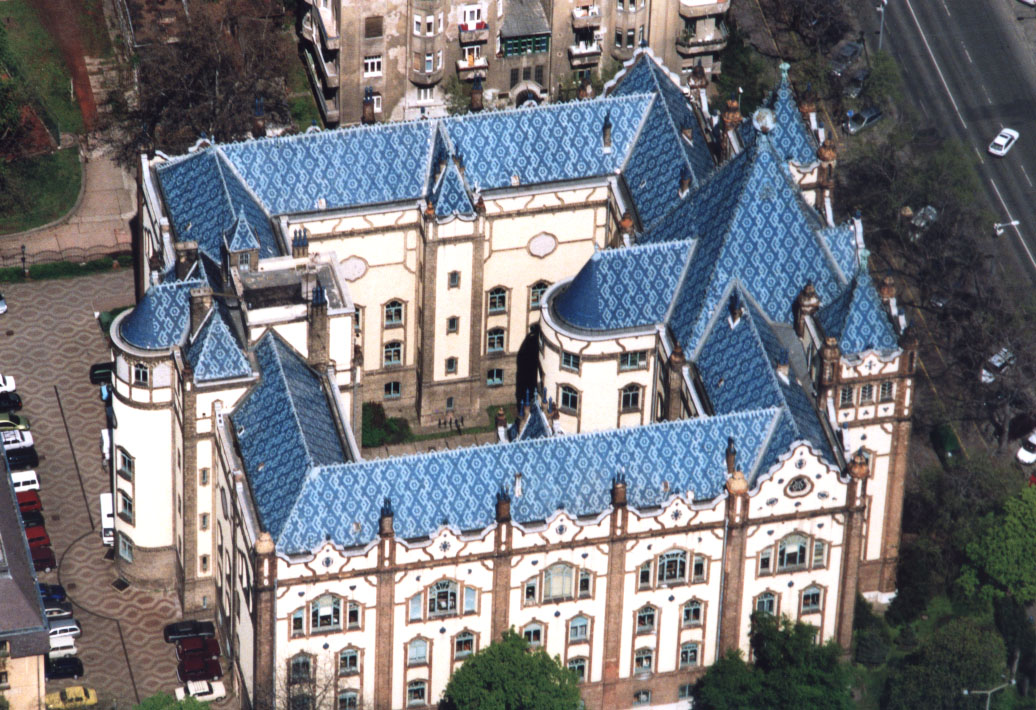
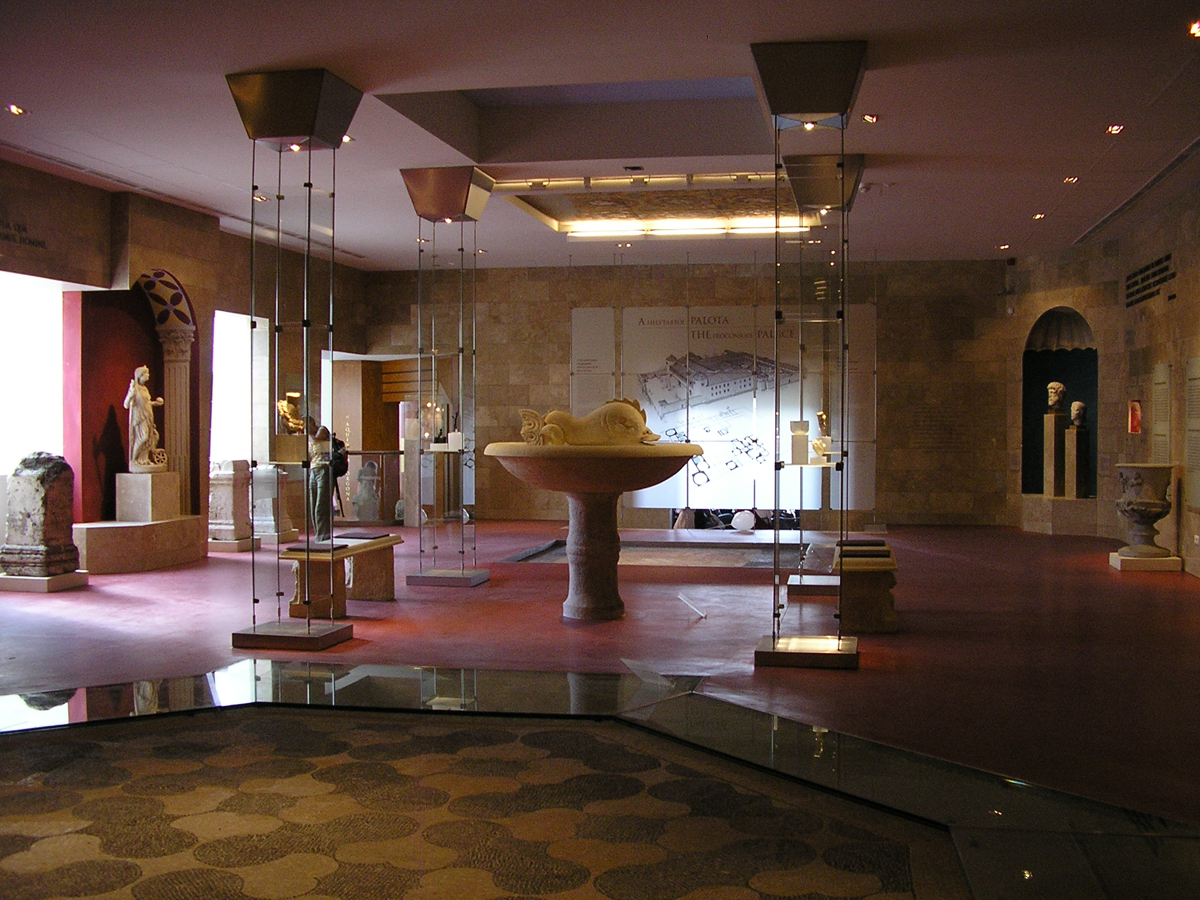
Clockwise, from upper left: Museum of Fine Arts Budapest; Museum of Applied Arts; a view of the interior of the Aquincum Museum; and Geological Museum of Budapest

Budapest is packed with museums and galleries. The city glories in 223 museums and galleries, which presents several memories, next to the Hungarian ones as well those of universal and European culture and science. Here are the greatest examples among them: the Hungarian National Museum, the Hungarian National Gallery, the Museum of Fine Arts (where can see the pictures of Hungarian painters, like Victor Vasarely, Mihály Munkácsy and a great collection about Italian art, Dutch art, Spanish art and British art from before the 19th century and French art, British art, German art, Austrian art after the 19th century), the House of Terror, the Budapest Historical Museum, the Aquincum Museum, the Semmelweis Museum of Medical History, the Memento Park, Museum of Applied Arts and the contemporary arts exhibition Palace of Arts Budapest. In Budapest there are 837 monuments, which represent most of the European artistic styles. The classical and unique Hungarian Art Nouveau buildings are prominent.

=== Libraries ===
Many libraries have unique collections in Budapest, such as the National Széchényi Library, which keeps historical relics from the age before the printing of books. The Metropolitan Szabó Ervin Library plays an important role in the general education of the capital's population. Other libraries: The Library of the Hungarian Academy of Sciences, Eötvös University Library, the Parliamentary Library, Library of the Hungarian Central Statistical Office and the National Library of Foreign Literature.

=== Opera and theatres ===
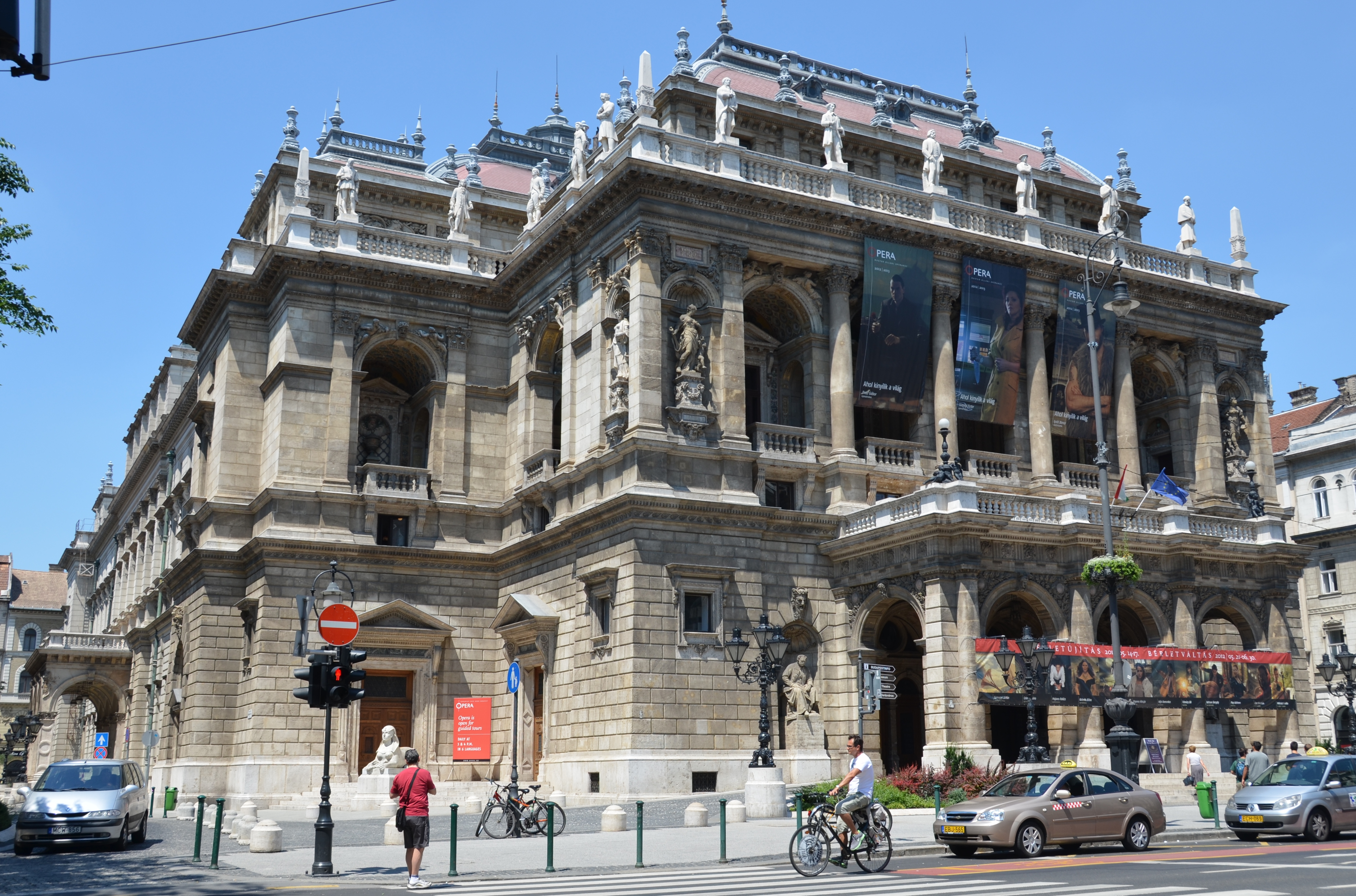
Hungarian State Opera House

In Budapest there are forty theatres, seven concert halls and an opera house. Outdoor festivals, concerts and lectures enrich the cultural offer of summer, which are often held in historical buildings. The largest theatre facilities are the Budapest Operetta and Musical Theatre, the József Attila Theatre, the Katona József Theatre, the Madách Theatre, the Hungarian State Opera House, the National Theatre, the Vigadó Concert Hall, Radnóti Miklós Theatre, the Comedy Theatre and the Palace of Arts, known as MUPA. The Budapest Opera Ball is an annual Hungarian society event taking place in the building of the Budapest Opera (Operaház) on the last Saturday of the carnival season, usually late February.

=== Casinos ===
There are 11 casinos in Hungary (11 is the maximum number of casinos allowed by law), and five of them are located in the capital. All five of these casinos were owned by LVC Diamond Játékkaszinó Üzemeltető Kft, the gambling company of late András Vajna (better known as Andy Vajna) until his death in 2017. The biggest casino in Budapest and in all of Hungary is the Las Vegas Casino at the Corvin promenade.

=== Performing arts and festivals ===
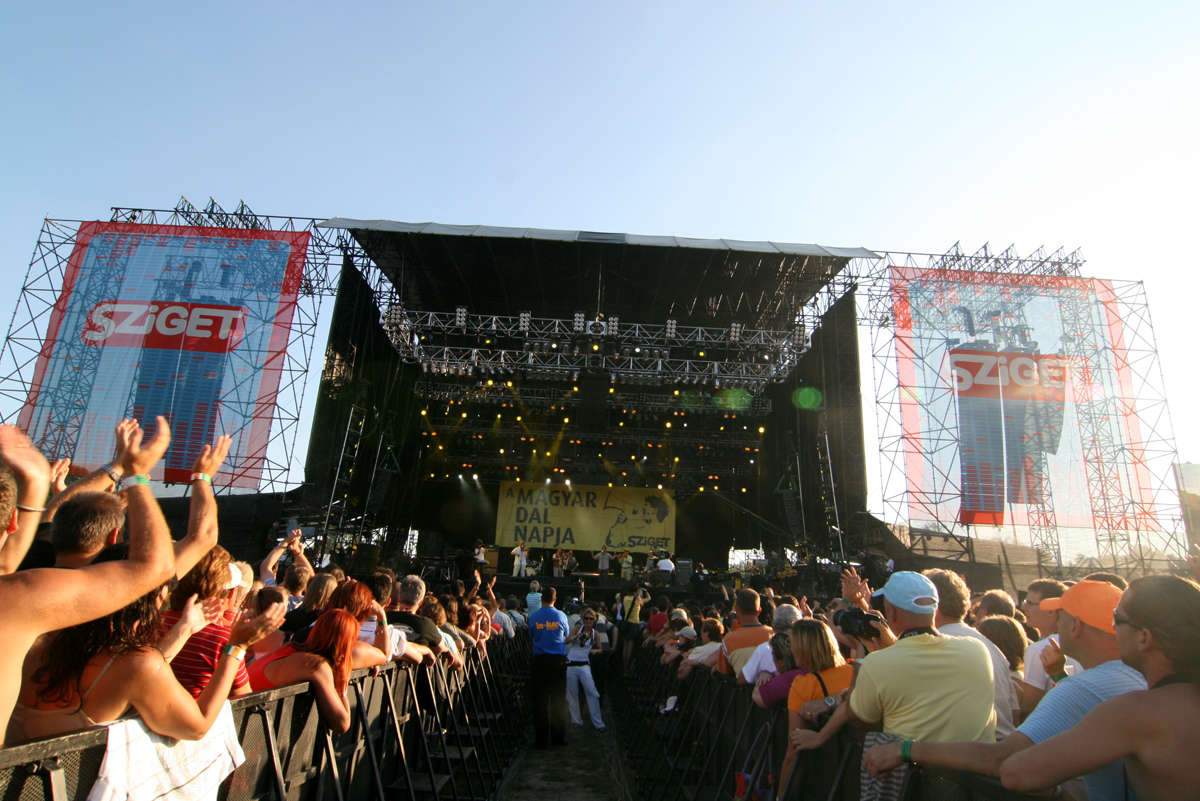
Sziget Festival Budapest. One of the largest music festivals in Europe provides a multicultural, diverse meeting point for locals and foreigners every year.

Several annual festivals take place in Budapest. The Sziget Festival is one of the largest outdoor music festivals in Europe. The Budapest Spring Festival includes concerts at several venues across the city. The Café Budapest Contemporary Arts Festival (formerly the Budapest Autumn Festival) brings free music, dance, art, and other cultural events to the streets of the city. The Budapest Wine Festival and Budapest Pálinka Festival, occurring each May, are gastronomy festivals focusing on culinary pleasures. The Budapest Pride (or Budapest Pride Film and Cultural Festival) occurs annually across the city, and usually involves a parade on the Andrássy Avenue. Other festivals include the Budapest Fringe Festival, which brings more than 500 artists in about 50 shows to produce a wide range of works in alternative theatre, dance, music and comedy outside the mainstream. The LOW Festival is a contemporary cultural festival held in Hungary in the cities Budapest and Pécs from February until March; the name of the festival alludes to the Low Countries, the region encompassing the Netherlands and Flanders. The Budapest Jewish Summer Festival, in late August, is one of the largest in Europe.

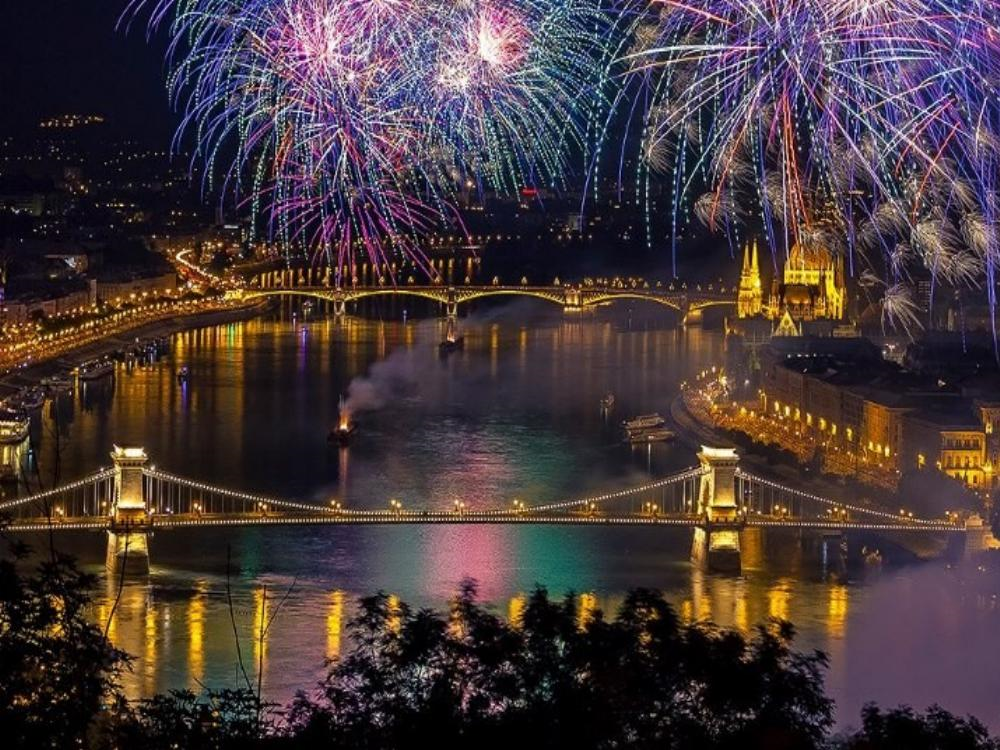
Festive fireworks of the foundation of the Hungarian state on 20 August

There are many symphony orchestras in Budapest, with the Budapest Philharmonic Orchestra being the preeminent one. It was founded in 1853 by Ferenc Erkel and still presents regular concerts in the Hungarian State Opera House and National Theatre. Budapest also has one of the more active jazz scenes in Central Europe.

The dance tradition of the Carpathian Basin is a unique area of the European dance culture, which is also a special transition between the Balkans and Western Europe regions. The city is home to several authentic Hungarian folk dance ensembles which range from small ensembles to professional troupes. Budapest is one of the few cities in the world with a high school for learning folk dance.

=== Fashion ===
Budapest is home to a fashion week twice a year, where the city's fashion designers and houses present their collections and provide a meeting place for the fashion industry representatives. Budapest Fashion Week additionally a place for designers from other countries may present their collections in Budapest. Hungarian models, like Barbara Palvin, Enikő Mihalik, Diána Mészáros, Viktória Vámosi usually appear at these events along international participants. Fashion brands like Zara, H&M, Mango, ESPRIT, Douglas AG, Lacoste, Tommy Hilfiger, Guess, Nike and other retail fashion brands are common across the city's shopping malls and on the streets.

Major luxury fashion brands such as Louis Vuitton, Moncler, Furla, Gucci, Versace, Zegna, Max Mara, Michael Kors, Karl Lagerfeld and Hugo Boss, or luxury watch brands such as Rolex, Hublot, Omega, Breitling, and TAG Heuer, can be found among the city's most prestigious shopping streets, the Fashion Street, Váci Street and Andrássy Avenue in Budapest's main upscale fashion district, the Leopoldtown.

=== Media ===
Budapest is a prominent location for the Hungarian entertainment industry, with many films, television series, books, and other media set there. Budapest is the largest centre for film and television production in Hungary. In 2011, it employed more than 50,000 people and generated 63.9% of revenues of the media industry in the country. Budapest is the media centre of Hungary, and the location of the main headquarters of Hungarian Television and other local and national TV and radio stations, such as M1, M2, Duna TV, Duna World, RTL Klub, TV2 (Hungary), Euronews, Comedy Central, MTV Hungary, VIVA Hungary, Viasat 3, Cool TV, and Pro4, and politics and news channels such as Hír TV, ATV, and Echo TV. Documentary channels include Discovery Channel, Discovery Science, Discovery World, National Geographic Channel, Nat Geo Wild, Spektrum TV, and BBC Entertainment. This is less than a quarter of the channels broadcast from Budapest; for the whole picture see Television in Hungary.

In 2012, in Hungary there were 7.2 million internet users (72% of the population) and 2.3 million subscriptions for mobile broadband.

=== Cuisine ===
In the modern age, Budapest developed its own peculiar cuisine, based on products of the nearby region, such as lamb, pork and vegetables special to the region. Modern Hungarian cuisine is a synthesis of ancient Asiatic components mixed with French, Germanic, Italian, and Slavic elements. The food of Hungary can be considered a melting pot of the continent, with a culinary base formed from its own, original Magyar cuisine. Considerable numbers of Saxons, Armenians, Italians, Jews and Serbs settled in the Hungarian basin and in Transylvania, also contributing with different new dishes. Elements of ancient Turkish cuisine were adopted during the Ottoman era, in the form of sweets (for example different nougats, like white nougat called törökméz), quince (birsalma), Turkish delight, Turkish coffee or rice dishes like pilaf, meat and vegetable dishes like the eggplant, used in eggplant salads and appetizers, stuffed peppers and stuffed cabbage called töltött káposzta. Hungarian cuisine was influenced by Austrian cuisine under the Austro-Hungarian Empire, dishes and methods of food preparation have often been borrowed from Austrian cuisine, and vice versa.

Budapest restaurants reflect diversity, with menus carrying traditional regional cuisine, fusions of various culinary influences, or innovating in the leading edge of new techniques. Budapest's food shops also have a solid reputation for supplying quality specialised culinary products and supplies, reputations that are often built up over generations. These include many shop and served in several Michelin-starred restaurants.

=== In fiction ===
The 1906 novel The Paul Street Boys, the 1937 novel Journey by Moonlight, the 1957 book The Bridge at Andau, the 1975 novel Fateless, the 1977 novel The End of a Family Story, the 1986 book Between the Woods and the Water, the 1992 novel Under the Frog, the 1987 novel The Door, the 2002 novel Prague, the 2003 book Budapeste, the 2004 novel Ballad of the Whisky Robber, the 2005 novels Parallel Stories and The Historian, the 2012 novel Budapest Noir are set, amongst others, partly or entirely in Budapest. Some of the better known feature films set in Budapest are Kontroll, The District!, Gloomy Sunday, Sunshine, An American Rhapsody, As You Desire Me, The Good Fairy, Hanna's War, The Journey, Ladies in Love, Music Box, The Shop Around the Corner, Zoo in Budapest, Underworld, Mission: Impossible – Ghost Protocol and Spy. The Grand Budapest Hotel (2014) is a Wes Anderson film. It was filmed in Germany, and set in the fictional Republic of Zubrowka, which is in the alpine mountains of Hungary.

== Sports ==
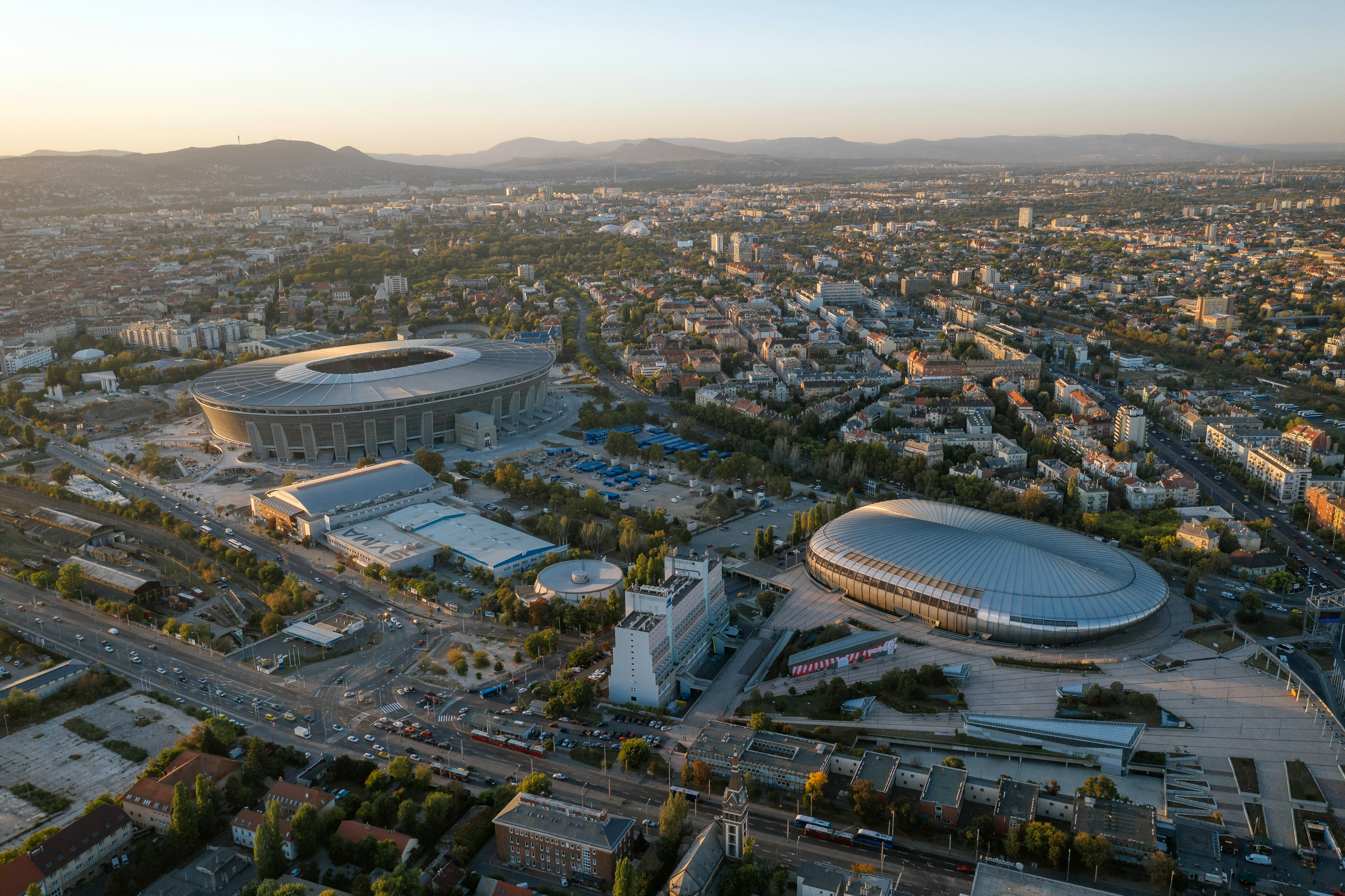
Puskás Aréna National Stadium and László Papp Arena

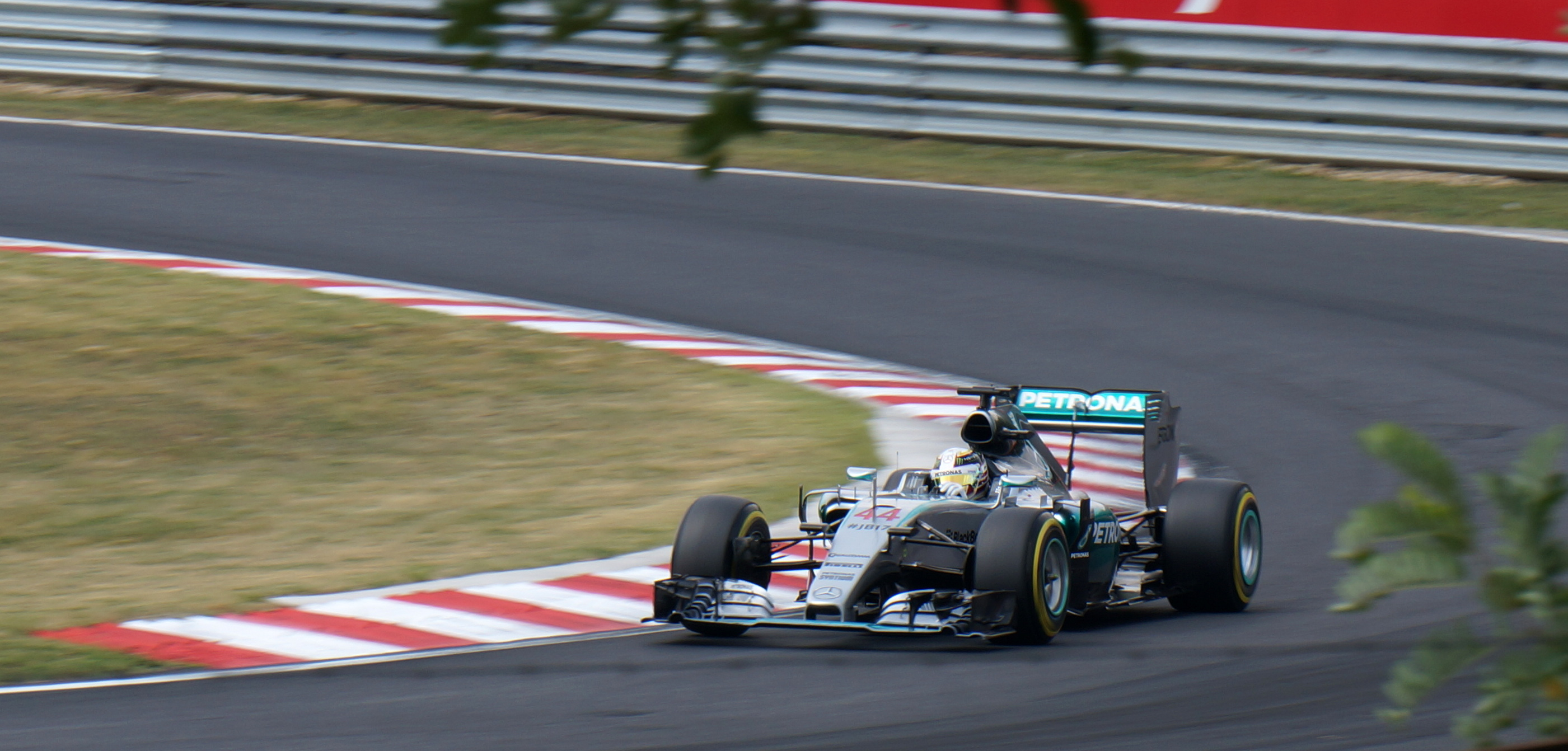
Hungarian Grand Prix on the Hungaroring

Budapest hosted many global sporting events in the past, among others the 1994 IAAF World Cross Country Championships, 1997 World Amateur Boxing Championships, 2000 World Fencing Championships, 2001 World Allround Speed Skating Championships, Bandy World Championship 2004, 2008 World Interuniversity Games, 2008 World Modern Pentathlon Championships, 2010 ITU World Championship Series, 2011 IIHF World Championship, 2012 European Speed Skating Championships, 2013 World Fencing Championships, 2013 World Wrestling Championships, 2014 World Masters Athletics Championships, 2017 World Aquatics Championships, and 2017 World Judo Championships, only in the last two-decade. Besides these, Budapest was the home of many European-level tournaments, like 2006 European Aquatics Championships, 2010 European Aquatics Championships, 2010 UEFA Futsal Championship, 2013 European Judo Championships, 2013 European Karate Championships and was the host of 2023 World Championships in Athletics and 4 matches in the UEFA Euro 2020, which was held in the 67,215-seat new multi-purpose Puskás Ferenc Stadium, to mention a few.

In 2015, the Assembly of the Hungarian Olympic Committee and the Assembly of Budapest decided to bid for the 2024 Summer Olympics. Budapest has lost several bids to host the games, in 1916, 1920, 1936, 1944, and 1960 to Berlin, Antwerp, London, and Rome, respectively. The Hungarian Parliament also voted to support the bid on 28 January 2016, later Budapest City Council approved list of venues and Budapest became an official candidate for the 2024 Summer Olympic Games. However, they withdrew their bid later on.

Numerous Olympic, World, and European Championship winners and medalists reside in the city, which follows from Hungary's 8th place among all the nations of the world in the All-time Olympic Games medal table.

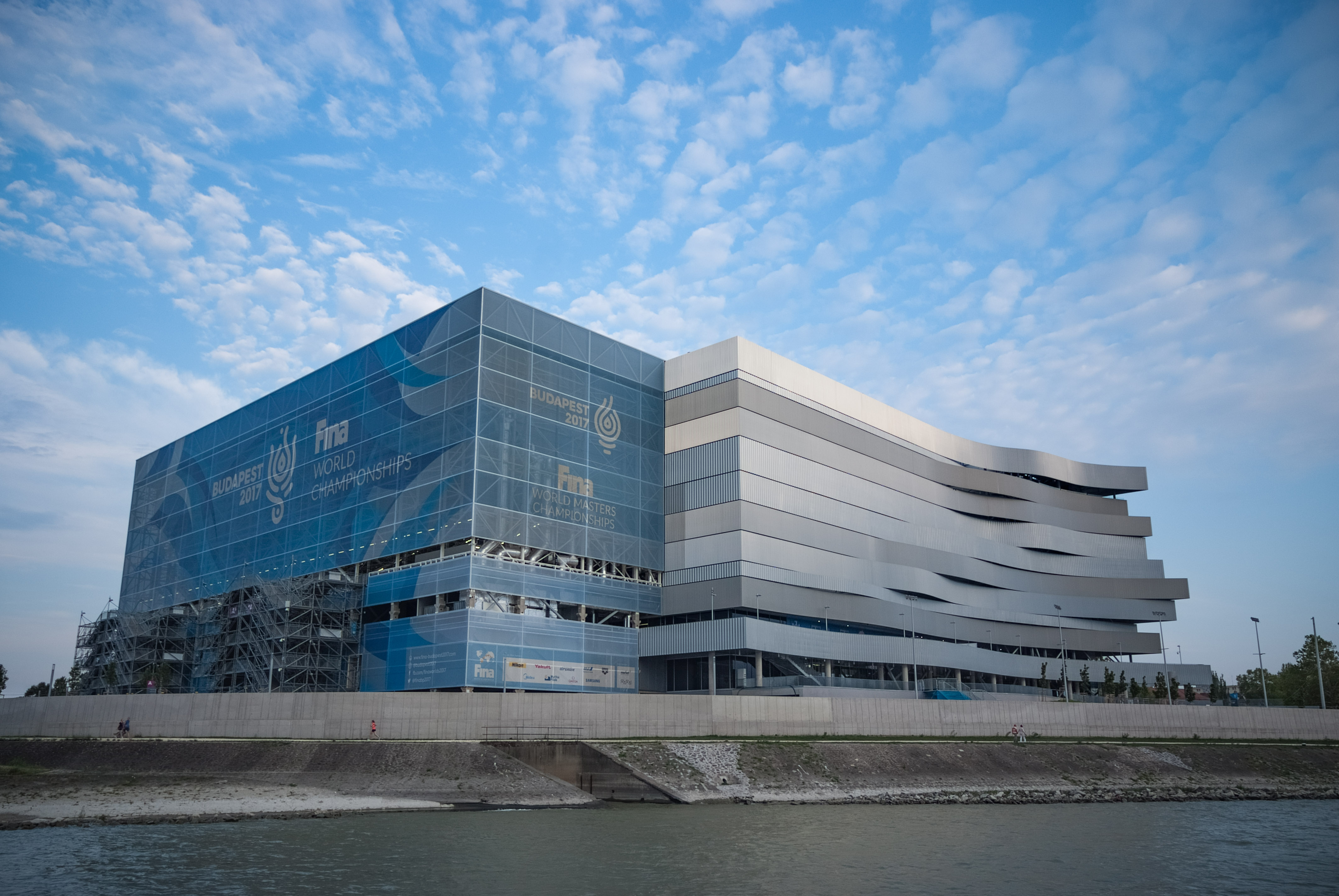
The Danube Arena

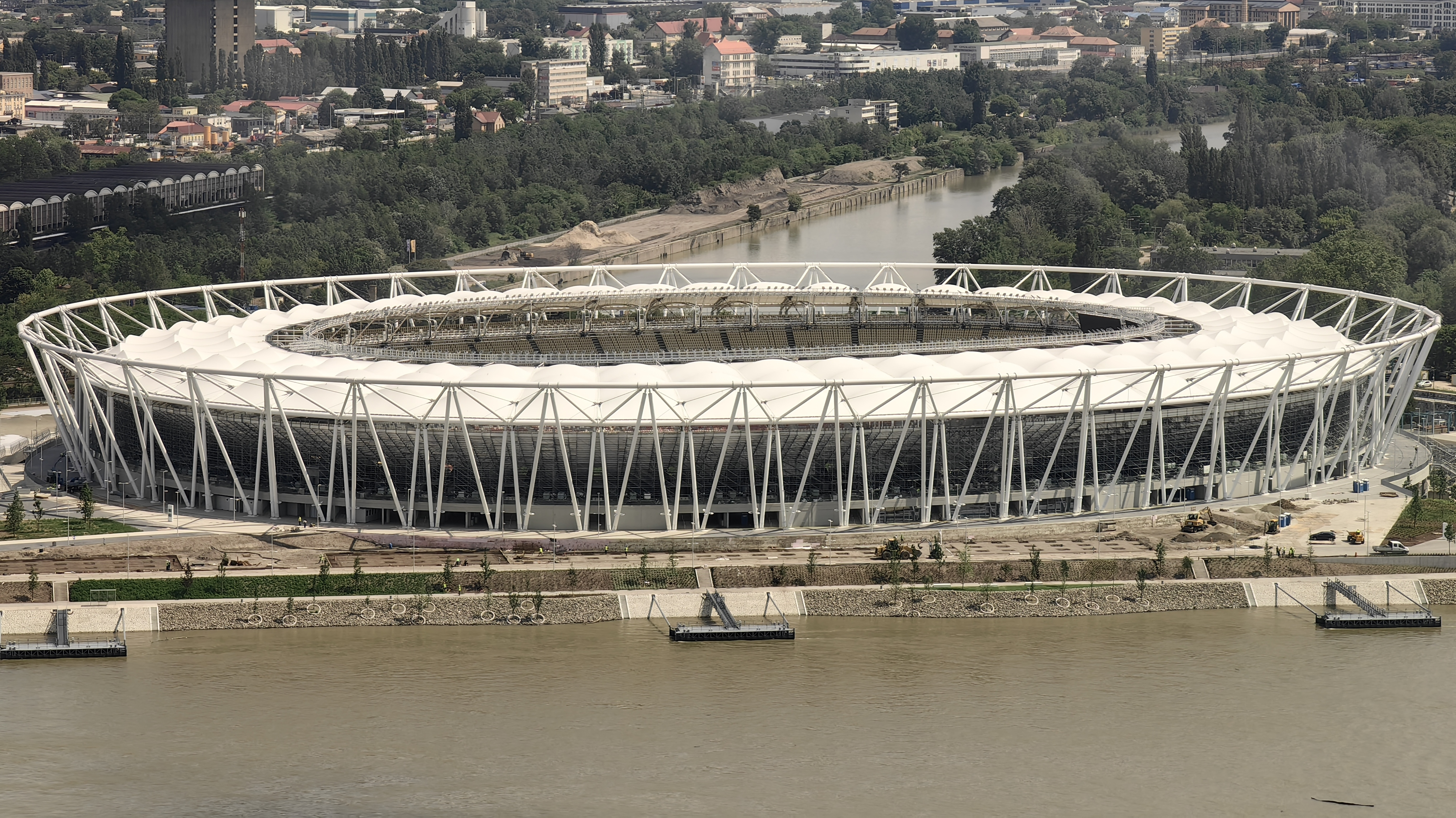
The National Athletics Centre

Hungarians have always been avid sports people: during the history of the Summer Olympic Games, Hungarians have brought home 476 medals, of which 167 are gold. The top events in which Hungarians have excelled are fencing, swimming, water polo, canoeing, wrestling and track & field sports. Beside classic sports, recreational modern sports such as bowling, pool billiard, darts, go-carting, wakeboarding and squash are very popular in Budapest, and extreme sports are also gaining ground. Furthermore, the Budapest Marathon and Budapest Half Marathon also attract many people every year. The city's largest football stadium is named after Ferenc Puskás, recognised as the top scorer of the 20th century and for whom FIFA Puskás Award was named.

One of Budapest's most popular sport is football and it has many Hungarian League football club, including in the top level Nemzeti Bajnokság I league, like Ferencvárosi TC (32 Hungarian League titles), MTK Budapest FC (23 titles), Újpest FC (20 titles), Budapest Honvéd FC (14 titles), Vasas SC (6 titles), Csepel SC (4 titles), Budapesti TC (2 titles).

The Hungarian Grand Prix in Formula One has been held at the Hungaroring just outside the city, a circuit which has FIA Grade 1 license. Since 1986, the race has been a round of the FIA Formula One World Championship. At the 2013 Hungarian Grand Prix, it was confirmed that Hungary will continue to host a Formula 1 race until 2021. The track was completely resurfaced for the first time in early 2016, and it was announced the Grand Prix's deal was extended for a further five years, until 2026.

Budapest is home to two four-star UEFA stadiums: Puskás Aréna, Groupama Aréna, and two three-star UEFA stadiums: Hidegkuti Nándor Stadion and Bozsik Aréna (currently under renovations to upgrade to UEFA's four-star category).

Budapest will be the home of the headquarters of the World Aquatics after moving from Lausanne by the 2027 World Aquatics Championships.

== Education ==
Budapest is home to over 35 higher education institutions, many of which are universities. Under the Bologna Process, many offered qualifications are recognised in countries across Europe. Medicine, dentistry, pharmaceuticals, veterinary programs, and engineering are among the most popular fields for foreigners to undertake in Budapest. Most universities in Budapest offer courses in English, as well as in other languages like German, French, and Dutch, aimed specifically at foreigners. Many students from other European countries spend one or two semesters in Budapest through the Erasmus Programme.

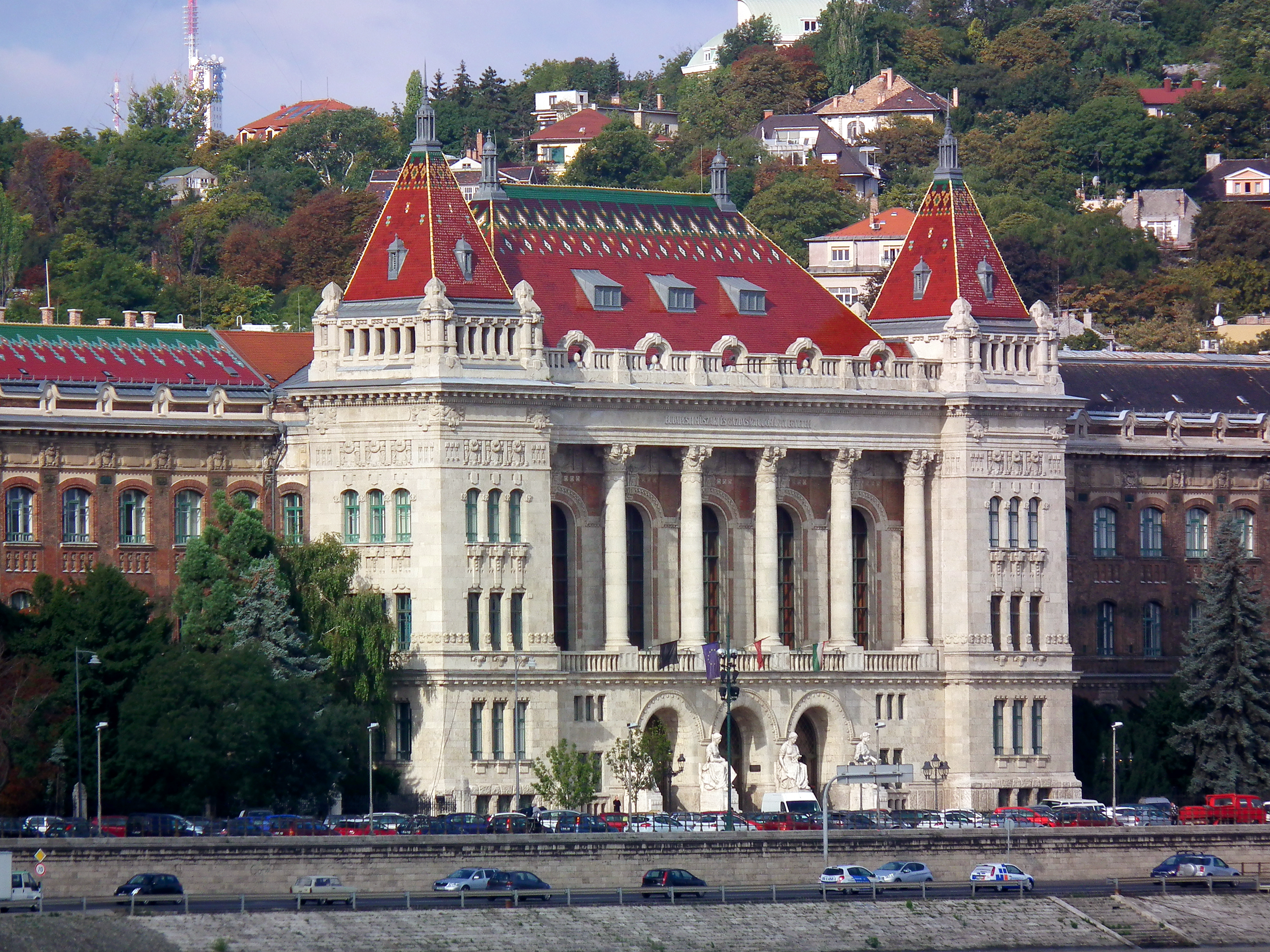
Main Building of the Budapest University of Technology and Economics, the oldest institute of technology in the world, founded in 1782

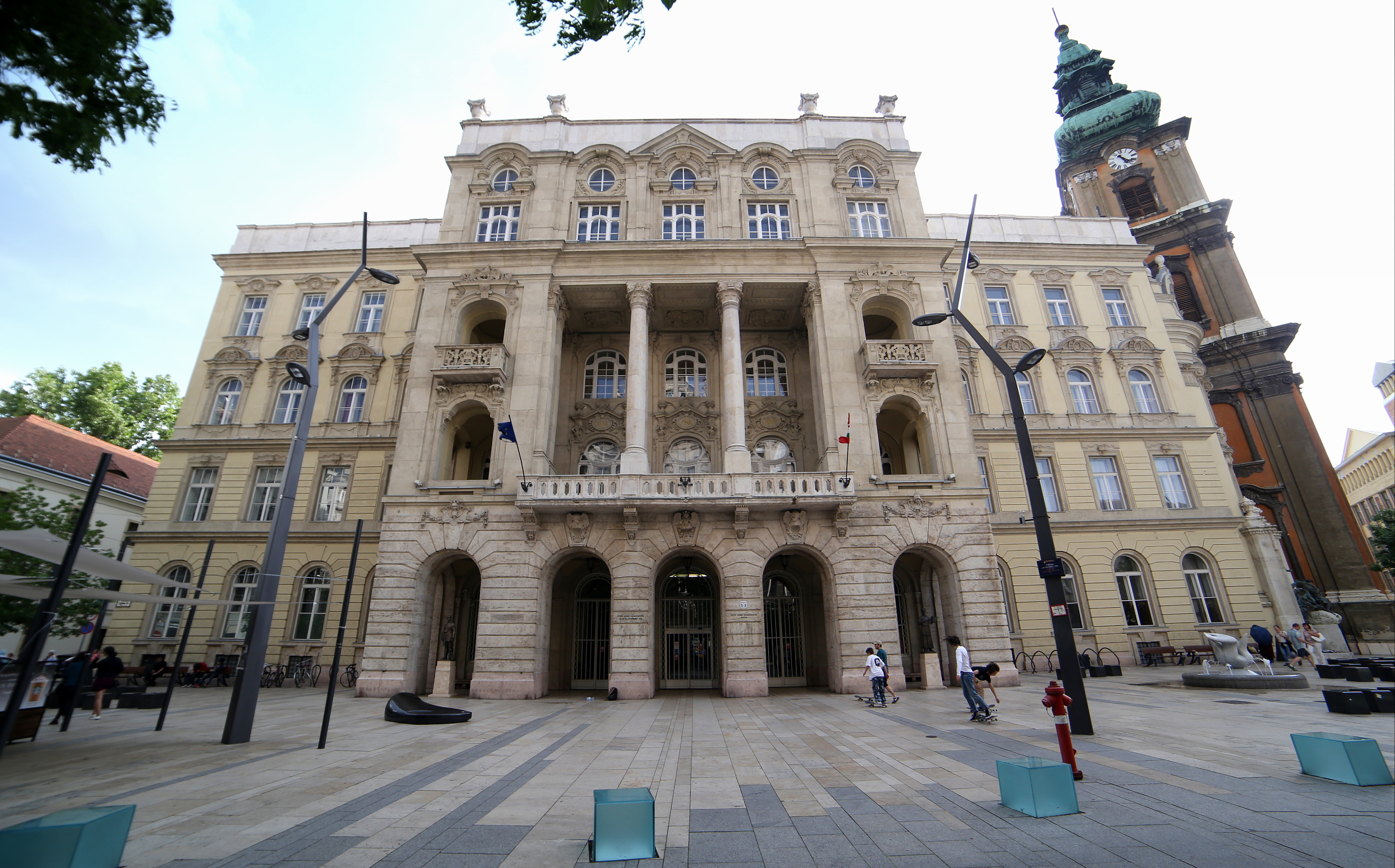
Eötvös Loránd University is one of the largest and most prestigious institutions.

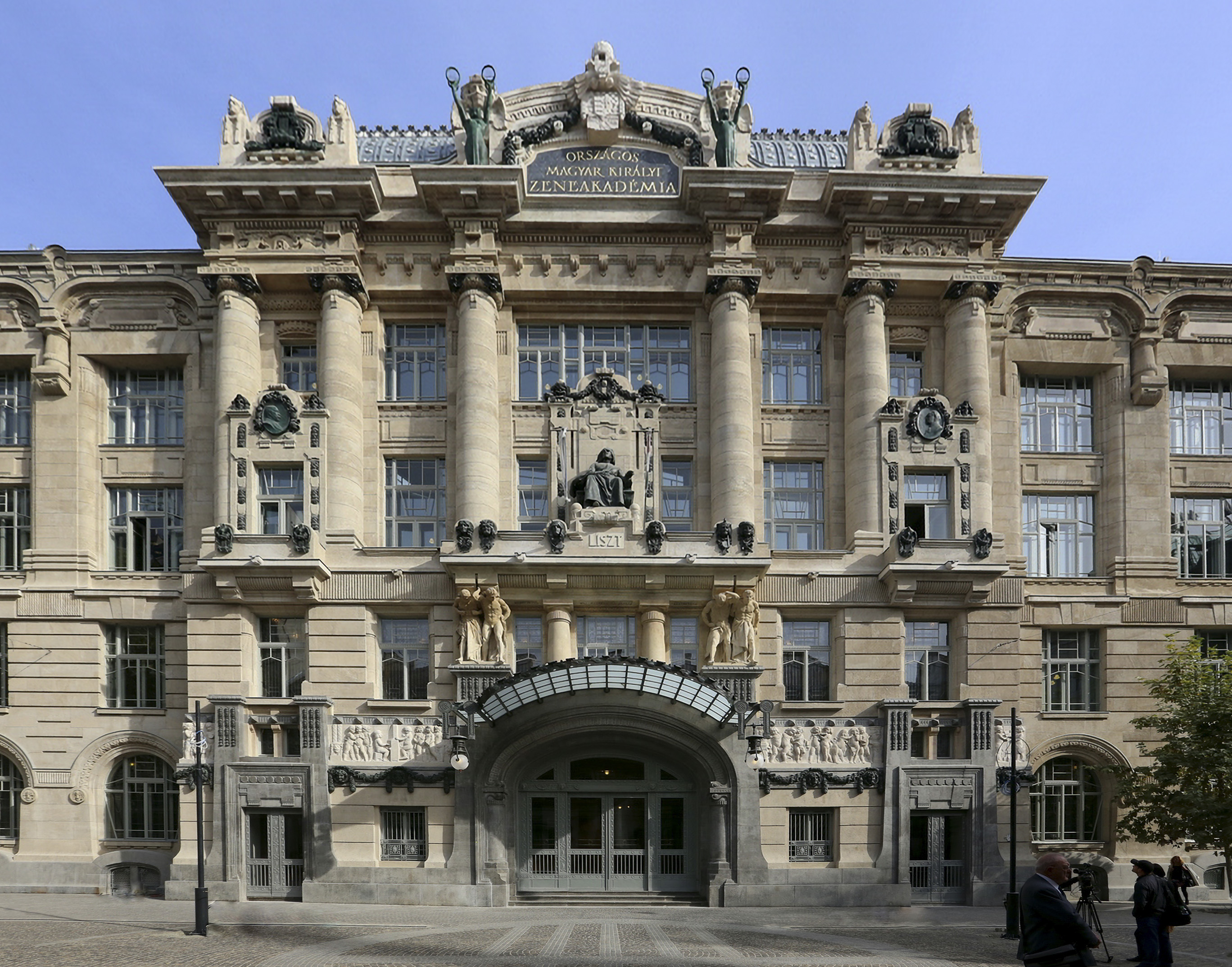
Main Building of the Liszt Ferenc Academy of Music, founded in 1875

Universities in Budapest
Name	Established	City	Type	Students	Academic staff
Budapest Business School	1857	Budapest	Public Business school	16,905	987
Szent István University	1787	Budapest	Public Classic university	12,583	1,313
Budapest University of Technology and Economics	1782	Budapest	Public Institute of technology	21,171	961
Corvinus University	1920	Budapest	Public Business school	14,522	867
Eötvös Loránd University	1635	Budapest	Public Classic university	26,006	1,800
Hungarian University of Fine Arts	1871	Budapest	Public Art school	652	232
Liszt Ferenc Academy of Music	1875	Budapest	Public Music school	831	168
Moholy-Nagy University of Art and Design	1870	Budapest	Public Art school	894	122
National University of Public Service	2012	Budapest	Public Classic university	10,800	465
Óbuda University	1879	Budapest	Public Institute of technology	12,888	421
Semmelweis University	1769	Budapest	Public Medical school	10,880	1,230
University of Physical Education	1925	Budapest	Public Classic university	2,500	220
Academy of Drama and Film in Budapest	1865	Budapest	Public Art school	455	111
Andrássy University Budapest	2002	Budapest	Private Classic university	210	51
Aquincum Institute of Technology	2011	Budapest	Private Institute of technology	50	41
Budapest Metropolitan University	2001	Budapest	Private Classic university	8,000	350
Budapest University of Jewish Studies	1877	Budapest	Private Theological university	200	60
Central European University	1991	Budapest	Private Classic university	1,380	399
International Business School	1991	Budapest	Private Business school	800	155
Károli Gáspár University of Reformed Church	1855	Budapest	Private Classic university	8,401	342
Pázmány Péter Catholic University	1635	Budapest	Private Classic university	9,469	736
Evangelical-Lutheran Theological University	1557	Budapest	Private Theological university	220	36

== International relations ==
Budapest has quite a few sister cities and many partner cities around the world. Like Budapest, many of them are the most influential and largest cities of their country and region, most of them are the primate city and political, economical, cultural capital of their country. The Mayor of Budapest says the aim of improving sister city relationships is to allow and encourage a mutual exchange of information and experiences, as well as co-operation, in the areas of city management, education, culture, tourism, media and communication, trade and business development.

=== Historic sister cities ===
- New York (United States) 1992
- Fort Worth (United States) 1990
- Shanghai (China) 2013
- Beijing (China) 2005
- Tehran (Iran) 2015
- Berlin (Germany) 1992
- Frankfurt am Main (Germany) 1990
- Vienna (Austria) 1990
- Lisbon (Portugal) 1992
- Tel Aviv (Israel) 1989
- Zagreb (Croatia) 1994
- Sarajevo (Bosnia and Herzegovina) 1995
- Florence (Italy) 2008

=== Partnerships around the world ===
- Prague (Czech Republic) 2010
- Rotterdam (Netherlands) 1991
- Warsaw (Poland) 2005
- Kraków (Poland) 2005
- Bangkok (Thailand) 2007
- Osaka (Japan) 1998
- Jakarta (Indonesia) 2009
- Daejeon (South Korea) 1994
- Naples (Italy) 1993
- Istanbul (Turkey) 1985
- İzmir (Turkey) 1985
- Gaziantep (Turkey) 2010
- Ankara (Turkey) 2015
- Sofia (Bulgaria) 2009
- Vilnius (Lithuania) 2000
- Košice (Slovakia) 1997
- Lviv (Ukraine) 1993

Some of the city's districts are also twinned to small cities or districts of other big cities; for details see the article List of districts in Budapest.

== See also ==
- Bridges of Budapest
- Budapest metropolitan area
- Fort Budapest
- List of cemeteries in Budapest
- List of films shot in Budapest
- List of cities and towns on the river Danube
- List of historical capitals of Hungary
- Music of Budapest
- Outline of Hungary
- Spas in Budapest
- Urban and Suburban Transit Association (most of its activity is centred on Budapest)

== Sources ==
- Budapest: Eyewitness Travel Guildes. DK Travel. 2007. ISBN 978-0-7566-2435-4.
- Barber, Annabel (2004). Visible Cities Budapest: A City Guide. Somerset. ISBN 978-963-212-986-0.
- Fallon, Steve; Kaminski, Anna (2017). Budapest & Hungary Travel Guide. Lonely Planet. ISBN 9781786575425.
- Molnar, Miklos (2001). A Concise History of Hungary. Cambridge Concise Histories. Cambridge University Press. ISBN 978-0-521-66736-4.
- Sebestyen, Victor (2022). Budapest: Between East and West (Hardcover). London: Weidenfeld & Nicolson. ISBN 9781474609999.
- Ungvary, Krisztian (2006). The Siege of Budapest: One Hundred Days in World War II. Yale University Press. ISBN 978-0-300-11985-5.
