= Capital Circus of Budapest =

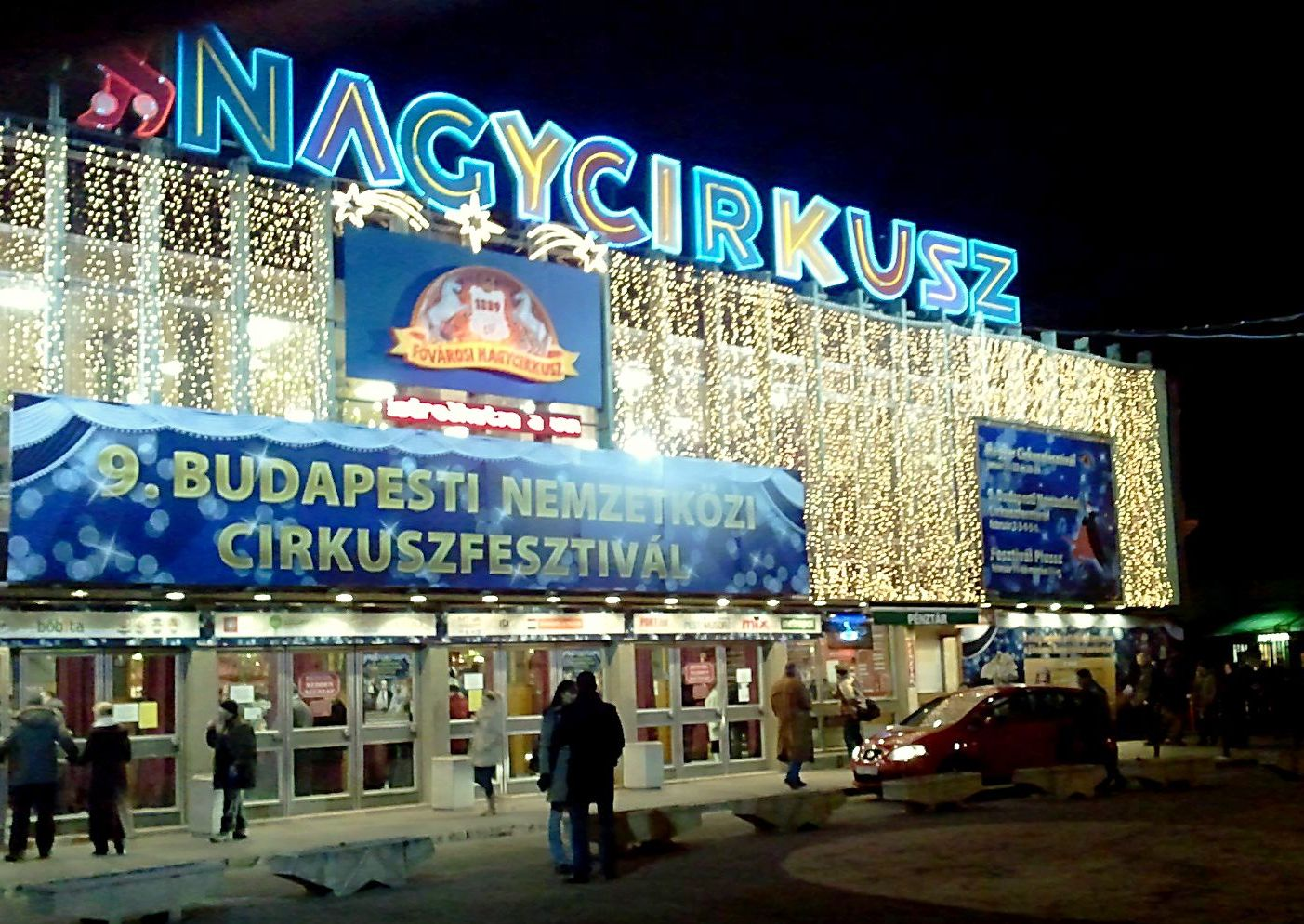
- Interactive map of the Capital Circus of Budapest area

General information
- Type: Circus
- Location: Budapest, Állatkerti körút 12a, 1146 Hungary
- Coordinates: 47°31′09.48″N 19°04′51.96″E
- Opening: 1889

The Capital Circus of Budapest (Hungarian: Fővárosi Nagycirkusz) is a circus building located in Budapest, Hungary. It originally opened in 1889, although it has changed locations since then. Its current building opened in 1971 and is the only stone circus in Central Europe. The building seats 1850 people, and features animals, clowns, and artistic performing acts. The building is in Városliget city park, near which are the Budapest Zoo, the former Budapest Amusement park, Vajdahunyad Castle, and the Széchenyi thermal bath.

Since it is a stone circus, its operation is independent from weather, and therefore it is opened both in summer and winter. Recently Capital Circus also holds other events besides circus productions, like fashion shows, sport events, classical and pop concerts, folk dance performances as well as theatre and opera plays.

== History ==
The original building of the Circus was opened on 27 June 1889 in Városliget by the German-Dutch circus director Ede Wulff. This building had the same parameters as the current Capital Circus, but it had 2290 seats. in 1895, Wulff Ede gave the lease rights of the Capital Circus to the management of the Zoo.

The Ősbudavára club was opened in 1896 also in the area of the Zoo. It employed many world-class artist, and therefore it was a competition of the Capital Circus. On 30 April 1904, the Capital Circus was reopened with a spectacular show by Matvey Beketov, the newest renter of the circus, which he renovated at his own cost. From this time until 1934, it was renamed as Beketow Circus.

In 1935, the capital city of Budapest held another competition for the rent of the circus, which was won by the entrepreneur György Fényes. He organized the premiere of the new show at July 1936, which astonished the audience just as much as the splendour of the renovated building. Many prominent and world-class artist was part of the team of Fényes Capital Circus, like the clown Gábor Eötvös, who was approved by Charlie Chaplin himself.

1943 was the last year of the Fényes Capital Circus, since the circus was closed in 1944 because of the intensifying bombing. The Circus was reopened in July 1945, and deprivatised in the 1950s. The Circus was reopened on 14 January 1971 with a festival gala performance. The circus director was Mrs. Gábor Eötvös, the first and so far only female director of the Capital Circus.

As of 1996, International Circus Festival of Budapest is held here every two years.

=== Directors ===
- Ede Wulff (1889–1895)
- Matvey Beketov (1904–1919)
- Sándor Könyöt (1904–1923)
- Matvey Beketov (1923–1928)
- Sándor Beketov, Rezső Árvai (1929–1935)
- György Fényes (1936–1943)
- Miklós Göndör, Ferenc Göndör, Rezső Árvai, Nándor Barton, Lajos Fekete (1945–1966)
- Mrs. Gábor Eötvös (1971–1986)
- Tamás Radnóti (1986–1988)
- István Kristóf (1 April 1988 – 10 February 2012)
- József Richter (1 November 2012 – 30 November 2015)
- Péter Fekete (1 December 2015 –)
