= Mill Industry Museum =

Museum in Budapest, Hungary

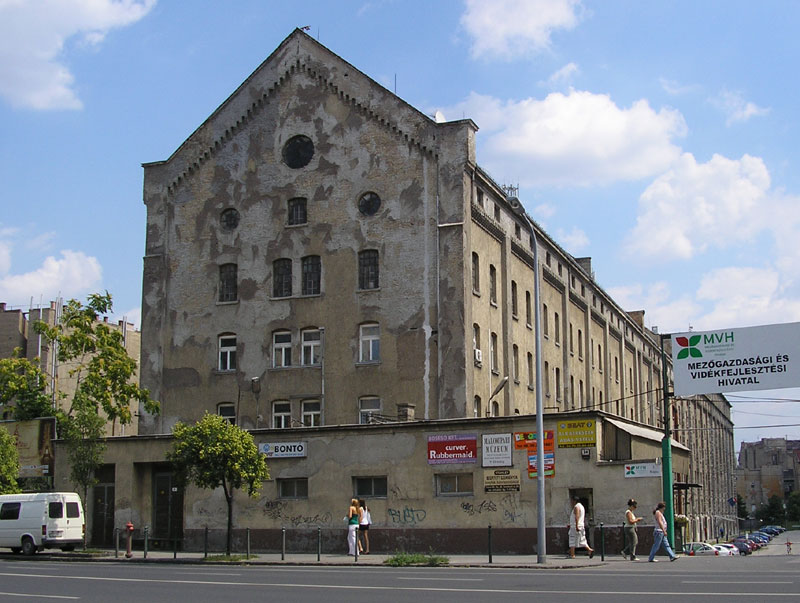
- Building of Mill Industry Museum
- Established: 1978
- Dissolved: 2012
- Coordinates: 47.4769°N 19.0704°E

The Mill Industry Museum (in Hungarian Malomipari Múzeum) is one of Budapest's major industrial and technical history museums in Ferencváros (at 24 Soroksári út). Maintained by Concordia Közraktár Kereskedelmi Zrt.

The collection was made up of the equipment and tangible memories of mills that had been liquidated in the past. In 1978, it opened as a permanent but private industrial history exhibition, and in 1984 it was officially declared a specialist museum and opened to the public under the name Milling Museum. It was temporarily closed in 2012. Its reopening is probably not expected since then. The objects are currently owned by the Museum of Hungarian Agriculture (Vajdahunyad Castle).

== Closing the museum ==
In 2012, the head of the museum was retired, the museum was temporarily closed for the time being, and then its collection material was packed and partially transported. His fate was still uncertain at that time. By 2019, the museum will probably be permanently closed. It is still listed on the website of the Hungarian Museums as "temporarily closed".

Since 2013, the management of the museum's material has been transferred to the Museum of Hungarian Agriculture.

== Sources ==
- A magyar élelmiszeripar története (szerk. Kirsch János...) Mezőgazdasági Kiadó, Budapest, 1986. ISBN 963-232-213-4
- A Malomipari Múzeum a Magyar Múzeumok honlapon
- A múzeum a Concordia Zrt. honlapján
- Magyar Múzeumok
- (főszerk.) Balassa M. Iván: Magyarország múzeumai. Múzeumlátogatók kézikönyve, Vince Kiadó Kft., Budapest, 2001, ISBN 963-9192-93-7
- Dr. Koncz Erzsébet – Dr. Szabolcs Ottó: Barangolás Budapesten. Kézikönyv a főváros múzeumait látogatók számára, Korona Kiadó, Budapest, 1995
- Klement Judit: Gőzmalmok a Duna partján. A budapesti malomipar a 19-20. században. Budapest, 2010, ISBN 978-963-346-946-0
- (szerk.) Füzes Endre: Budapest – Malomipari Múzeum, TKM, Budapest, 1988, ISBN 963 555 537 7 (Tájak-Korok-Múzeumok Kiskönyvtára 305.)
- Malomtúra Ambrussal, 9.kerulet.ittlakunk.hu oldala, 2012. június 3.
- Huszadik Század történelmi hírportálja, 1939. júliusi hír Kivándorol a Concordia-Malom, a Condordia gőzmalom leállásáról
- Gönczi Ambrus: A Concordia. Egy világhírű malom jubileumára. Honismeret, 44. évf. 4. szám, 2016. 3–5. oldal
- Egykor.hu oldala néhány adat és kép a Concordia malomról
- Műemlékem.hu leírása a védett Concordia malomépületről, és a 2015 novemberében készült állapotjelentés.
- B. Kovács Gergely: Leégett épület a Soroksári úton – Jórészt a malmainkat is Széchenyinek köszönhettük. Magyar Nemzet, 2018. március 7.
- Viczián Zsófia: Gizella, Concordia, Hungária. Soroksári úti malomépületekről, a Malomipari Múzeum közeli bezárásáról. Válasz.hu 2012. június 21.
- https://www.industrialheritagehungary.com/02-Industrial-Heritages/01-Food/concordia-mill.html
- http://chemonet.hu/hun/food/muzeum/malomip/index.html
