= City Park (Budapest) =

Public park in Budapest, Hungary

Coordinates: 47°30′50″N 19°05′05″E

The City Park (Hungarian: Városliget, pronounced [ˈvaːroʃliɡɛt]; German: Stadtwäldchen) is a public park close to the centre of Budapest, Hungary. It contains many attractions, including buildings from the 19th century, such as Széchenyi thermal bath, the Budapest Zoo and Botanical Garden, and the Capital Circus of Budapest as well as museums and other cultural institutes, including the Museum of Ethnography and the Hungarian House of Music.

== History ==
The area was formerly called Ökör-dűlő, meaning "Oxmeadow". The first mention of the name comes from 1241 in the archaic form, Ukurföld. In the 18th century, the area was called Ochsenried in German.

Around 1800 the official name was changed to Batthyány-erdő (Batthyány Forest) after its tenants, the Batthyány family. The first trees and planned walkways were established in 1751 and after the public park was created in the first decades of the 19th century the present-day name, Városliget (and its German version, Stadtwäldchen, lit.: "little city forest") was accepted and it became one of the first public parks in the world.

The City Park was the main venue of the 1896 millennium celebrations of Hungary, by which time Andrássy Avenue, Millennium Underground and the Grand Boulevard had been built.

The park hosted motorsport events in the 1950s.

The Liget Budapest project, an urban-cultural development project, was begun in 2019 by Viktor Orbán's government to develop the park into a cultural precinct. It includes a new playground and sports centre, as well as a number of new and renewed cultural buildings. The New National Gallery, the most significant element of the project, is due to be completed by 2028.

== Description and location ==
City Park in Budapest, known locally as Városliget, is a 0.9-by-0.6-mile (1,400 by 970 m) rectangle, with an area of 302 acres (1.2 km^{2}), located in District XIV of Budapest, between Hungária körút, Ajtósi Dürer sor, Vágány utca and Dózsa György út.

Its main entrance is at Heroes' Square (Hősök tere), one of Hungary's World Heritage sites.

== Gallery ==
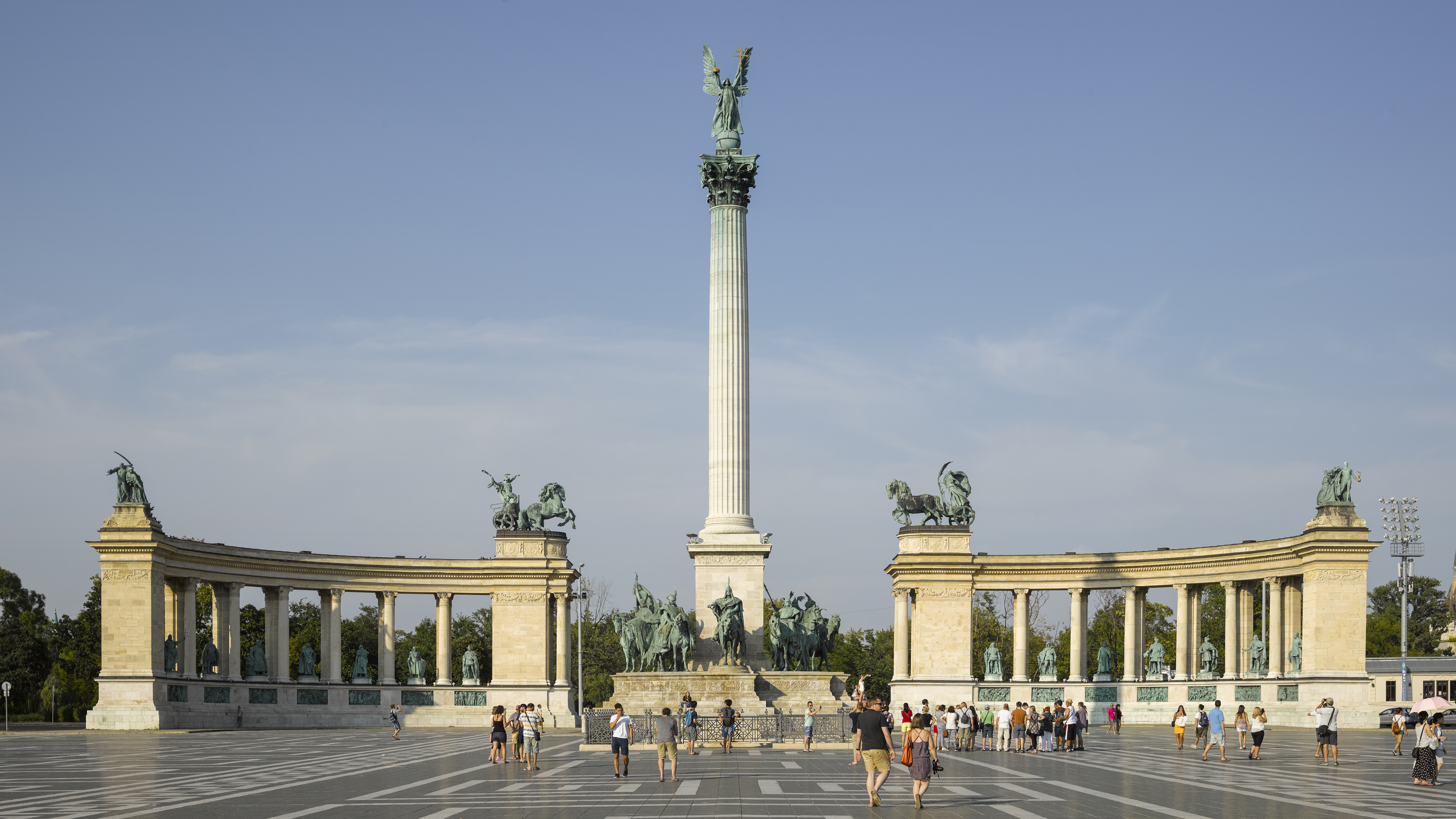
Heroes' Square

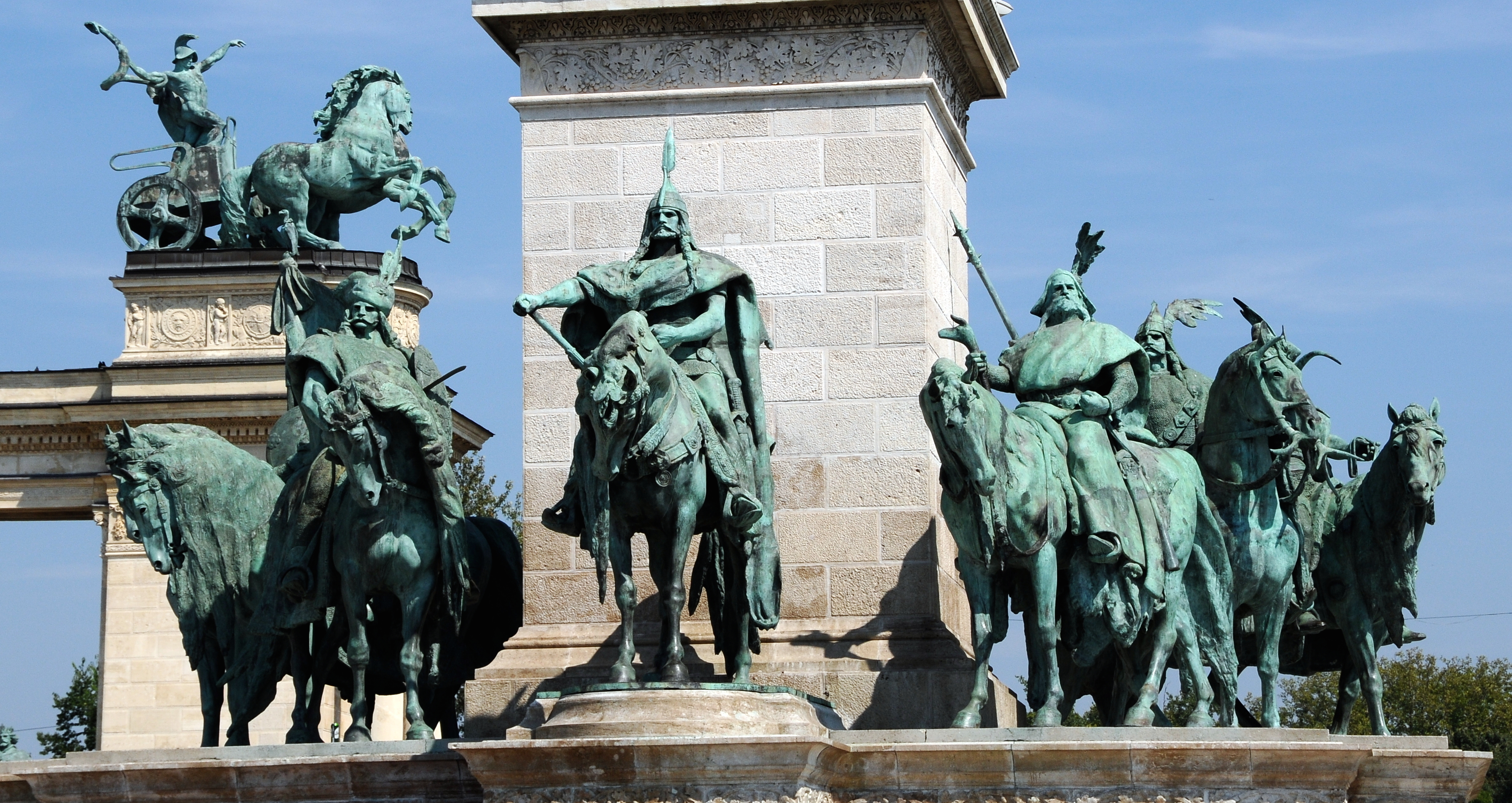
Statues of the Seven Chieftains on the Heroes' Square

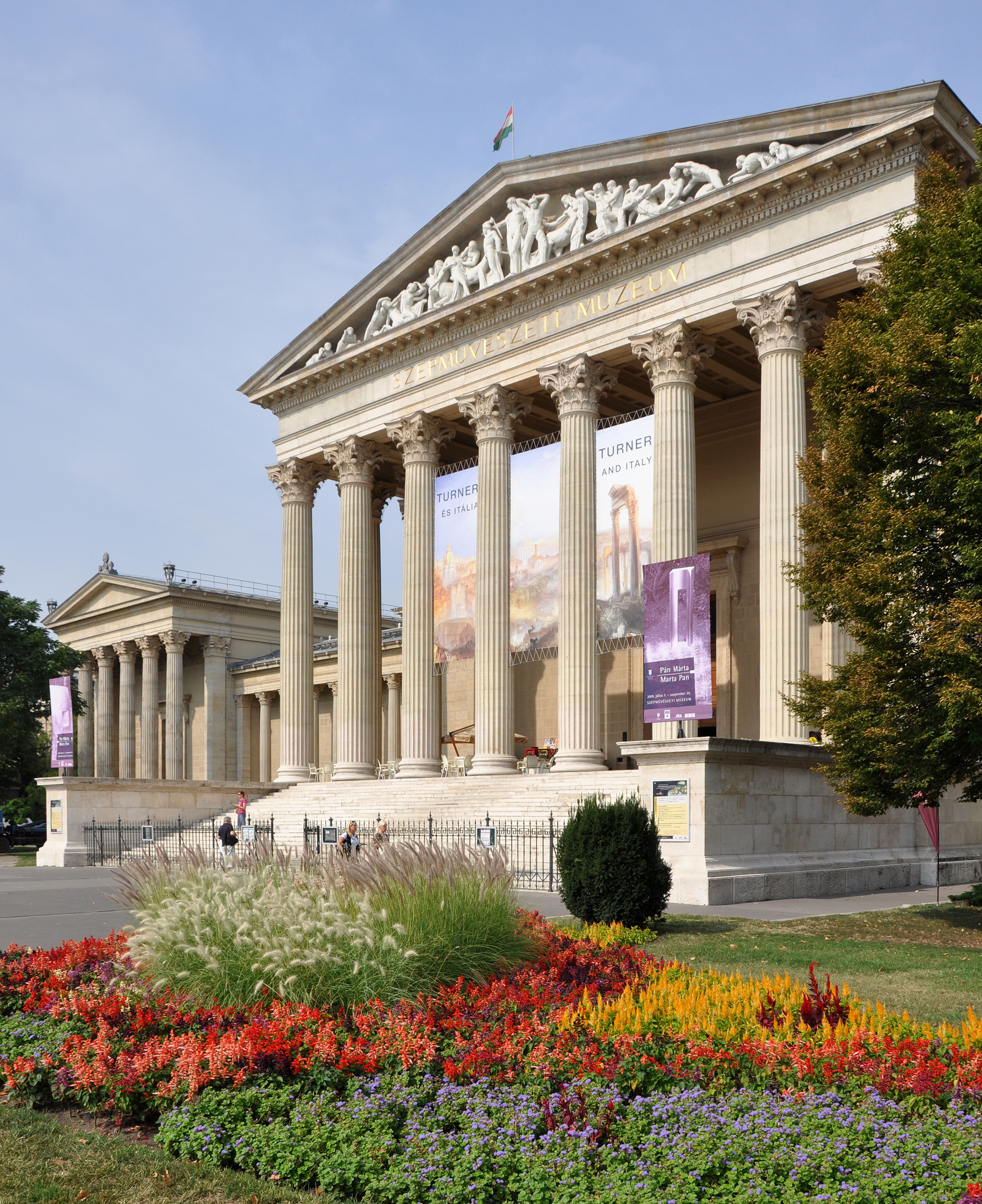
Museum of Fine Arts

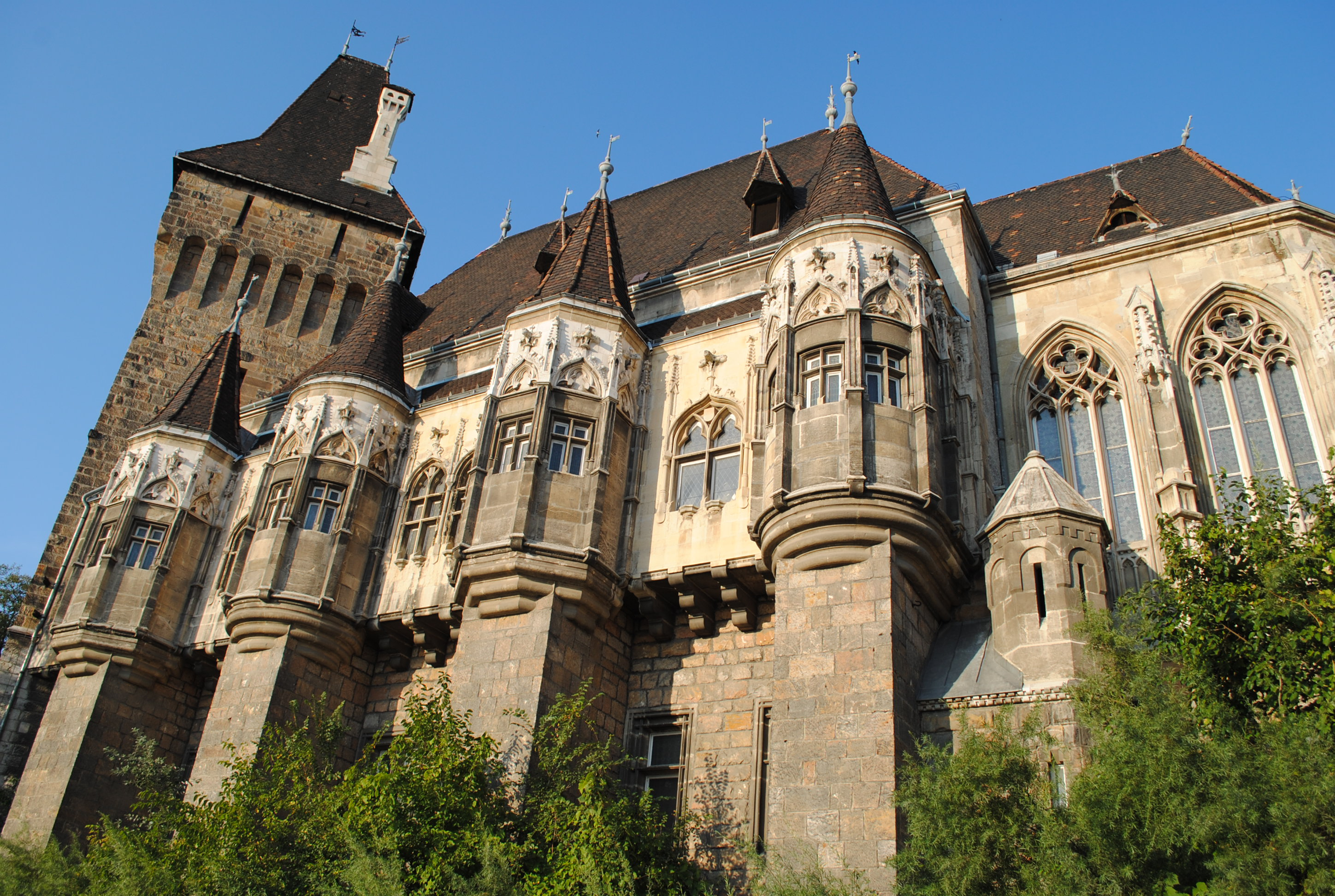
Vajdahunyad Castle

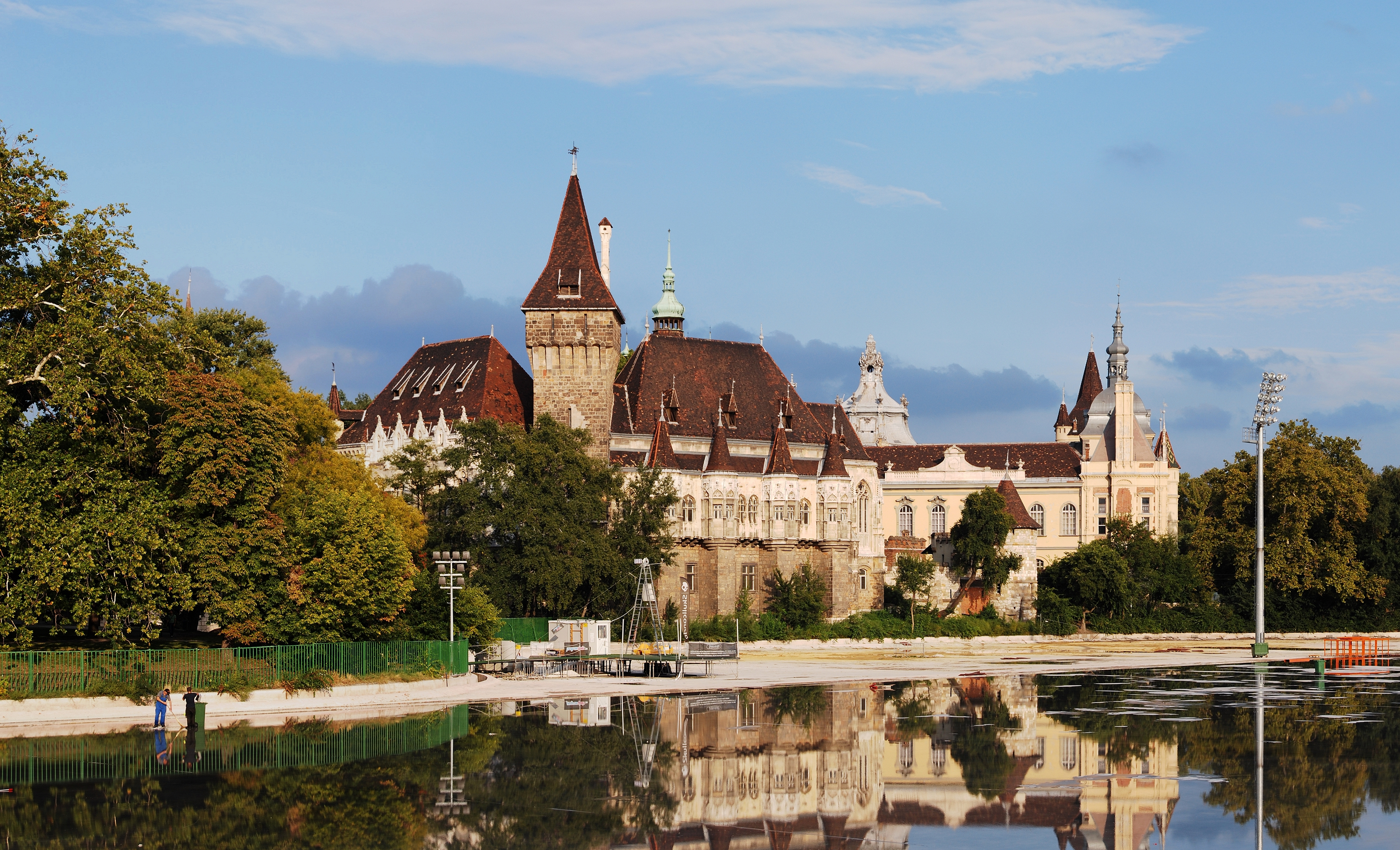
Vajdahunyad Castle

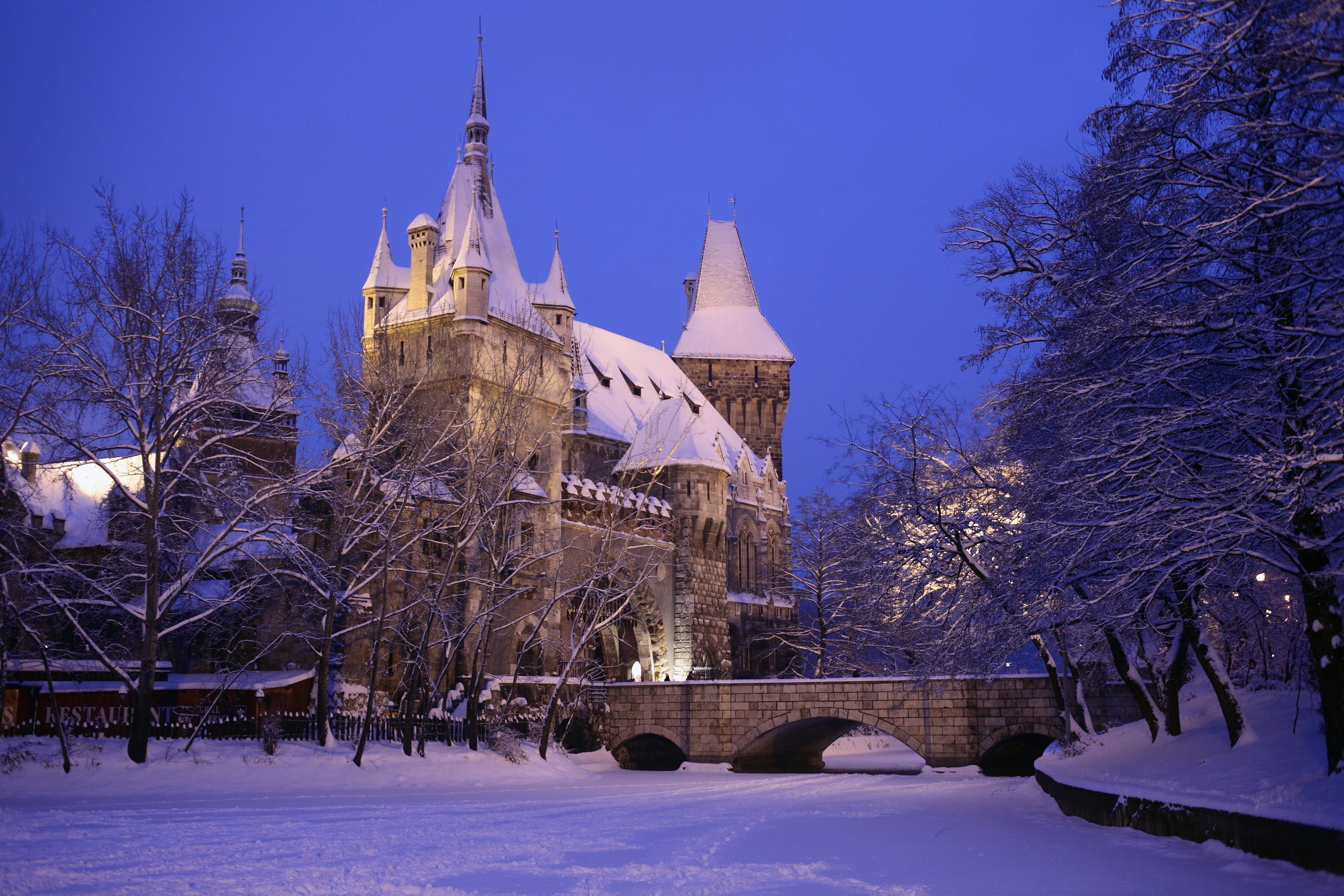
Vajdahunyad Castle

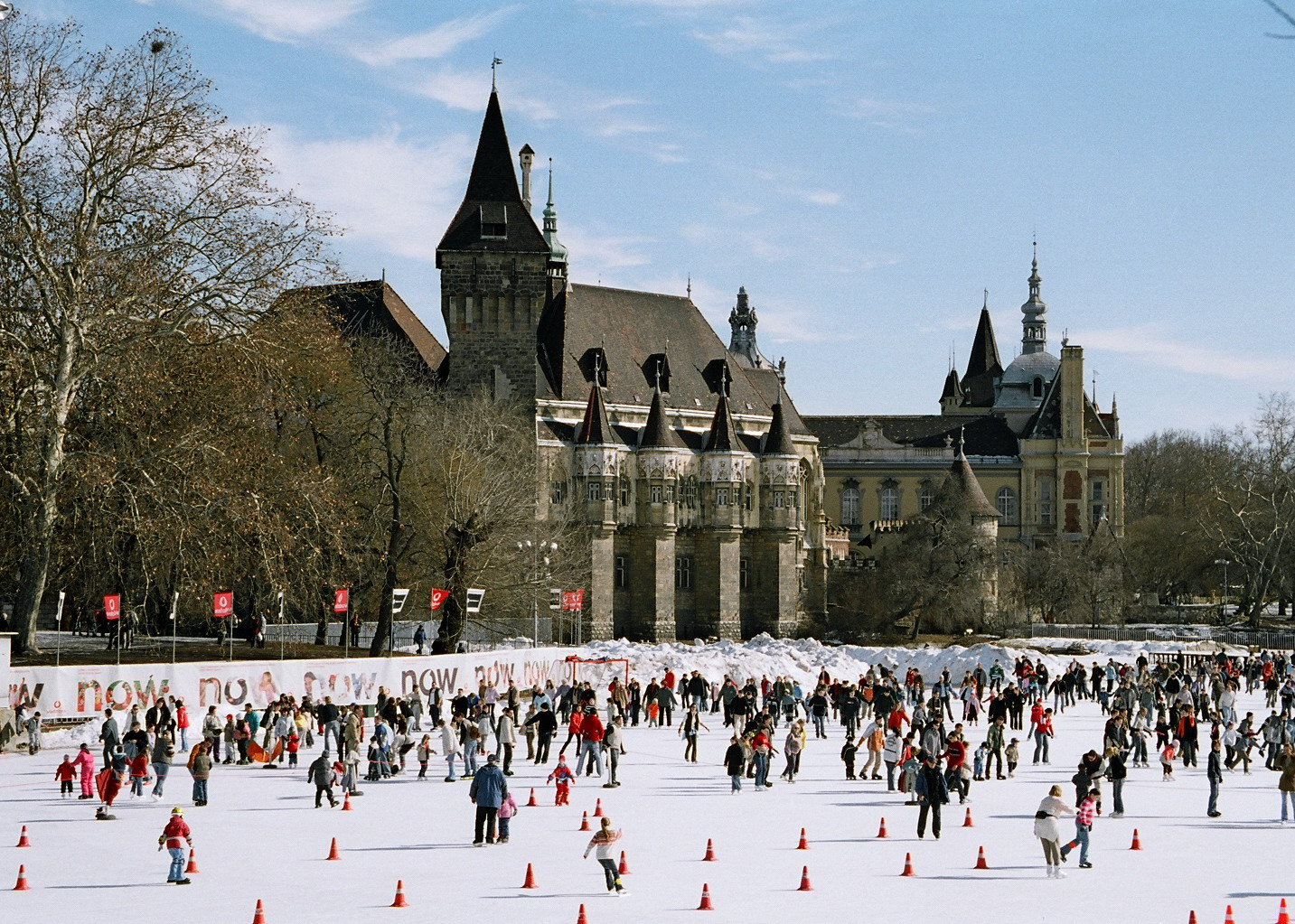
City Park Ice Rink, with Vajdahunyad Castle in the background

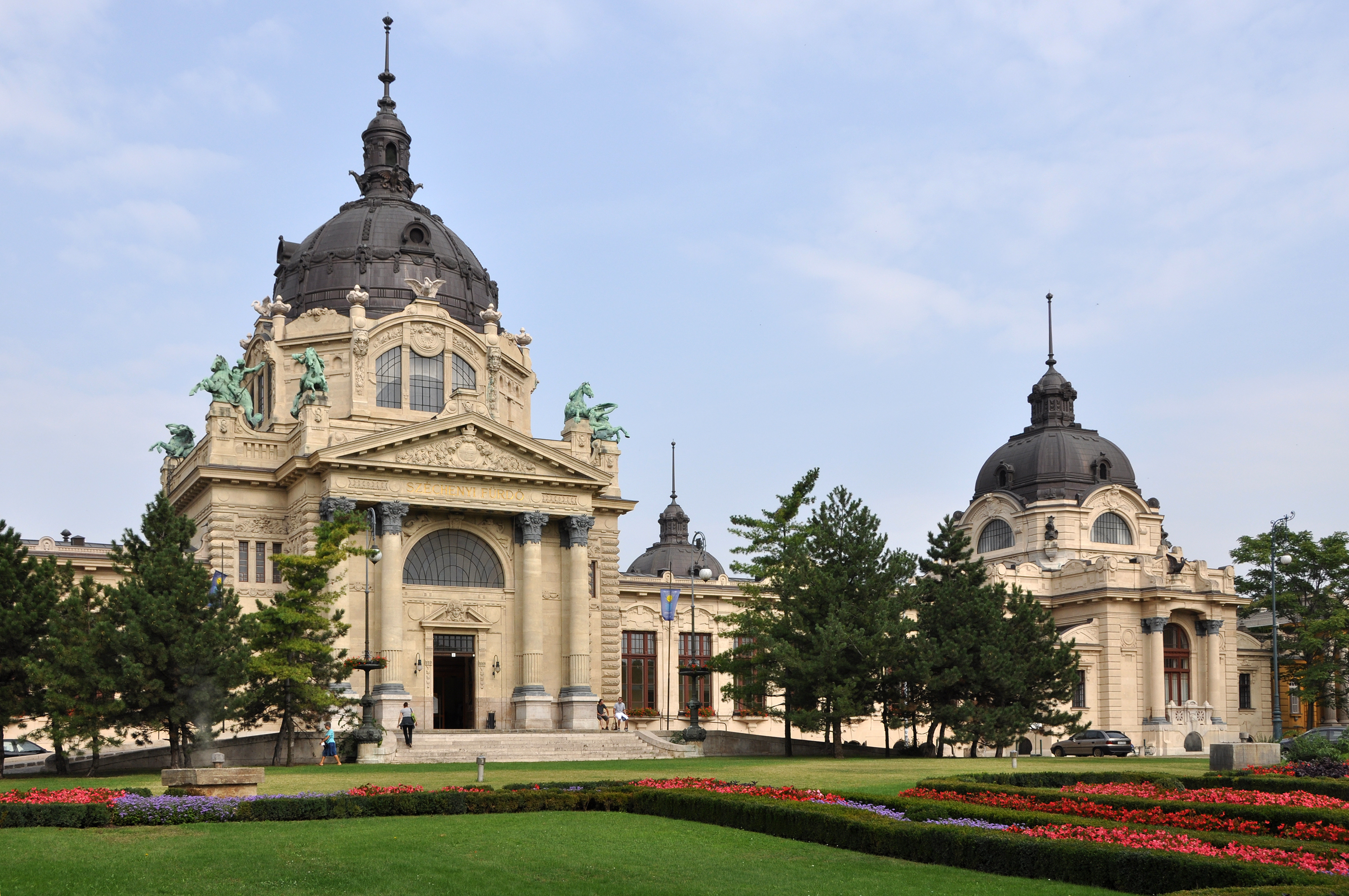
Széchenyi thermal bath

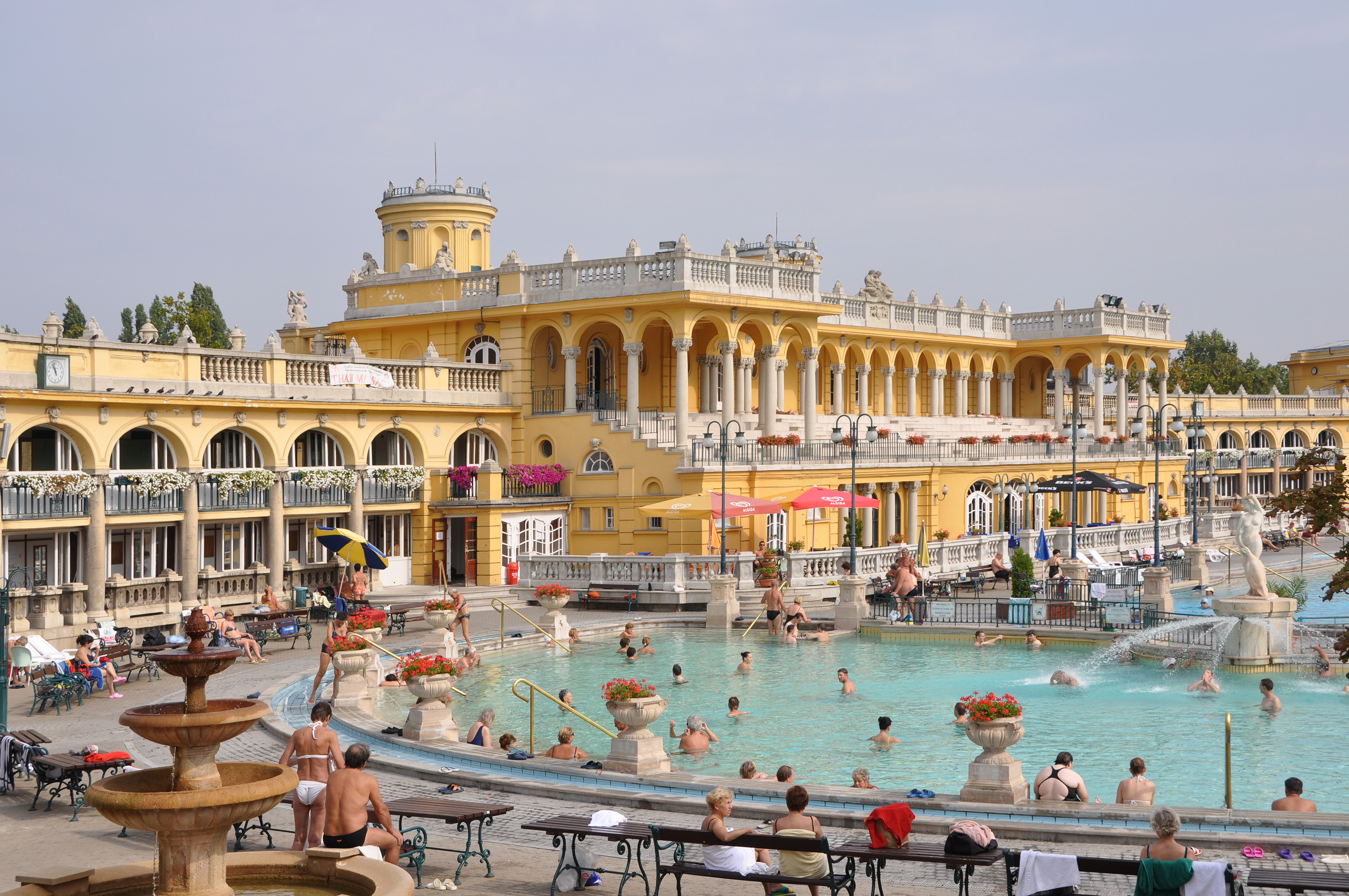
Széchenyi thermal bath

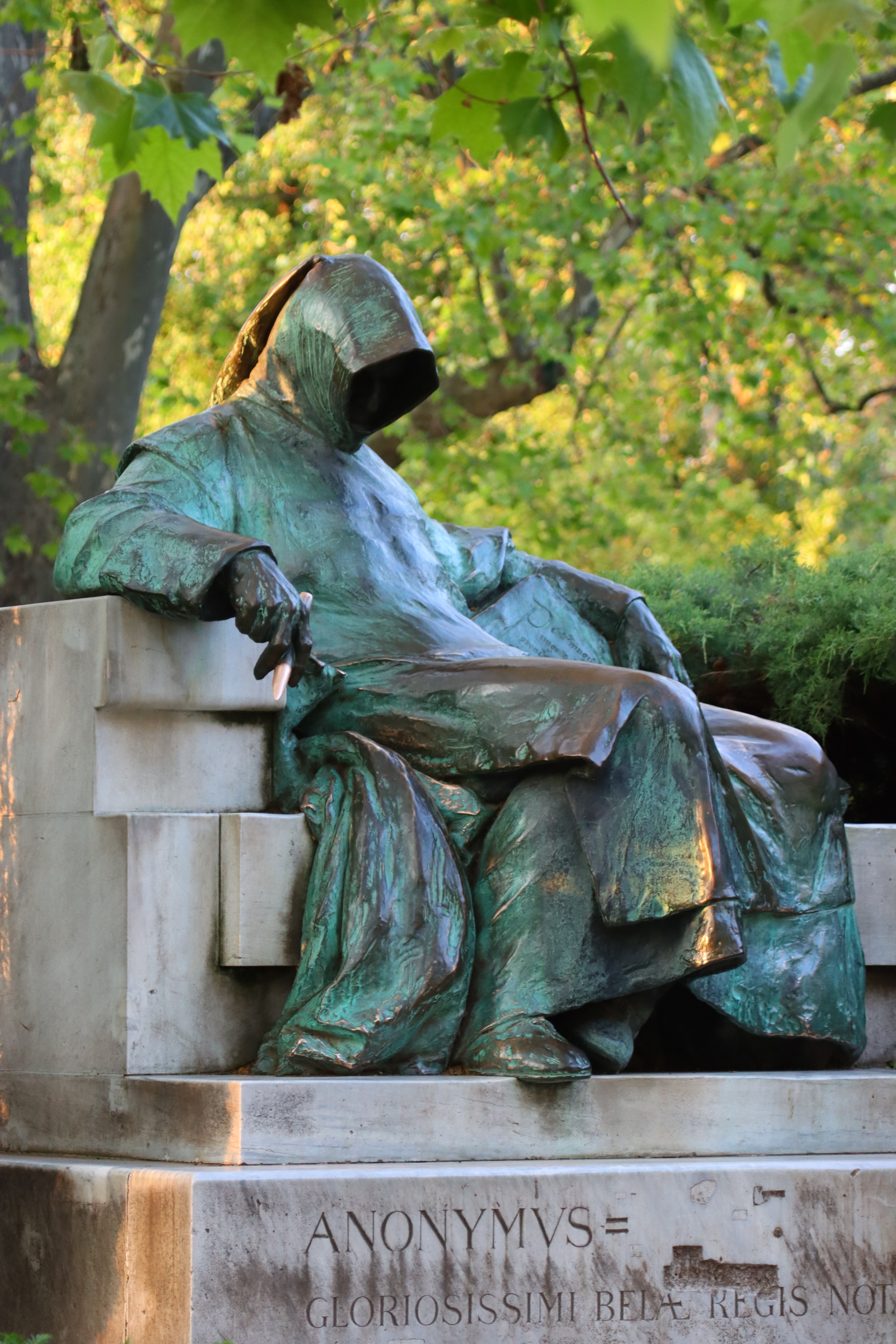
Anonymus statue in Vajdahunyad Castle

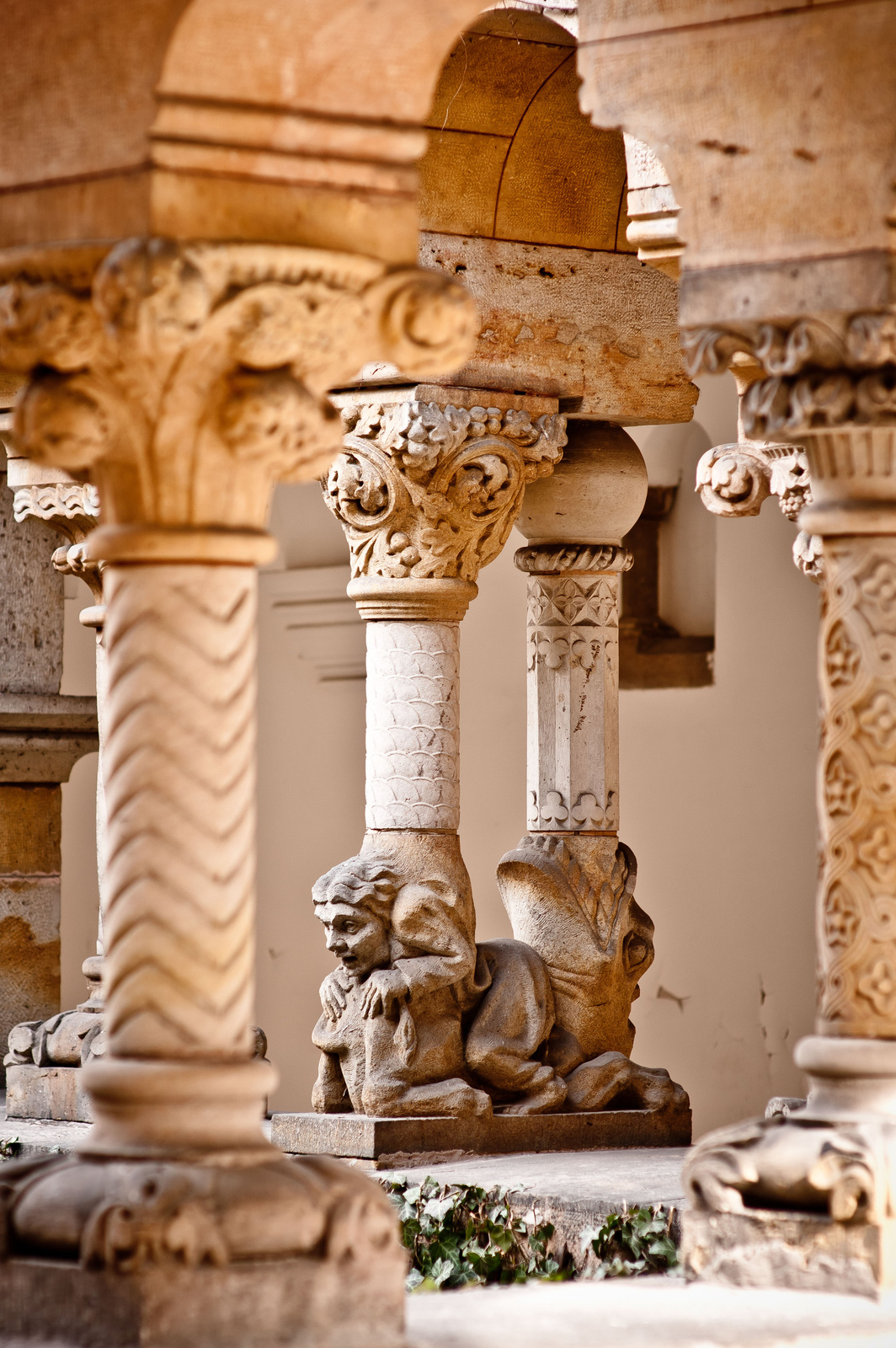
Vajdahunyad Castle

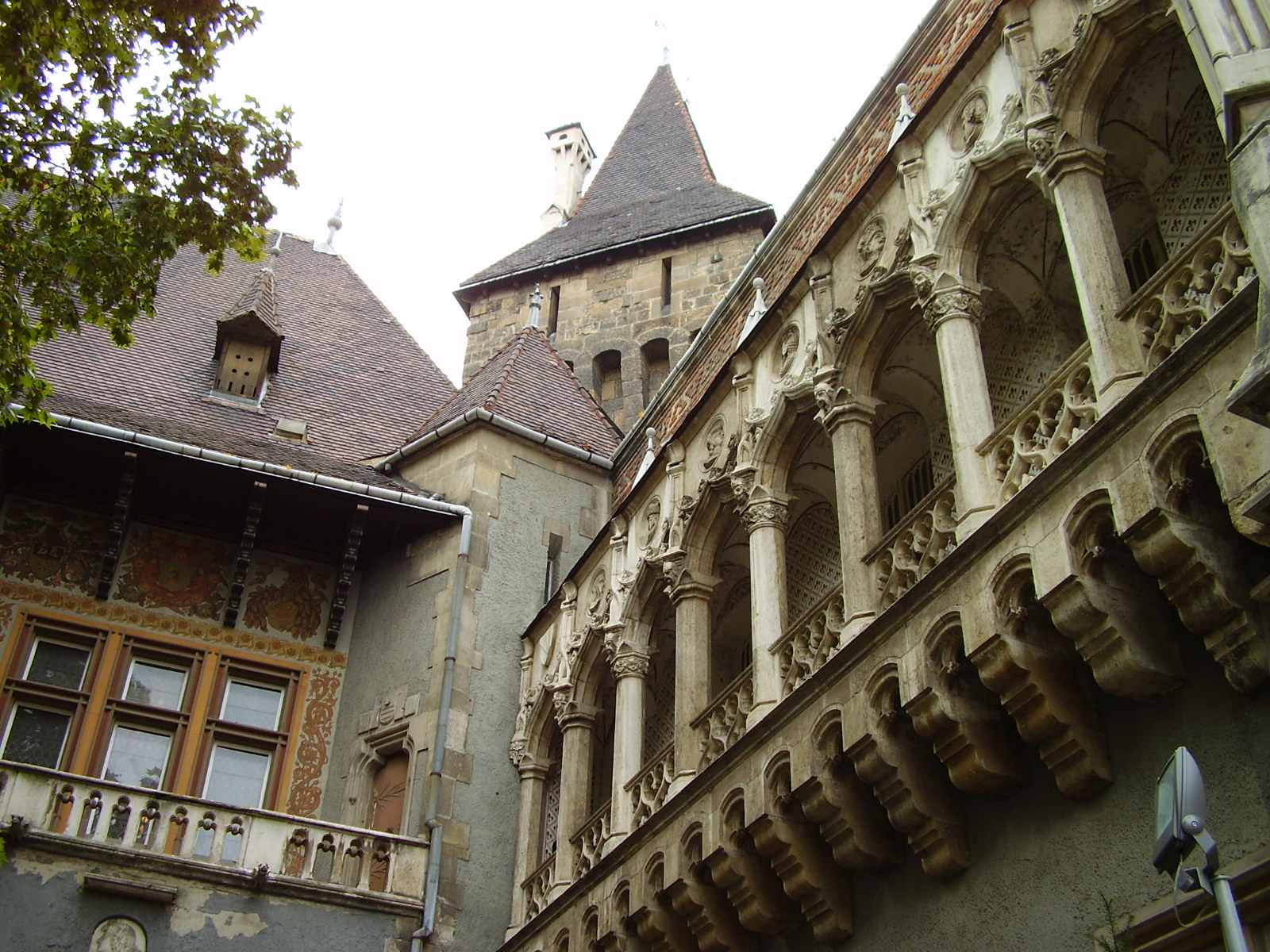
Vajdahunyad Castle

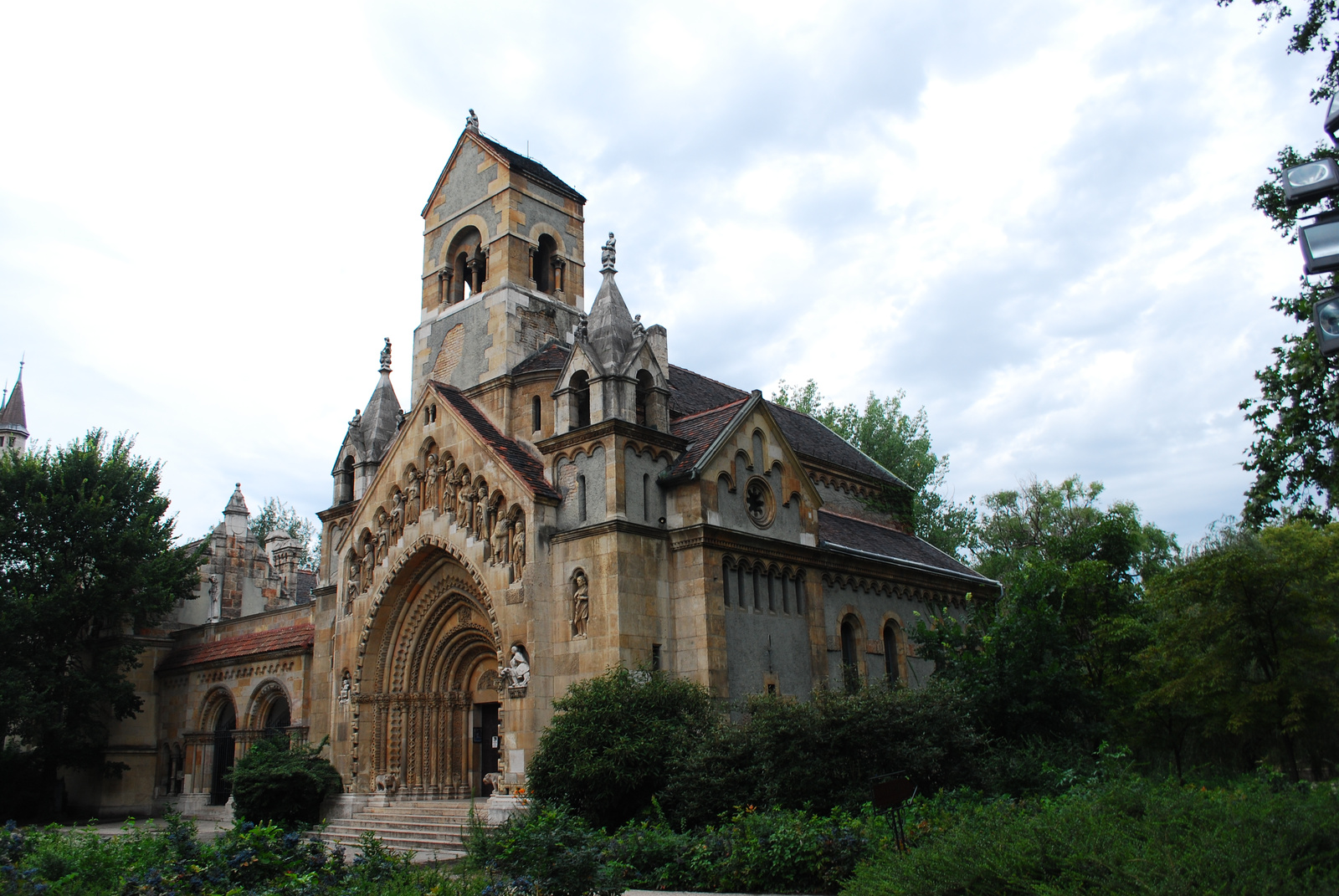
Chapel in Vajdahunyad Castle

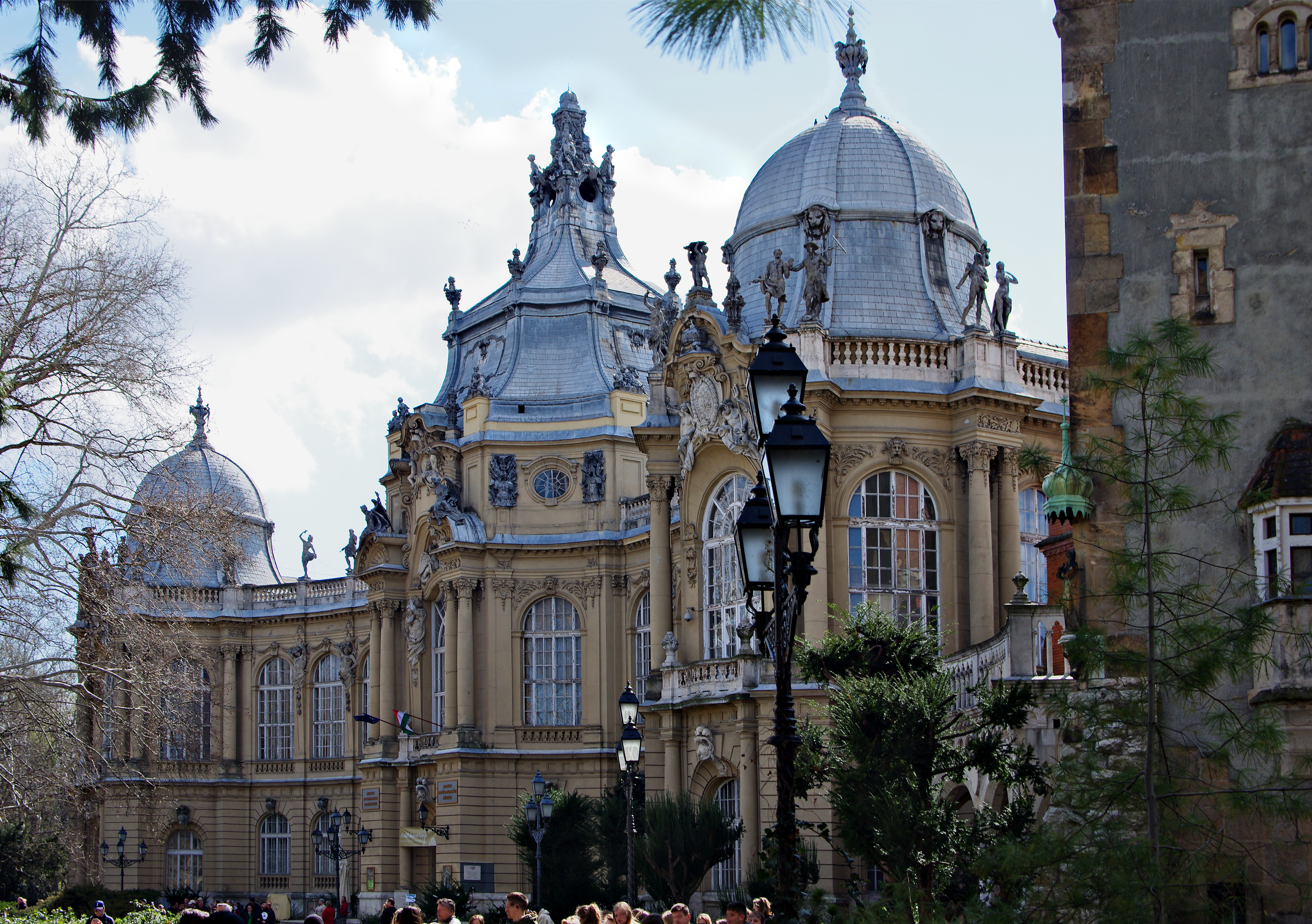
Museum of Hungarian Agriculture

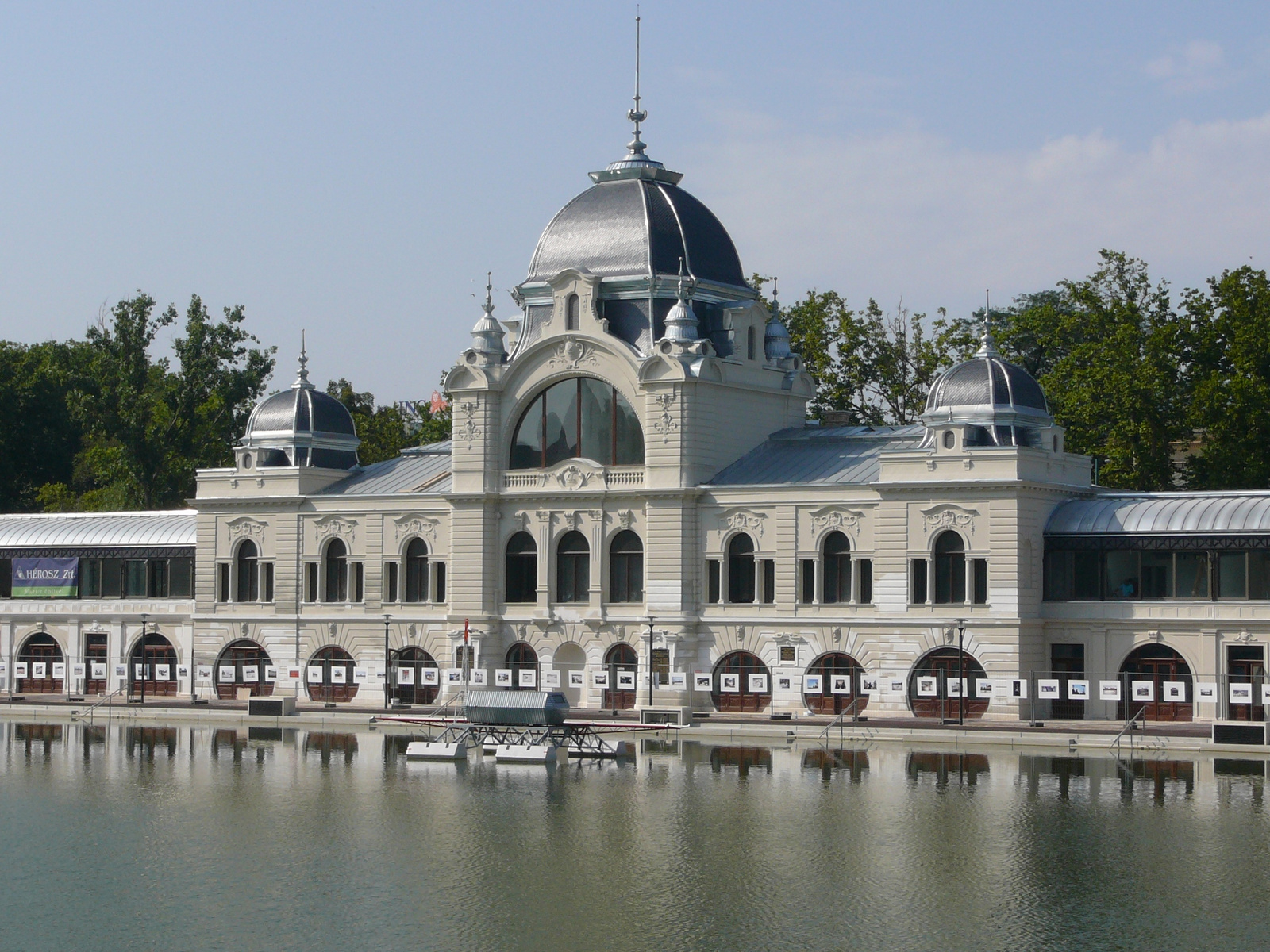
City Park Ice Rink

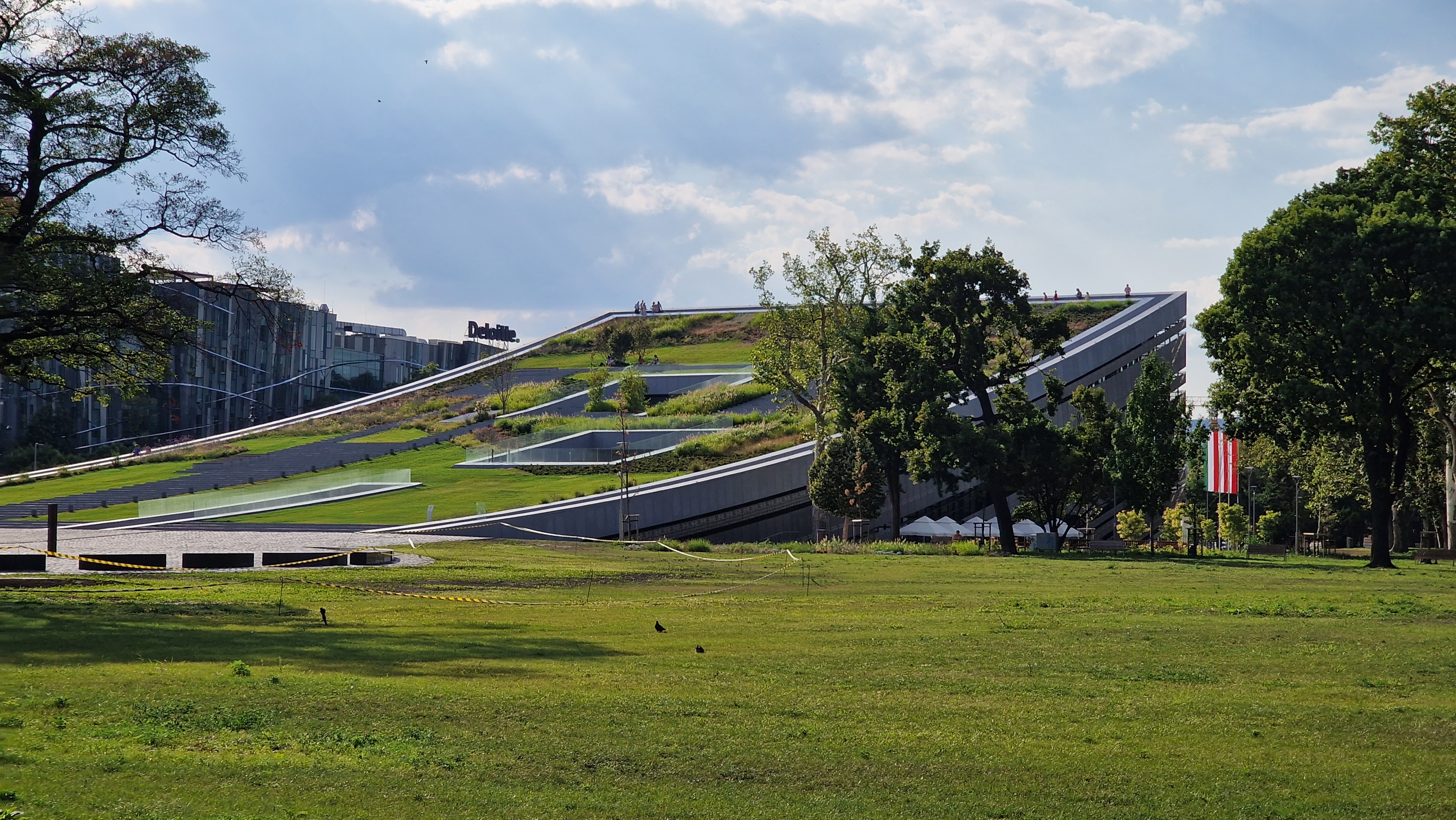
Museum of Ethnography

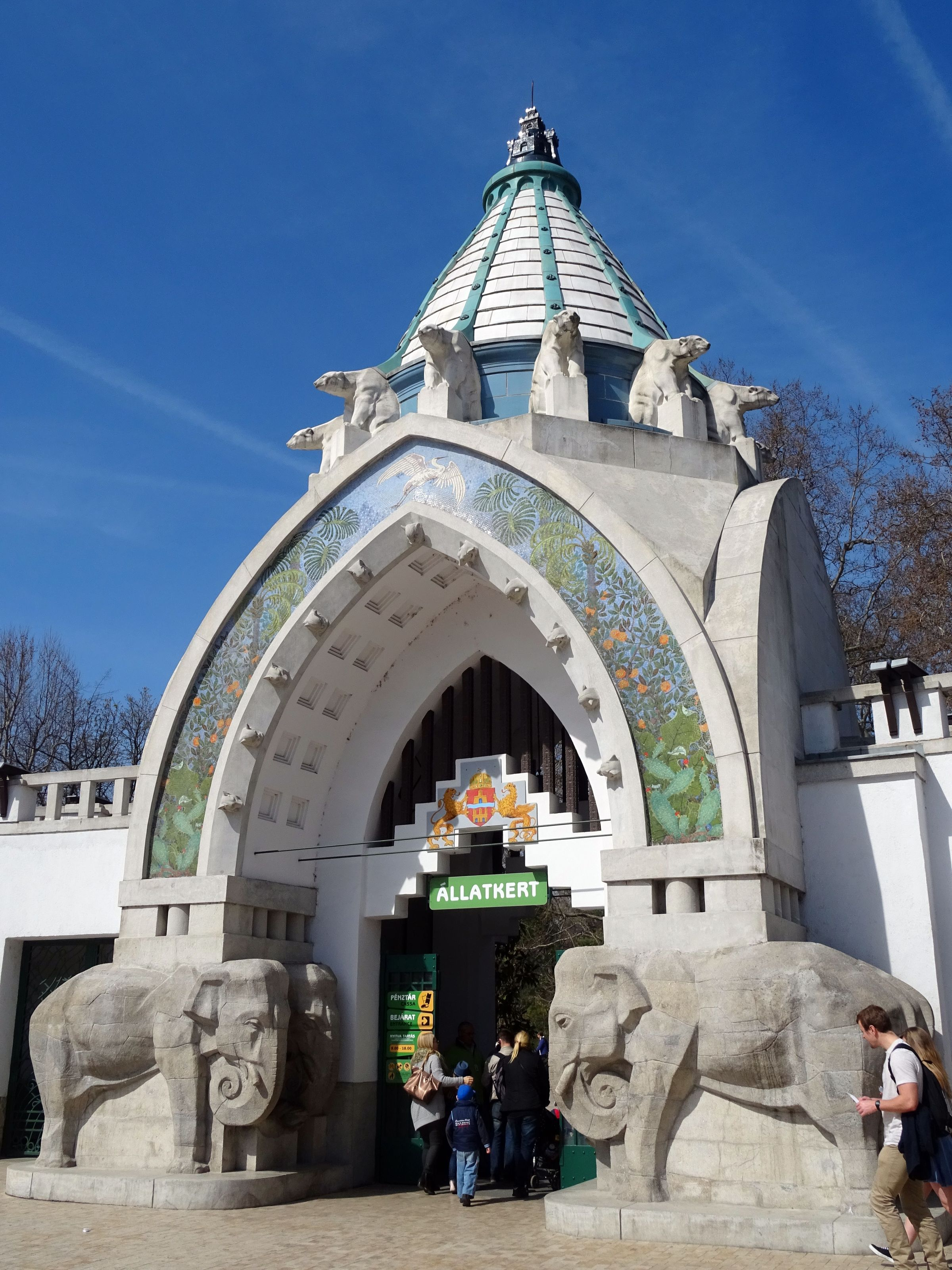
Budapest Zoo and Botanical Garden

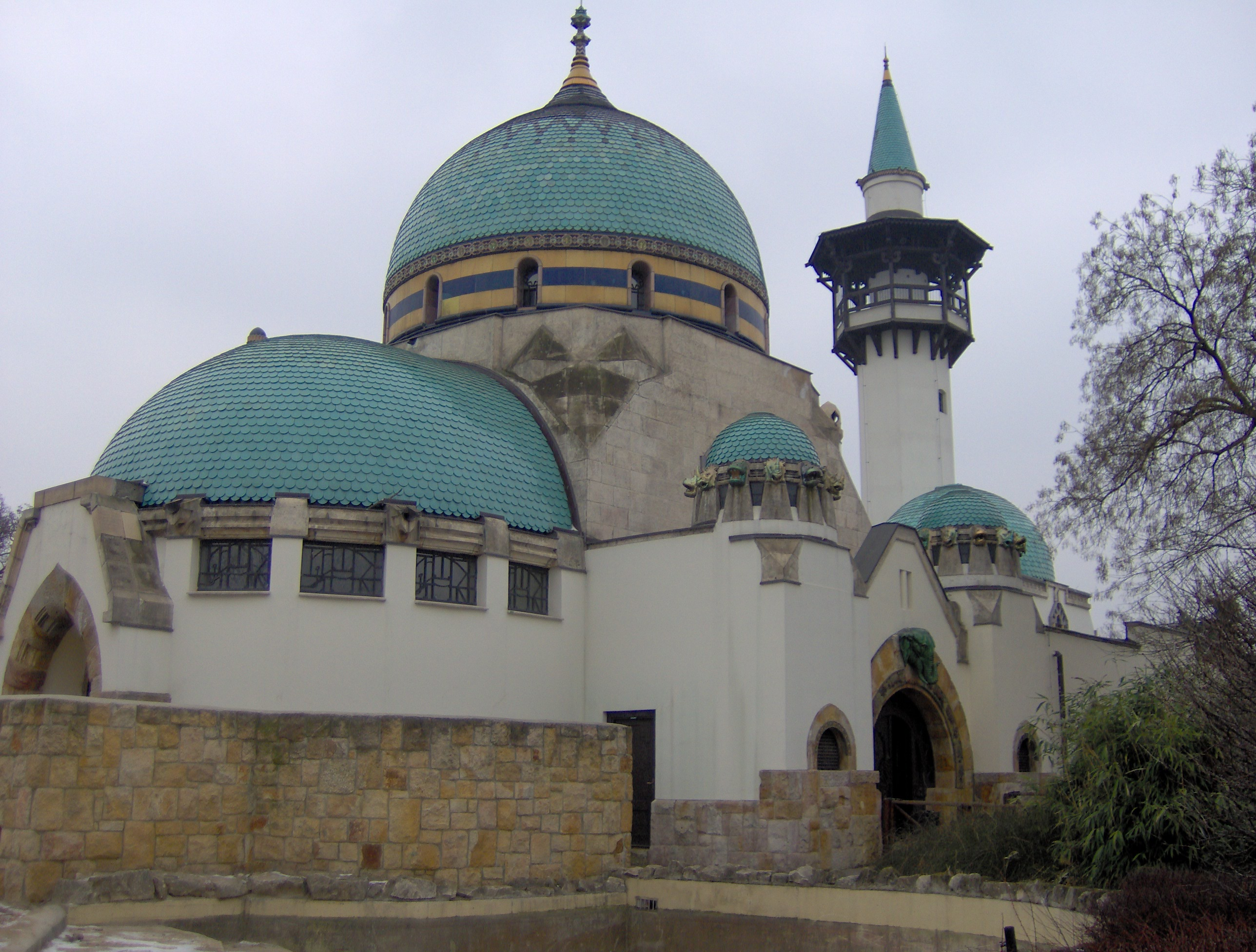
Elephant House, Budapest Zoo

== Map ==
Map of the park as of 2022:

1. – Gundel Restaurant
2. – Municipal Zoological and Botanical Garden
3. – Municipal Grand Circus
4. – Former Amusement Park
5. – Széchenyi Medicinal Baths and Swimming Pool
6. – Vajdahunyad Castle
7. – Former Petőfi Hall
8. – Former Transport Museum of Budapest
9. – Heroes' Square
10. – Museum of Fine Arts
11. – Palace of Art

== Attractions ==
The statue of Anonymus, the unknown chronicler at the court of King Béla III (r 1172–96), known as Anonymous, is in the courtyard of Vajdahunyad Castle, within the park.

The House of Music Hungary, part of Liget Budapest, designed by Japanese architect Sou Fujimoto, opened in January 2022, and the Museum of Ethnography opened on 23 May 2022.

City Park also includes:

- Széchenyi thermal bath
- Budapest Zoo, opened in 1866
- Gundel Restaurant, opened in 1894
- Budapest Circus Building, where the first performance was held in 1891
- City Park Ice Rink, originally opened in 1870

== See also ==
- People's Park (Népliget)
- Margaret Island (Margitsziget)
