= Museum of Ethnography (Budapest) =

Museum in Budapest, Hungary

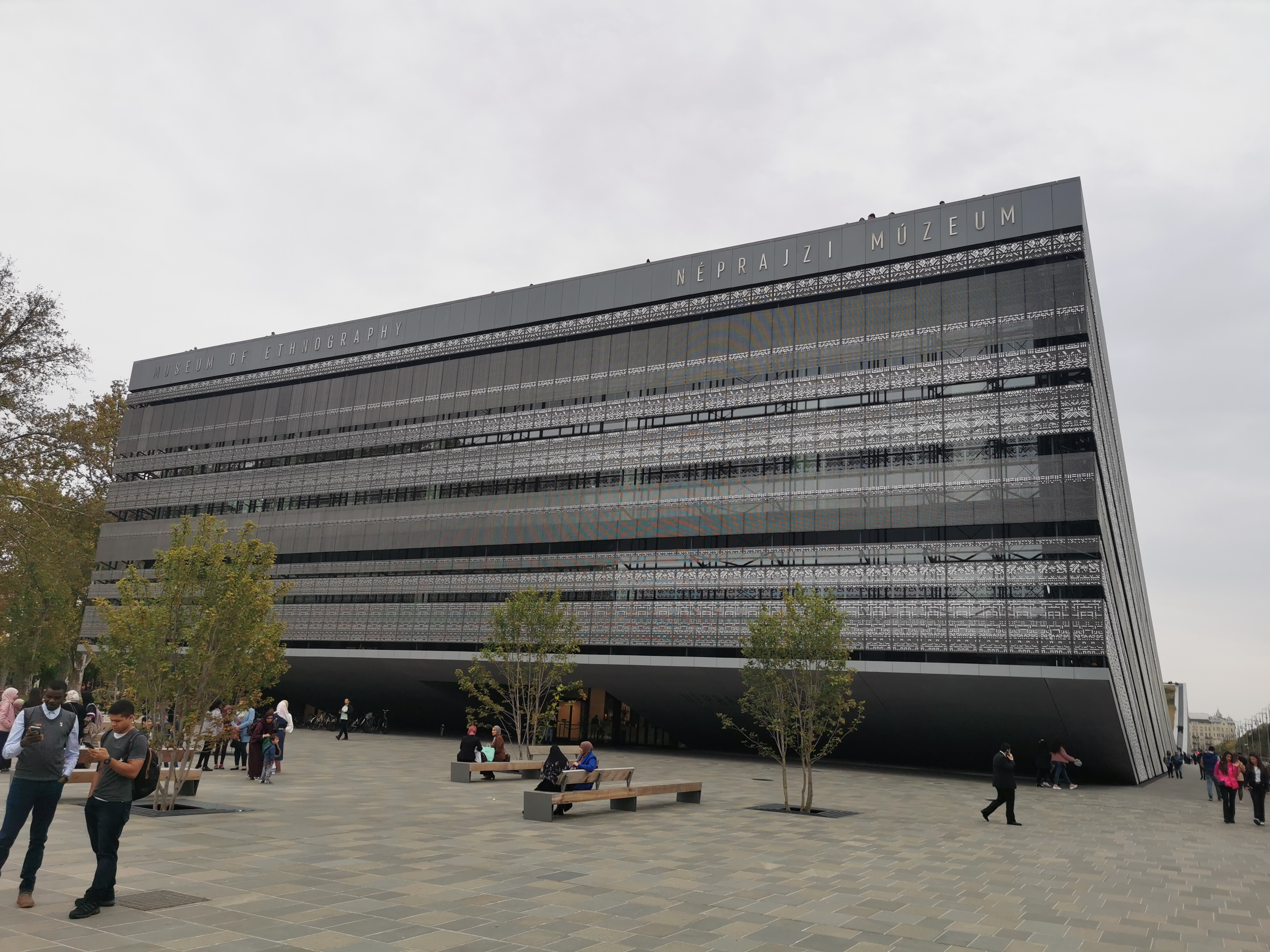
- The Museum of Ethnography
- Interactive fullscreen map
- Established: 1872
- Location: Dózsa György út 35, Budapest, Hungary
- Coordinates: 47°30′41″N 19°04′53″E
- Type: Ethnography
- Website: www.neprajz.hu/en/

The Museum of Ethnography (Hungarian: Néprajzi Múzeum, pronounced [ˈneːprɒjzi ˈmuːzɛum]) is a national museum in Budapest, Hungary.

== History ==
It was founded as the Ethnographic Department of the Hungarian National Museum in 1872. Its first director was John Xantus de Vesey. It formally split from the National Museum in 1947.

Despite the Museum of Ethnography's status as an institution of rank and prestige, the past 150 years of its history have been largely determined by a continuous struggle to maintain its facilities and keep its collections safe. Founded in 1872 as part of the Hungarian National Museum, the institution received its first independent home in 1892 in the form of the neo-Renaissance Várkert Bazár building near Budapest's Castle District. A year later, however, inadequate conditions forced it to move to an apartment building in Csillag utca. It was in this location that, in 1898, its first permanent exhibition was born. Though in 1906, the museum was once more moved to the Millennial Exhibition's then-empty Hall of Industry, in 1924, storm damage to its collection prompted yet another relocation, this time to an empty secondary school building on Könyves Kálmán út in Budapest's Tisztviselőtelep neighbourhood (Népliget). In 1929, the museum again opened its doors, its extraordinarily diverse and colourful collections on Hungarian folk and world cultures displayed across thirty of the school's rooms. Decades later, in 1975, the museum moved into the palatial Hall of Justice opposite the building of the Hungarian Parliament.

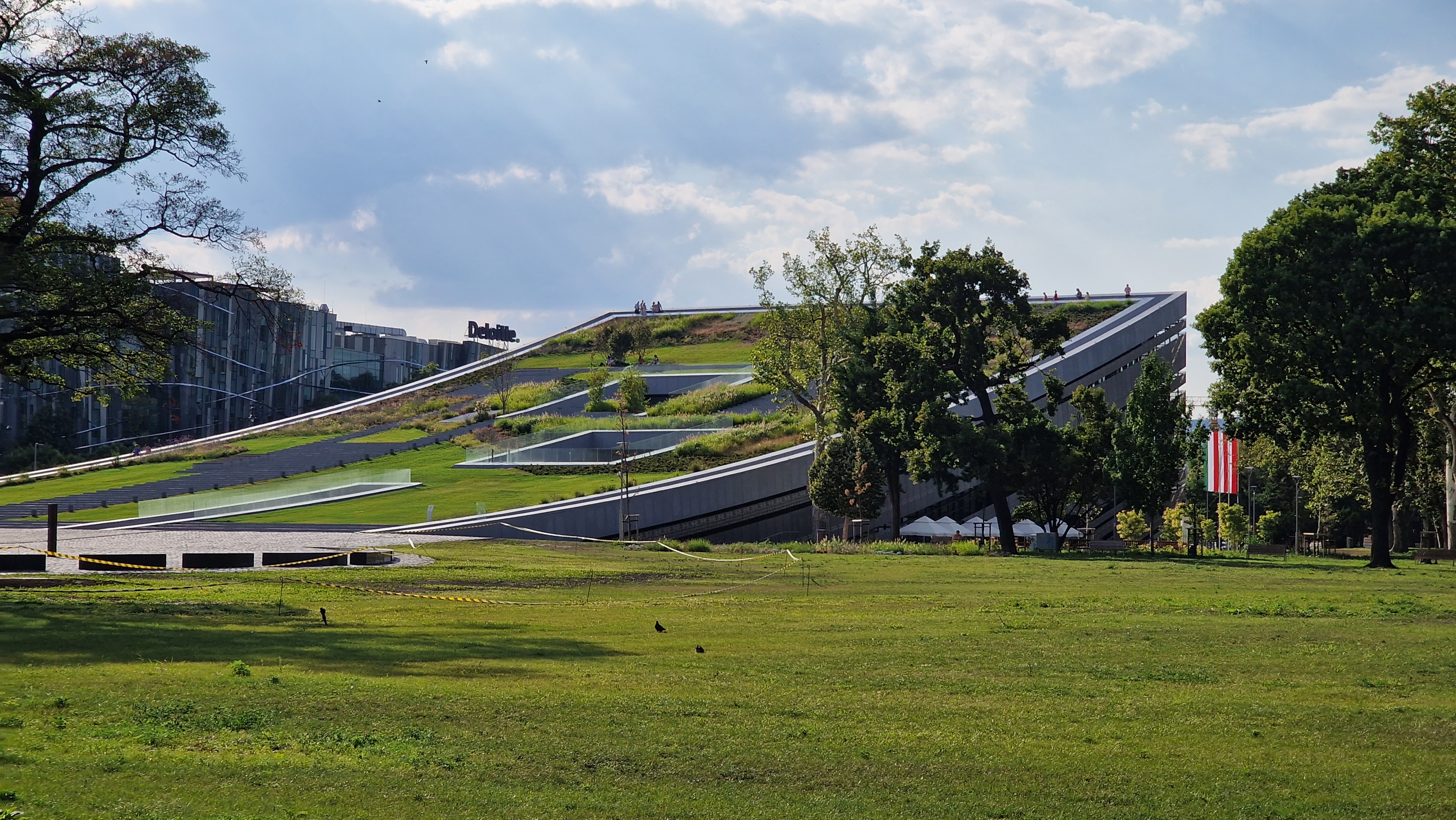
Museum of Ethnography building in Budapest, Hungary

The Museum of Ethnography's new home has been constructed in City Park, one of the oldest green spaces in the city, based on designs by Napur Architect Ltd. The new building will open in May 2022.

== Collection ==
The Museum of Ethnography's Africa Collection, also encompassing the island of Madagascar, currently comprises around 10,500 objects, while the Asia Collection contains around 13,000 objects, four-fifths of which were acquired by the museum between the late 19th and early 20th century. In quantitative terms, the two biggest subgroups within the Asia Collection comprise objects originating from Japan and China, followed by India, the Amur region, Mongolia, Turkey, the Caucasus, and Turkestan. The Oceania Collection is, in many respects, one of the museum's most significant collections. It is recognised internationally partly for its size and composition, and partly because of the period in which the collecting work took place. Three-quarters of the 14,500 objects that make up the collection were acquired at the turn of the 19th and 20th centuries, a period when this region was still largely untouched from an ethnographic point of view. The core of the Indonesia Collection, which currently comprises some 4,000 items, was collected between the end of the 19th century and the outbreak of the First World War. Half of the material in the collection comes from two narrow geographical areas: Java and Borneo.

The Europe Collection, which contains around 10,000 items, is one of the Museum of Ethnography's first collections. In the 19th century, collecting work tended to be focused on the Finno-Ugric peoples who were ethnically related to the Hungarians. However, from the early 20th century, particular emphasis was given to collecting objects from the nationalities living in the Austro-Hungarian Monarchy and the territories that belonged to it. The vast majority of the collected items are embroidered textiles, as well as musical instruments, metal objects, leather belts, jewellery, and ceramics. Comprising around 8,300 items, the America Collection is the smallest of the museum's non-European collections, although its origins date back to the foundation of the museum itself, as it includes objects collected by the museum's founder, János Xántus, in the 1850s and 1860s.

Besides the tasks of conserving, researching, and presenting this important international material, the museum plays a key role in strengthening Hungarian national identity. The materials from the Carpathian Basin, which date from the 17th century up to the end of the 20th century, preserve the traces of a bygone lifestyle — that of the peasants who made up a large proportion of Hungarian society until the middle of the 20th century. From the late 19th century, life in Hungary was radically transformed as a result of modernisation, urbanisation, and globalisation. In a race against time, researchers from the Museum of Ethnography successfully collected objects associated with the everyday existence, festivals and working lives of the Hungarians and other nationalities living in Hungary, preserving their knowledge for future generations. Through the tens of thousands of simple utilitarian and representative objects in its collections associated with traditional forms of subsistence (fishing, animal husbandry and herding, agriculture, and hunting and gathering), the museum illustrates the challenges people faced in the centuries before mechanisation, and the way of life in the fertile countryside criss-crossed by rivers. With around 13,000 objects, the Crafts and Trades Collection is the museum's fourth-largest collection of Hungarian materials. The Transportation Collection and the Building Construction Collection, comprising 1,500 objects associated with popular transportation, carriage, haulage, and communications and signalling, represent an important contribution to our knowledge of the history of technology. The Ceramics Collection, with its almost 30,000 objects, is one of the Museum of Ethnography's biggest collection units.

The Collection of Textiles and Costumes contains around 50,000 items, making it an outstanding thematic collection at European level. Besides the folk costumes and household textiles of the peasants, craftspeople, and herders living in the villages and market towns, all of which were characterised by an extraordinary wealth of ornamentation, motifs, and colours, the collection also encompasses the material culture of the wider population, including the urban lower middle class and intelligentsia.

The items in the Collection of Furniture and Lighting Instruments originate primarily from the territory of historical Hungary, chiefly from the Hungarians but also from the other ethnic groups living in Hungary. They include items of furniture, lighting instruments, home furnishings and interior decorations (clocks, mirrors, pipe racks, family portraits, and commemorative pictures), children's furniture (cribs, playpens, and walkers), and items used in everyday life (for bathing, washing, and heating). The Nutrition Collection comprises items used in relation to the storage, processing, and preserving of food, along with tableware that does not form part of other collections. The Collection of Religious Objects, the Collection of Customs and Toys, and the 1,000-piece Musical Instruments Collection contain objects and utensils associated with church life and community customs.

The Museum of Ethnography specialises not only in artefacts, but, from its very beginnings, has also endeavoured to collect and preserve intangible cultural heritage and materials associated with ethnographic research. Former contributors to the museum's work include such prominent figures as composers László Lajtha and Béla Bartók, whose sound recordings are preserved in the museum's collection of 4,500 phonograph cylinders. Their collecting work encompassed the musical traditions not only of Hungarians but also of other ethnic groups living in the Carpathian Basin, and, in Bartók's case, even extended to the Anatolian Turks and Algerian Arabs. This material makes up only a fraction of the Museum of Ethnography's tens of thousands of analogue audio recordings.

As part of the Ethnological Archives, the Film and Video Collection, which contains recordings made on ethnographic topics dating from the 1930s, is similarly unique. The museum's Photograph Collection, which comprises 340,000 items, is the largest collection of images of traditional peasant and folk culture in Hungary and also includes many photographs of the peoples of distant continents taken as early as the end of the 19th century.

The 30,000-item Manuscript Collection and the drawings, paintings, and prints preserved in the Image Archive attract international researchers, whose work is also supported by the museum's specialist library, which boasts 197,000 volumes.
