= Széchenyi thermal bath =

Széchenyi Thermal Bath
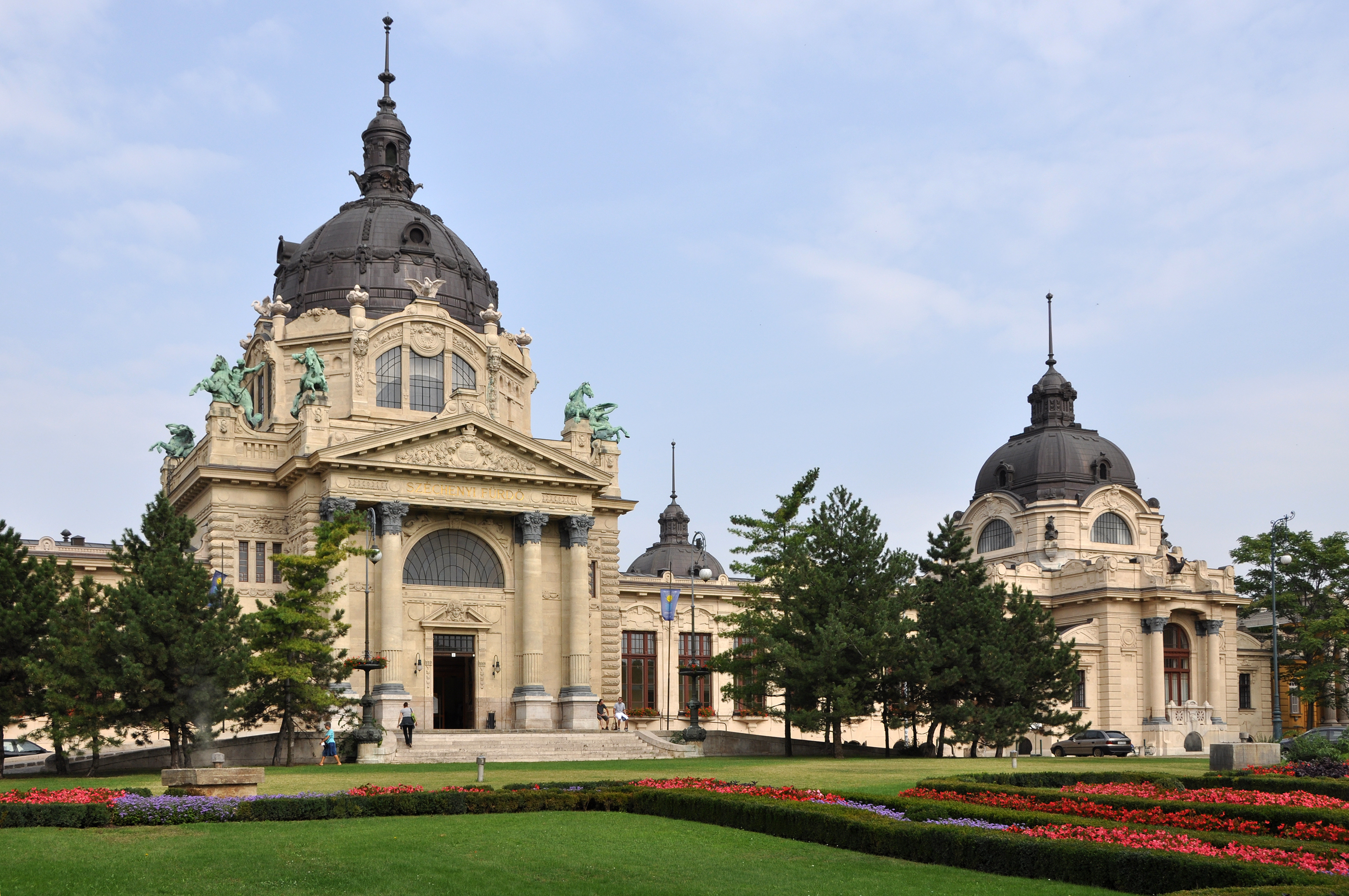

- Location within Budapest
- 47°31′07″N 19°04′55″E
- Location: City Park, Budapest, Hungary

History
- Built: 1913

Site notes
- Architect: Győző Czigler

The Széchenyi Medicinal Bath in Budapest (Hungarian: Széchenyi gyógyfürdő, pronounced [ˈseːt͡ʃeːɲi ˈɟoːɟfyrdøː]) is one of the largest spa complexes in Europe. Its water is supplied by two thermal springs, one at 74 °C (165 °F) and the other at 77 °C (171 °F).

Components of the thermal water include sulfate, calcium, magnesium, bicarbonate and a significant amount of metaboric acid and fluoride.

== History ==
Between 1868 and 1878 the mining engineer Vilmos Zsigmondy drilled an artesian well in the City Park, which reached water of 74.5 °C (166.1 °F) at a depth of 970 metres (3,180 ft). A small bath, the Artesian bath, was operating at the well by 1881.

During the planning phase from the 1880s, the bath had originally been referred to as the Artesian spa (Artézi fürdő), but when it opened in June 1913 it was named Széchenyi bath (Széchenyi gyógyfürdő) after István Széchenyi.

The bath, located in the City Park, was built in Neo-Baroque style to the design of Győző Czigler. Czigler died in 1905, and construction began in 1909 under the direction of his associates Ede Dvorák and Kálmán Gerster. The pool construction cost approximately 3.9 million Austro-Hungarian korona. The total area covered was 6,220 square metres (67,000 sq ft). More than 200,000 bathers visited the spa in 1913. This number increased to 890,507 by 1919. At that time the Bath consisted of private baths, separate steam-bath sections for men and women, and male and female "public baths". In 1924 the city decided to enlarge the bath, and Imre Francsek Jr. won the design competition from 35 entries. The extension, completed in 1927, added public baths for men and women and an outdoor section. The bath now has 3 outdoor and 15 indoor pools. It is now possible for both sexes to visit the main swimming and thermal sections.

After the expansion, the thermal artesian well could not supply the larger volume of water needed, so a new well was drilled. The second thermal spring was found in 1938 at a depth of 1,256 metres (4,121 ft), with a temperature of 77 °C (171 °F). It supplies 6,000,000 litres (1,600,000 US gal) of hot water daily. In the mid-1960s a further thermal section, where swimsuits are worn, and a day hospital were added. Between 1999 and 2009 the Széchenyi thermal bath was refurbished in a complete renovation.

== Units ==
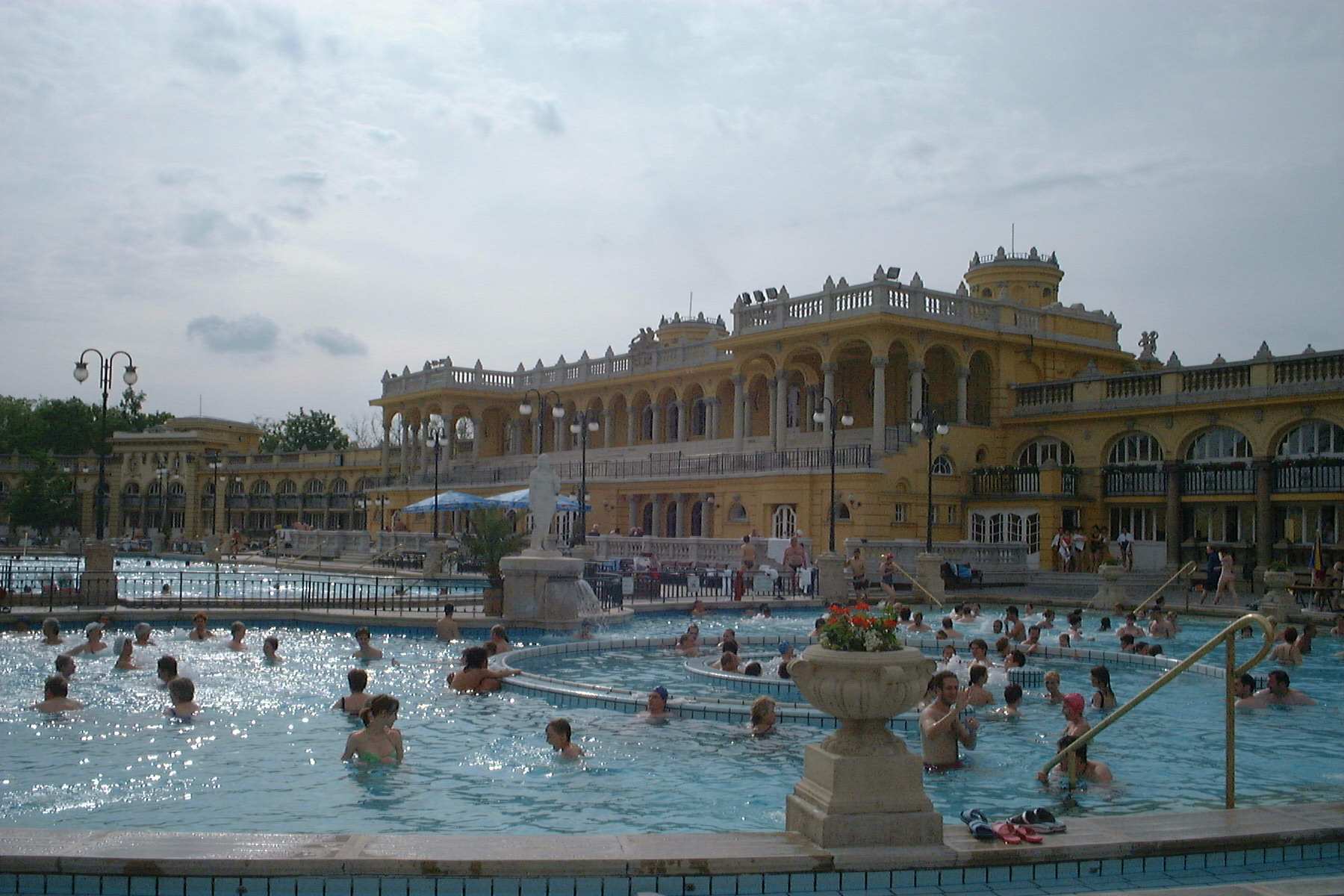
The bath during the day

The baths have pools of varying temperature. The outdoor pools (swimming pool, adventure pool and thermal sitting pool) are 27 to 38 °C (81 to 100 °F). The swimming pool's depth is 0.8 to 1.7 metres (2 ft 7 in to 5 ft 7 in). The adventure pool's depth is 0.8 metres (2 ft 7 in). The indoor pools are of varying temperatures, between 18 and 38 °C (64 and 100 °F). The complex also includes saunas and steam.

== Gallery ==
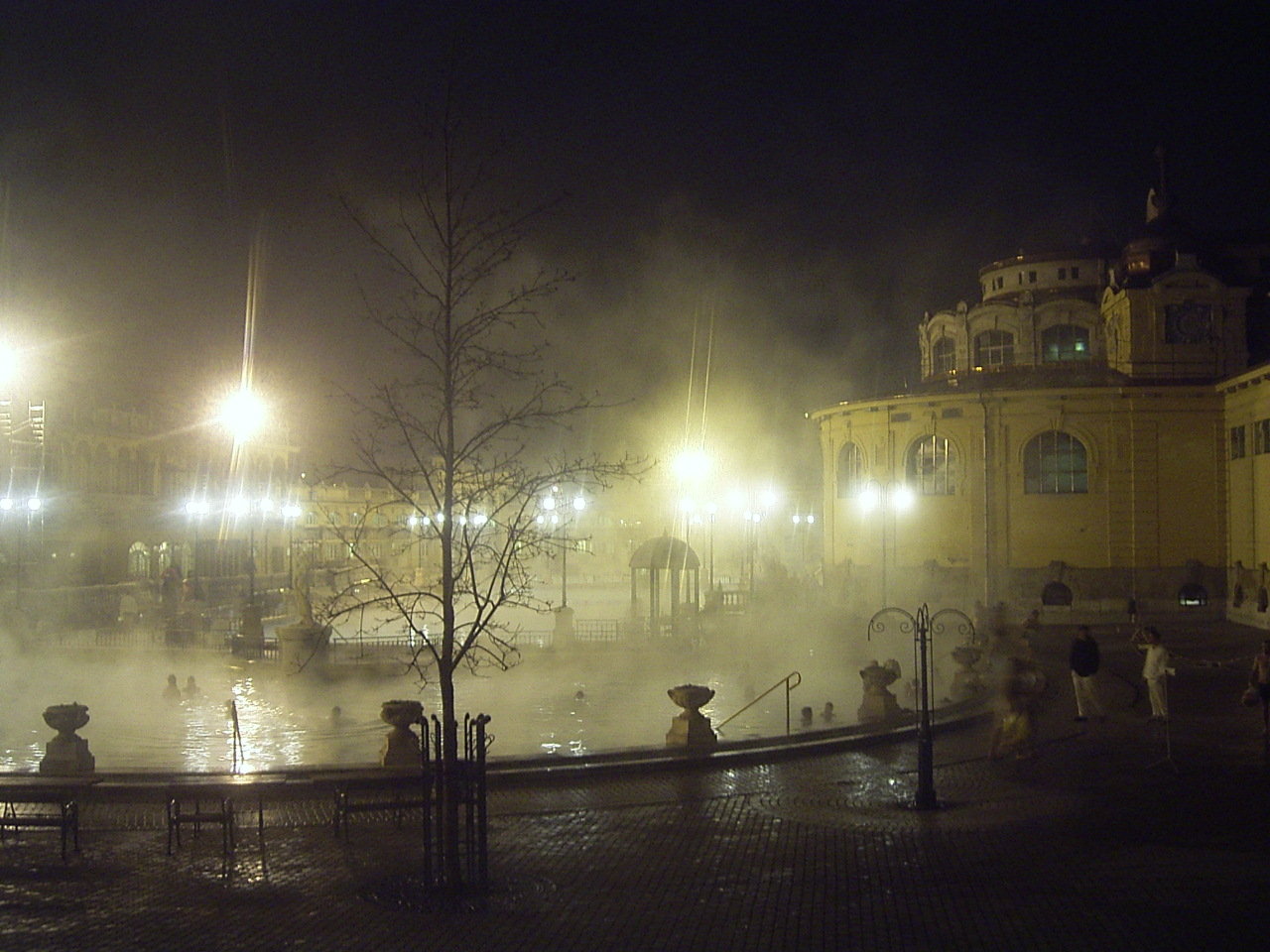
Steam rising from the baths at night.

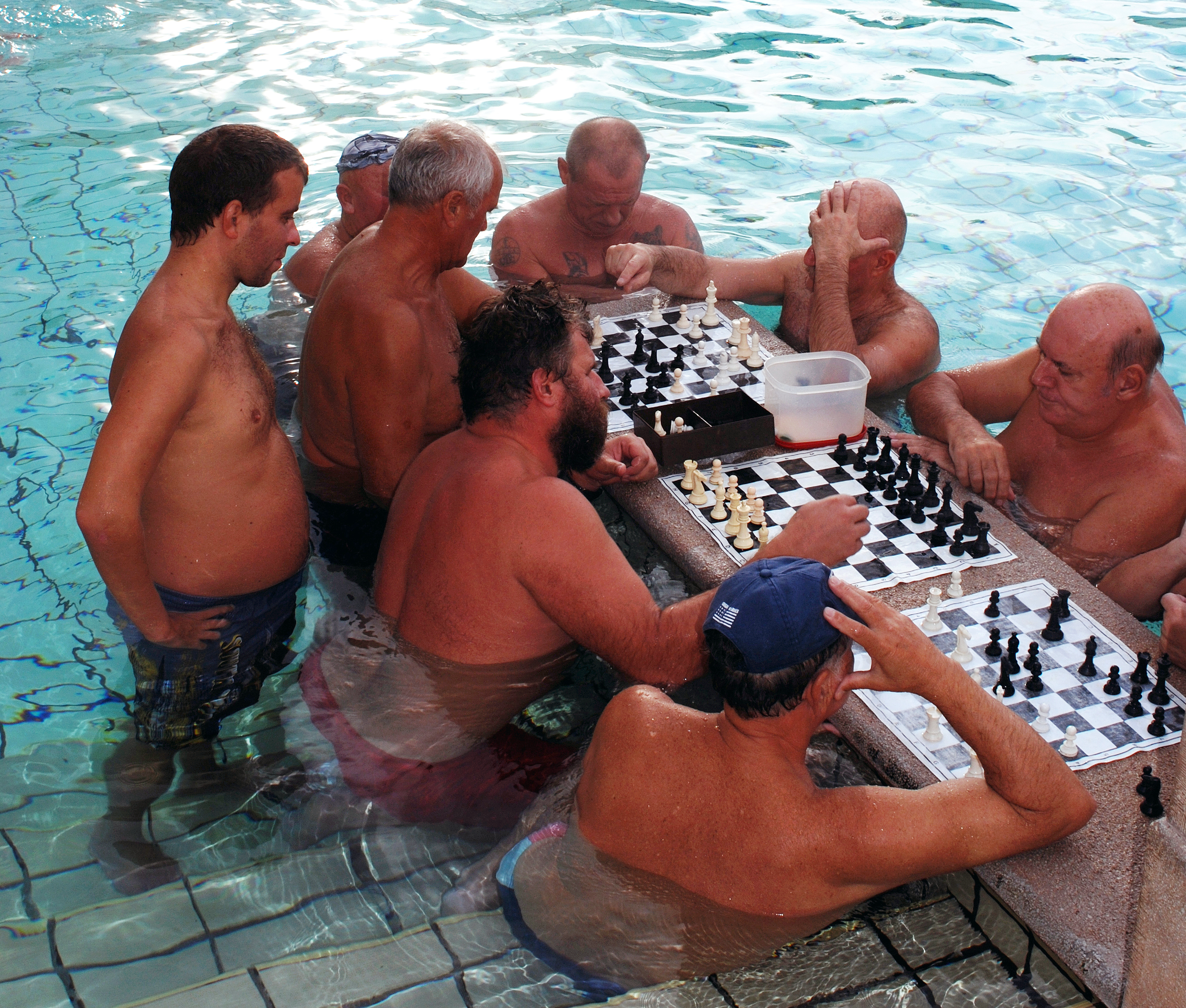
Men playing chess in the baths.

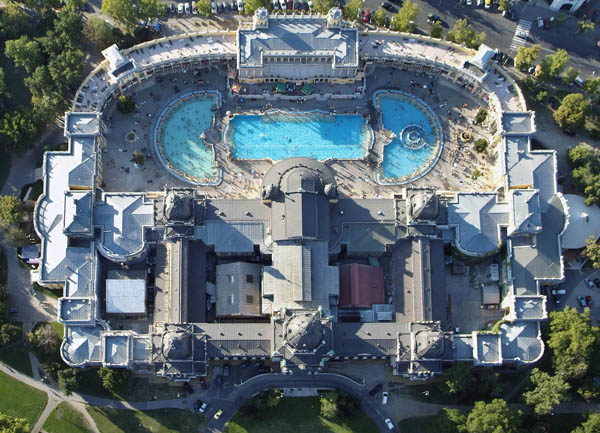
An aerial view of the bath complex.

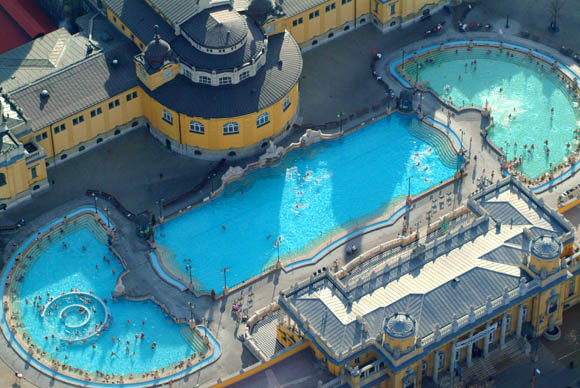
An aerial view of the three large outdoor baths.

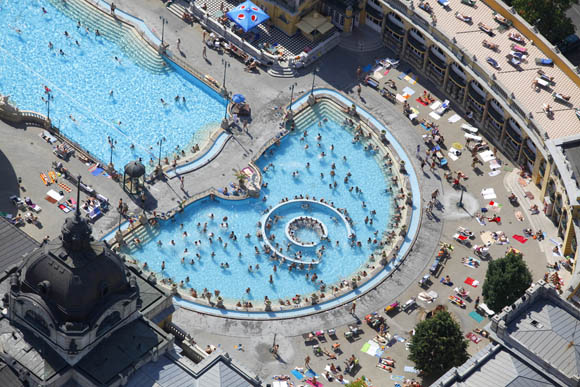

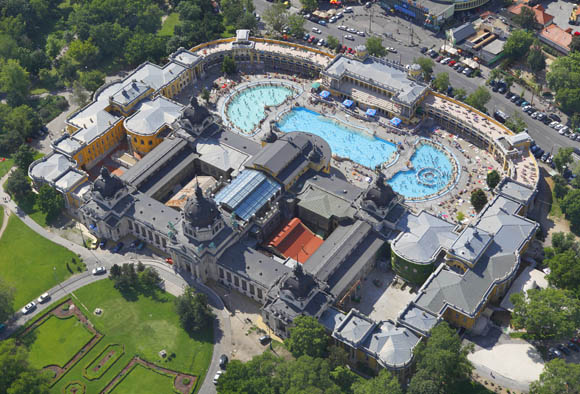

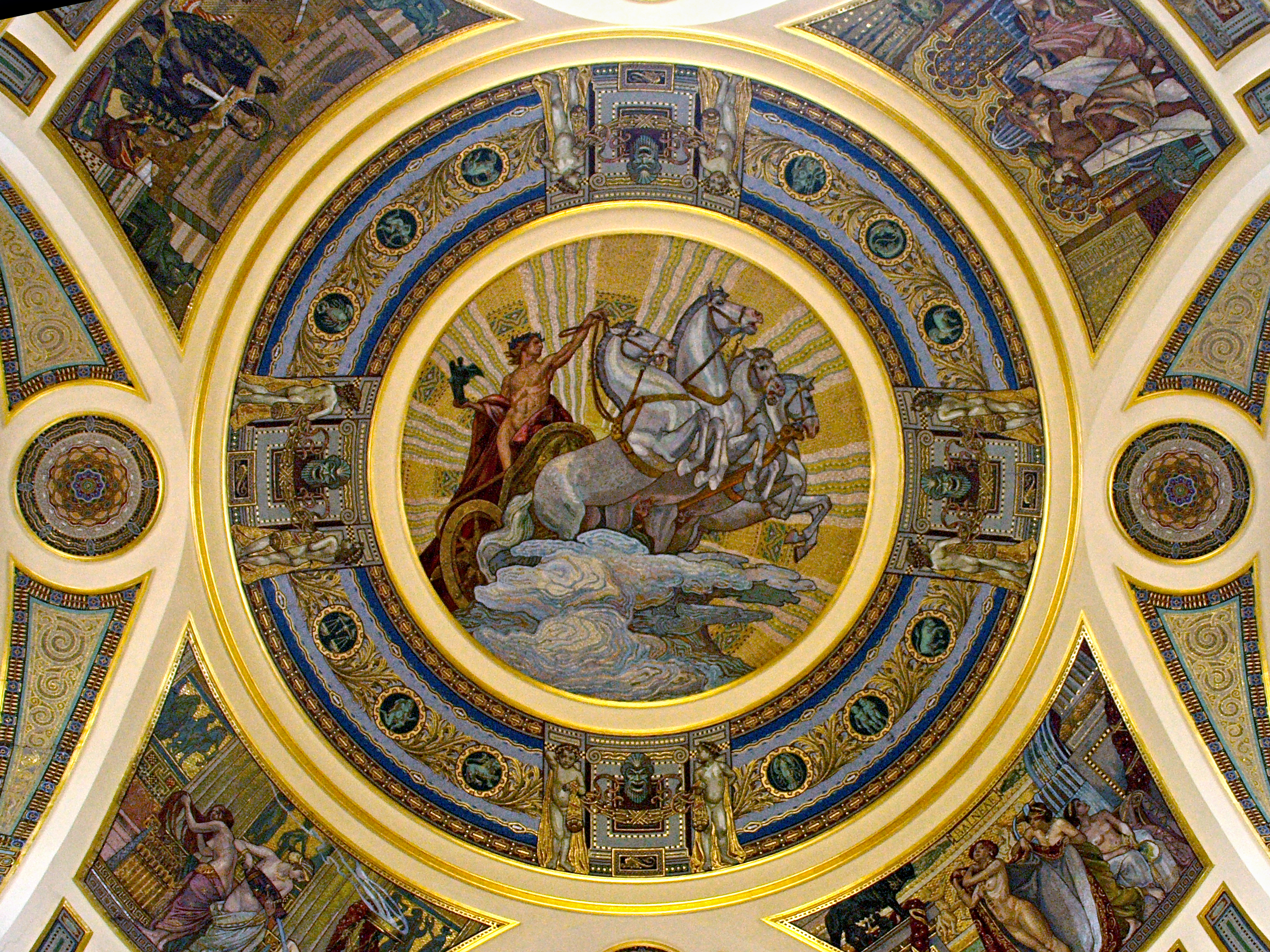

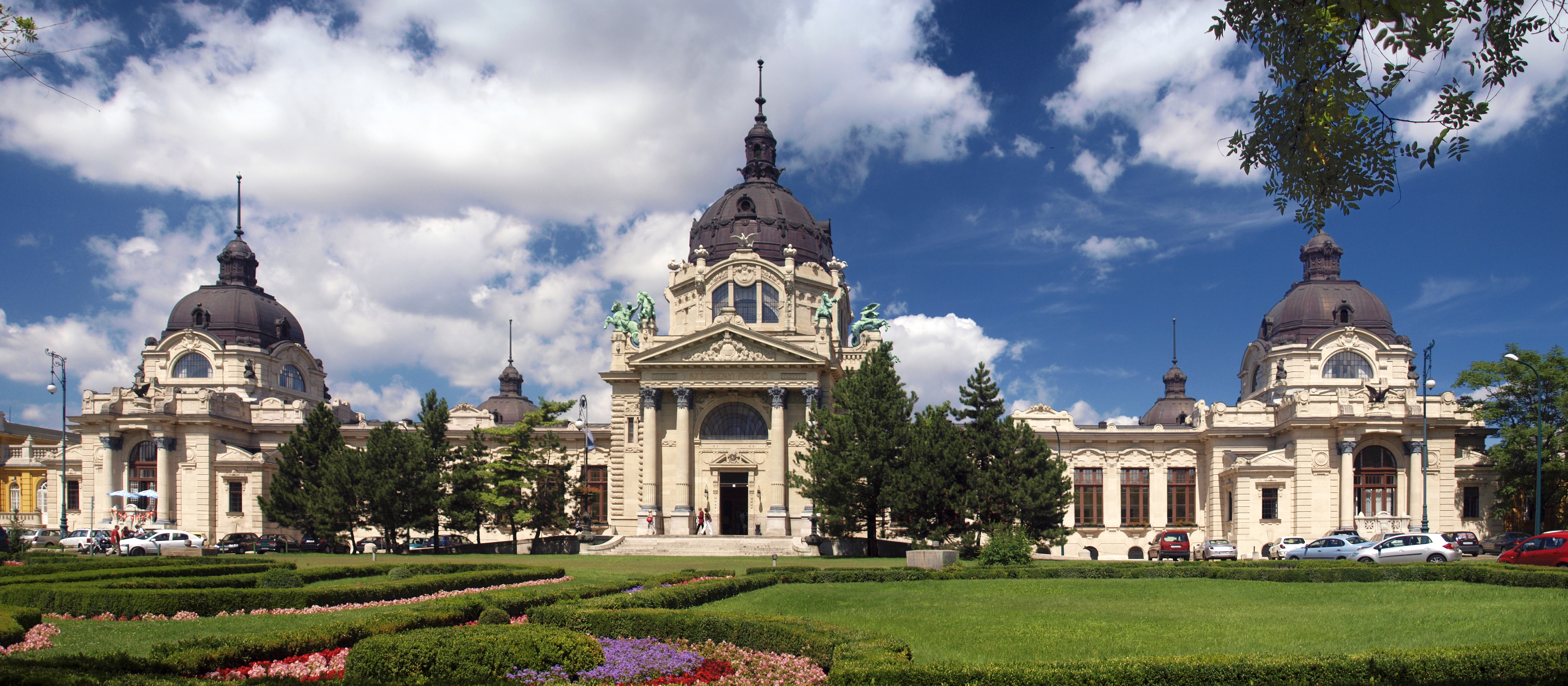
A view of the baths' Neo-Baroque architecture.
