= Vajdahunyad Castle =

Castle in Budapest City Park, Hungary

Coordinates: 47°30′55″N 19°4′55″E

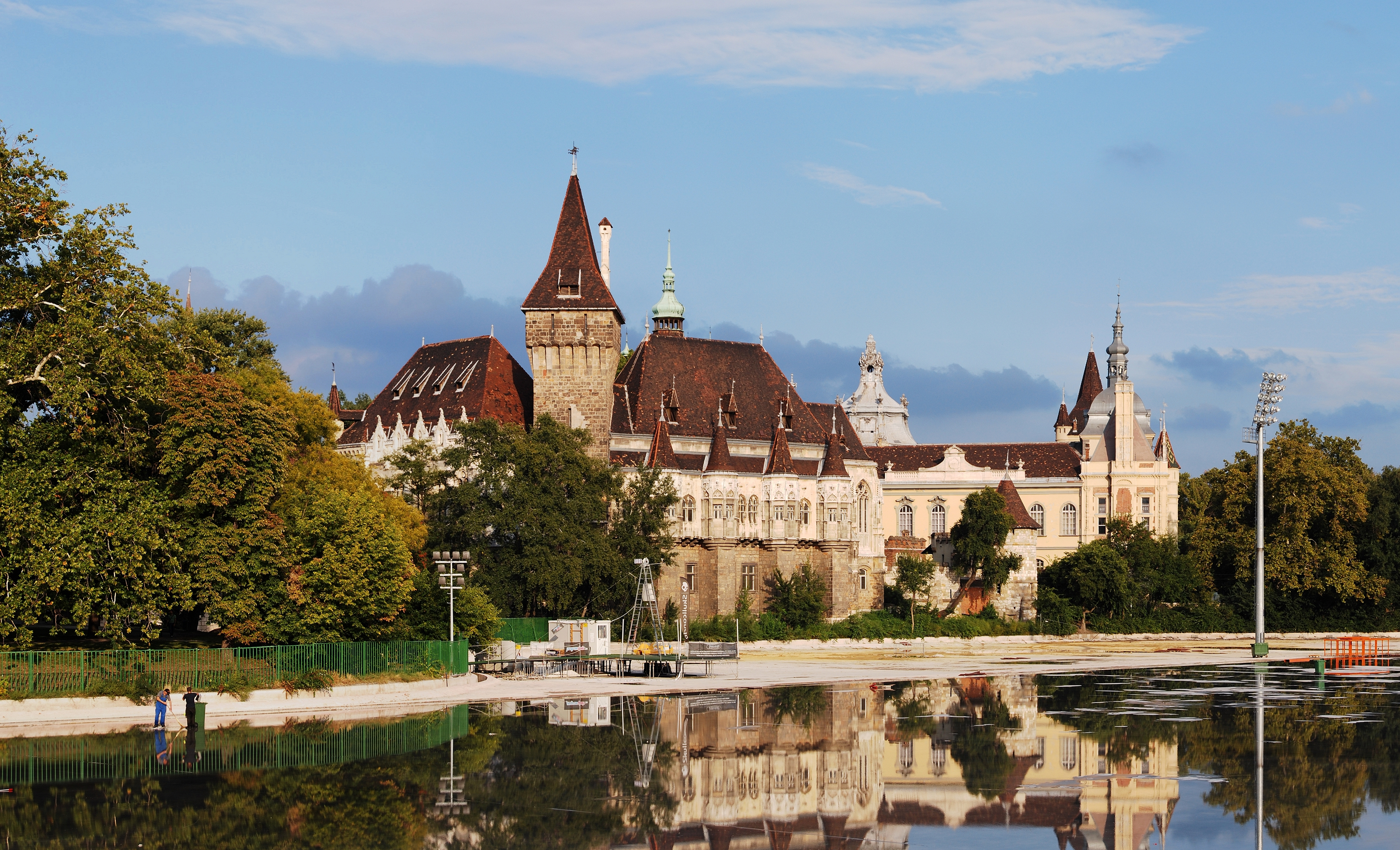
Vajdahunyad Castle viewed from its lakeside

Vajdahunyad Castle (Hungarian: Vajdahunyad vára) is a castle in the City Park of Budapest, Hungary.

== History ==
The castle was designed by Ignác Alpár and built in 1896 as part of the Millennial Exhibition, which celebrated the 1,000 years of Hungary since the Hungarian Conquest of the Carpathian Basin in 895. The original was a group of 21 copies of historical buildings, made mainly of wood and cardboard. It was rebuilt in brick and stone to Alpár's plans between 1904 and 1908. The Museum of Hungarian Agriculture, founded in 1896, opened its exhibition in the castle in 1907, before the permanent building was finished.

== Description ==
The "castle" comprises an eclectic collage of multiple landmark buildings from different parts of the Kingdom of Hungary, especially the Hunyadi Castle in Vajdahunyad (now Hunedoara, Romania), which is copied on the main facade and gave the building its name. As the castle contains parts of buildings from various time periods, it displays different architectural styles: Romanesque, Gothic, Renaissance, and Baroque; the wing that houses the museum is in the Austrian Baroque style. The portal of the Ják Chapel in the complex was modelled on the church at Ják, and its floor plan on the church at Lébény. It is sited within Budapest City Park.

The statue by Miklós Ligeti of Anonymus, the unknown chronicler at the court of King Béla III (r 1172–96), known as Anonymous, is in the courtyard of the castle.

The external wall of the castle contains a bust of Béla Lugosi, a Hungarian-American actor famous for portraying Count Dracula in the original 1931 film of the same name.

As of 2015 the castle houses the Museum of Hungarian Agriculture, the biggest agricultural museum in Europe.

== Gallery ==
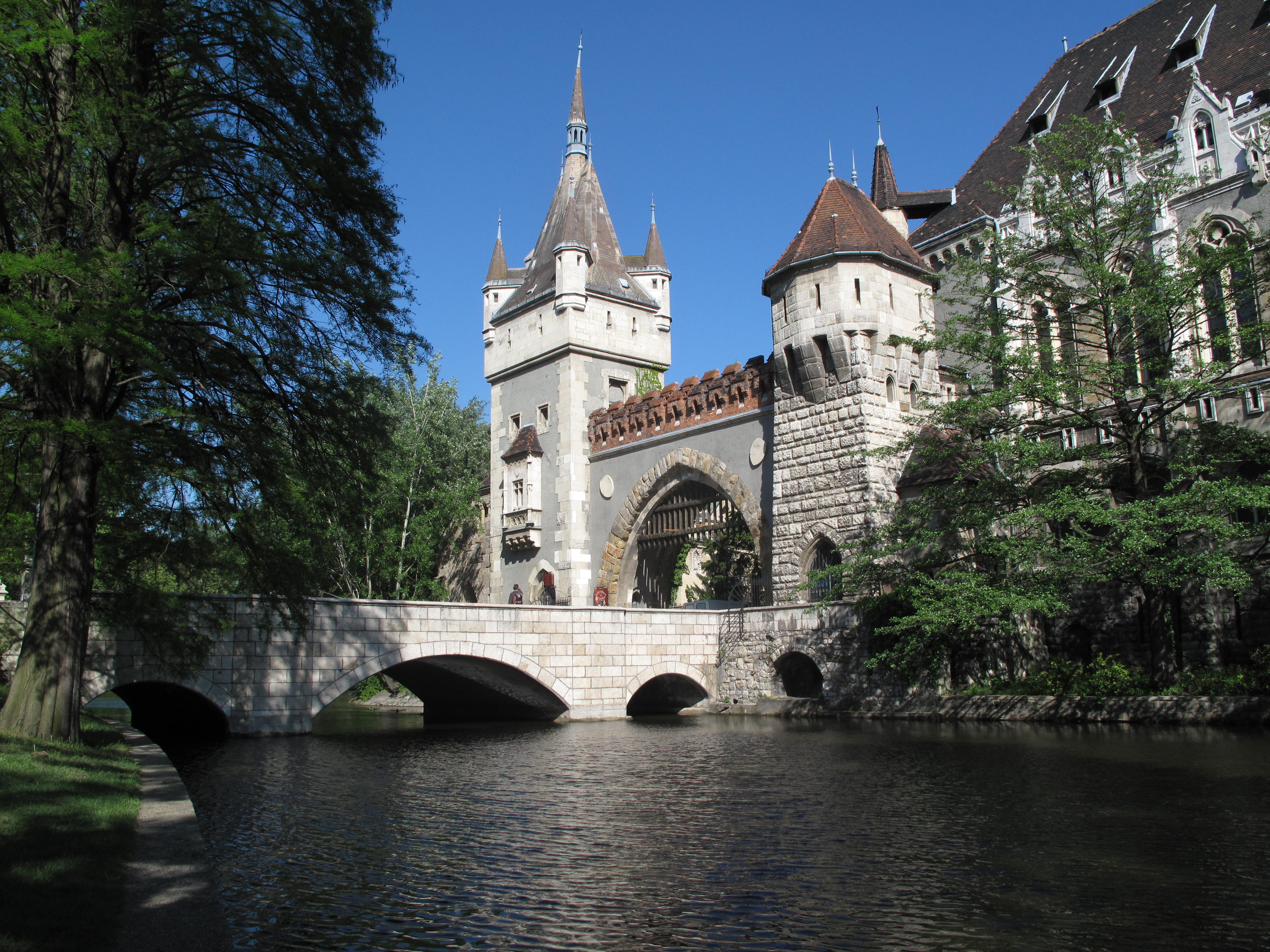

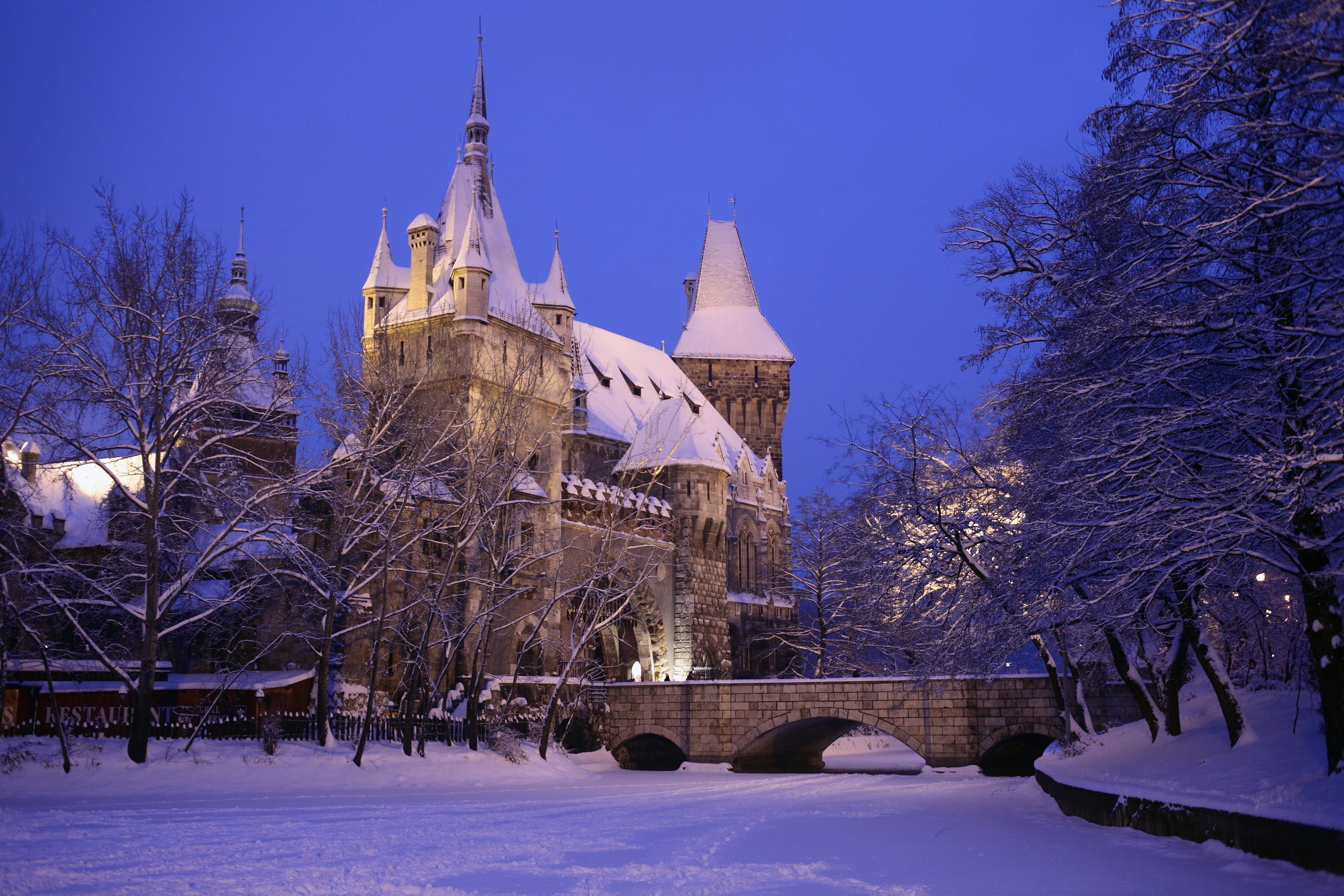

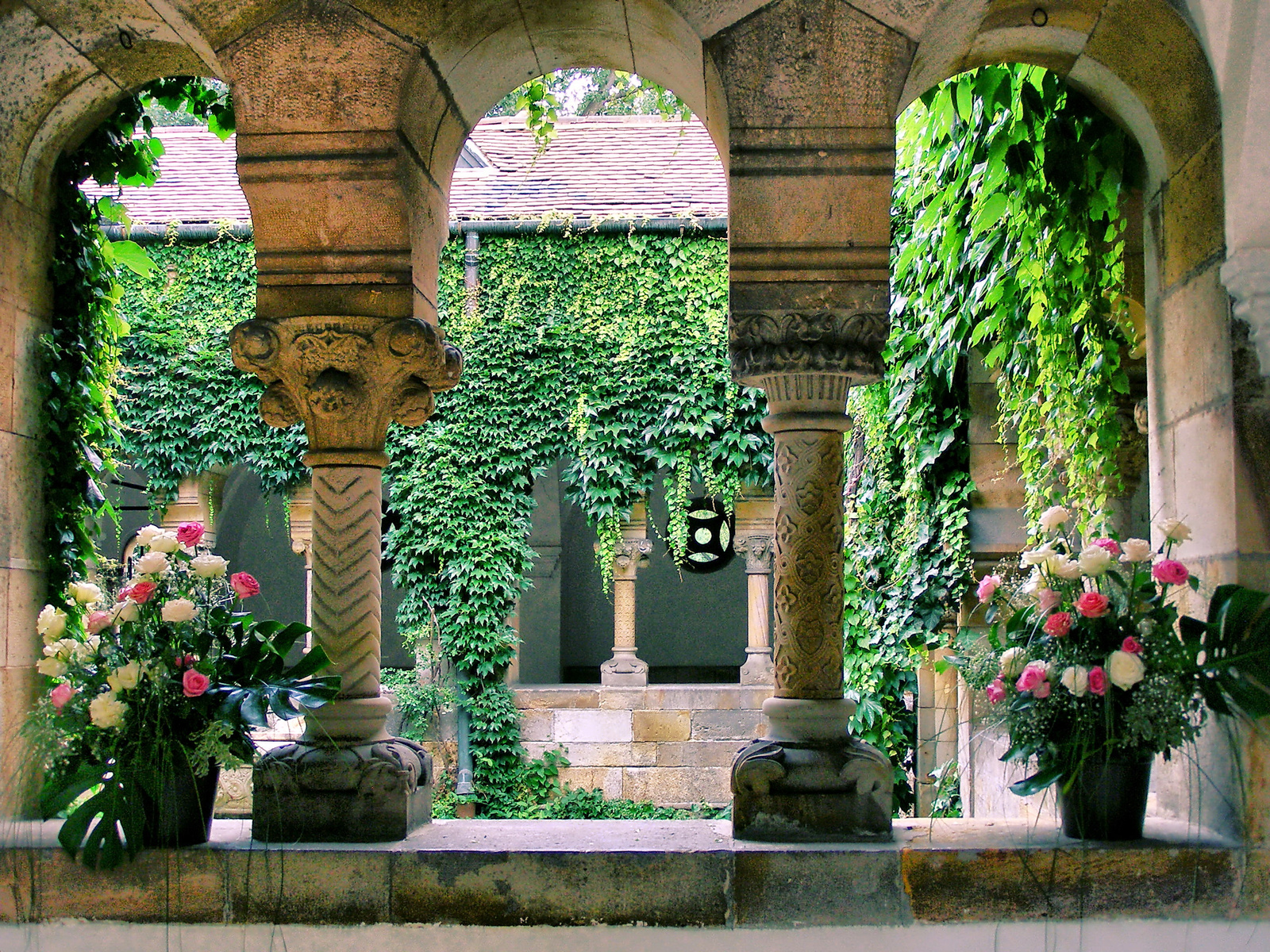

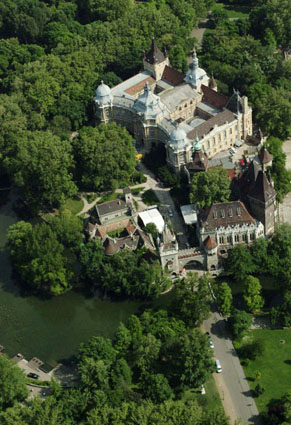

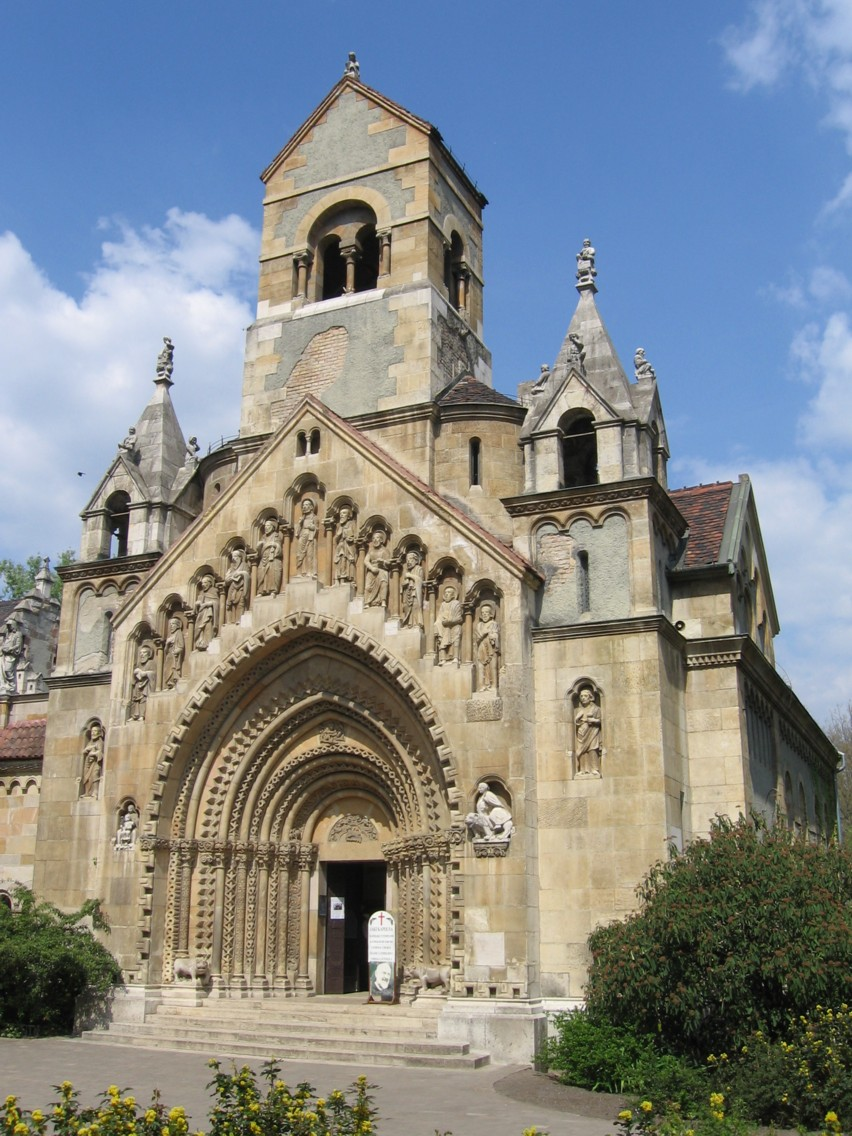

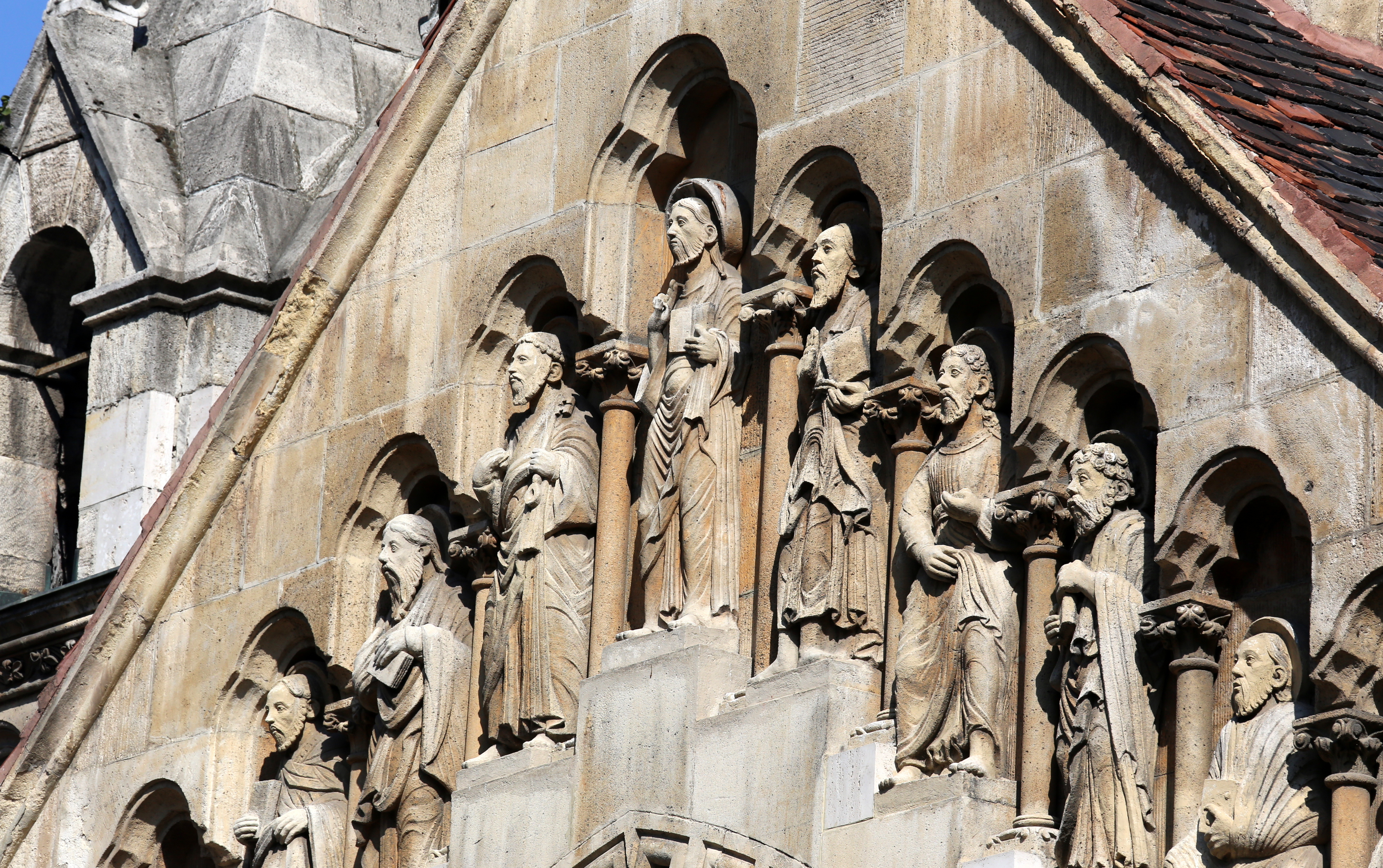

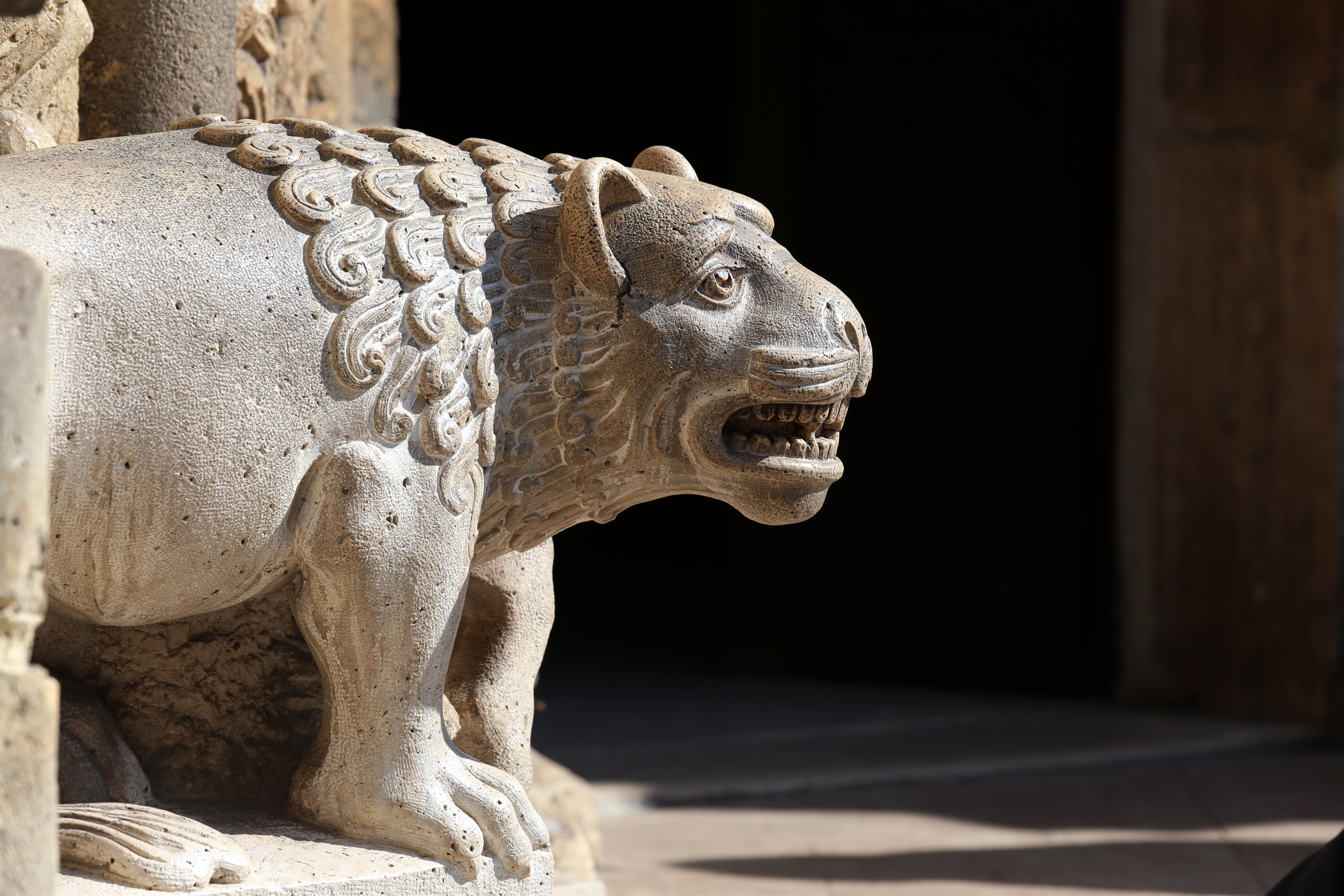
