= Spas in Budapest =

Thermal baths and springs in Budapest

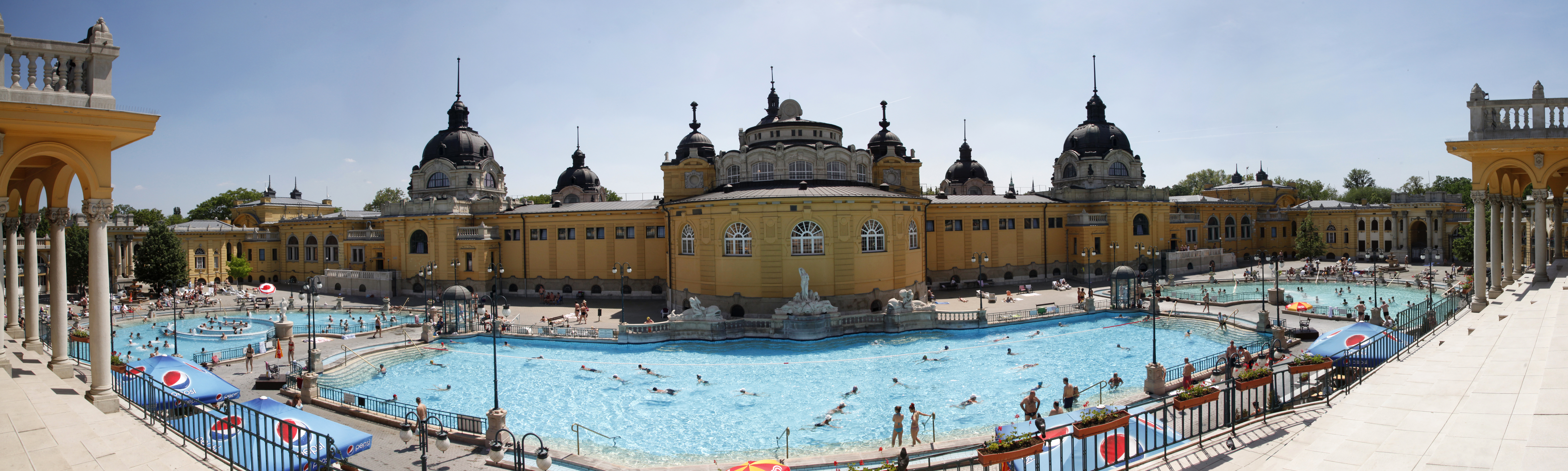
Panorama of the Széchenyi thermal baths

Thermal baths or spas in Budapest are popular tourist attractions as well as public comforts for the city's residents.

One of the reasons the Romans first colonized the area immediately to the west of the River Danube and established their regional capital at Aquincum (now part of Óbuda, in northern Budapest) is so that they could utilize and enjoy the thermal springs. There are still ruins visible today of the enormous baths that were built during that period. The new baths that were constructed during the Turkish period (1541–1686) served both bathing and medicinal purposes, and some of these are still in use to this day. Budapest gained its reputation as a city of spas in the 1920s, following the first realization of the economic potential of the thermal waters in drawing in visitors. Indeed, in 1934 Budapest was officially ranked as a "City of Spas". Construction of the Király Baths started in 1565, and most of the present-day building dates from the Turkish period, including most notably the fine cupola-topped pool.

The Rudas Baths are centrally placed – in the narrow strip of land between Gellért Hill and the River Danube – and also an outstanding example of architecture dating from the Turkish period. The central feature is an octagonal pool over which light shines from a 10 m diameter cupola, supported by eight pillars.

The Gellért Baths and Hotel were built in 1918, although there had once been a hammam on the site, and in the Middle Ages a hospital. In 1927 the Baths were extended to include the wave pool, and the effervescent bath was added in 1934. The well-preserved Art Nouveau interior includes colourful mosaics, marble columns, stained glass windows and statues.

The Lukács Baths are also in Buda and are also Turkish in origin, although they were only revived at the end of the 19th century. This was also when the spa and treatment centre were founded. All around the inner courtyard there are marble tablets recalling the thanks of patrons who were cured there. Since the 1950s it has been regarded as a centre for intellectuals and artists.

The Széchenyi Baths are one of the largest bathing complexes in all Europe, and the only “old” medicinal baths to be found in the Pest side of the city. The indoor medicinal baths date from 1913 and the outdoor pools from 1927. There is an atmosphere of grandeur about the whole place with the bright, largest pools resembling aspects associated with Roman baths, the smaller bath tubs reminding one of the bathing culture of the Greeks, and the saunas and diving pools borrowed from traditions emanating in northern Europe. The three outdoor pools (one of which is a fun pool) are open all year, including winter. Indoors there are over ten separate pools, and a whole host of medical treatments is also available.

Thermal baths in Budapest
Spa name	Number of pools	Opening hours	Availability	Public transport	Facilities	Treatments and Indications
Széchenyi Baths	18	06:00 – 22:00	mixed bathing	Metro 1 Széchenyi fürdő	Swimming pool, adventure pool, sauna, steam bath, massage treatments	Components of the thermal water include sulphate, calcium, magnesium, bicarbonate and a significant amount of fluoride acid and metaboric acid. Medical indications are on degenerative joint illnesses, chronic and sub-acute joint inflammations, as well as orthopaedic and traumatological post-treatments. Massage treatments: Refreshing Massage, Luxury Manager Massage, Deluxe Massage, Harmony Massage
Rudas Baths	7	Swimming pool: Mon-Wed: 06:00 – 18:00 Thu-Sun: 06:00 – 20:00 Fri, Sat: 22:00 – 04:00 Vapor-bath every day: 06:00 – 20:00 Friday, Saturday: 22:00 – 04:00	For women: Tuesday For men: Monday, Wednesday, Thursday, Friday, Group use: Sunday, Saturday	Tram 19, 41, 56, 56A, bus 7 Rudas Gyógyfürdő	The bath has six therapy pools and one swimming pool where the temperature is in between 16-42C. The components of slightly radioactive thermal water includes sulphate, calcium, magnesium, bicarbonate and a significant amount of fluoride ion.	Medical indications of the water are degenerative joint illnesses, chronic and sub-acute joint inflammations, vertebral disk problems, neuralgia and lack of calcium in the bone system.
Lukács Baths	5	06:00 – 20:00	mixed bathing	Tram 17, 19, 41 Szent Lukács Gyógyfürdő; Tram 4-6 Margit híd, budai hídfő	Lukács has four thermal baths, ranging in temperatures from the 26 °C (79 °F) cooling bath to the 40 °C (104 °F) hot bath. The hot spring water is rich in calcium hyrodgencarbonate, Calcium hydrogensulfite, and magnesium hydrogencarbonate and magnesium hydrogensulphate; chloride; and also contain sodium and a substantial content of fluoride ions. Facilities also include three outdoor swimming pools[3]: Men's pool (368 sq. m; 22 °C (72 °F)) Women's pool (310 sq. m; 26 °C (79 °F)) Fancy pool (220 sq. m; 32 to 33 °C (90 to 91 °F)) A steam room, as well as warm and hot saunas are also available to guests.	The therapeutic spring water of the Lukács Baths is possibly the best known of all the Budapest spas. The spring water is recommended for the treatment of gastrointestinal ailments, such as hyperacidicity, gallbladder problems. The water of the Lukács Bath is also indicated in the treatment of nephritis and kidney stones. It is also helpful in treating degenerative joint illnesses, chronic and sub-acute joint inflammations, vertebral disk problems, neuralgia and lack of calcium in the bone system.
Gellért Baths	13	06:00 - 20:00	Mon - Sat: thermal bath separate for men and women, mixed swimming pool Sunday: mixed thermal bath and swimming pool	Tram 19, 41, 47, 48, 49, 56, 56A, bus 7, 133E, Metro 4 Szent Gellért tér	The complex also includes saunas and plunge pools (segregated by gender), an open-air swimming pool which can create artificial waves every 30 minutes and an effervescent swimming pool. A Finnish sauna with cold pool and children's pool is also enclosed within the complex. Masseuse services are available.	The Gellért Baths complex includes thermal baths, which are small pools containing water from Gellért hill's mineral hot springs. The water contains calcium, magnesium, hydrocarbonate, alkalis, chloride, sulfate and fluoride. Medical indications of the water includes degenerative joint illnesses, spine problems, chronic and sub-acute joint inflammations, vertebral disk problems, neuralgia, vasoconstriction and circulatory disturbances; inhalation problems for the treatment of asthma and chronic bronchitis problems.
Király Baths	4	09:00 - 21:00	mixed bathing	Tram 19, 41, bus 109 Bem József tér Metro 2 Batthyány tér	The Király Bath includes a thermal pool, massage treatments, sauna and steam room, a Finnish sauna for two people with a cold pool, a store selling medical aids and a snack bar for guests.	Medical indications of the water are degenerative joint illnesses, chronic and sub-acute joint inflammations, vertebral disk problems, neuralgia and lack of calcium in the bone system.

== Gallery ==
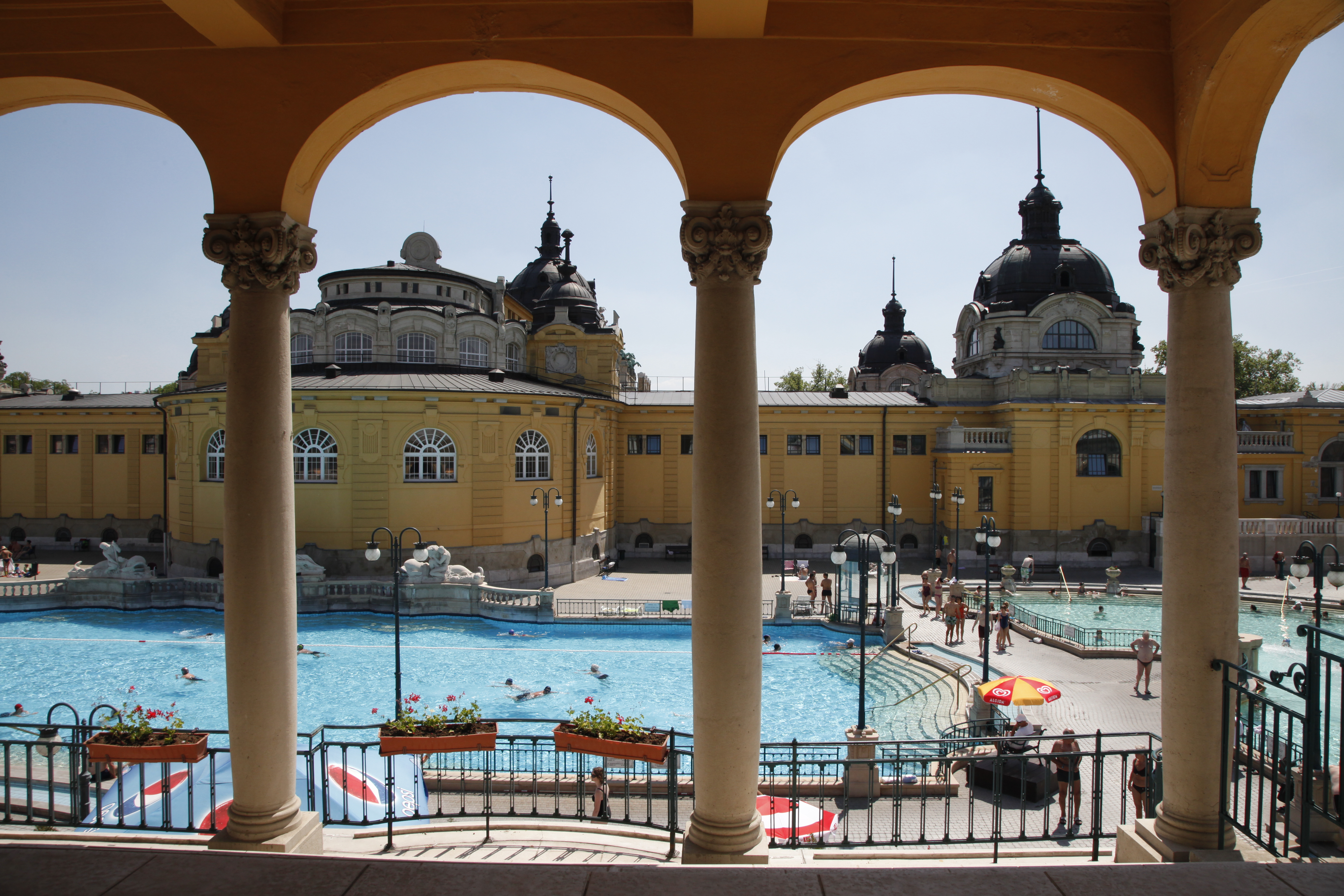

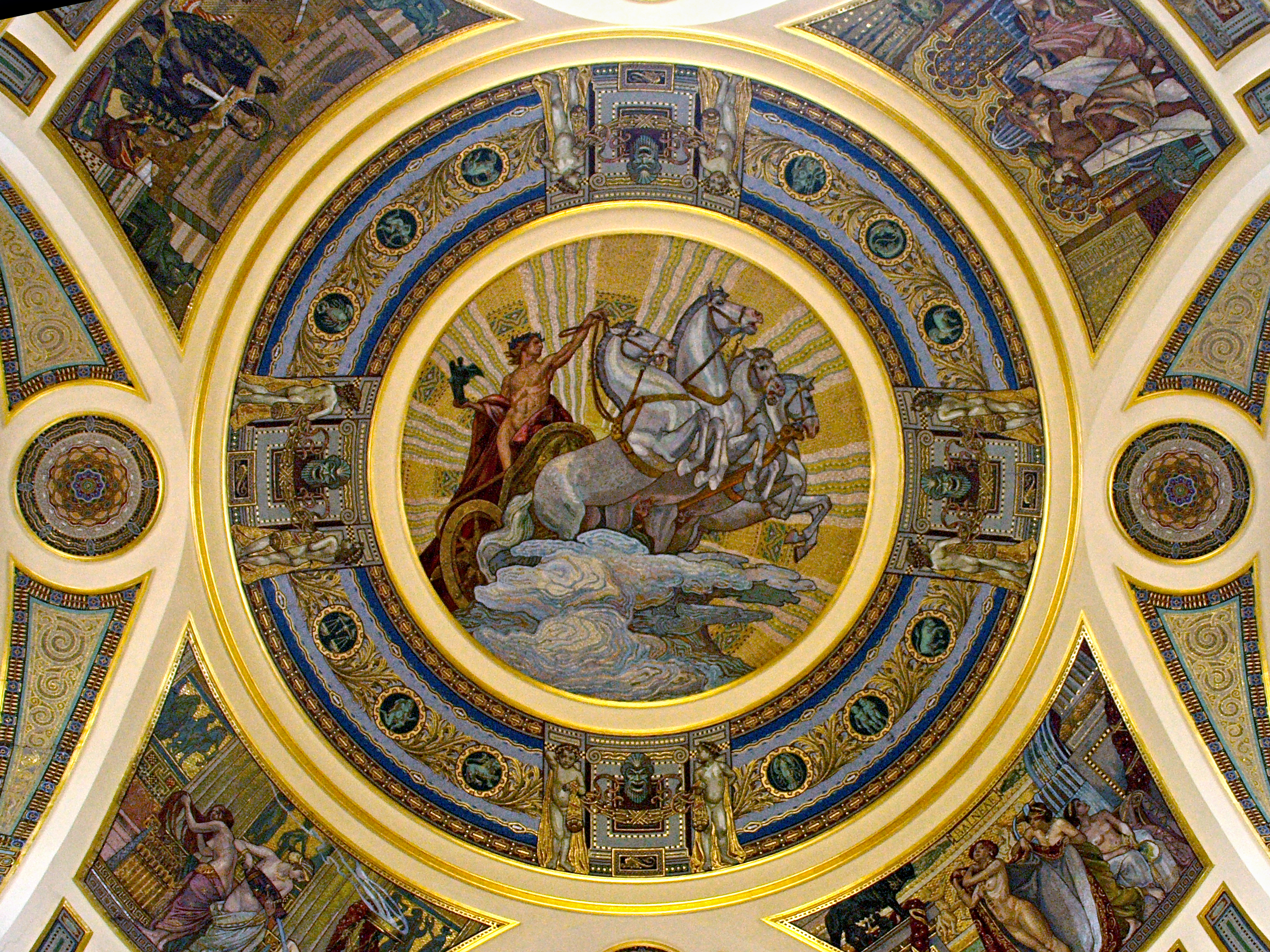

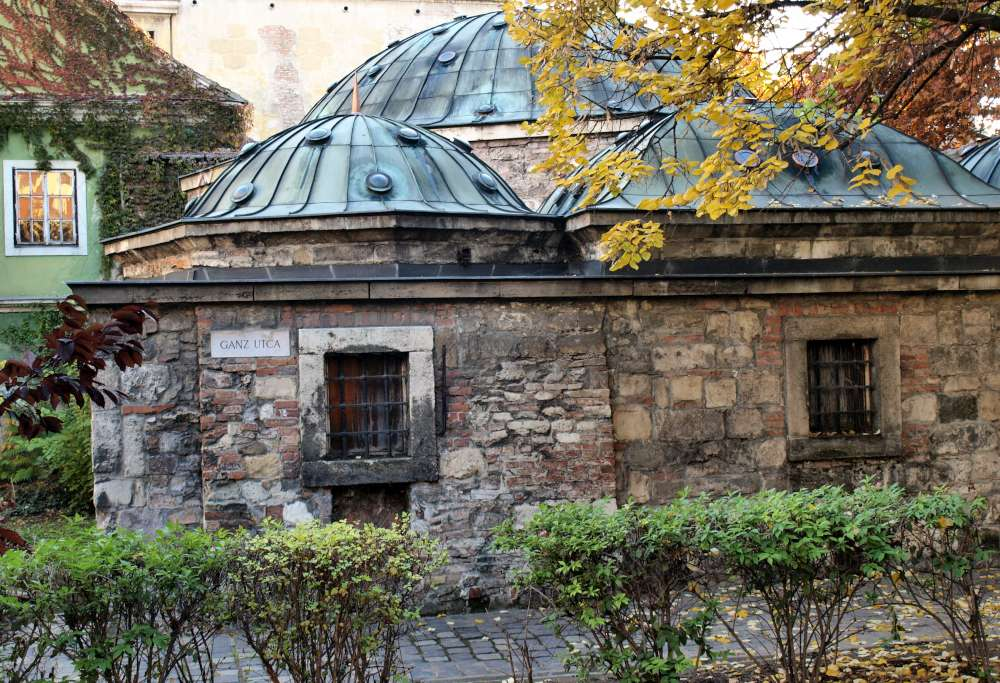

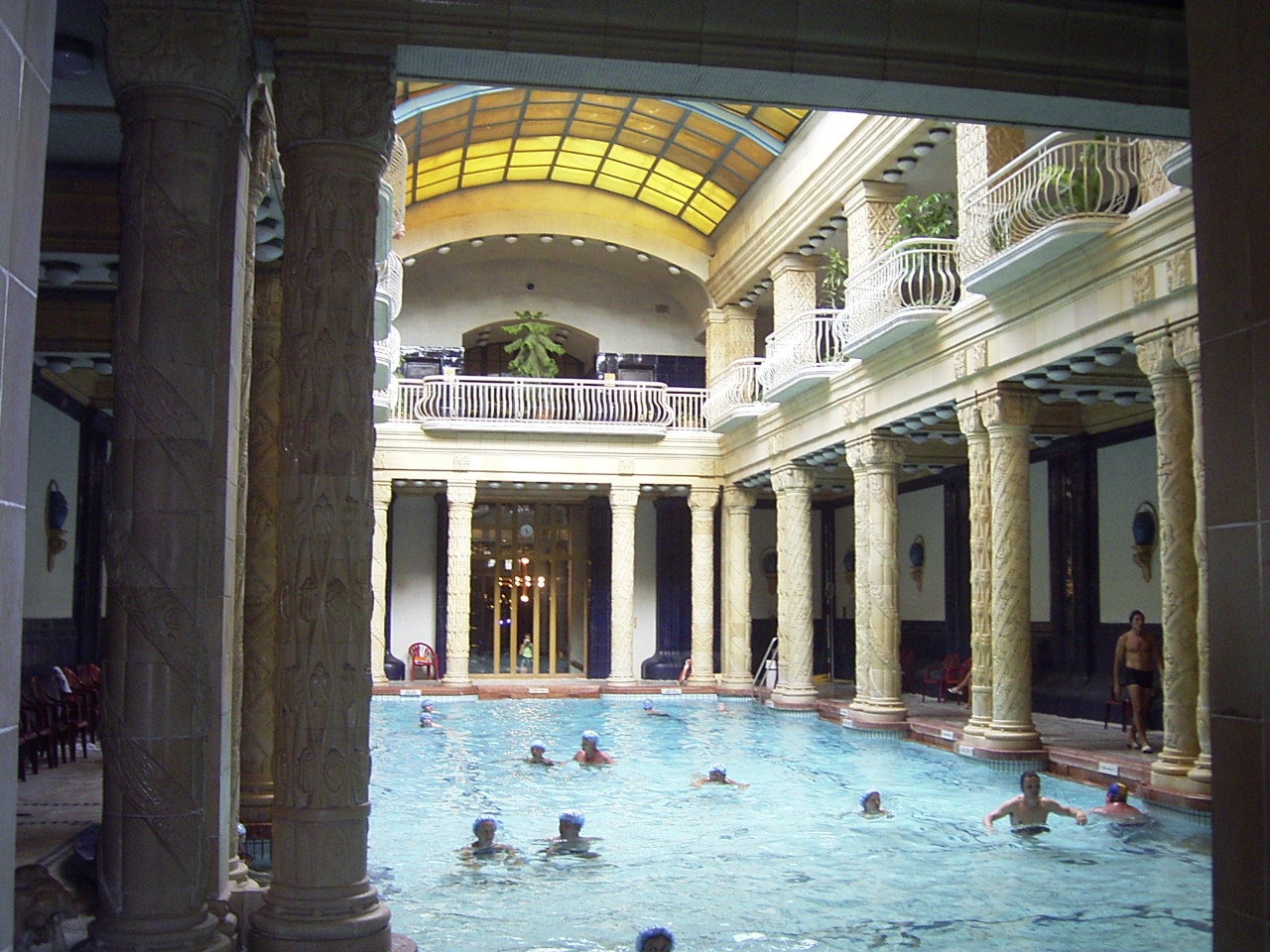
