= Lukač =

Lukačis a Slavic surname. Notable people with the surname include:

- Milan Lukač (born 1985), Serbian footballer
- Nermina Lukac (born 1990), Swedish actress
- Patrik Lukáč (born 1994), Slovak footballer
- Rudolf Lukáč (born 1969), Slovak weightlifter
- Vincent Lukáč (born 1954), Slovak ice hockey player and coach

== See also ==
- Lukács, Hungarian rendering of the surname
