= Cinetrip and sparties =

Cinetrip and the sparties are bath parties in Budapest Cinetrip is a brand which has been organizing bath parties in several famous thermal baths of Budapest, Hungary. The first events were held in 1998, with silent films serving as visual backgrounds for the live electronic music.

The technology and the visuals have been always changing with time, and Cinetrip is becoming more and more popular - with a full house of young tourists visiting Budapest.

Originally these parties were organized in Rudas Bath, which is a famous thermal bath at the bank of the Danube. In 2010 they were moved to Lukács Bath and Széchenyi Bath, two emblematic Monarchical baths of the turn of the 20th century. The semiannual big Cinetrips (like Water Circus, and recently Future Disco) were complemented with the weekly sparties (spa + art + party): Magic Bath in Lukács Bath for the winter season, and Szecska in Széchenyi Bath for the summer season.

The speciality of all Cinetrip parties is that there is no other pool party in the world, it's a speciality to have a party with VJ-s, LED-s, DJ music in thermal water. If someone would like to visit one of them, it's worth to book the tickets in advance online, because it can occur that there doesn't remain any on the spot.
