= Sparty Budapest =

- Locations: Budapest, Hungary
- Years active: 1994–present
- Founders: György Klinkó, László L.Laki
- Website: spartybooking.com

Sparty is a Hungarian event series which has been held since 1994 in Budapest's oldest thermal baths. Its name, a registered trademark in the European Union, is a portmanteau of the words "spa" and "party," indicating the fusion of night bathing with club life.

== History ==
Hungarian bath culture has a long history of hundreds of years, which was founded in the time of the ancient Roman Empire and later developed further under Turkish influence. Due to its historical traditions, Budapest is customarily described as the city of spas, which, besides satisfying domestic needs, makes the Hungarian capital popular among tourists. Sparty built an event on these traditions of thermal baths, where the night bathing is complemented with light and laser shows and live music.

== Popularity ==
Sparty events attract approximately 50,000 visitors annually. Originating as nighttime bath parties, these gatherings combine thermal bathing with electronic music performances, featuring genres such as electro, trip-hop, hip-hop, funk, and trance, alongside the service of alcoholic beverages, contributing to their high popularity among tourists and young adults.
