= Lukács =

Lukács (Hungarian: [ˈlukaːt͡ʃ]) is a Hungarian surname, derived from the given name Lukács, which is the Hungarian equivalent of Lucas. Alternative spellings and derivative forms in neighboring languages include Lukacs, Lukáč, Lukač, Lukach, Lucaci, and Lukačić. Slovakised variant of this surname, Lukáč is the 10th most common surname in Slovakia. The surname may refer to:

- Ádám Lukács (born 1996), Hungarian ice dancer
- Ágnes Lukács (1920–2016), Hungarian-Jewish painter
- Amela Lukač Zoranić (born 1979), Bosniak-Serbian academic and politician
- Attila Richard Lukacs (born 1962), Canadian artist
- Chuck Lukacs, American artist
- Dániel Lukács (born 1996), Hungarian footballer
- Dénes Lukács (colonel) (1816–1868), Hungarian colonel
- Dénes Lukács (tennis) (born 1987), Hungarian tennis player
- Eugene Lukacs (1906–1987), American statistician
- Gábor Lukács, Hungarian politician
- György Lukács (1885–1971), Hungarian philosopher
- György Lukács (politician) (1865–1950), Hungarian politician
- István Lukács (1912–1960), Hungarian footballer
- Ivan Lukačić (1587–1648), Croatian musician
- John Lukacs (1924–2019), American historian
- John R. Lukacs (born 1947), American anthropologist
- László Lukács (1850–1932), Hungarian politician and prime minister
- László György Lukács (born 1983), Hungarian lawyer and politician
- Margit Lukács (1914–2002), Hungarian actress
- Mária Bajzek Lukács (born 1960), Hungarian writer and university professor
- Mihály Lukács (1954–2012), Hungarian Romani politician
- Milan Lukač (born 1985), Serbian footballer
- Nermina Lukac (born 1990), Montenegrin-Swedish actress
- Pál Lukács (1919–1981), Hungarian violist
- Patrik Lukáč (born 1994), Slovak footballer
- Paul Lukas (1891–1971), American actor
- Paul Lukacs (1918–1982), Hungarian-Israeli bridge player
- Péter Lukács (born 1950), Hungarian chess grandmaster
- Péter Lukács (born 2002), Hungarian handball player
- Raymond Lukács (born 1988), Romanian footballer
- Rudolf Lukáč (born 1969), Slovak weightlifter
- Symeon Lukach (1893–1964), Ukrainian bishop
- Tamás Lukács (born 1950), Hungarian politician
- Tihamér Lukács (born 1980), Hungarian footballer
- Vanda Lukács (born 1992), Hungarian tennis player
- Vasile Lucaci (1852-1922), Romanian priest and activist
- Viktória Lukács (born 1995), Hungarian handballer
- Vincent Lukáč (born 1954), Slovak ice hockey player and coach
- Zoltán Lukács (born 1969), Hungarian politician

== See also ==
- Lucas
- Lukač
- Lukas
