= Burkhard Schittny =

German visual artist

- Citizenship: German
- Education: University of the Arts Bremen; Central Saint Martins, University of the Arts London
- Occupation: Visual artist
- Website: schittny.de

Burkhard Schittny is a German visual artist.

== Background ==
=== Education ===
Schittny initially studied fashion design at the University of the Arts Bremen, before shifting his focus to photography, graduating in 1997 with a photographic work inspired by Francis Bacon. He completed a Master’s degree in Fine Art at Central Saint Martins College of Art and Design in London, graduating with two video performances.

=== Career ===
Schittny’s work spans photography, video, installation, and sculptural objects, combining conceptual, experimental, and cross-disciplinary approaches.

His long-term Legacy Projects address themes of memory, war, displacement, and family history, frequently drawing on his parents’ experiences during and after the Second World War and combining documentary material with staged and conceptual elements.

Dignity – Tribute to Ágnes Lukács is a 60-minute video installation by Schittny, that adapts motifs from the work of Hungarian artist Ágnes Lukács and explores themes of solidarity and survival. The work was included in the international exhibition Missing Stories, initiated by the Goethe‑Institut.

He developed the wall-object series Tubes. The non-representational works reference avant-garde geometric abstraction, post-war modernism, and Op Art, and employ reflective and transparent materials arranged in rational geometric structures. The pieces use simple geometric forms while creating visual effects that produce a sense of illusionism, which changes with viewing angle and lighting.

His work has appeared in The New York Times Magazine, New York Magazine, and Wired.

== Selected exhibitions ==
- 2025: Dutch Design Week at Piet Hein Eek, Eindhoven, NL
- 2025: Shaping Space, ArtNow Gallery, Berlin, DE
- 2024: Disclosure, Dutch Design Week with Isola Design, Eindhoven, NL
- 2023: Art Karlsruhe, ATM Gallery, Karlsruhe, DE
- 2023: Angst, Künstlerverein Walkmühle, Wiesbaden, DE
- 2022: Wiesbadener Fototage, Aktives Museum Spiegelgasse, Wiesbaden, DE
- 2021: MISSING STORIES, National Historical Museum, Tirana, AL
- 2019: 100 Jahre DFA, Deichtorhallen, Hamburg, DE
- 2016: Untitled, Atelier Schwab, Wertheim, DE
- 2002: Island, Aplanat Galerie, DE

== Awards ==
- 1999: Reinhart Wolf Preis 99, Award
- 2010: London Photographic Association, Urbanscape, Bronze Winner
