= Király Baths =

Historic thermal bath in Hungary

Coordinates: 47°30′38.51″N 19°2′17.16″E

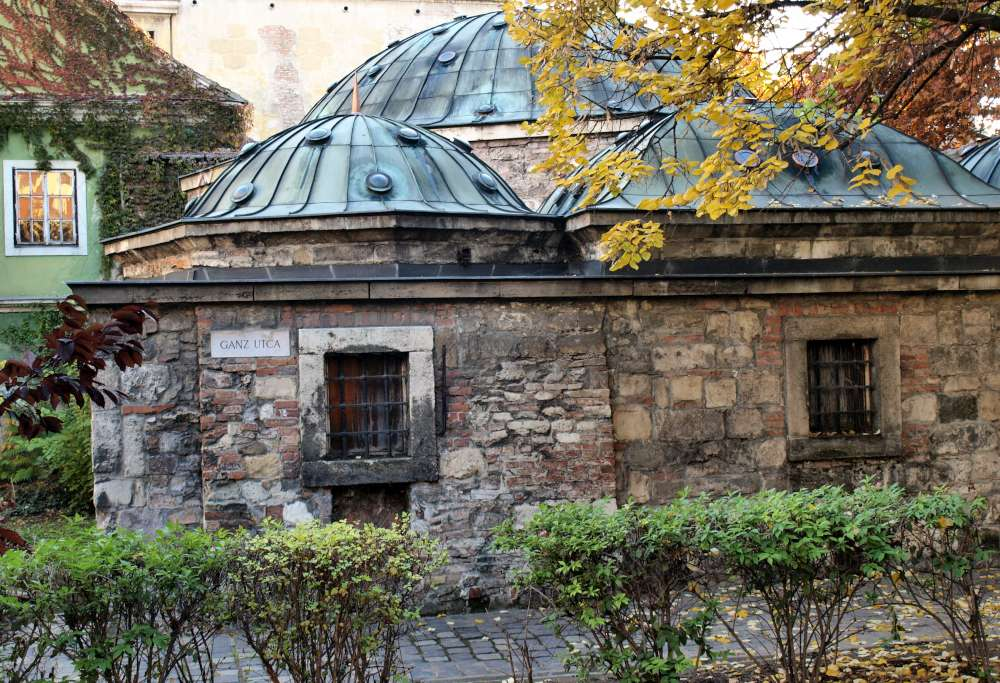
Király Baths building at Ganz Street

Király Bath or Király fürdő (Hungarian pronunciation: [ˈkiraːj ˈfyrdøː]) is a historic thermal bath in Budapest, Hungary, built in the 1560s and 1570s, during the time of Ottoman rule. Work on it was probably begun by Arslan, the pasha of Buda, in 1565 and completed by his successor, Sokollu Mustafa Pasha, who was the longest-serving governor general (1566-1578) of the Ottoman province of Budin and who built similar baths at Rudas, Rác and Veli bej, which also survive in Budapest. The bath and its neighborhood later became part of the consolidated city of Budapest.

The bath receives its water from springs located near the Lukács Baths and Császár baths, which the Turks led into the city via underground pipes.

At the end of the 18th century the bath passed to the König family: Ferenc König bought it in 1796, and after his death Mihály König bought it from his widow and had the Viennese architect Mathias Schmidt remodel the Baroque wing and add a classicist section, probably between 1827 and 1837. Locals began to call it Königsbad, or Király (King) Bath, after the family.

It retained many of the key elements of a hammam, exemplified by its Turkish dome and octagonal pool. It is located at the corner of Fő utca and Ganz utca. Its address and entrance was Fő utca 82-84 while the exterior of the bath proper is on Ganz utca (domed stone structure).

Components of thermal water included sodium, calcium, magnesium bicarbonate, sulphate-chloride and a significant amount of fluoride ion. The water temperature in the four different pools varied between 26 and 40 °C.

The Király Baths have been closed since 15 March 2020. The bath was last completely renovated in the 1950s, in work begun in 1955 to plans by the architect Egon Pfannl. A 2017 design competition for its reconstruction and extension was won by the 3h architectural office, but the project was later halted. In 2024 the office prepared new, smaller concept plans centred on the Ottoman-era bath, whose domes would be uncovered and tiled with Turkish tiles, with a wellness area, a beauty salon and a restaurant added; the schedule and financing were still under negotiation.
