= Ágnes Lukács =

Hungarian painter (1920–2016)

Ágnes Lukács (11 November 1920 – 12 September 2016) was a Hungarian-Jewish painter, graphic artist and secondary school teacher. She was the daughter of the painter Gyula Lukács.

== Life ==
Ágnes Lukács was born in Budapest. Her artistic talent was noticed early on and she was considered a child prodigy because of her drawings. She was five years old when her drawings were first exhibited. During her youth several of her drawings appeared in various daily and weekly newspapers.

From 1939 to 1944 she studied fine arts and art education at the Budapest Academy of Arts under Gyula Kandó and István Szönyi. She graduated as an art teacher. In July 1944 she was deported to Auschwitz-Birkenau. Because of her knowledge of German, Lukács was able to work in a writing detachment where she had to keep lists of the prisoner population. Occasionally she made drawings for functionary prisoners and SS members for an extra slice of bread. From December 1944 onwards, she was transferred to various subcamps of the concentration camps Groß-Rosen and Neuengamme and finally liberated by US troops in Salzwedel in April 1945. She returned to Budapest in July 1945, where she met her parents, who had survived the Budapest ghetto. In the hope of better political and social conditions, Lukács joined the Communist Party in 1945 and worked periodically in the teachers' union. From then on she taught art in two schools. In 1955 she went to the Endre Sagvari School, an elite grammar school of the university, where also trainee teachers were taught. In addition, she illustrated for international magazines for many years.

In 1977 Lukács retired and was able to devote herself more to painting, which she had only been able to do part-time before. She had numerous exhibitions at home and abroad. Lukács's oral history interview as a Holocaust survivor is preserved on video in the Visual History Archive of the USC Shoah Foundation. Lukács developed dementia in her later years, and died in 2016 in a Budapest nursing home.

== Artistic career ==
Lukács created many drawings, collages, graphics and paintings.

She is particularly known for works in which she processed the memories of the concentration camps. In 1946 the Socialist Zionist Party ICHUD published the album "Auschwitz Nöi Tábor" (The Auschwitz Women's Camp). Published on the first anniversary of the liberation of the Budapest Ghetto, this pictorial account of Holocaust survivor Lukács depicts the artist's own experiences in the Auschwitz Women's Camp. In the folder with twenty-four grim illustrations there is also a depiction of a closely knit group of women who embrace each other and thus seem to warm or comfort each other. Those standing outside try to get as close as possible to the others. The title "Összebújva" (Close together) underlines the statement of the drawing and refers to the representation of female solidarity against the background of radical violence.

In this cycle, Lukács makes multiple use of the motif of the group as well as the means of detail, thus condensing the visual narratives of forced labour, selection, hunger, violence and death. Her preliminary sketches, made in autumn 1945, were lost, as were the stones on which she drew. The motif "Összebújva" has accompanied Lukács throughout her life and she has reinterpreted it herself in numerous variations. The artist Burkhard Schittny was inspired by this motif in 2019 and honoured her work in his video performance 'Dignity-Tribute to Ágnes Lukács'.

In her late work, she not only addressed the horrors of the Holocaust, but also repeatedly devoted herself to landscape painting, still lifes and portraits. Her works have been exhibited both nationally and internationally. In 1994, the Jewish Museum in Droste/Westphalia presented drawings and paintings by her. An exhibition at the Jenny Marx House in Salzwedel and at the concentration camp memorial in Neuengamme followed in 1999.
