= Patrik Lukáč =

Slovak footballer

Personal information
- Date of birth: 5 December 1994 (age 31)
- Place of birth: Prešov, Slovakia
- Height: 1.91 m (6 ft 3 in)
- Position: Goalkeeper

Team information
- Current team: Zemplín Michalovce
- Number: 1

Youth career
- –2011: Tatran Prešov
- 2011: → Odeva Lipany (loan)
- 2012–2013: Teplice

Senior career*
Years	Team	Apps	(Gls)
2013–2014	Teplice	0	(0)
2014–2015	Slovan Liberec	2	(0)
2015	Senica	0	(0)
2016–2017	Železiarne Podbrezová	1	(0)
2018–2019	Tatran Prešov	39	(0)
2020	Elana Toruń	0	(0)
2020–2023	ViOn Zlaté Moravce	48	(0)
2023	Podbeskidzie	6	(0)
2024	ViOn Zlaté Moravce	6	(0)
2024–	Zemplín Michalovce	38	(0)

International career
2013	Slovakia U19	5	(0)
- * Club domestic league appearances and goals as of 25 May 2026

Patrik Lukáč (born 5 December 1994) is a Slovak professional footballer who plays as a goalkeeper for Zemplín Michalovce.

== Club career ==
=== Slovan Liberec ===
He made his professional Gambrinus Liga debut for Slovan Liberec against Vysočina Jihlava on 23 May 2015.

=== Zemplín Michalovce ===
On 17 June 2024, Lukáč signed a two-year deal with Zemplín Michalovce.
