= Lukács Baths =

Historic indoor/outdoor thermal bath spa in Budapest, Hungary

Coordinates: 47°31′4.18″N 19°2′12.2″E

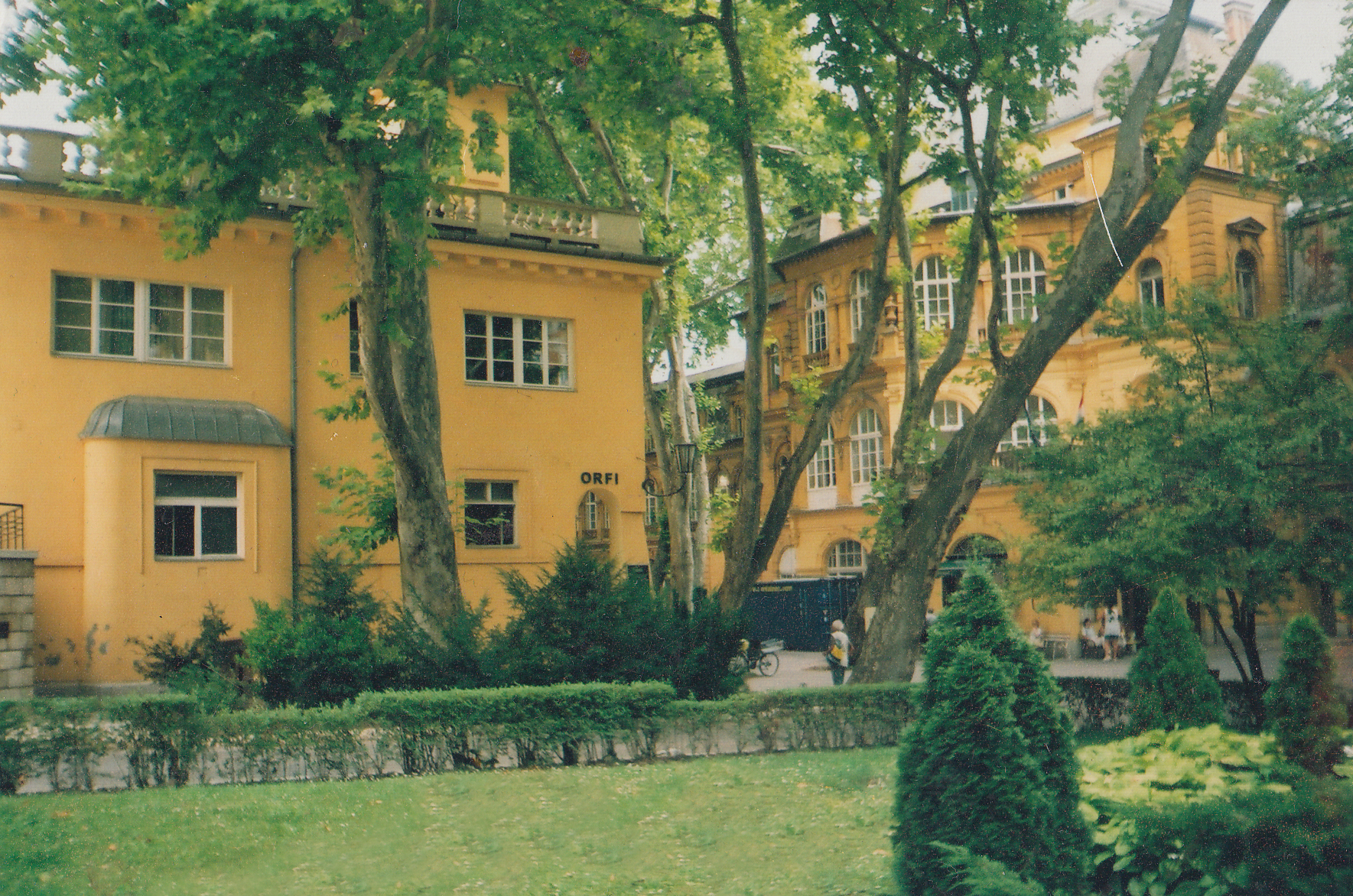
Lukács Baths

The Lukács Thermal Bath (Hungarian: Szenr Lukács gyógyfürdő) is a historic indoor/outdoor thermal bath spa in Budapest, Hungary, heated by natural hot springs. All pools and four saunas can be used by all guests except for the optional area of the sauna world, which contains five more saunas, ice cooling pool, igloo and heated roman bench.

== History ==
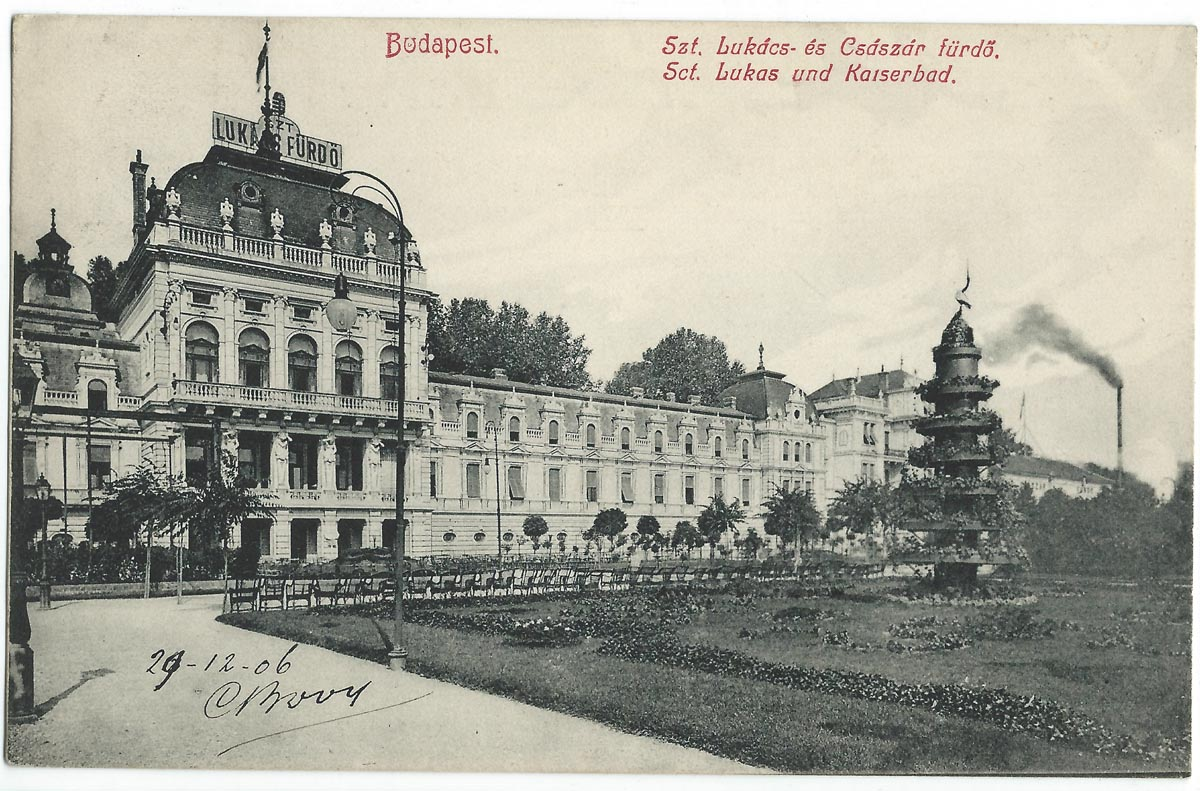
Lukács Baths

Thermal baths have been used at this location since at least the 12th century (by the Knights Hospitallers), and as part of the interior there is a wall that is a remainder of a former Ottoman powder mill (the Császár mill) which used the hot spring water as a source of power.

The first spa hotel was completed in the 1880s, and named for Saint Luke. This spa was expanded with a drinking-water hall constructed in 1937, and in 1979 a health clinic was added.

The Császár Thermal Bath is the oldest continually operating thermal bath in Budapest, and was originally built by Szokoli Mustafa. It was redesigned in 1844 by József Hild, and is now part of the National Institute of Rheumatology and Physiotherapy.

== Facilities ==
=== Thermal section ===
- Three thermal pools, with temperatures of 32 °C (90 °F), 36 °C (97 °F) and 40 °C (104 °F) temperatures, and a cooling pool with 24 °C (75 °F)
- A dry sauna and a steam room
- Massage
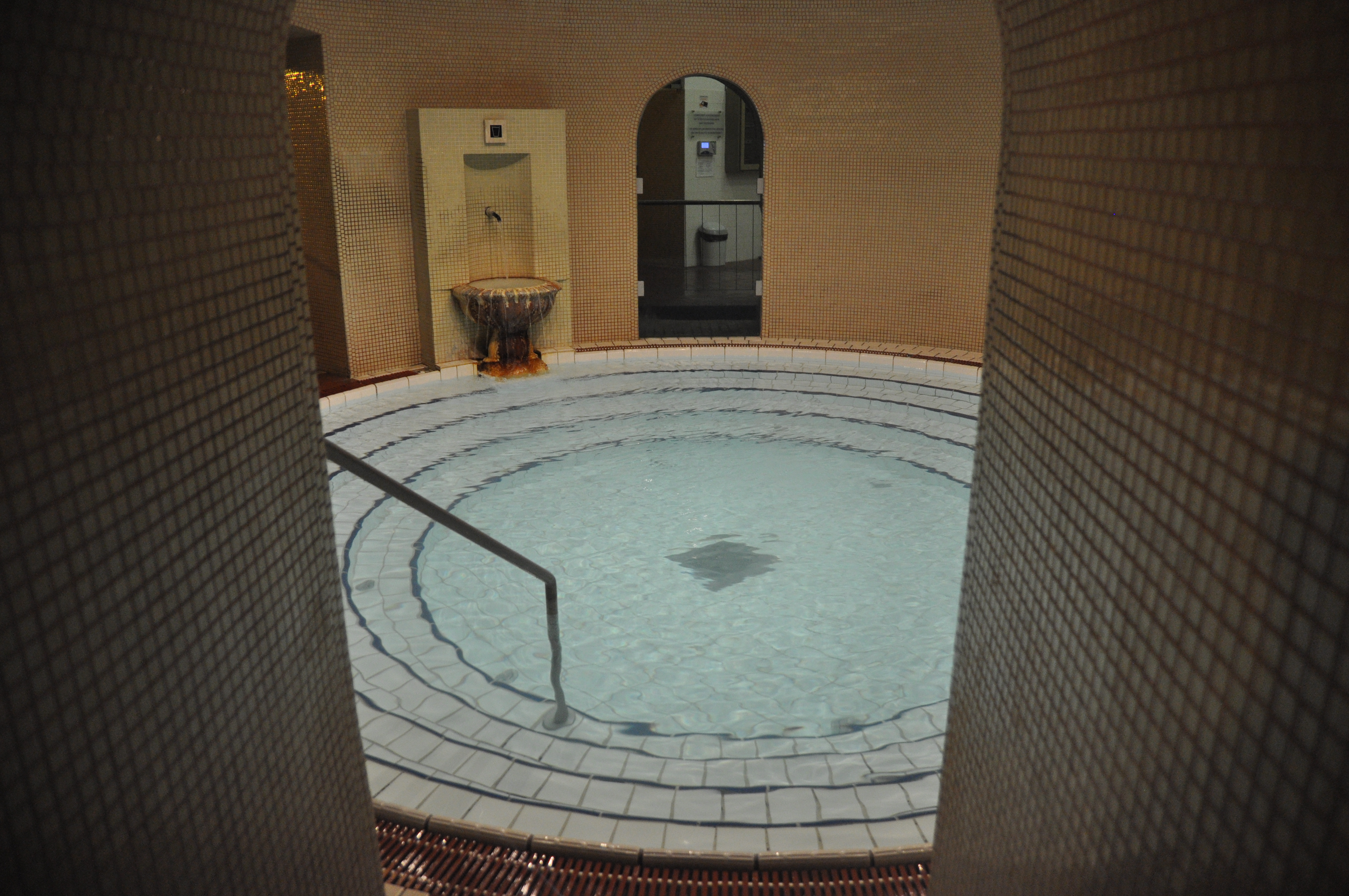
40 °C

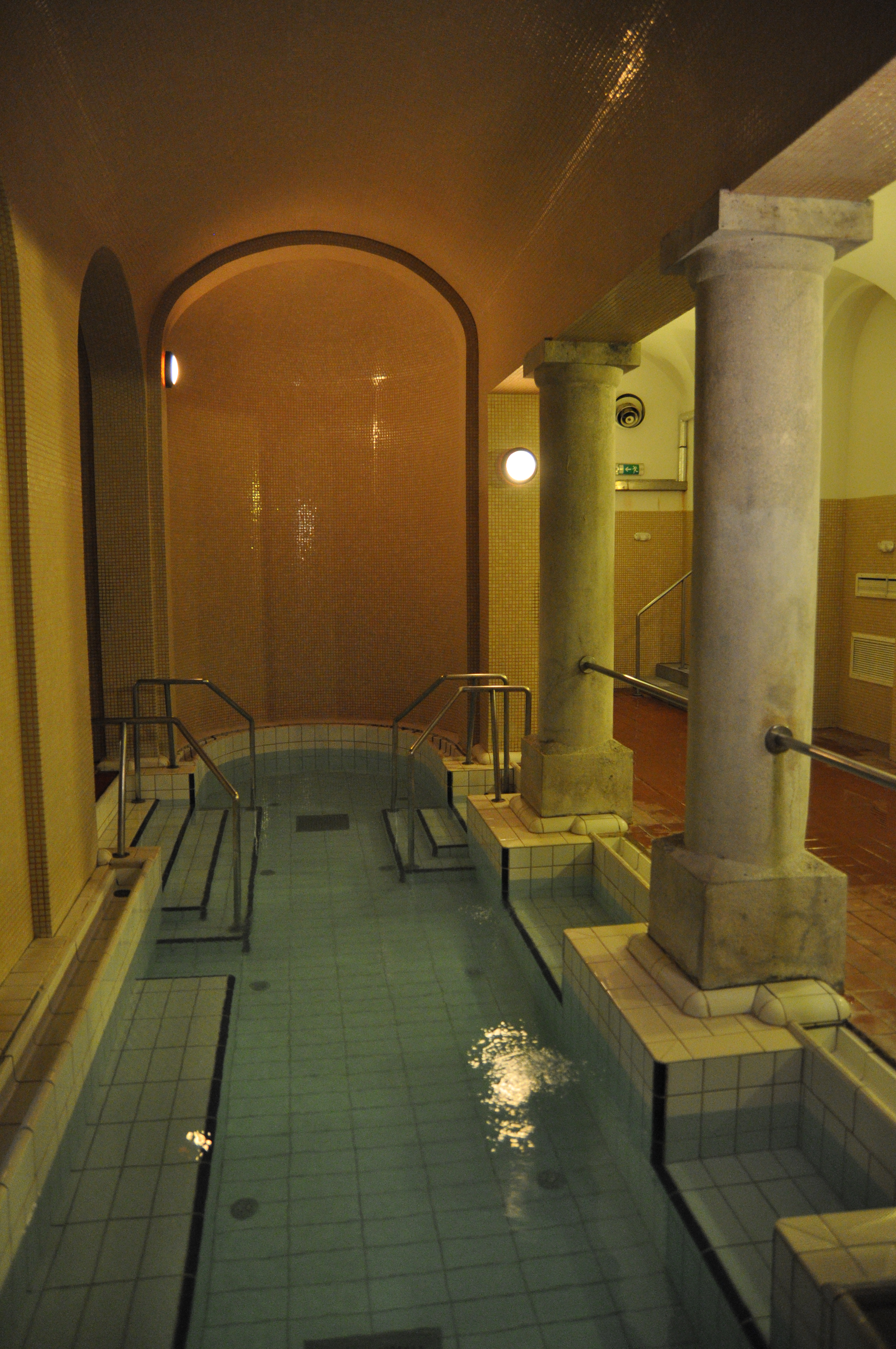
36 °C

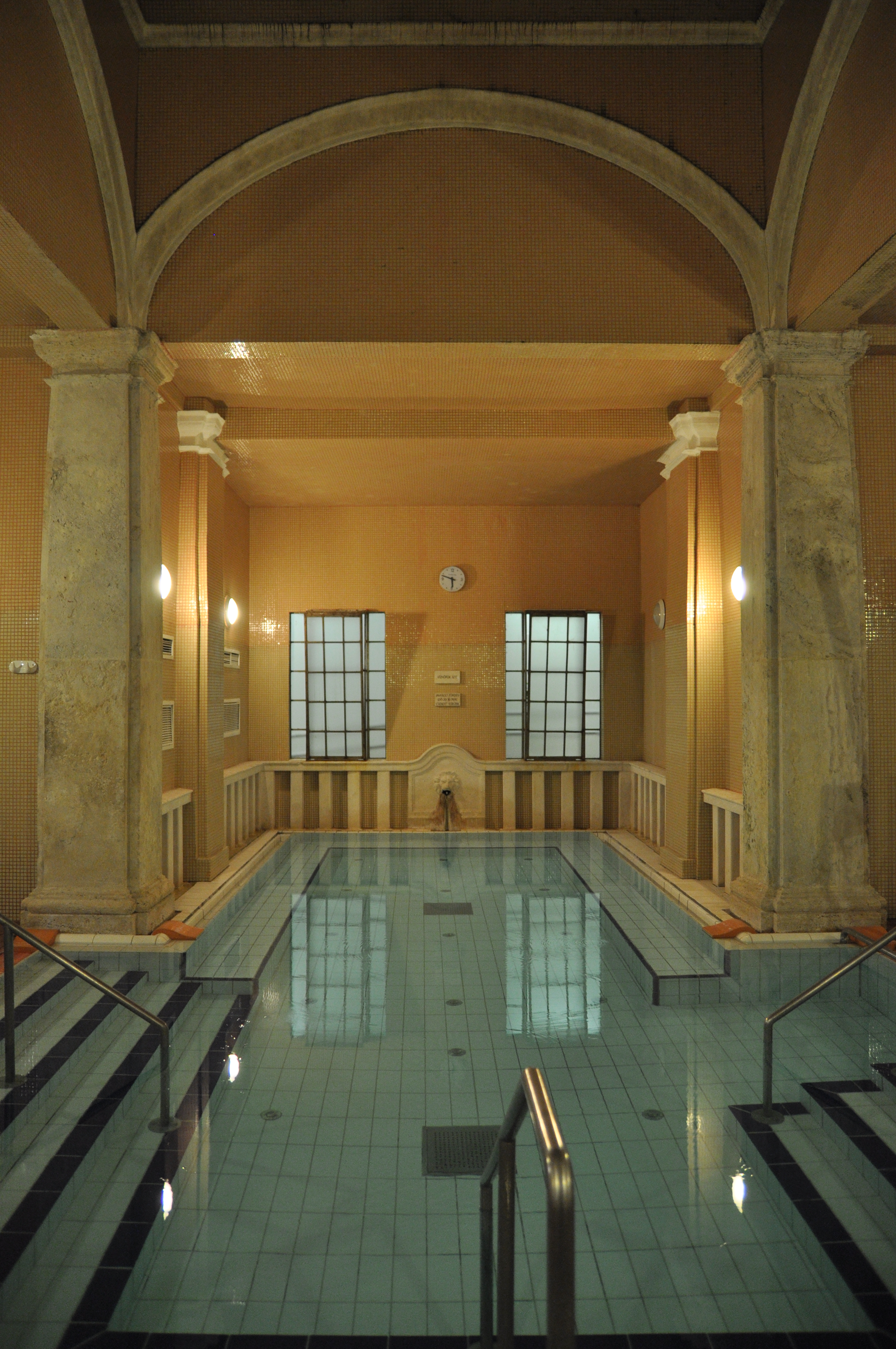
32 °C

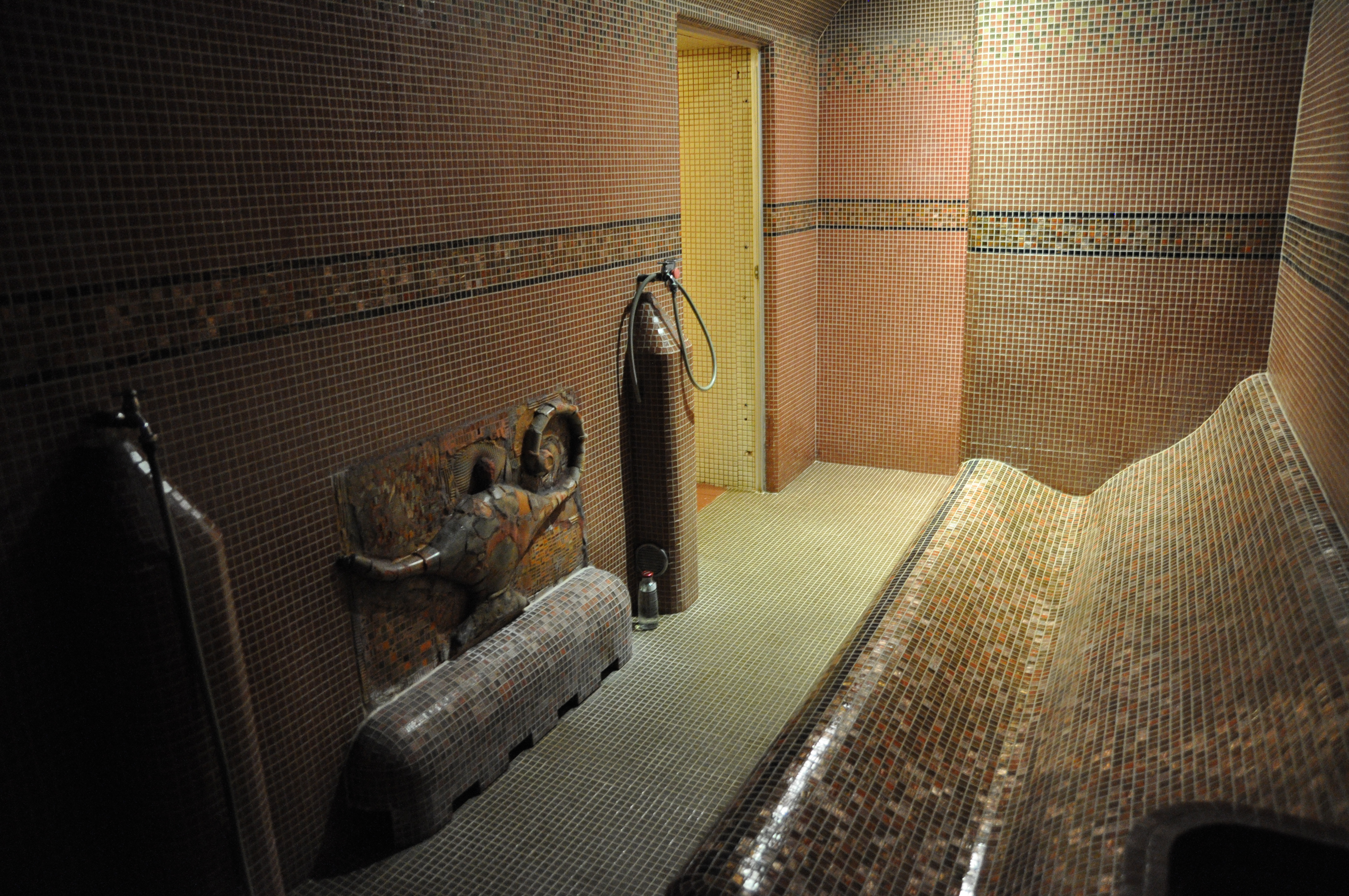
Steam room

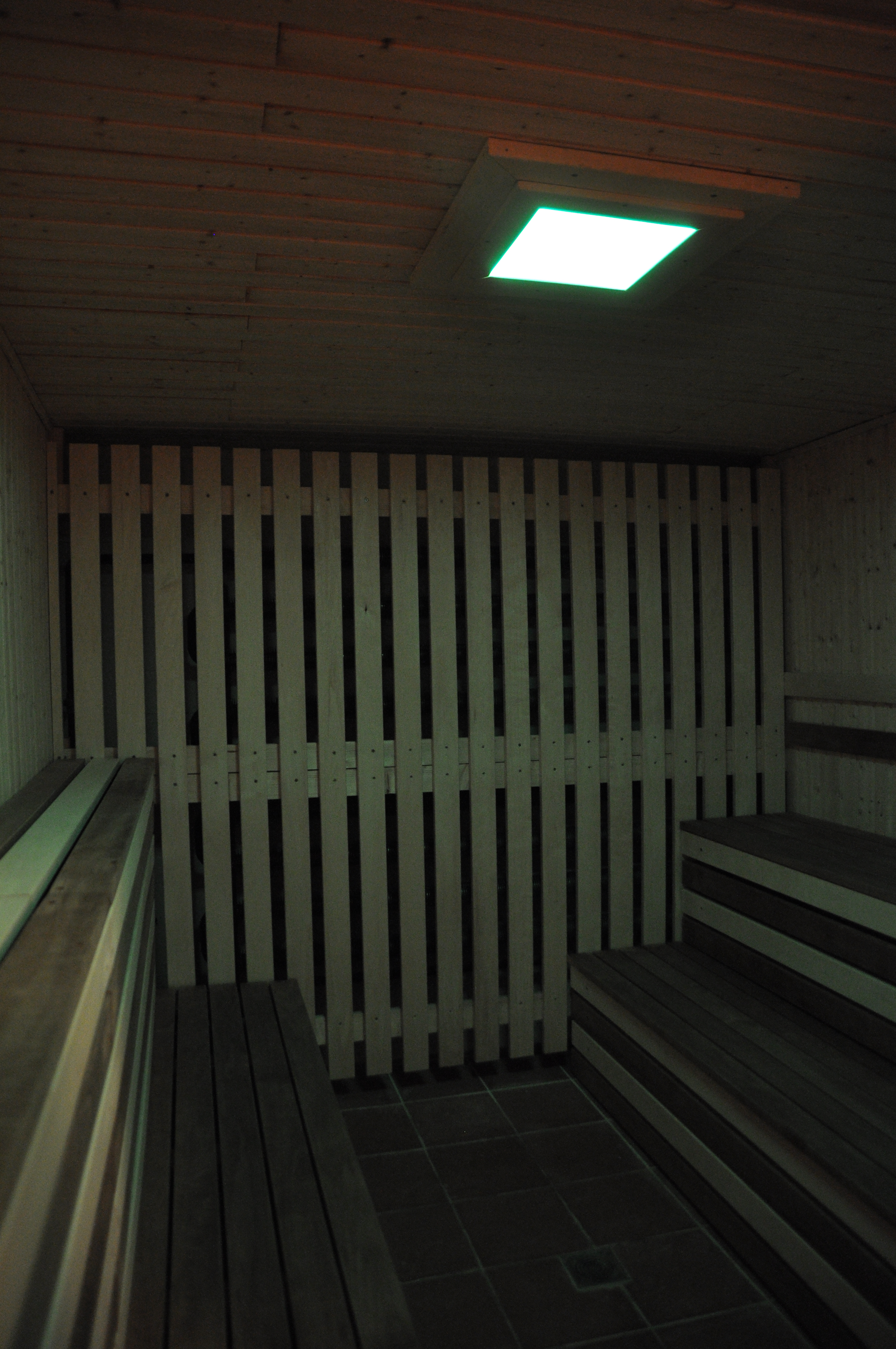
Dry sauna

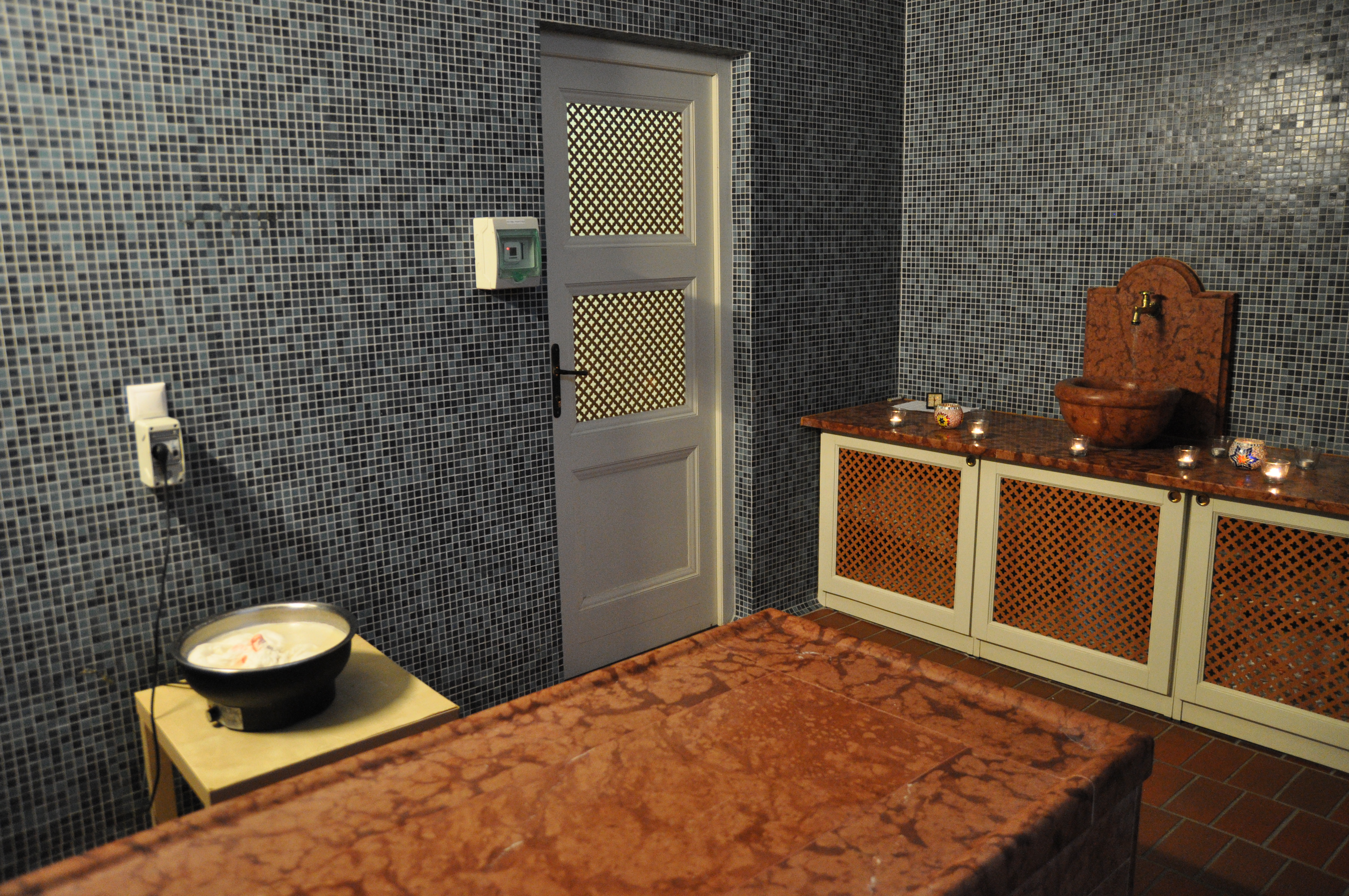
Turkish massage

The hot spring water is rich in calcium hyrodgencarbonate, calcium hydrogensulfite, and magnesium hydrogencarbonate and magnesium hydrogensulphate; chloride; and also contain sodium and a substantial content of fluoride ions.

=== Swimming section ===
- Two swimming pools with temperatures of 22–24 °C (72–75 °F) and 26 °C (79 °F)
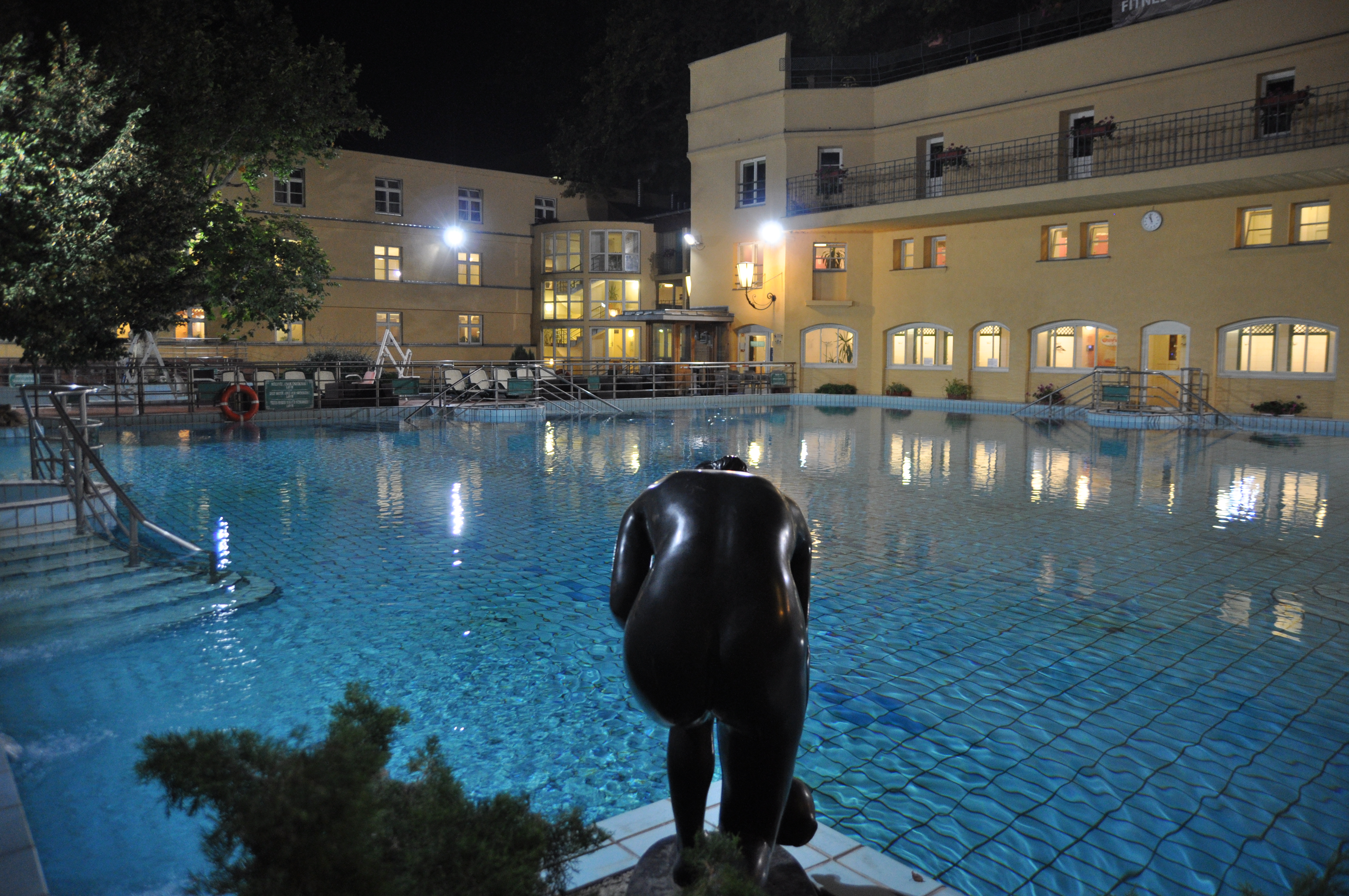
Men's swimming pool (22-24 °C)

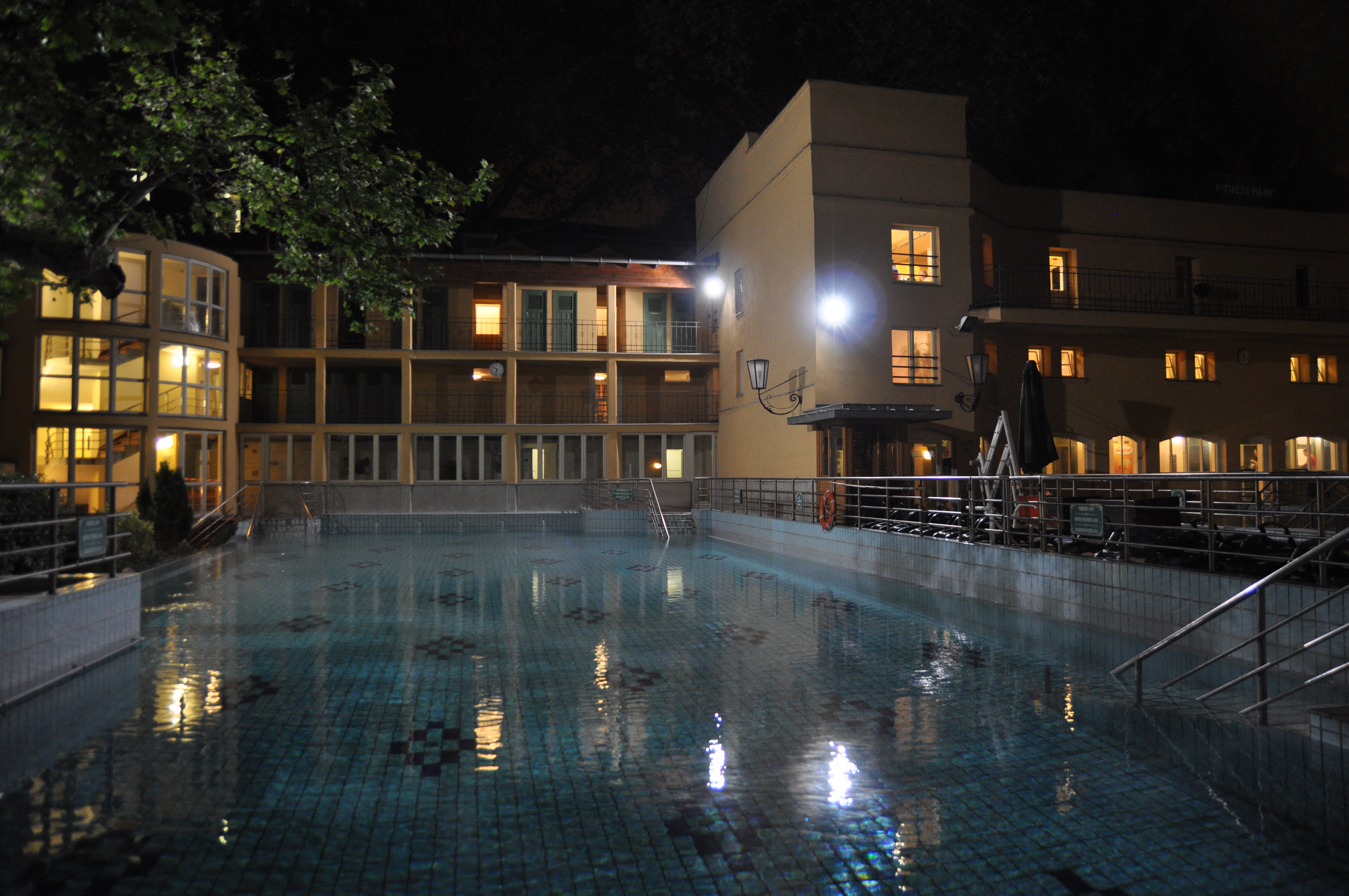
Women's swimming pool (26 °C)

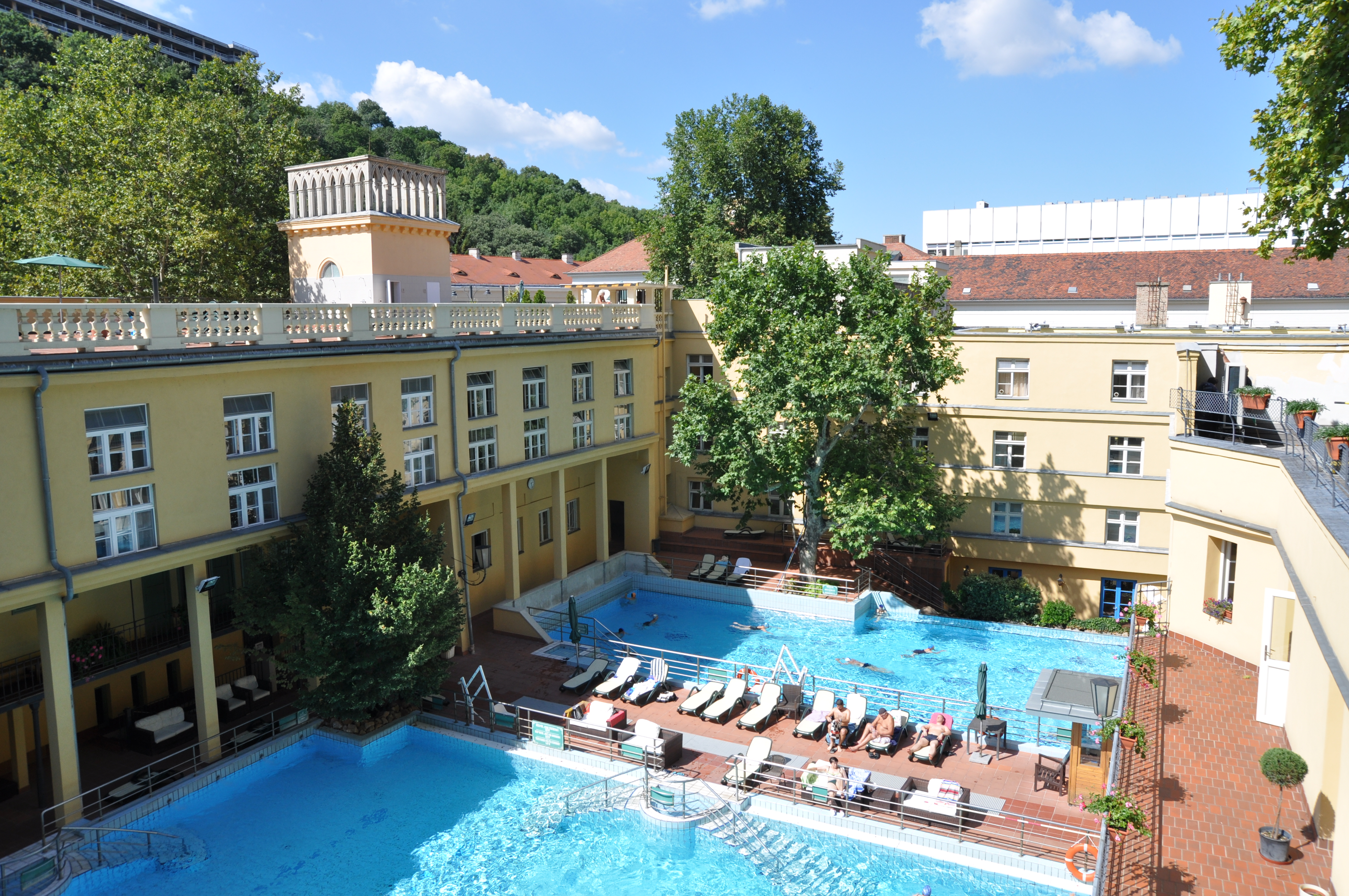
Swimming pools

=== Wellness section ===
- Leisure pool with 33 °C (91 °F) temperature (mixed with thermal and normal water)
- Finnish sauna and herbal sauna
- Kneipp pool
- Salt wall (decoration)
- Cooling pool
- Rental and inner cassa
- Canteen
- Lounge
- Gymnastic pool
- Weight treatment (doctor receipt)
- Mud treatment (doctor receipt)
- Massage
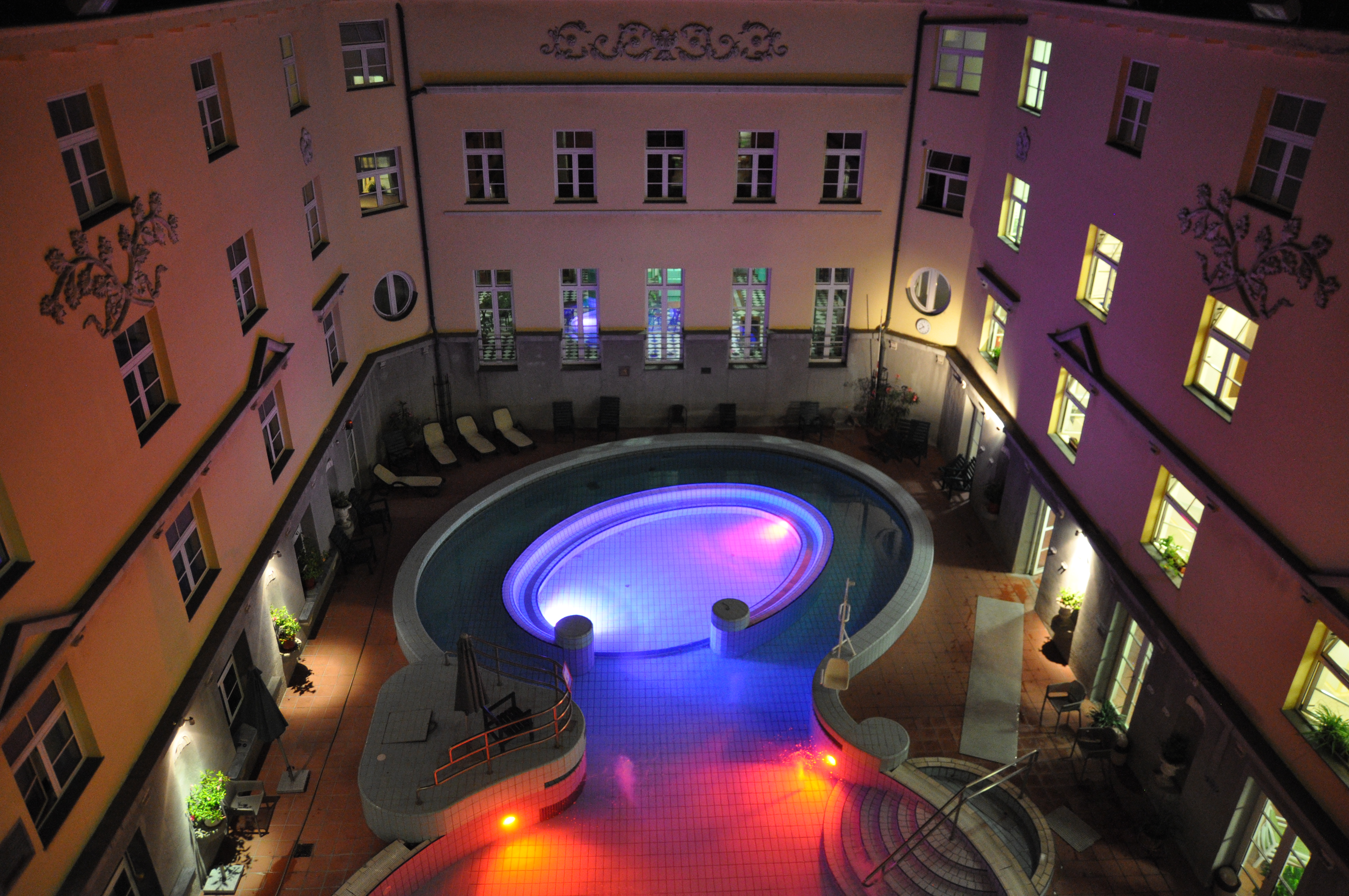
Leisure pool (33 °C)

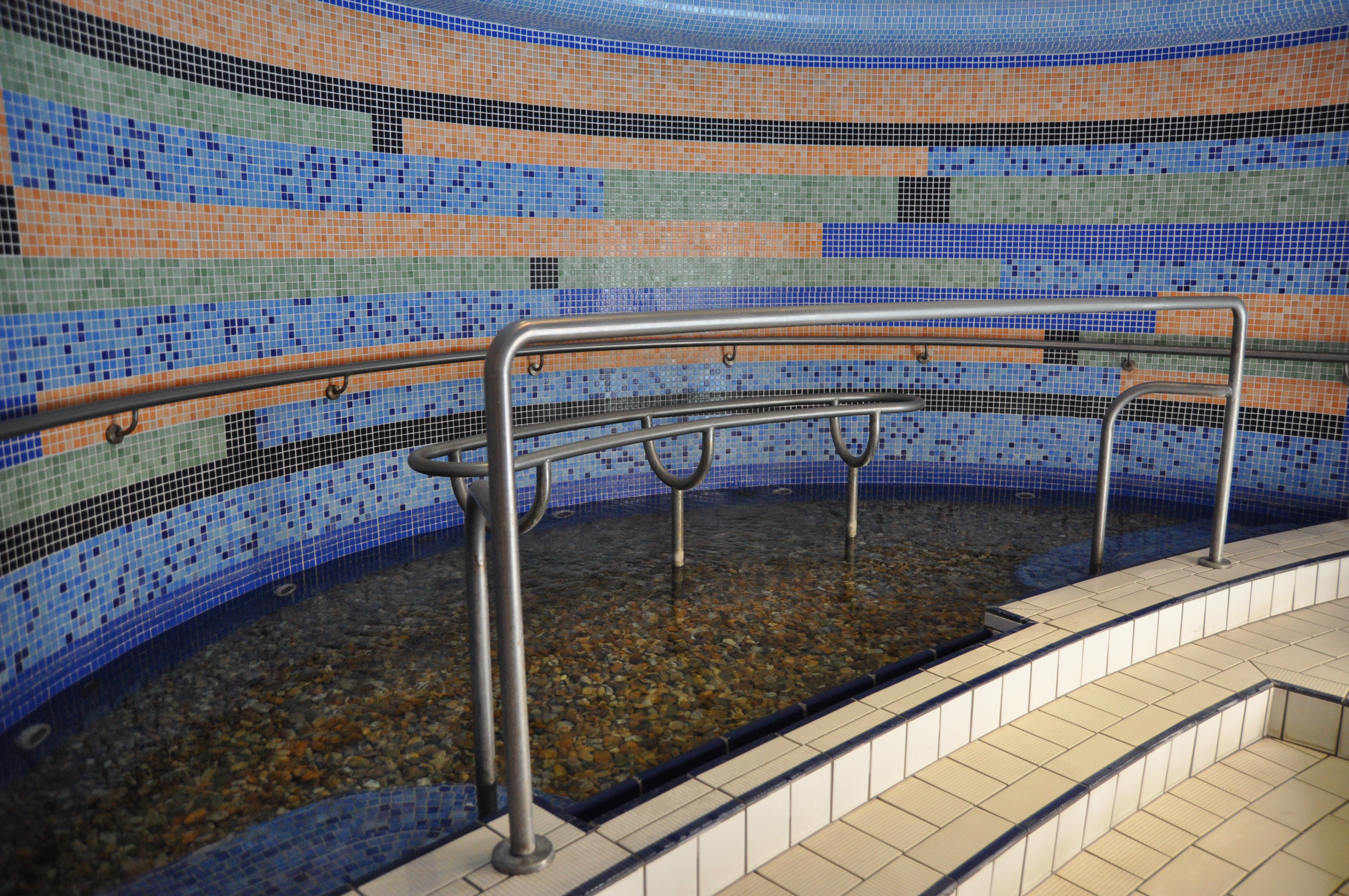
Kneipp pool

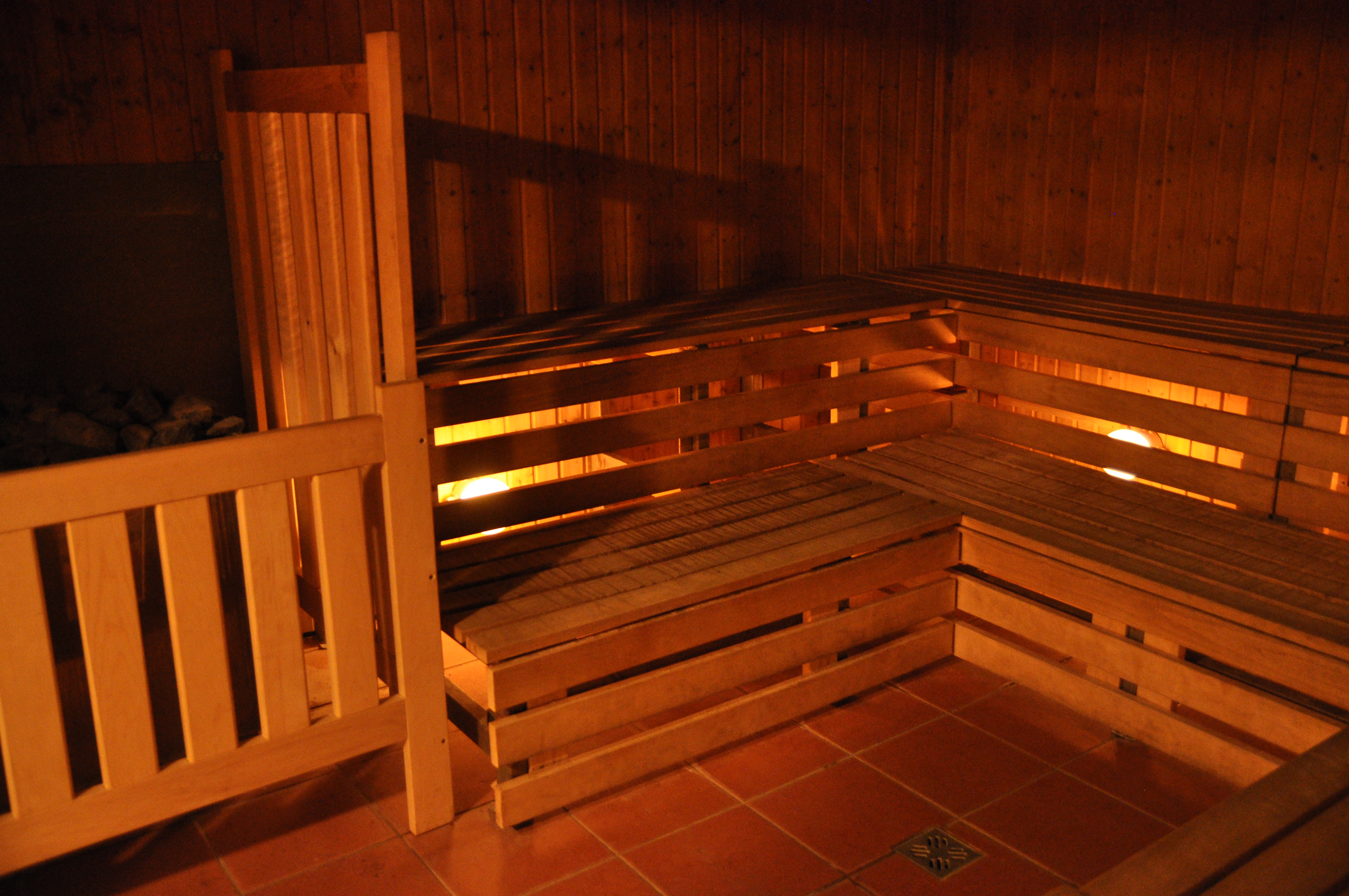
Finnish sauna

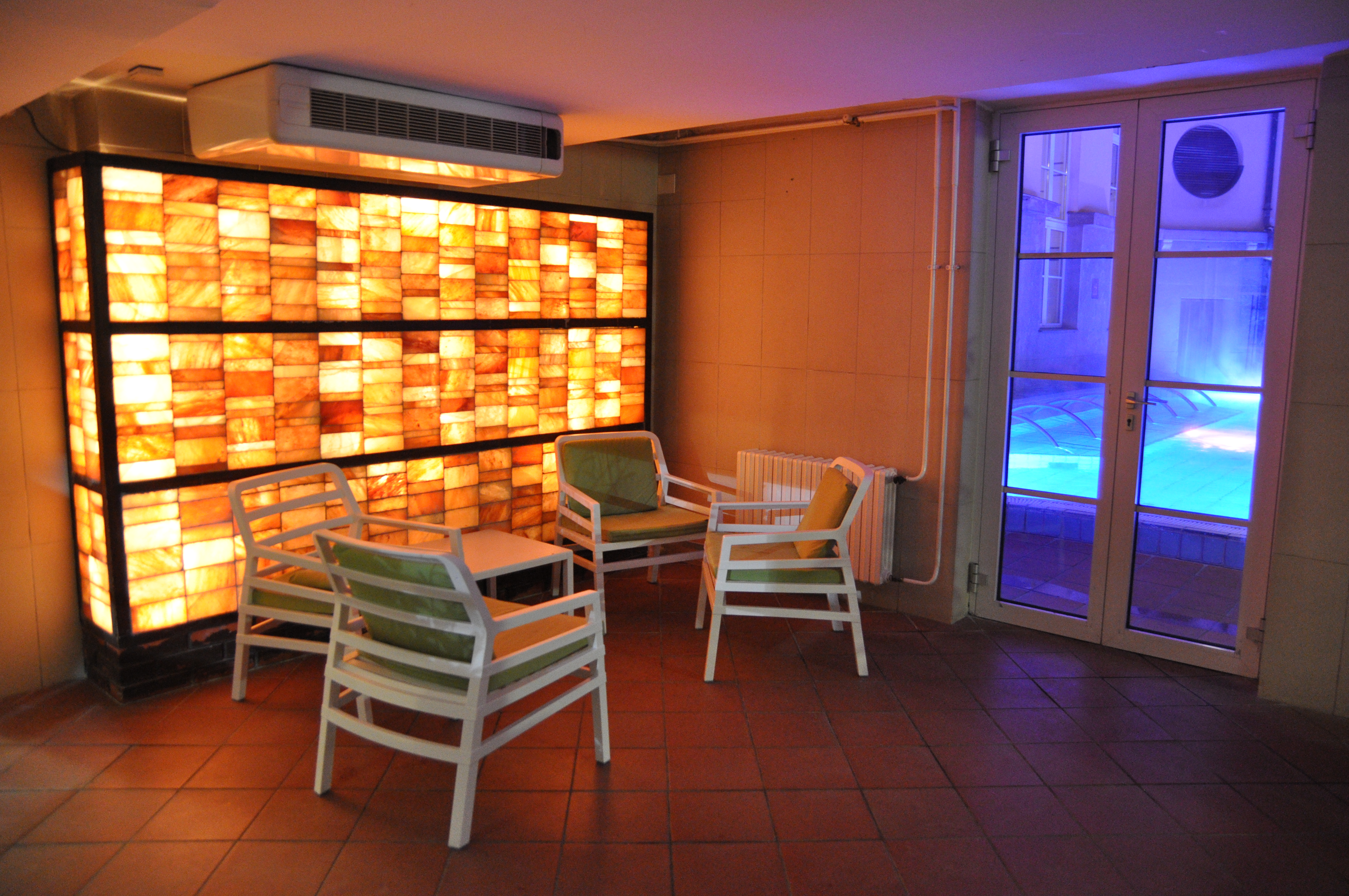
Salt wall

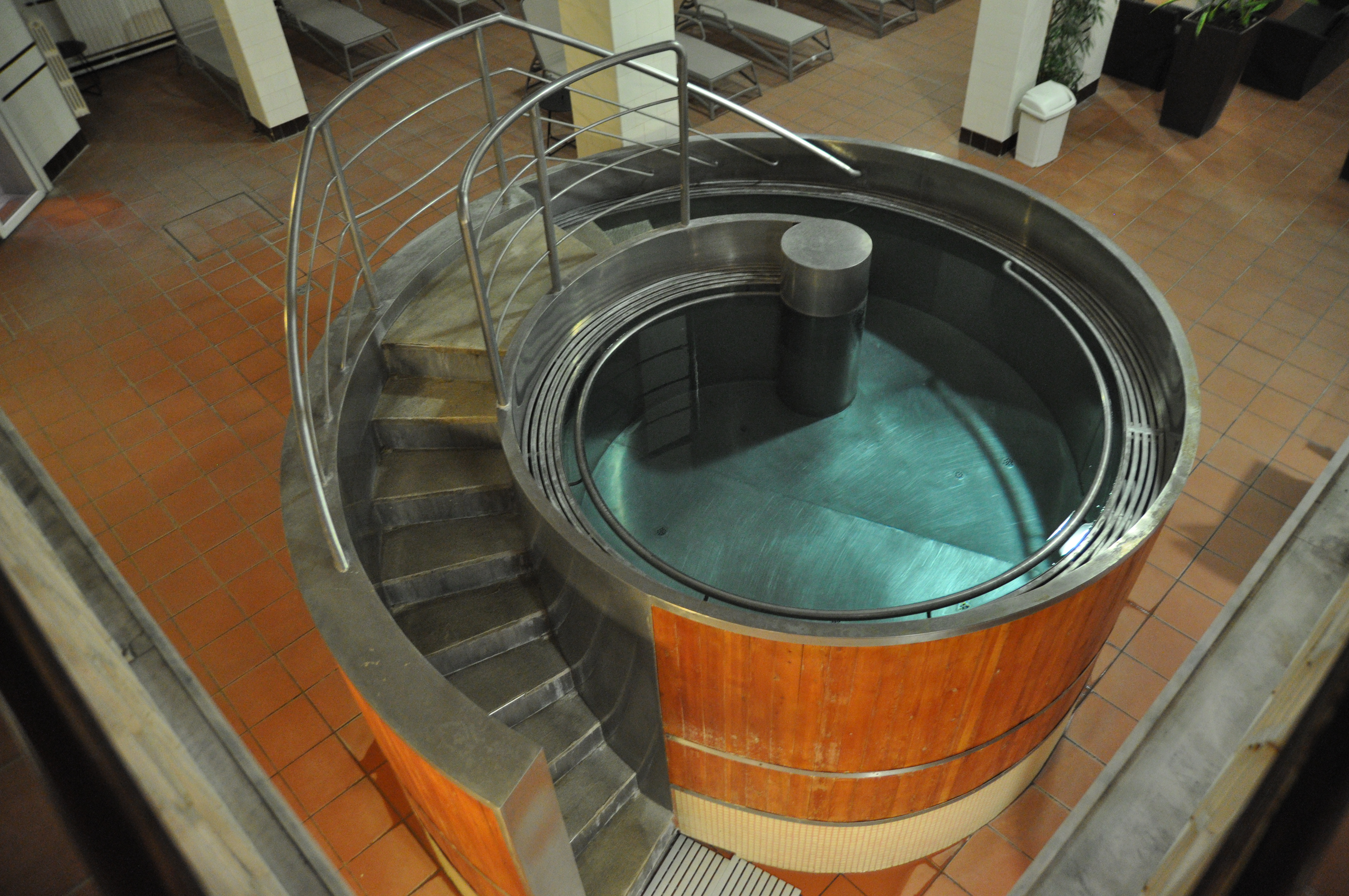
Cooling pool

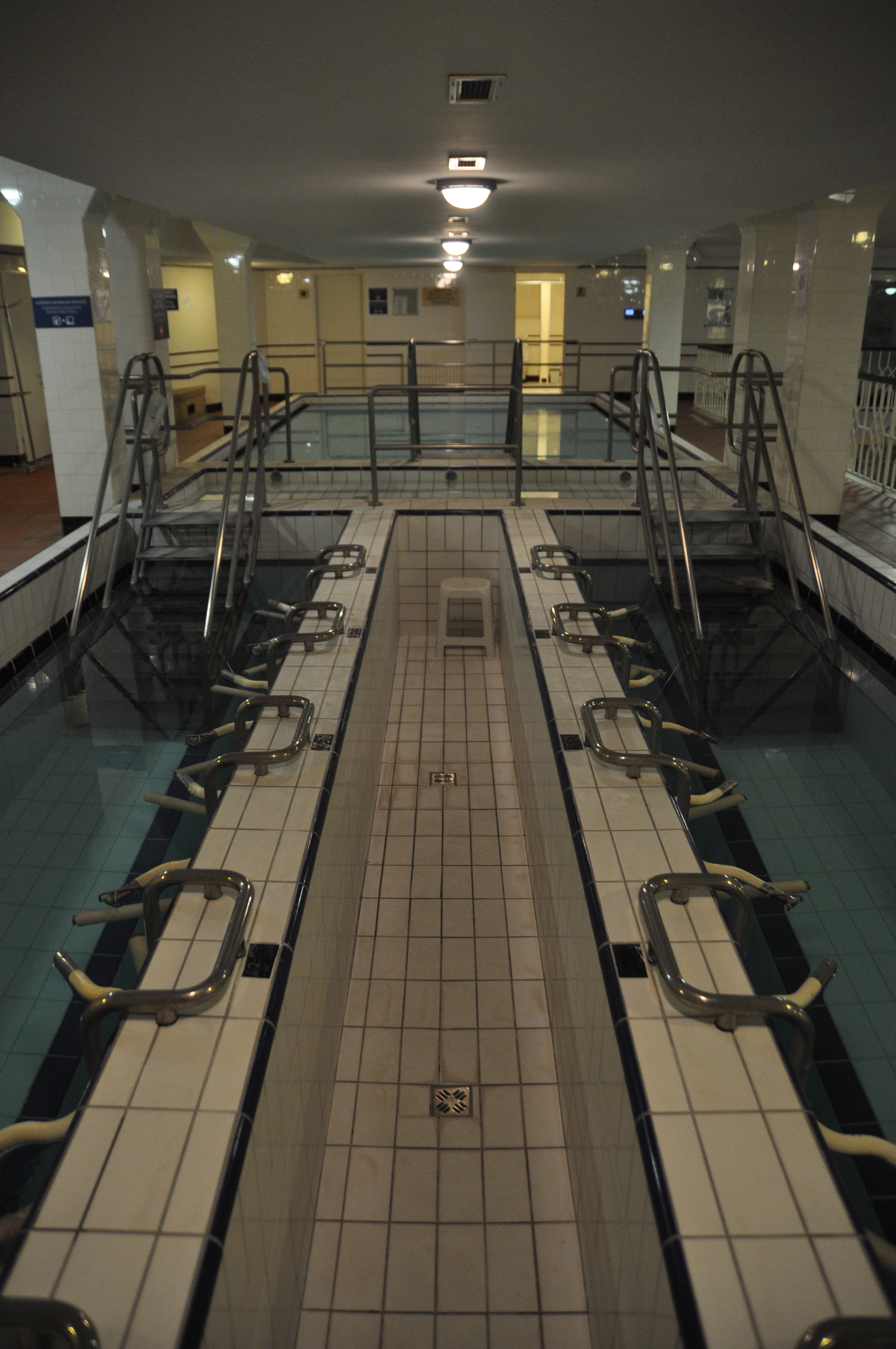
Weight treatment

=== Sauna world ===
In this section, people are to wear sauna sheets instead of their swimwear.

- Finnish (program) sauna
- Steam room
- Nudist sauna
- Infra sauna
- Salt sauna
- Ice cooling pool
- Heated roman bench
- Igloo
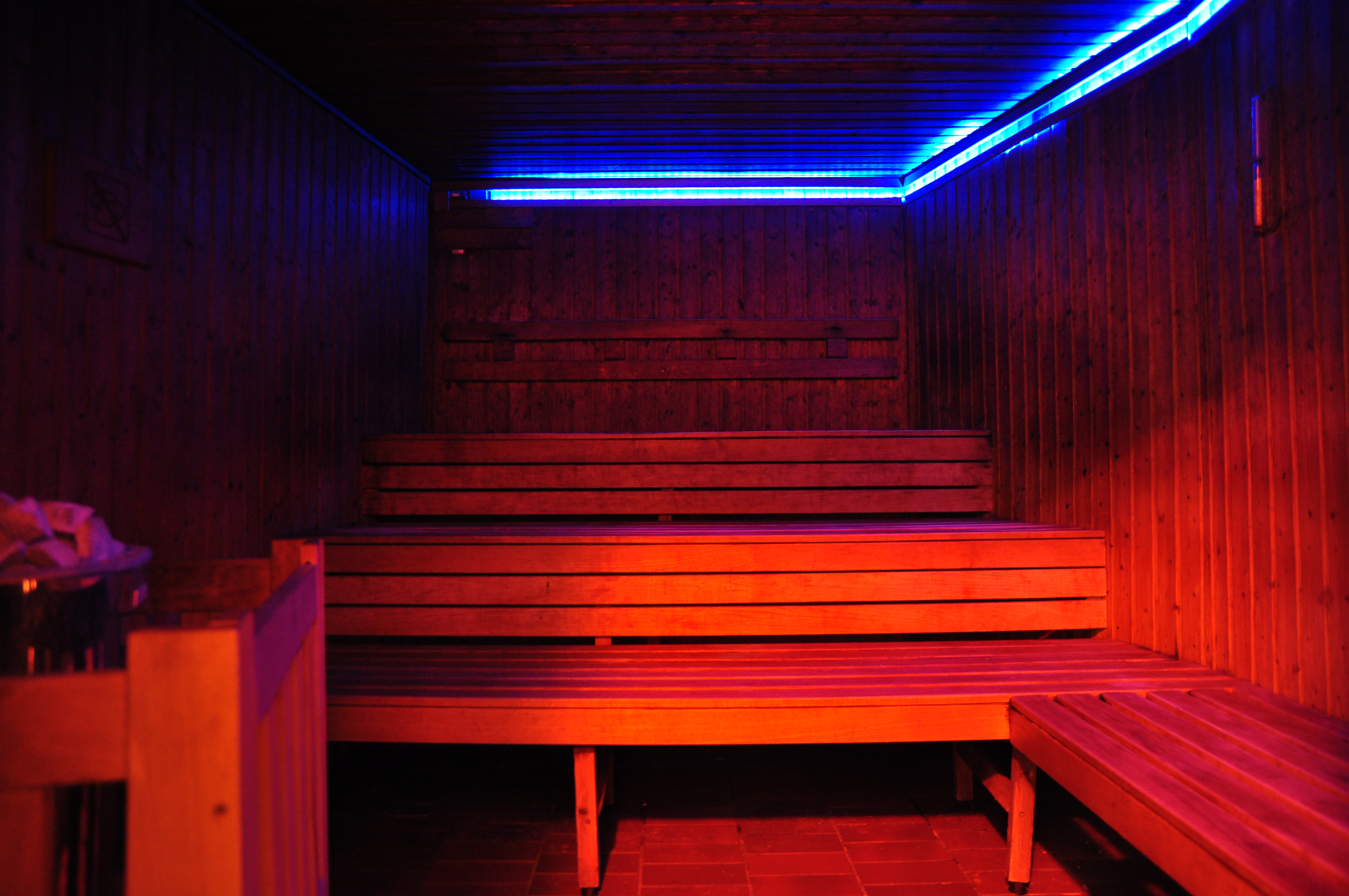
Finnish sauna

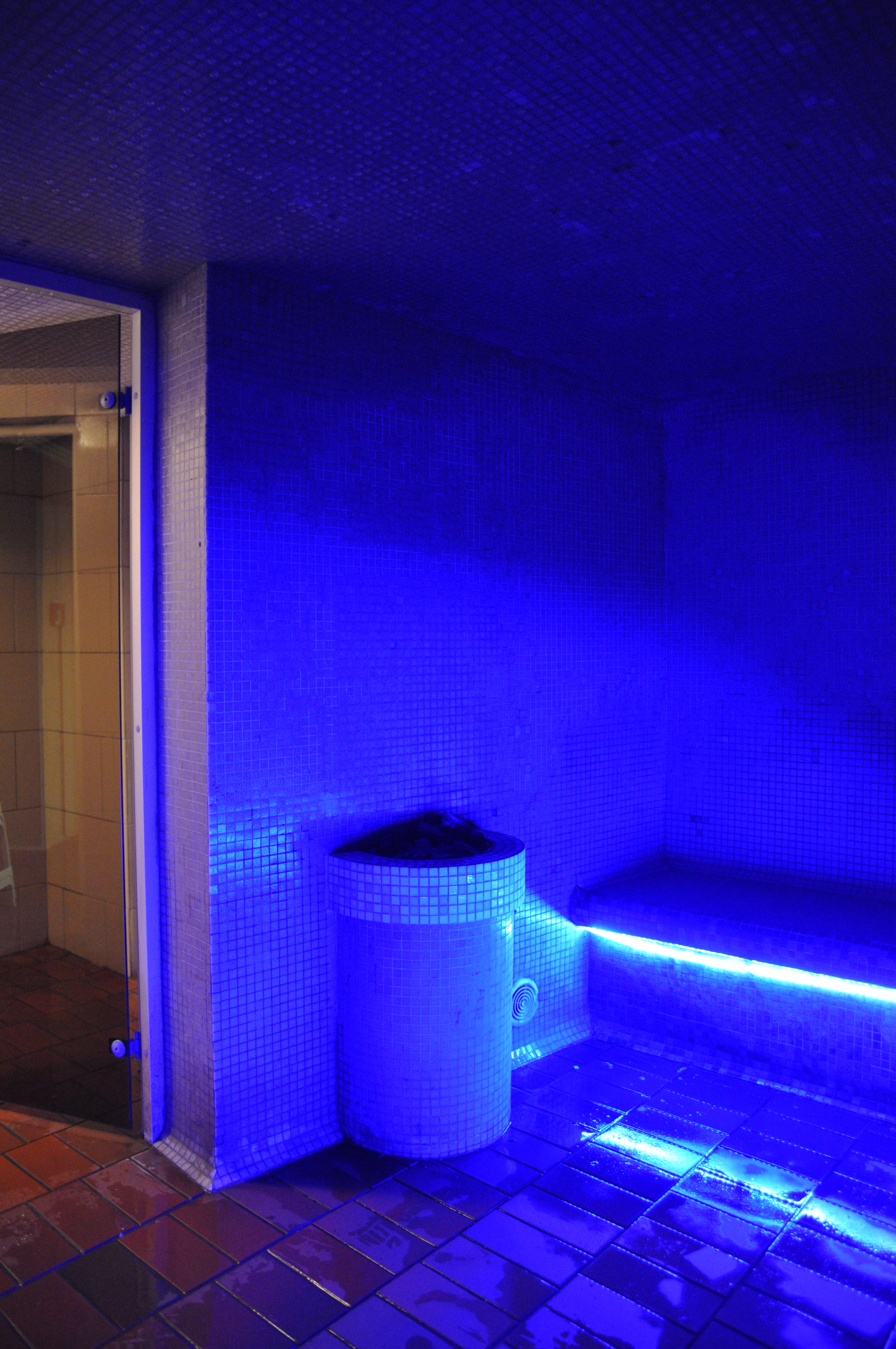
Steam room

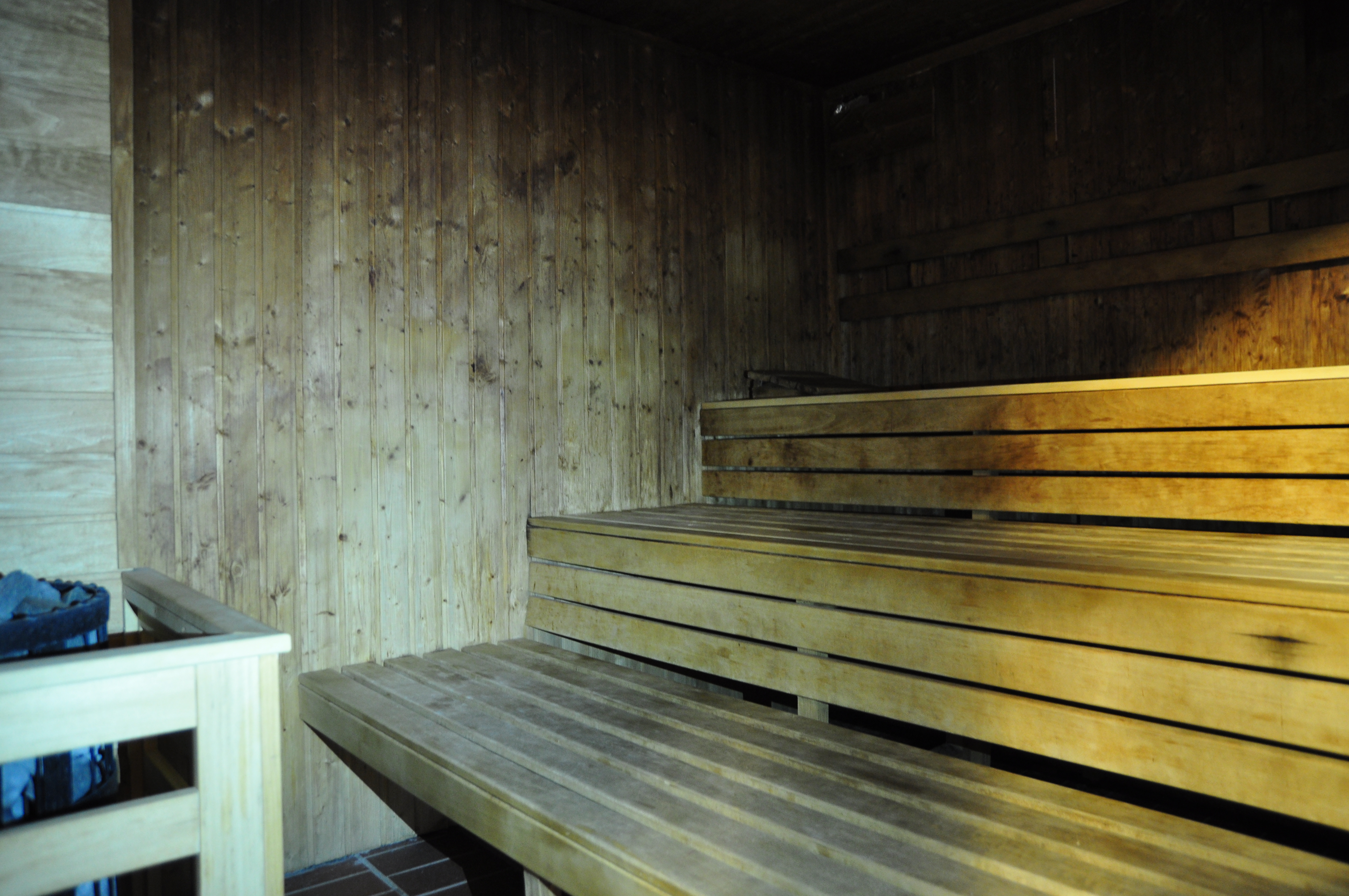
Nudist sauna

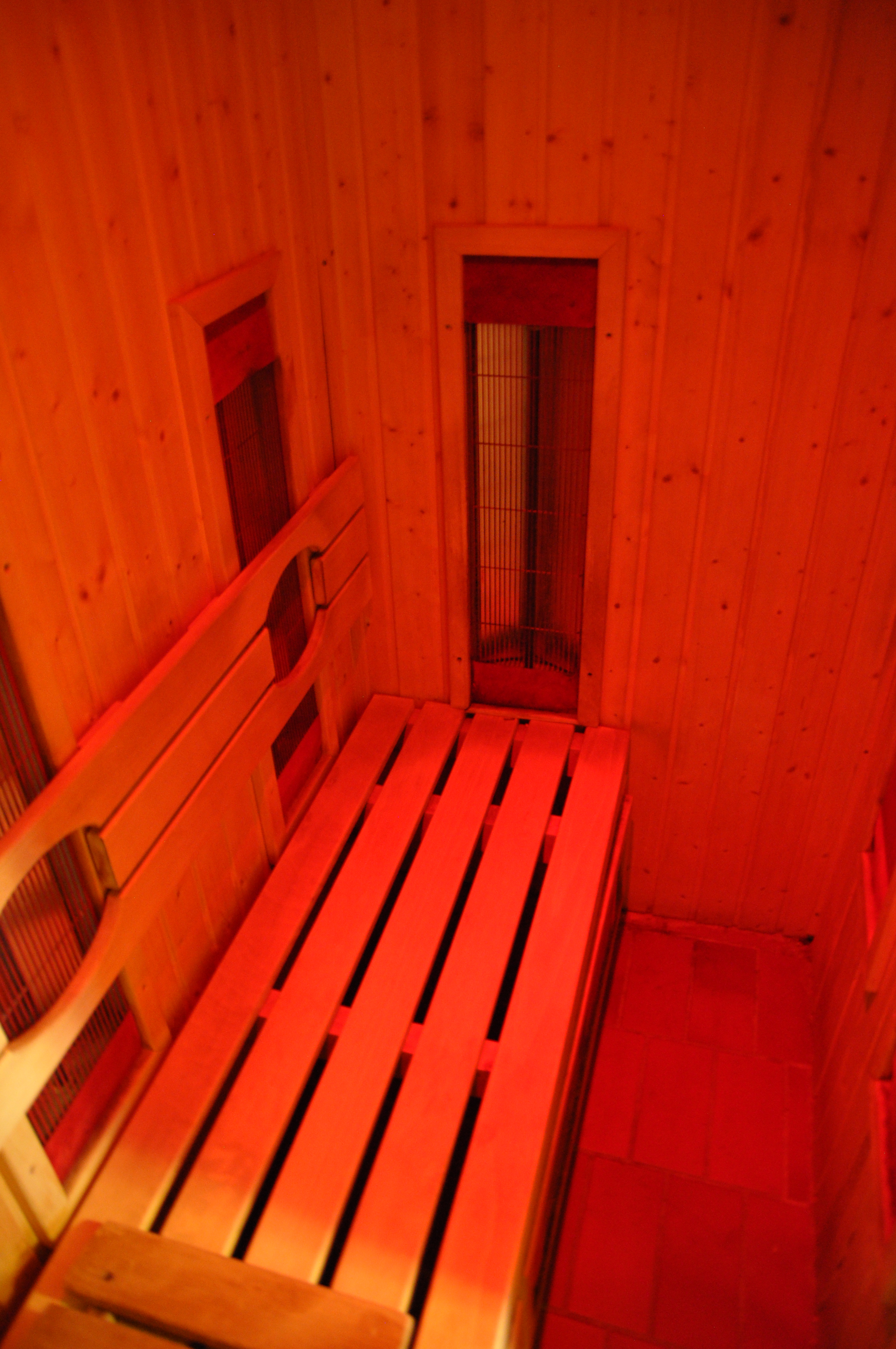
Infra sauna

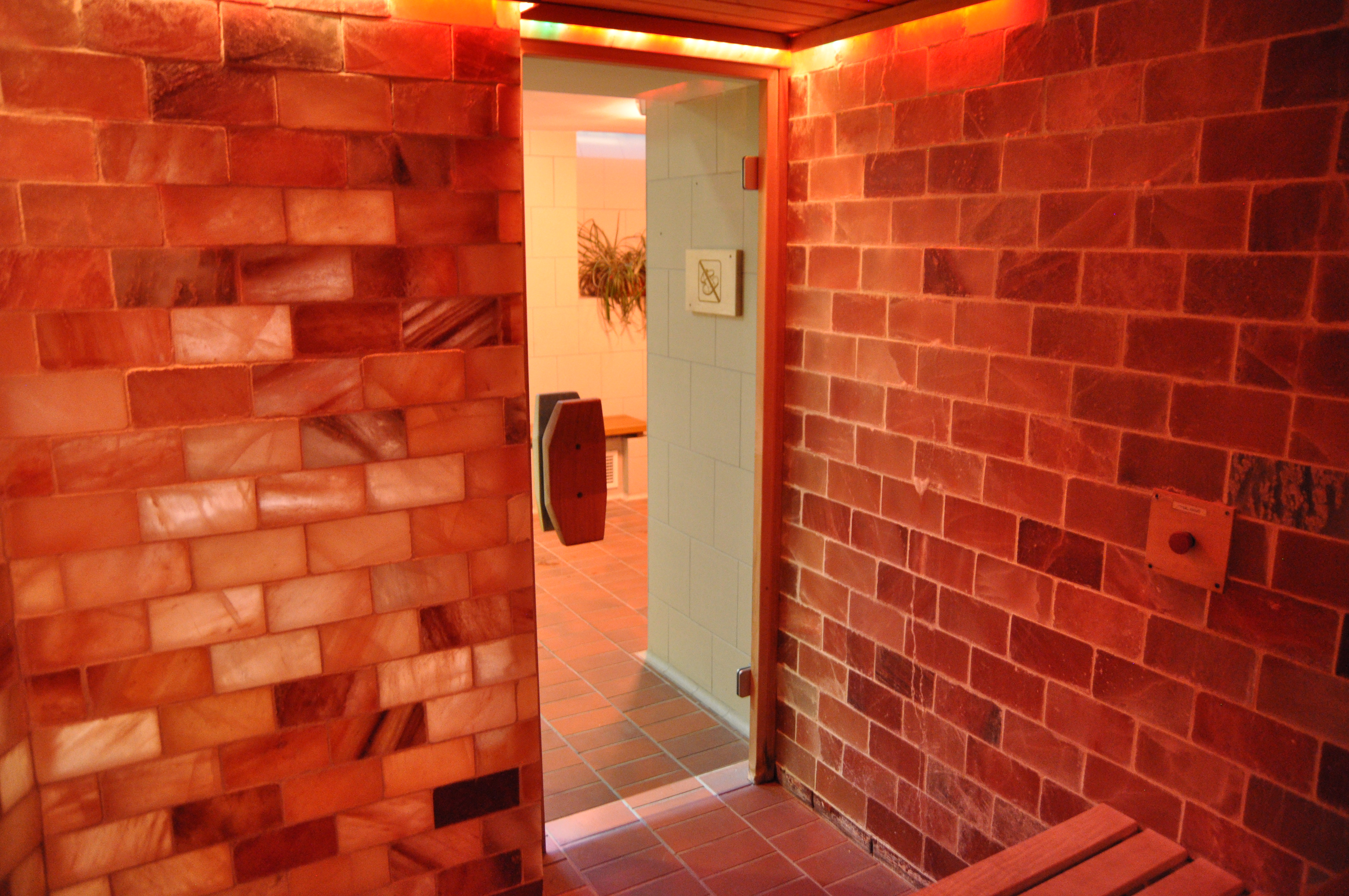
Salt sauna

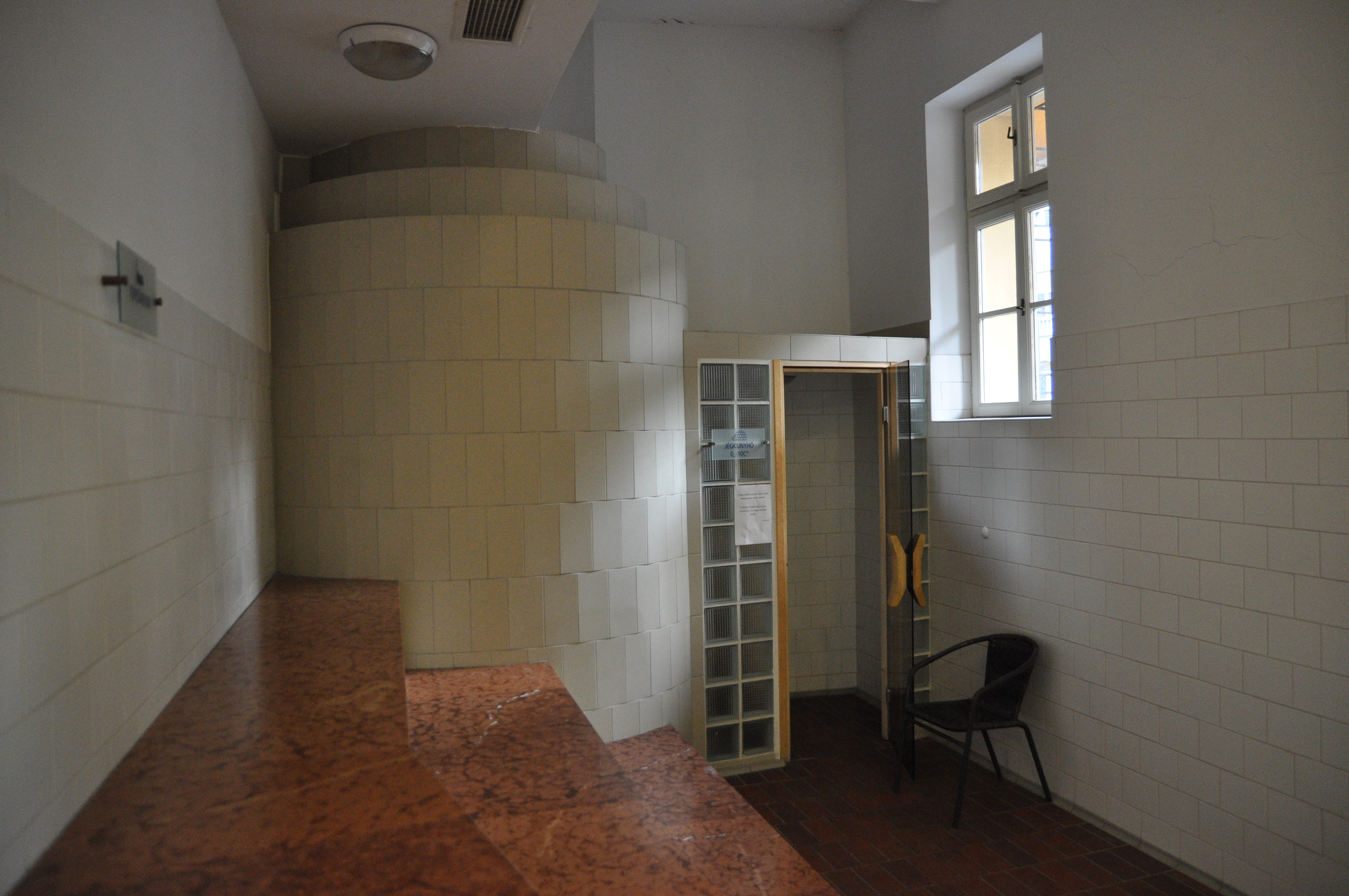
Igloo

=== Tub section ===
- Private bath
- Massage
- Tub treatments (doctor receipt)

=== Gallery ===
- Exhibition of paintings and photography
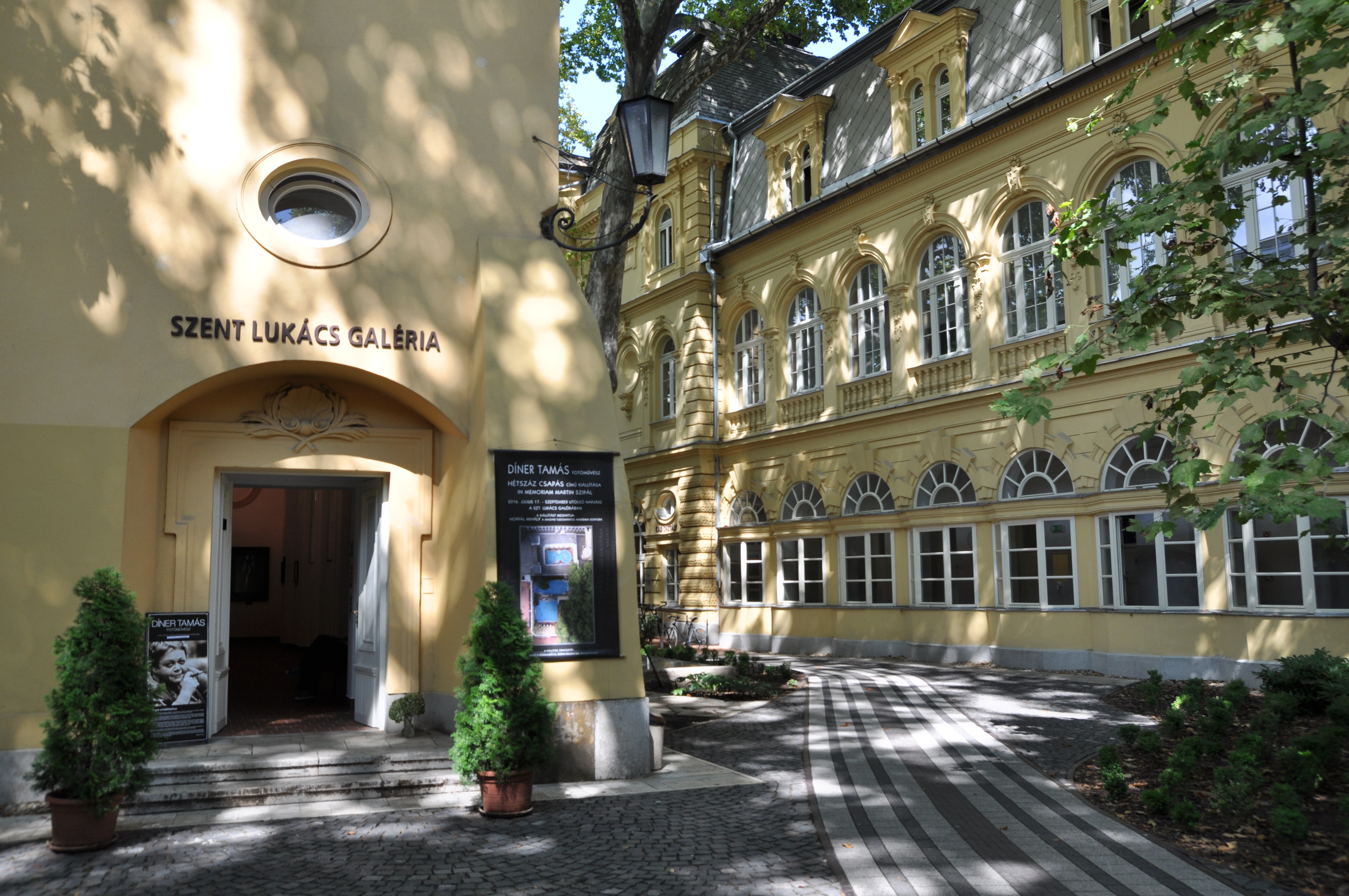

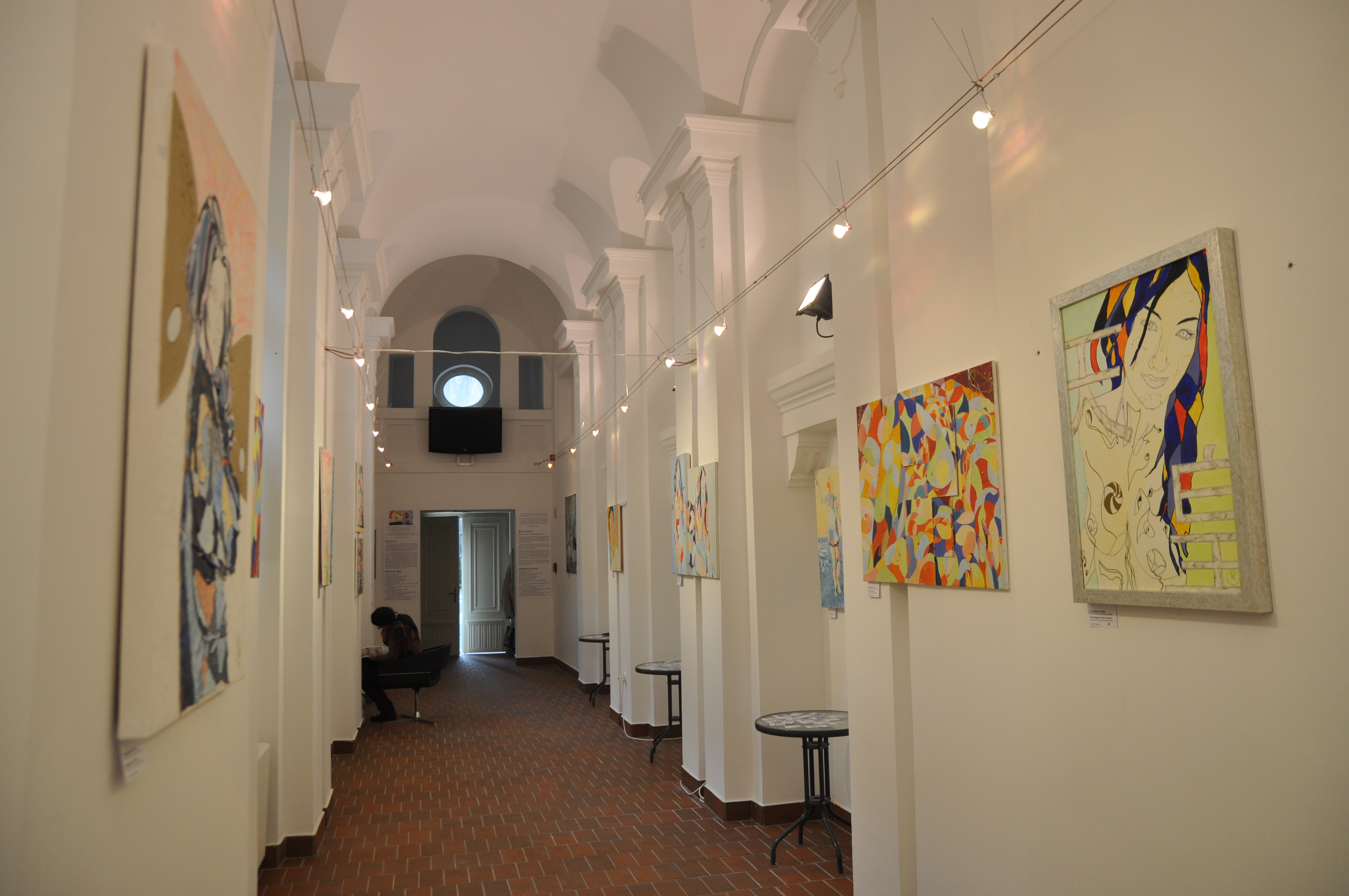

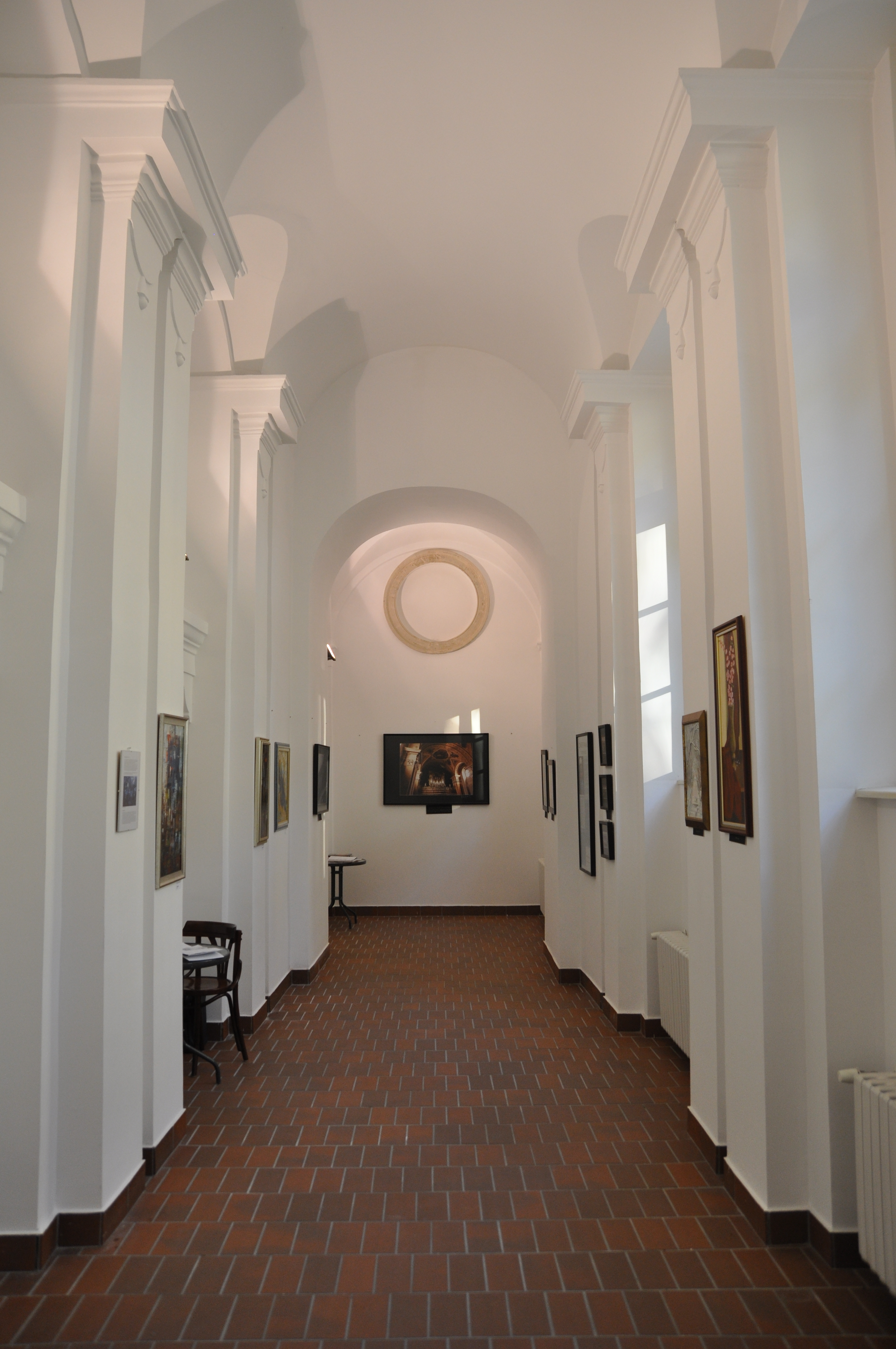

=== Event room ===
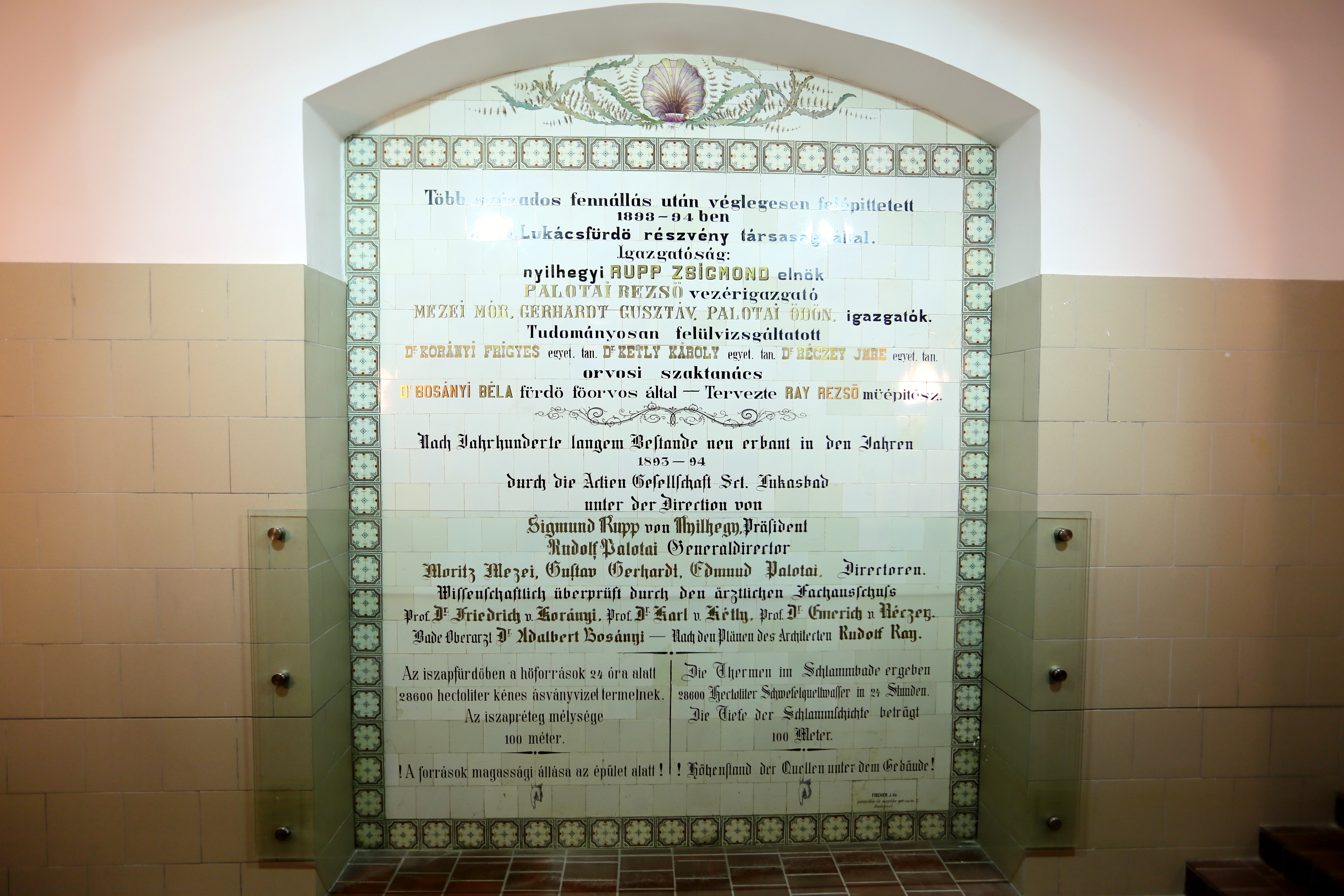
Foundation article

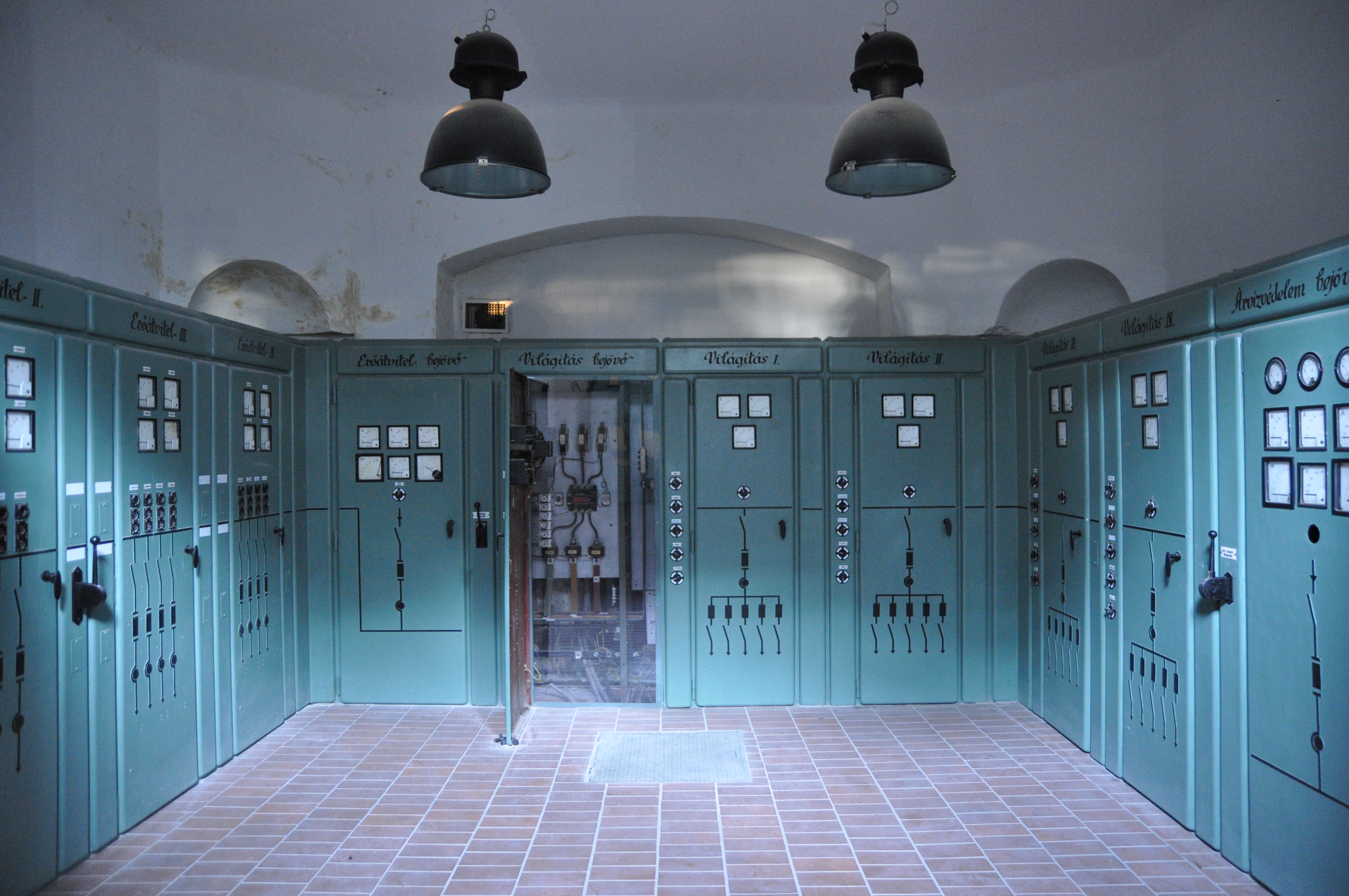
Old switch boxes

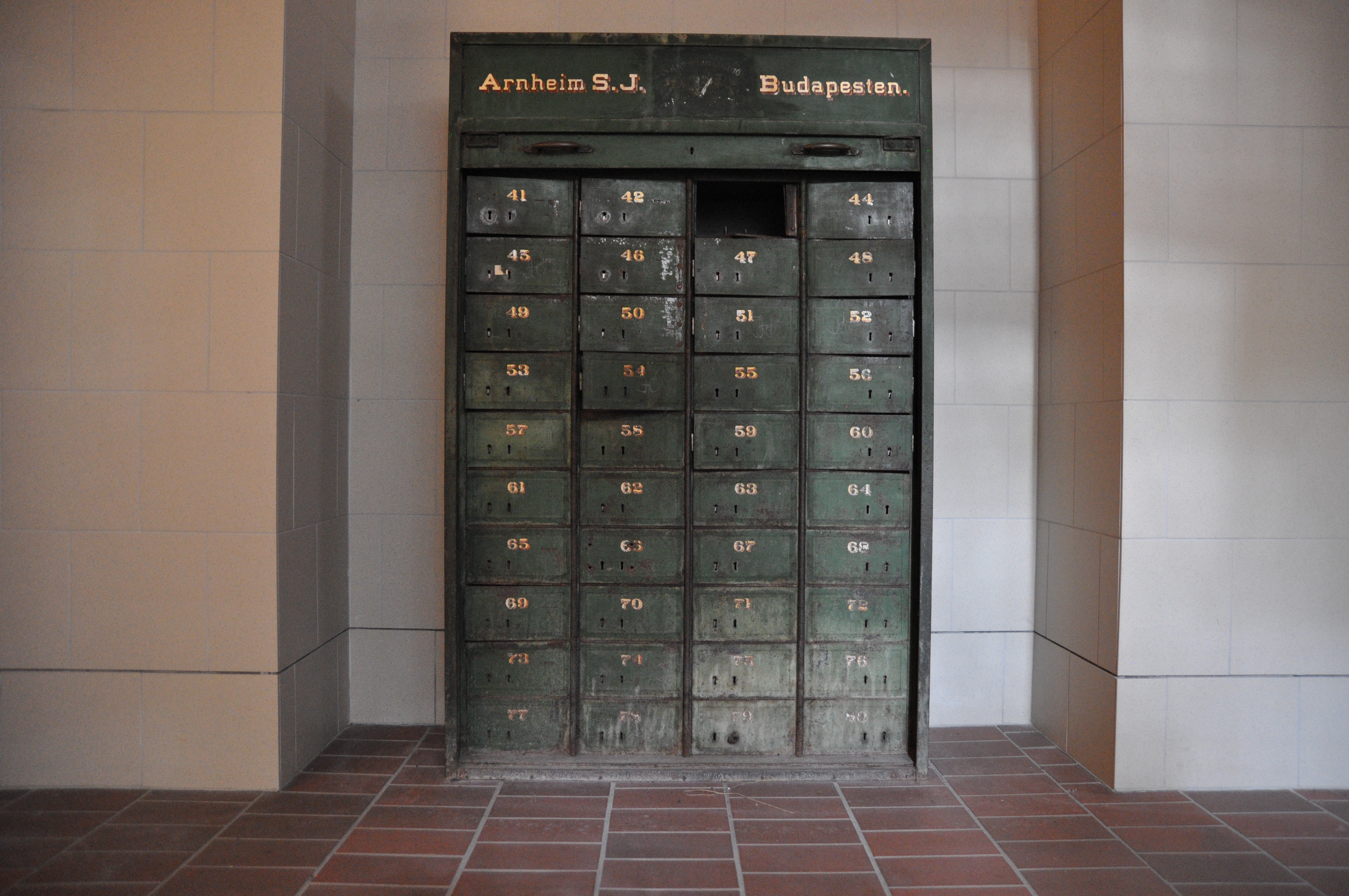
Old safe boxes

=== Hospital ===
At floor number 2, there is a hospital for customised treatments.
