= Meat Industry Museum =

Museum in Budapest, Hungary

Coordinates: 47°27′41″N 19°05′17″E

The Meat Industry Museum (in Hungarian Húsipari Múzeum) was a Hungarian industrial history museum in Budapest (specialist collection) that operated between 1974 and the 2010s in the area of the former Budapest Pig Slaughterhouse. The objects are currently owned by the Hungarian Agricultural Museum.

== History ==
After the nationalization in 1948, the EDOSZ Archive was created, where historical documents of the various industries of the food industry were collected. In 1969, the National Meat Industry Research Institute was entrusted with the collection of documents and publications dealing with the history of animal traffic and the meat industry. The exhibition opened 5 years later, in 1974, initially as an industrial history collection in the area of the Budapest Pig Slaughterhouse and the National Meat Research Institute (Gubacsi út 6/b). It was reclassified as a museum from 1976.

In 1990, the museum moved from its former location to another building built at the beginning of the 20th century.

The museum did not have permanent opening hours. It could be visited after registration.

The museum's permanent exhibition The History of the Meat Industry in the Carpathian Basin, with two rooms and an outdoor exhibition space outside the building presented the history of the ancient meat industry and the history of the butcher-butcher trade, which gradually developed into an industry from the second half of the 19th century.

== Termination ==
The Budapest Pig Slaughterhouse was demolished in 2001. After that, the museum also ceased to exist in the 2010s. His artefacts were given to the Hungarian Agricultural Museum in 2016. After that, the Hungarian Agricultural Museum organized a temporary exhibition of the objects (supplemented with its own related material) entitled "Húsmíves mesterség in Hungary" in Vajdahunyad Castle, which could be visited between September 21, 2016, and February 26, 2017.

== Sources ==
- "Húsipari Múzeum Budapest". chemonet.hu.
- "Országos Húsipari Kutatóintézet – Húsipari Múzeum". museum.hu.
- "A húsipar története a Kárpát-medencében". museum.hu.
- "Húsipari Múzeum". artportal.hu. Archived from the original on 2024-01-02.
- (főszerk.) Balassa M. Iván: Magyarország múzeumai. Múzeumlátogatók kézikönyve, Vince Kiadó Kft., Budapest, 2001, ISBN 963-9192-93-7
- Dr. Koncz Erzsébet – Dr. Szabolcs Ottó: Barangolás Budapesten. Kézikönyv a főváros múzeumait látogatók számára, Korona Kiadó, Budapest, 1995
- [Ghimessy László]: A Húsipari Múzeum, Állatforgalmi és Húsipari Tröszt, Országos Húsipari Kutatóintézet, Budapest, 1984 [!1985]
- Siki J.: Ipartörténeti gyűjtésünk eddigi eredményei In: Húsipar (1975), 24., 6., 250–259.
