= List of members of the European Parliament for Hungary, 2009–2014 =

Members of the European Parliament for Hungary
| Observers | (2003) |
| Delegation | (2004) |
| 6th term | (2004) |
| 7th term | (2009) |
| 8th term | (2014) |
| 9th term | (2019) |
| 10th term | (2024) |

This is a list of the 22 members of the European Parliament for Hungary in the 2009 to 2014 session.

== List ==
| Name | National party | EP Group |
|---|---|---|
| János Áder | Fidesz – Hungarian Civic Alliance (Fidesz) | EPP |
| Zoltán Balczó | Jobbik, the Movement for a Better Hungary (Jobbik) | NI |
| Zoltán Bagó | Fidesz – Hungarian Civic Alliance (Fidesz) | EPP |
| Lajos Bokros | Democratic Forum (MDF) | ECR |
| Tamás Deutsch | Fidesz – Hungarian Civic Alliance (Fidesz) | EPP |
| Kinga Gál | Fidesz – Hungarian Civic Alliance (Fidesz) | EPP |
| Béla Glattfelder | Fidesz – Hungarian Civic Alliance (Fidesz) | EPP |
| Kinga Göncz | Socialist Party (MSZP) | S&D |
| Zita Gurmai | Socialist Party (MSZP) | S&D |
| Enikő Győri | Fidesz – Hungarian Civic Alliance (Fidesz) | EPP |
| András Gyürk | Fidesz – Hungarian Civic Alliance (Fidesz) | EPP |
| Ágnes Hankiss | Fidesz – Hungarian Civic Alliance (Fidesz) | EPP |
| Edit Herczog | Socialist Party (MSZP) | S&D |
| Balázs Hidvéghi | Fidesz – Hungarian Civic Alliance (Fidesz) | EPP |
| Lívia Járóka | Fidesz – Hungarian Civic Alliance (Fidesz) | EPP |
| Béla Kovács | Jobbik, the Movement for a Better Hungary (Jobbik) | NI |
| Ádám Kósa | Fidesz – Hungarian Civic Alliance (Fidesz) | EPP |
| Krisztina Morvai | Jobbik, the Movement for a Better Hungary (Jobbik) | NI |
| Csaba Őry | Fidesz – Hungarian Civic Alliance (Fidesz) | EPP |
| Ildikó Pelczné Gáll | Fidesz – Hungarian Civic Alliance (Fidesz) | EPP |
| Pál Schmitt | Fidesz – Hungarian Civic Alliance (Fidesz) | EPP |
| György Schöpflin | Fidesz – Hungarian Civic Alliance (Fidesz) | EPP |
| László Surján | Fidesz – Hungarian Civic Alliance (Fidesz) | EPP |
| József Szájer | Fidesz – Hungarian Civic Alliance (Fidesz) | EPP |
| Csanád Szegedi | Jobbik, the Movement for a Better Hungary (Jobbik) | NI |
| Csaba Tabajdi | Socialist Party (MSZP) | S&D |

=== Party representation ===
| National party | EP Group | Seats | ± |
|---|---|---|---|
| Fidesz – Hungarian Civic Alliance (Fidesz) | EPP | 14 / 22 | ▲2 |
| Socialist Party (MSZP) | S&D | 4 / 22 | ▼5 |
| Jobbik, the Movement for a Better Hungary (Jobbik) | NI | 3 / 22 | ▲3 |
| Democratic Forum (MDF) | ECR | 1 / 22 | Steady |

== See also ==
- Members of the European Parliament 2009–14 – List by country
- List of members of the European Parliament, 2009–14 – Full alphabetical list
- 2009 European Parliament election in Hungary
- 2009 European Parliament election
- Parliamentary Groups
