= List of members of the European Parliament for Hungary, 2004–2009 =

Members of the European Parliament for Hungary
Observers	(2003)
Delegation	(2004)
6th term	(2004)
7th term	(2009)
8th term	(2014)
9th term	(2019)
10th term	(2024)

This is a list of the 24 members of the European Parliament for Hungary in the 2004 to 2009 session.

== List ==
Name	National party	EP Group
Etelka Barsiné Pataky	Fidesz – Hungarian Civic Alliance (Fidesz)	EPP–ED
Zsolt Becsey	Fidesz – Hungarian Civic Alliance (Fidesz)	EPP–ED
Antonio De Blasio	Fidesz – Hungarian Civic Alliance (Fidesz)	EPP–ED
Gábor Demszky	Alliance of Free Democrats (SZDSZ)	ALDE
Alexandra Dobolyi	Socialist Party (MSZP)	PES
Szabolcs Fazakas	Socialist Party (MSZP)	PES
Kinga Gál	Fidesz – Hungarian Civic Alliance (Fidesz)	EPP–ED
Béla Glattfelder	Fidesz – Hungarian Civic Alliance (Fidesz)	EPP–ED
Zita Gurmai	Socialist Party (MSZP)	PES
András Gyürk	Fidesz – Hungarian Civic Alliance (Fidesz)	EPP–ED
Gábor Harangozó	Socialist Party (MSZP)	PES
Gyula Hegyi	Socialist Party (MSZP)	PES
Edit Herczog	Socialist Party (MSZP)	PES
Lívia Járóka	Fidesz – Hungarian Civic Alliance (Fidesz)	EPP–ED
Magda Kósáné Kovács	Socialist Party (MSZP)	PES
Katalin Lévai	Socialist Party (MSZP)	PES
Viktória Mohácsi	Alliance of Free Democrats (SZDSZ)	ALDE
Péter Olajos	Democratic Forum (MDF)	EPP–ED
Csaba Őry	Fidesz – Hungarian Civic Alliance (Fidesz)	EPP–ED
István Pálfi	Fidesz – Hungarian Civic Alliance (Fidesz)	EPP–ED
Pál Schmitt	Fidesz – Hungarian Civic Alliance (Fidesz)	EPP–ED
György Schöpflin	Fidesz – Hungarian Civic Alliance (Fidesz)	EPP–ED
László Surján	Fidesz – Hungarian Civic Alliance (Fidesz)	EPP–ED
József Szájer	Fidesz – Hungarian Civic Alliance (Fidesz)	EPP–ED
István Szent-Iványi	Alliance of Free Democrats (SZDSZ)	ALDE
Csaba Sándor Tabajdi	Socialist Party (MSZP)	PES

=== Party representation ===
National party	EP Group	Seats
Fidesz – Hungarian Civic Union (Fidesz)	EPP–ED	12 / 24
Socialist Party (MSZP)	PES	9 / 24
Alliance of Free Democrats (SZDSZ)	ALDE	2 / 24
Democratic Forum (MDF)	EPP–ED	1 / 24

== See also ==
- Members of the European Parliament 2004–09 – List by country
- List of members of the European Parliament, 2004–09 – Full alphabetical list
- 2004 European Parliament election in Hungary
- 2004 European Parliament election
- Parliamentary Groups
