= List of observers to the European Parliament for Hungary, 2003–2004 =

Members of the European Parliament for Hungary
Observers	(2003)
Delegation	(2004)
6th term	(2004)
7th term	(2009)
8th term	(2014)
9th term	(2019)
10th term	(2024)

This is a list of the 24 observers to the European Parliament for Hungary in the 1999 to 2004 session. They were appointed by the Hungarian Parliament as observers from 1 May 2003 until the accession of Hungary to the EU on 1 May 2004.

== List ==
Name	National party	EP Group
Zoltán Bagó	Fidesz – Hungarian Civic Alliance (Fidesz)	EPP–ED
József Ékes	Democratic Forum (MDF)	EPP–ED
Szabolcs Fazakas	Socialist Party (MSZP)	PES
Zita Gurmai	Socialist Party (MSZP)	PES
András Gyürk	Fidesz – Hungarian Civic Alliance (Fidesz)	EPP–ED
Gyula Hegyi	Socialist Party (MSZP)	PES
Magda Kósáné Kovács	Socialist Party (MSZP)	PES
Csaba Őry	Fidesz – Hungarian Civic Alliance (Fidesz)	EPP–ED
József Szájer	Fidesz – Hungarian Civic Alliance (Fidesz)	EPP–ED
István Szent-Iványi	Alliance of Free Democrats (SZDSZ)	ELDR
Csaba Tabajdi	Socialist Party (MSZP)	PES

=== Party representation ===
National party	Observers	EP Group
Fidesz – Hungarian Civic Union (Fidesz)	12	EPP–ED
Socialist Party (MSZP)	10	PES
Alliance of Free Democrats (SZDSZ)	2	ALDE
