= List of members of the European Parliament for Hungary, 2014–2019 =

Members of the European Parliament for Hungary
Observers	(2003)
Delegation	(2004)
6th term	(2004)
7th term	(2009)
8th term	(2014)
9th term	(2019)
10th term	(2024)

This is a list of the 21 members of the European Parliament for Hungary elected at the 2014 European Parliament election. They served in the 2014 to 2019 session.

== Elected MEPs ==
Name	National party	EP Group
Zoltán Balczó	Jobbik, the Movement for a Better Hungary (Jobbik)	NI
Andrea Bocskor	Fidesz – Hungarian Civic Alliance (Fidesz)	EPP
Andor Deli	Fidesz – Hungarian Civic Alliance (Fidesz)	EPP
Tamás Deutsch	Fidesz – Hungarian Civic Alliance (Fidesz)	EPP
Norbert Erdős	Fidesz – Hungarian Civic Alliance (Fidesz)	EPP
Kinga Gál	Fidesz – Hungarian Civic Alliance (Fidesz)	EPP
Ildikó Gáll-Pelcz	Fidesz – Hungarian Civic Alliance (Fidesz)	EPP
András Gyürk	Fidesz – Hungarian Civic Alliance (Fidesz)	EPP
György Hölvényi	Christian Democratic People's Party (KDNP)	EPP
Benedek Jávor	Dialogue for Hungary (Párbeszéd)	G–EFA
Ádám Kósa	Fidesz – Hungarian Civic Alliance (Fidesz)	EPP
Béla Kovács	Jobbik, the Movement for a Better Hungary (Jobbik)	NI
Tamás Meszerics	Politics Can Be Different (LMP)	G–EFA
Csaba Molnár	Democratic Coalition (DK)	S&D
Krisztina Morvai	Jobbik, the Movement for a Better Hungary (Jobbik)	NI
Péter Niedermüller	Democratic Coalition (DK)	S&D
György Schöpflin	Fidesz – Hungarian Civic Alliance (Fidesz)	EPP
József Szájer	Fidesz – Hungarian Civic Alliance (Fidesz)	EPP
Tibor Szanyi	Socialist Party (MSZP)	S&D
László Tőkés	Fidesz – Hungarian Civic Alliance (Fidesz)	EPP
István Ujhelyi	Socialist Party (MSZP)	S&D

=== Party representation ===
National party	EP Group	Seats	±
Fidesz – Hungarian Civic Alliance (Fidesz)	EPP	11 / 21	▼2
Jobbik, the Movement for a Better Hungary (Jobbik)	NI	3 / 21	Steady
Socialist Party (MSZP)	S&D	2 / 21	▼2
Democratic Coalition (DK)	S&D	2 / 21	▲2
Christian Democratic People's Party (KDNP)	EPP	1 / 21	Steady
Dialogue for Hungary (Párbeszéd)	G–EFA	1 / 21	▲1
Politics Can Be Different (LMP)	G–EFA	1 / 21	▲1

== Midterm changes ==
- Ildikó Pelczné Gáll became member of the European Court of Auditors, thus resigned on 31 August 2017. She was replaced by Lívia Járóka on 15 September 2017.
- Béla Kovács was expelled from Jobbik in February 2016 according to a party statement. The European Parliament records that he left the Jobbik group on 27 March 2018.
- Krisztina Morvai broke her cooperation with Jobbik on 13 April 2018.
- Tamás Meszerics left Politics Can Be Different (LMP) on 22 October 2018.

== See also ==
- Members of the European Parliament 2014–2019 – List by country
- List of members of the European Parliament, 2014–2019 – Full alphabetical list
- 2014 European Parliament election in Hungary
- 2014 European Parliament election
- Parliamentary Groups
