= List of members of the European Parliament for Hungary, 2024–2029 =

Members of the European Parliament for Hungary
Observers	(2003)
Delegation	(2004)
6th term	(2004)
7th term	(2009)
8th term	(2014)
9th term	(2019)
10th term	(2024)

This is a list of the 21 members of the European Parliament for Hungary in the 2024 to 2029 session. The members were elected in the 2024 European Parliament election in Hungary.

== List ==
Name	National party	EP Group	Member since	Ref.
Tamás Deutsch	Fidesz	PfE	16 July 2024	
Kinga Gál	Fidesz	PfE	16 July 2024	
András Gyürk	Fidesz	PfE	16 July 2024	
Csaba Dömötör (Note: Replaced Balázs Győrffy after his resignation.)	Fidesz	PfE	22 September 2024	
Balázs Orbán (Note: Replaced Pál Szekeres after his resignation.)	Fidesz	PfE	18 September 2026	
Viktória Ferenc	Fidesz	PfE	16 July 2024	
Annamária Vicsek	Fidesz	PfE	16 July 2024	
Enikő Győri	Fidesz	PfE	16 July 2024	
András László	Fidesz	PfE	16 July 2024	
Ernő Schaller-Baross	Fidesz	PfE	16 July 2024	
György Hölvényi	Christian Democratic People's Party (KDNP)	PfE	16 July 2024	
Csaba Bogdán (Note: Replaced Péter Magyar after his resignation.)	Tisza Party	EPP	22 May 2026	
Dóra Dávid	Tisza Party	EPP	16 July 2024	
András Kulja	Tisza Party	EPP	16 July 2024	
Eszter Lakos	Tisza Party	EPP	16 July 2024	
Gabriella Gerzsenyi	Tisza Party	EPP	16 July 2024	
Kinga Kollár	Tisza Party	EPP	16 July 2024	
Viktor Weisz (Note: Replaced Zoltán Tarr after his resignation.)	Tisza Party	EPP	22 May 2026	
Klára Dobrev	Democratic Coalition (DK)	S&D	16 July 2024	
Csaba Molnár	Democratic Coalition (DK)	S&D	16 July 2024	
Zsuzsanna Borvendég	Our Homeland Movement (MH)	ESN	16 July 2024	

== Replaced members ==
Name	National party	Member since	Member until	Notes	Ref.
Balázs Győrffy	Independent	16 July 2024	1 September 2024	Resigned from Fidesz and his mandate.	
Péter Magyar	Tisza	16 July 2024	9 May 2026	Resigned as members-elect of the National Assembly.	
Zoltán Tarr	Tisza	16 July 2024	9 May 2026	Resigned as members-elect of the National Assembly.	
Pál Szekeres	Fidesz	16 July 2024	13 September 2026	Resigned to join the National Assembly.	
