= List of members of the European Parliament for Hungary, 2019–2024 =

Members of the European Parliament for Hungary
Observers	(2003)
Delegation	(2004)
6th term	(2004)
7th term	(2009)
8th term	(2014)
9th term	(2019)
10th term	(2024)

This is a list of the 21 members of the European Parliament for Hungary elected at the 2019 European Parliament election. They serve in the 2019 to 2024 session.

== Elected MEPs ==
Name	National Party	EP Group
László Trócsányi	Fidesz	EPP
József Szájer	Fidesz	EPP
Lívia Járóka	Fidesz	EPP
Tamás Deutsch	Fidesz	EPP
András Gyürk	Fidesz	EPP
Kinga Gál	Fidesz	EPP
Enikő Győri	Fidesz	EPP
Ádám Kósa	Fidesz	EPP
Andrea Bocskor	Fidesz	EPP
Andor Deli	Fidesz	EPP
Balázs Hidvéghi	Fidesz	EPP
György Hölvényi	Christian Democratic People's Party (KDNP)	EPP
Klára Dobrev	Democratic Coalition (DK)	S&D
Csaba Molnár	Democratic Coalition (DK)	S&D
Sándor Rónai	Democratic Coalition (DK)	S&D
Attila Ara-Kovács	Democratic Coalition (DK)	S&D
István Ujhelyi	Hungarian Socialist Party (MSZP)	S&D
Katalin Cseh	Momentum Movement (MoMo)	ALDE
Anna Júlia Donáth	Momentum Movement (MoMo)	ALDE
