= 2009 European Parliament election in Hungary =

- 7 June 2009

All 22 seats of Hungary in the European Parliament
- Turnout: 36%
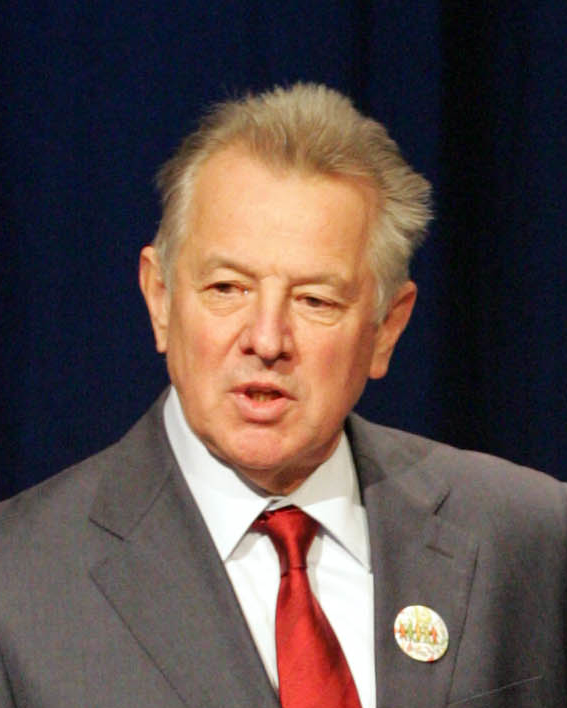

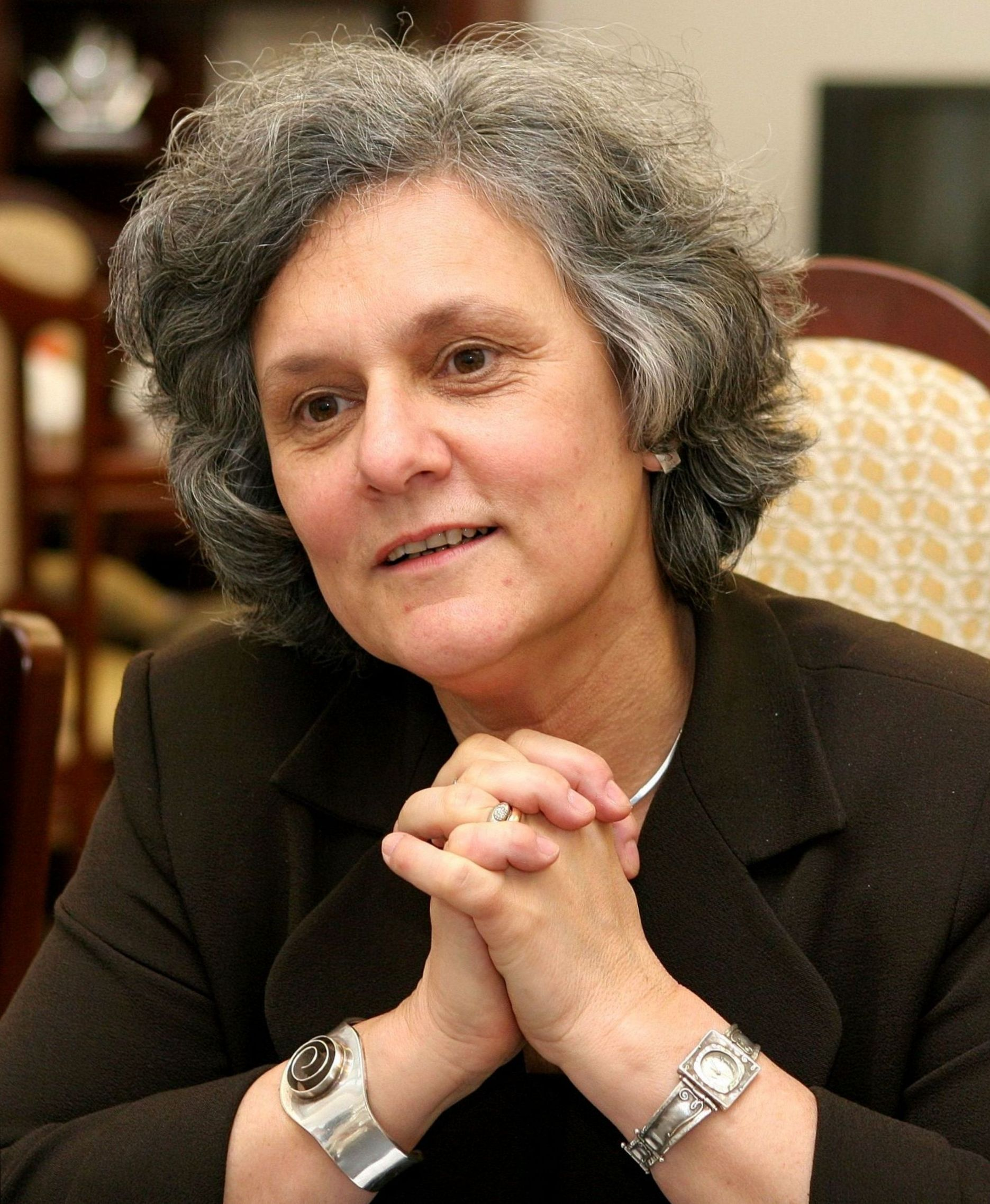

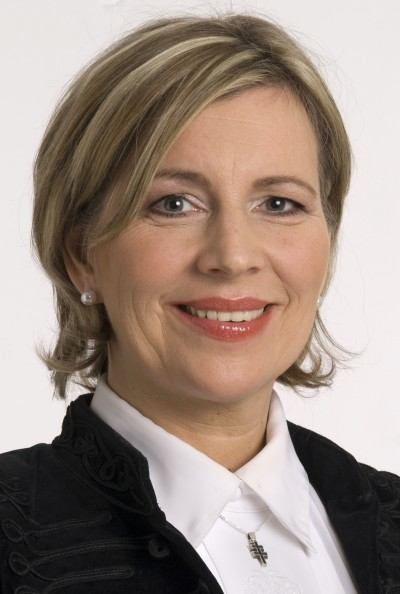

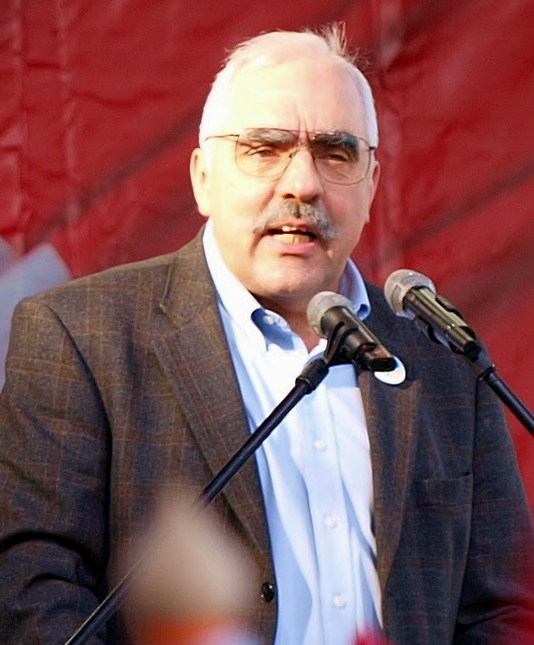
	Majority party	Minority party
Leader	Pál Schmitt	Kinga Göncz
Party	Fidesz–KDNP	MSZP
Alliance	EPP	S&D
Last election	12	9
Seats won	14	4
Seat change	▲2	▼5
Popular vote	1,632,309	503,140
Percentage	56.37%	17.37%
	Third party	Fourth party
Leader	Krisztina Morvai	Lajos Bokros
Party	Jobbik	MDF
Alliance	NI	ECR
Last election	0	1
Seats won	3	1
Seat change	▲3	0
Popular vote	427,773	153,660
Percentage	14.77%	5.31%

An election of Members of the European Parliament from Hungary to the European Parliament was held in 2009. Hungary delegated 22 members to the European Parliament based on the Nice treaty and the election took place on 7 June.

== Candidates ==
Among the candidates that ran were:

- Pál Schmitt, József Szájer, Kinga Gál, János Áder, László Surján, Lívia Járóka, András Gyürk, Béla Glattfelder, Ádám Kósa, Ágnes Hankiss for Fidesz – Hungarian Civic Union
- Kinga Göncz, Edit Herczog, Zita Gurmai, Csaba Sándor Tabajdi, Gyula Hegyi, Szabolcs Fazekas, Gyula Cserei, Mihály Kökény, Gábor Harangozó for the Hungarian Socialist Party
- Lajos Bokros, György Habsburg, Szabolcs Joó, Ibolya Dávid for the Hungarian Democratic Forum
- István Szent-Iványi, Gabriella Béki, Gábor Demszky, György Konrád for the Alliance of Free Democrats
- Krisztina Morvai, Zoltán Balczó, Csanád Szegedi, Judit Szima, Gábor Vona for Jobbik – Movement for a Better Hungary

== Election ==
The election in Hungary took place according to the 2003 CXIII. law about European election and the 1997 C. election law. According to this the country consists of a single election district and those parties will be put on the ballot who could collect 20,000 proposal coupons. Eight qualified lists were approved by Hungarian authorities to be put on the ballot, of which two of them were shared lists. Fidesz shared its party list with the Christian Democratic People's Party (KDNP) to create a joint Fidesz-KDNP list, and Politics Can Be Different shared its party list with the Humanist Party to create a joint LMP-HP list.

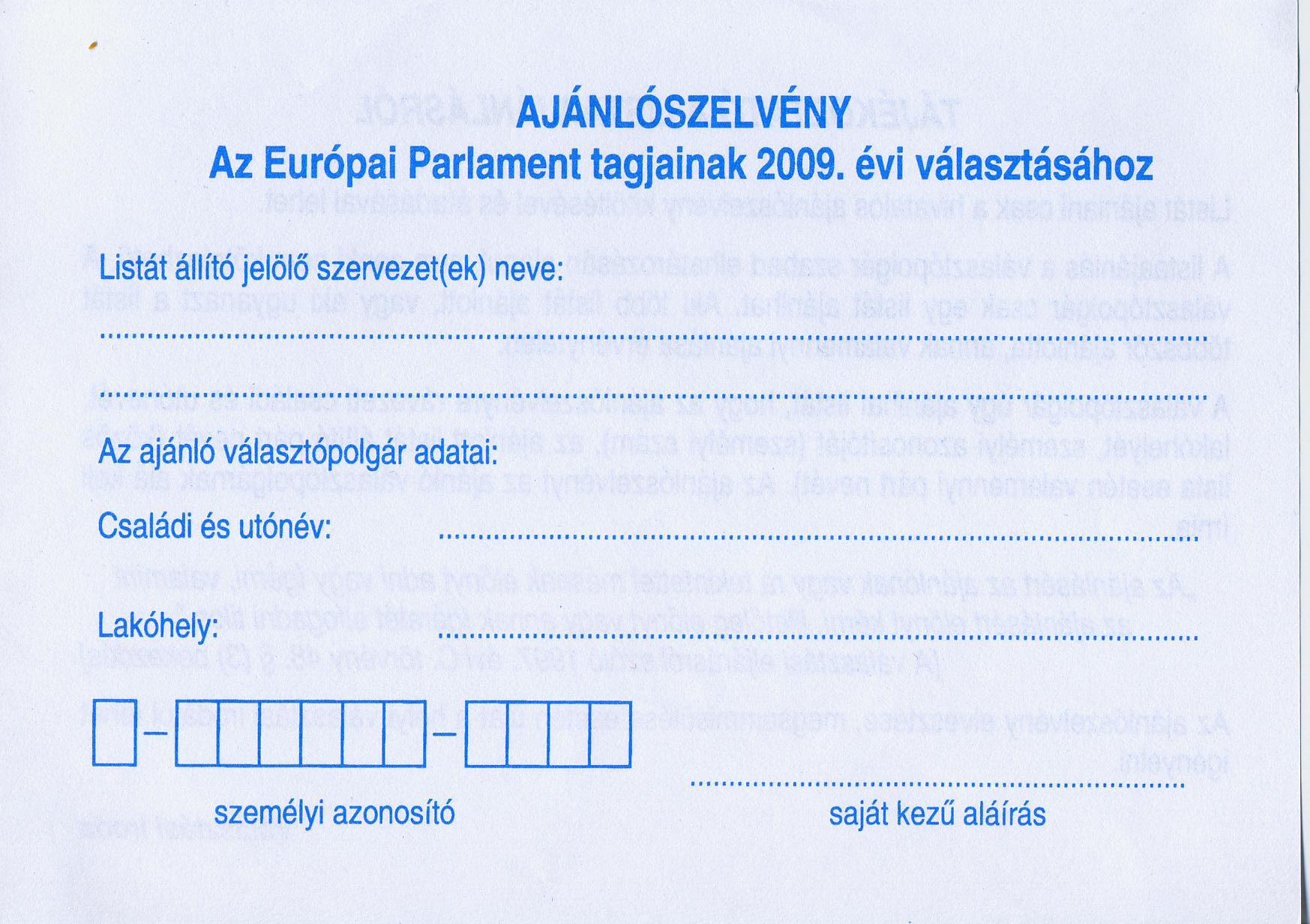
Hungarian Proposal coupon used in the 2009 election

== Opinion polls ==
Source	Date	Fidesz–KDNP	MSZP	SZDSZ	MDF	Jobbik	others
Medián	25 February 2009	63%	25%	4%	2%	4%	2%
Medián	18 March 2009	66%	23%	2%	4%	4%	1%
Tárki	30 March 2009	62%	23%	3%	3%	4%	5%
Marketing Centrum	30 March 2009	61%	25%	3%	4%	5%	2%
Progresszív Intézet	13 April 2009	62%	25%	3%	5%	3%	2%
Medián	15 April 2009	70%	18%	2%	2%	4%	4%
Századvég-Forsense	21 April 2009	70%	18%	2%	1%	5%	4%
Forsense	27 April 2009	63%	27%	2%	2%	6%	1%
Tárki	29 April 2009	64%	22%	4%	2%	4%	4%
Gallup	8 May 2009	68%	21%	1%	2%	5%	3%
Századvég-Forsense	26 May 2009	71%	17%	1%	2%	6%	3%
Nézőpont	27 May 2009	66%	14%	4%	6%	7%	3%
Tárki	27 May 2009	70%	17%	3%	1%	4%	5%
Szonda Ipsos	28 May 2009	67%	21%	2%	3%	4%	3%
Marketing Centrum	1 June 2009	61%	19%	5%	4%	8%	5%
Medián	3 June 2009	60%	21%	4%	4%	7%	4%

== Results ==
The European Parliament elections' biggest winners were the centre-right opposition Fidesz party, which won 56% of the vote and 14 seats. The far-right Jobbik ("For a Better Hungary") party also performed stronger than expected. The Hungarian Democratic Forum also gained one seat, so the former finance minister Lajos Bokros could travel to Brussels.

The liberal Alliance of Free Democrats (SZDSZ) was almost wiped off the political map, attracting only 60,000 votes or 2%, compared to more than a million in the country's first free elections 19 years ago.

Party	Votes	%	Seats	+/–
Fidesz–KDNP	1,632,309	56.36	14	+2
Hungarian Socialist Party	503,140	17.37	4	–5
Jobbik	427,773	14.77	3	New
Hungarian Democratic Forum	153,660	5.31	1	0
Politics Can Be Different–Humanist Party	75,522	2.61	0	New
Alliance of Free Democrats	62,527	2.16	0	–2
Hungarian Workers' Party	27,817	0.96	0	0
Romani Alliance Party	13,431	0.46	0	New
Total	2,896,179	100.00	22	–2
Valid votes	2,896,179	99.15		
Invalid/blank votes	24,769	0.85		
Total votes	2,920,948	100.00		
Registered voters/turnout	8,046,086	36.30		
Source: Valasztas.hu

=== By county ===
County	Fidesz–KDNP	MSZP	Jobbik	MDF	LMP–HP	SZDSZ	Munkáspárt	MCF
Bács-Kiskun	65.34	13.30	12.41	4.40	1.65	1.49	0.83	0.58
Baranya	59.94	18.21	10.70	5.29	2.55	1.68	0.94	0.69
Békés	57.07	17.02	16.56	4.58	1.60	1.34	1.49	0.35
Borsod-Abaúj-Zemplén	49.11	19.30	22.88	4.05	1.54	1.15	1.23	0.75
Budapest	48.12	22.30	12.59	6.54	4.88	4.46	0.93	0.17
Csongrád	58.32	17.64	12.53	5.90	2.46	1.78	1.21	0.15
Fejér	58.73	16.79	13.90	5.48	2.35	1.69	0.91	0.16
Győr-Moson-Sopron	64.48	14.34	11.75	5.44	1.89	1.32	0.65	0.13
Hajdú-Bihar	60.63	12.58	17.10	5.25	1.96	1.15	0.93	0.39
Heves	50.06	19.23	20.17	4.74	1.75	1.67	1.19	1.20
Jász-Nagykun-Szolnok	53.35	17.76	19.02	4.76	1.65	1.42	1.73	0.32
Komárom-Esztergom	55.43	21.02	12.53	5.74	2.05	1.88	1.07	0.28
Nógrád	54.04	17.70	18.68	4.36	1.39	1.21	1.88	0.73
Pest	56.71	15.03	16.63	5.43	2.98	2.20	0.73	0.29
Somogy	64.34	16.51	10.94	4.18	1.58	1.25	0.85	0.34
Szabolcs-Szatmár-Bereg	57.36	14.15	18.49	4.18	1.14	1.04	0.86	2.77
Tolna	64.38	15.34	11.68	4.76	1.53	1.25	0.71	0.34
Vas	68.37	13.31	9.25	4.96	1.78	1.66	0.53	0.13
Veszprém	60.11	16.41	13.44	5.34	2.20	1.59	0.77	0.14
Zala	63.13	14.63	12.94	5.15	1.60	1.52	0.70	0.33
Foreign representations	50.45	11.90	15.40	6.34	9.84	5.83	0.03	0.21
Total	56.36	17.37	14.77	5.31	2.61	2.16	0.96	0.46

== List of seat winners ==
On the Fidesz-KDNP Party list:

1. Pál Schmitt
2. József Szájer
3. Kinga Gál
4. János Áder
5. László Surján
6. Tamás Deutsch
7. Lívia Járóka
8. György Schöpflin
9. András Gyürk
10. Csaba Őry
11. Béla Glattfelder
12. Ádám Kósa
13. Ágnes Hankiss
14. Enikő Győri

On the Hungarian Socialist Party list:

1. Kinga Göncz
2. Edit Herczog
3. Zita Gurmai
4. Csaba Tabajdi

On the Jobbik Party list:

1. Krisztina Morvai
2. Zoltán Balczó
3. Csanád Szegedi

On the Hungarian Democratic Forum Party list:

1. Lajos Bokros

== Consequences ==
Alliance of Free Democrats Party leader Gábor Fodor announced that he will offer his resignation in case his party will not reach the 5% limit needed for representation in the European Parliament (the same limit is applied in national elections). After the election results were published Fodor repeated his statement promising to offer his resignation to the party congress the following day. The election result ultimately caused mass resignations including Fodor in the leadership of SZDSZ and internal turmoil in the party. The election results prompted an intense debate about the future of the party in MSZP as well.

== See also ==
- List of political parties in Hungary
- MEPs for Hungary 2004–09
- MEPs for Hungary 2009–14
