= Hankiss =

Hankiss is a surname of Hungarian origin. Notable people with the surname include:

- Ágnes Hankiss (1950–2021), Hungarian politician
- Elemér Hankiss (1928–2015), Hungarian sociologist

== See also ==
- Hankins
