= Tamás Meszerics =

Hungarian politician

Tamás Meszerics MEP
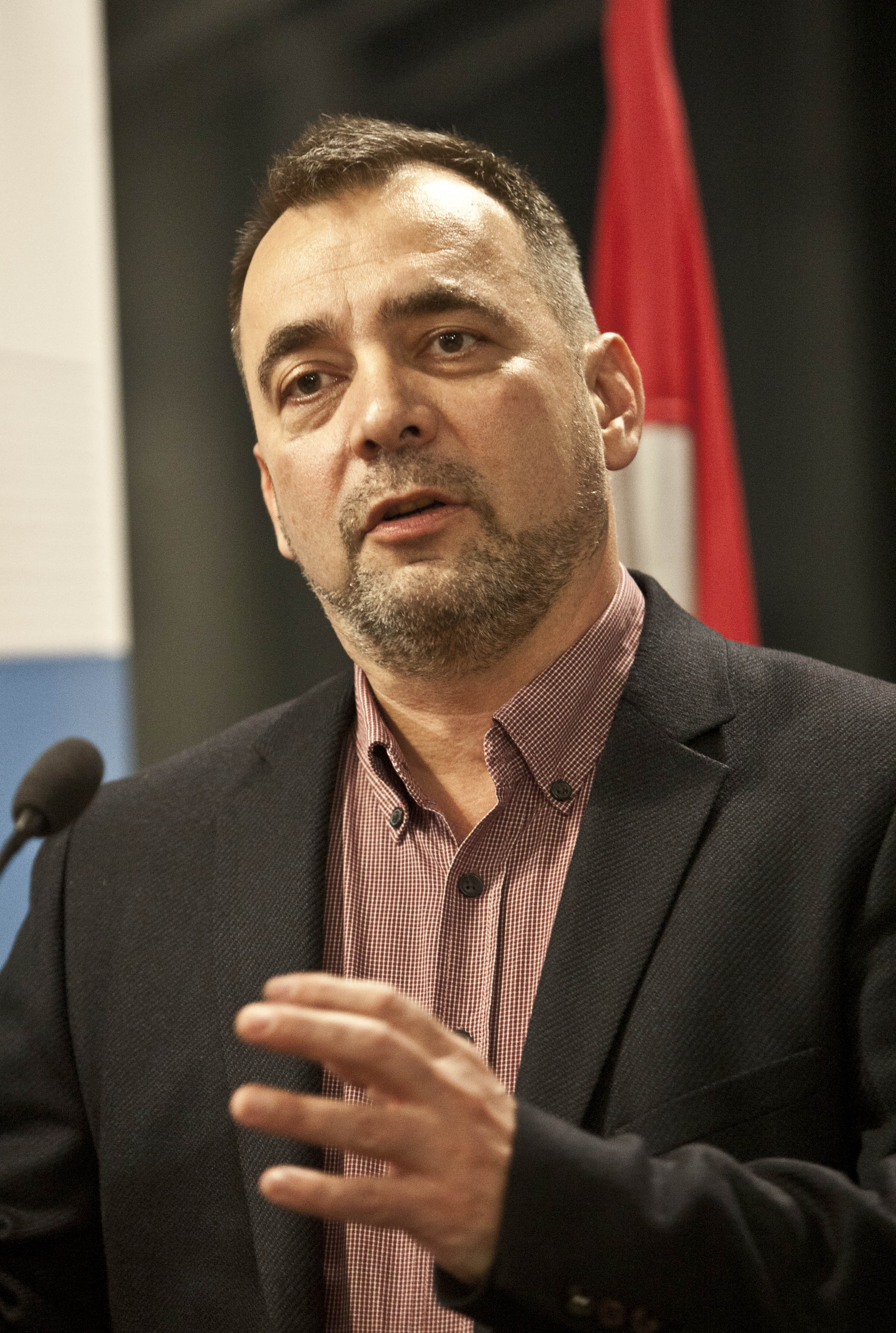

Member of the European Parliament
- In office 25 May 2014 – 1 July 2019
- Constituency: Hungary

Personal details
- Born: 4 December 1964 (age 61) Győr, Hungary
- Party: Hungarian: Politics Can Be Different (2009–2018); EU: European Green Party
- Education: Harvard University; Central European University; University of Budapest; George Mason University

Tamás Meszerics (Hungarian pronunciation: [ˈtɒmaːʃ ˈmɛsɛrit͡ʃ]; born 4 December 1964) is a Hungarian politician and Member of the European Parliament (MEP) from Hungary. He was elected as a member of the Politics Can Be Different, part of the European Green Party in 2014. He joined The Greens–European Free Alliance group.

== Biography ==
Meszerics studied at the Faculty of Arts at Loránd Eötvös University in Budapest where he earned his Master of Arts in history and English Studies in 1990. After graduation he was a fellow at the Institute for International Studies at the University of Leeds and at the George Mason University. Beginning with 1992 he became a program coordinator, in 1995 a research assistant at the Political Science Department of the Central European University. Meszerics earned his PhD degree in contemporary history at his alma mater about Anglo-American foreign policy in 2000.

Meszerics was appointed assistant professor in 2002. In 2011 he was a visiting scholar at the Minda de Gunzburg Center for European Studies of the Harvard University. His fields of interest are theories of democracy, historical and theoretical studies of intelligence, bureaucracy, bureaucratic politics and their theories, the history of modern Central European countries and behavioral game theory.

=== Political career ===
Meszerics joined the Alliance of Free Democrats in the wake of the end of communism in Hungary but did not hold any offices. He left the party in 1995 but returned to politics in 2009 when he was a founding member of the new green party Politics Can Be Different (LMP). Between 2009 and 2010 he was secretary of the party board and was later co-chair of the party's political council. After the successful 2010 general election where the party managed to get parliamentary representation he worked as a foreign policy expert for the parliamentary group. In 2013 he returned to the party board as a member. He held his office until the 2014 European Parliament election where he headed the party list.

As the party surpassed the threshold of 5%, Meszerics was elected as a Member of the European Parliament where he automatically joined The Greens–European Free Alliance group. The group elected him as co-coordinator of foreign policy. He was a member of the Committee on Foreign Affairs and substitute member of the Committee on Employment and Social Affairs.

On 22 October 2018, Tamás Meszerics announced his decision to leave the LMP party.

== Other activities ==
- European Council on Foreign Relations (ECFR), Member
- European Endowment for Democracy (EED), Member of the Board of Governors

== Sources ==
- Personal profile of Tamás Meszerics in the European Parliament's database of members
- CV at the Central European University
- VoteWatch profile
- Short CV at Harvard University
