= Civil Movement =

Civil Movement Civil Mozgalom
- President: Mária Seres
- Founded: 24 April 2009
- Headquarters: 4400 Nyíregyháza, Csalló köz 20.
- Ideology: Third Way
- Political position: Centre-right
- Colours: Green
- National Assembly: 0 / 199
- European Parliament: 0 / 21

Website
- seresmaria.hu

The Civil Movement (Hungarian: Civil Mozgalom, pronounced [ˈt͡sivil ˈmozɡɒlom]), abbreviated to CM, is a centre-right political party in Hungary, led by Mária Seres. It has a third way ideology. The party ran in the 2014 parliamentary election under the banner Alliance of Mária Seres (Hungarian: Seres Mária Szövetségesei), abbreviated to SMS.

== Background ==
In the Summer of 2008 Mária Seres initiated a referendum drive on MPs’ expenses garners. At least 525,000 verified signatures have been collected, far more than the mandatory 200,000, in support of a referendum on MPs’ expenses, National Election Office head Emília Rytkó announced on 19 March 2009. Seres told reporters later that day that this was the first time that an individual managed to collect so many signatures for a referendum.

== Election results ==
During the 2010 Hungarian parliamentary election six parties have gained the right to set up a national list, as the Civil Movement has joined the five parties announced earlier by the National Election Office (OVI). The CM gained prominence by gathering signatures for a referendum on curtailing MPs’ expense accounts. The party was able to register seven regional lists.

For the Hungarian Parliament:

Election year	National Assembly				Government
Election year	# of overall votes	% of overall vote	# of overall seats won	+/–	Government
2010	45,863	0.89% (#6)	0 / 386		extra-parliamentary
2014	22,219	0.44% (#7)	0 / 199	0	extra-parliamentary
2018	35	0.0%	0 / 199	0	extra-parliamentary

For the European Parliament:

Election year	# of overall votes	% of overall vote	# of overall seats won	+/-	Notes
2014	9,279	0.40% (#8)	0 / 21		
