= 2014 European Parliament election in Hungary =

- 25 May 2014

All 21 Hungarian seats to the European Parliament
- Turnout: 28.97%
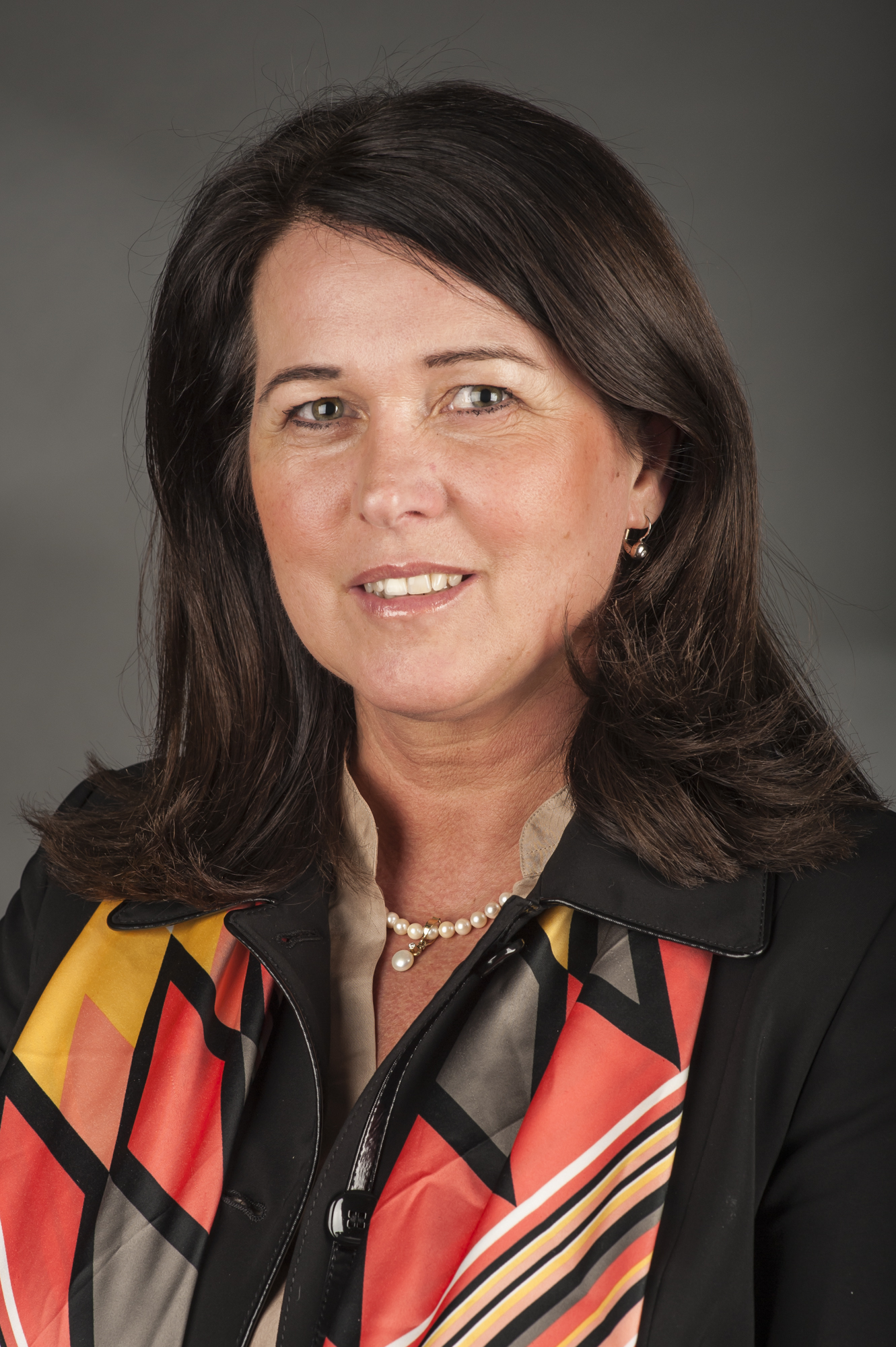

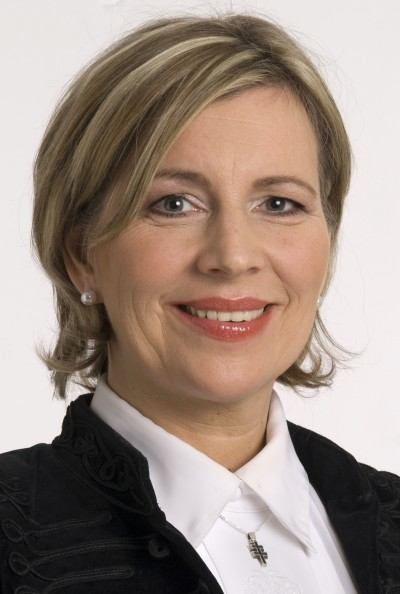

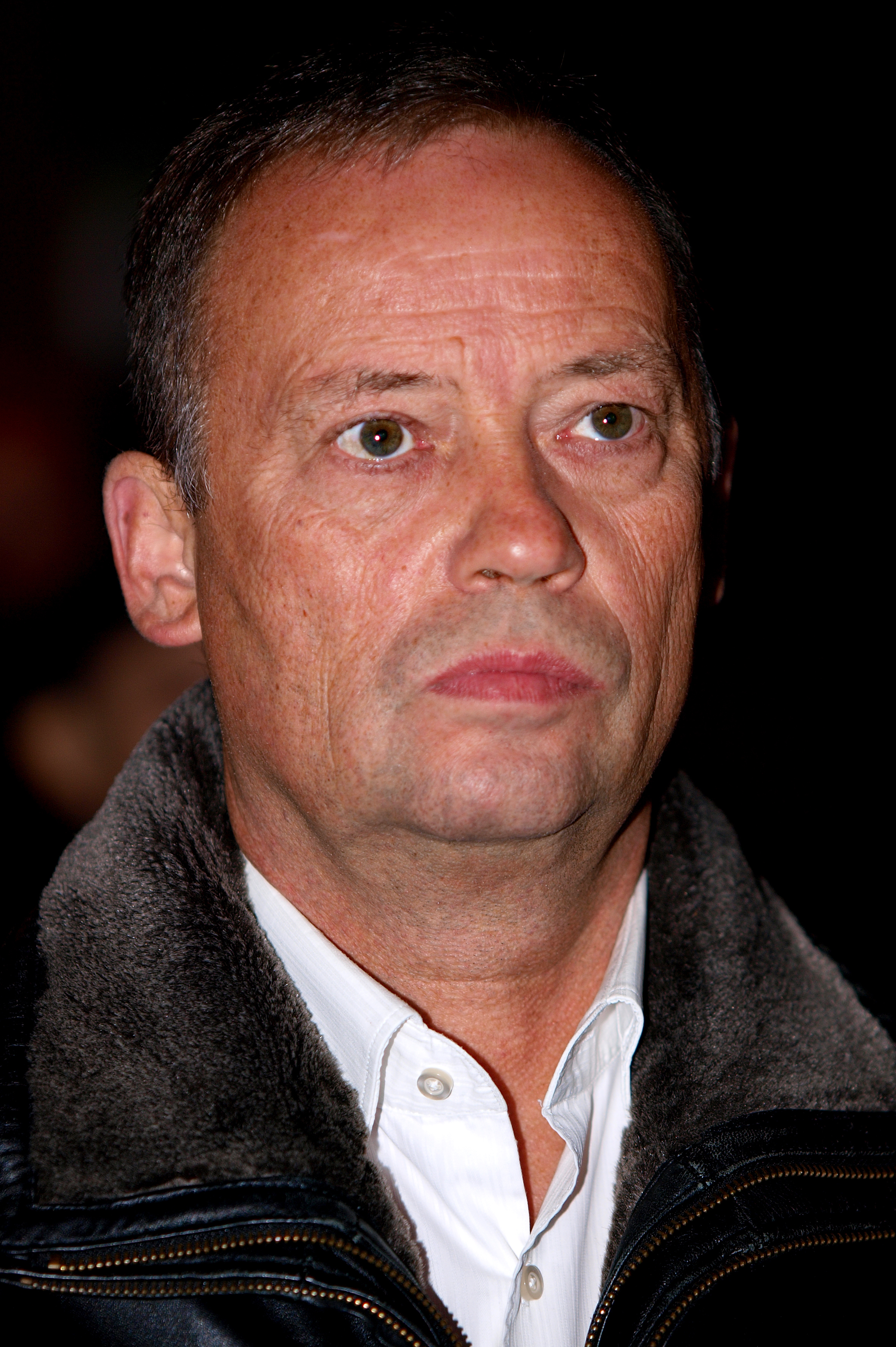

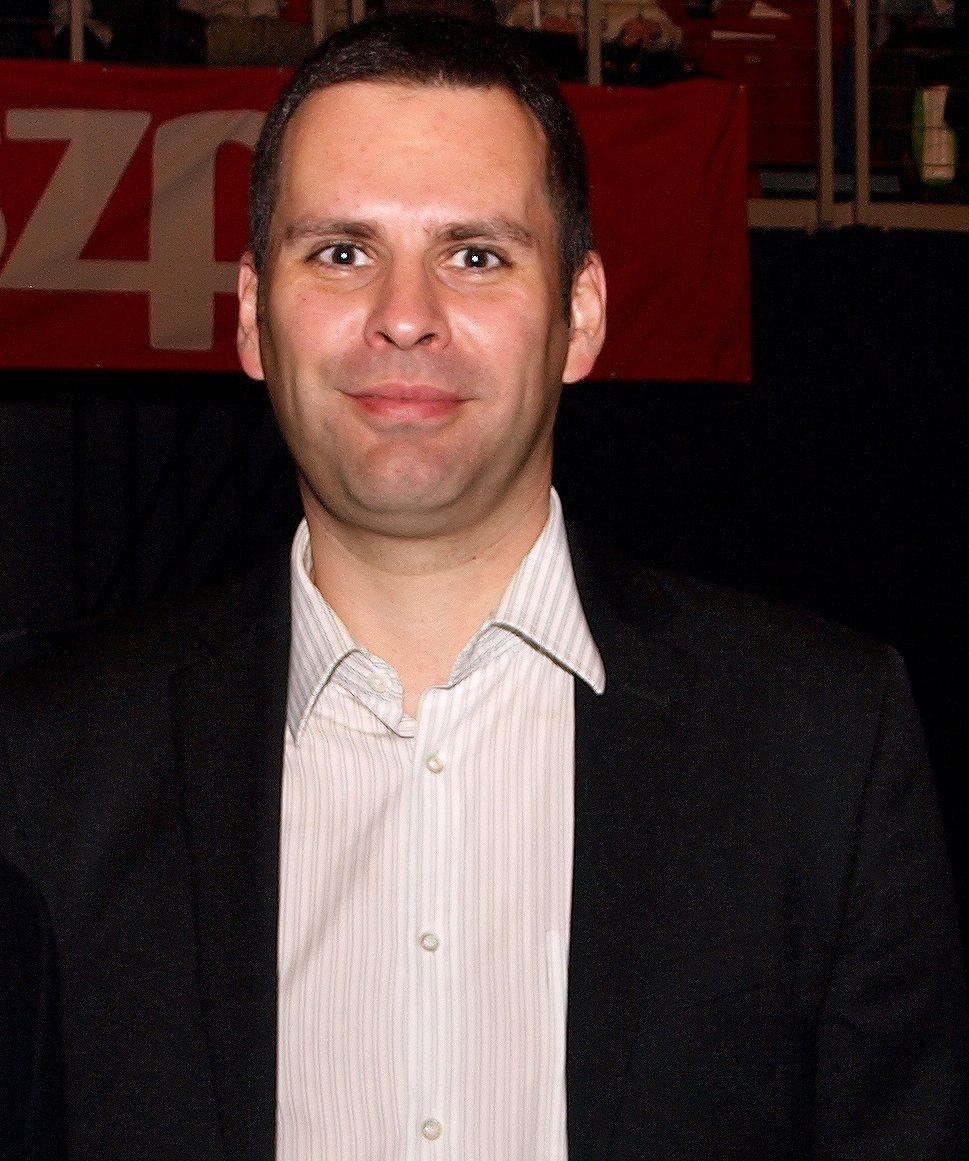

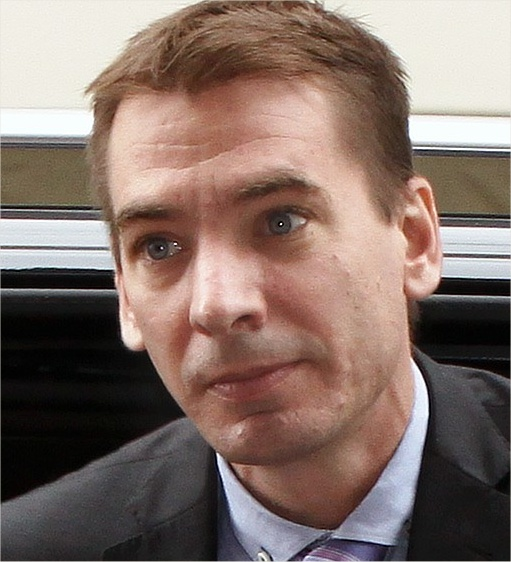

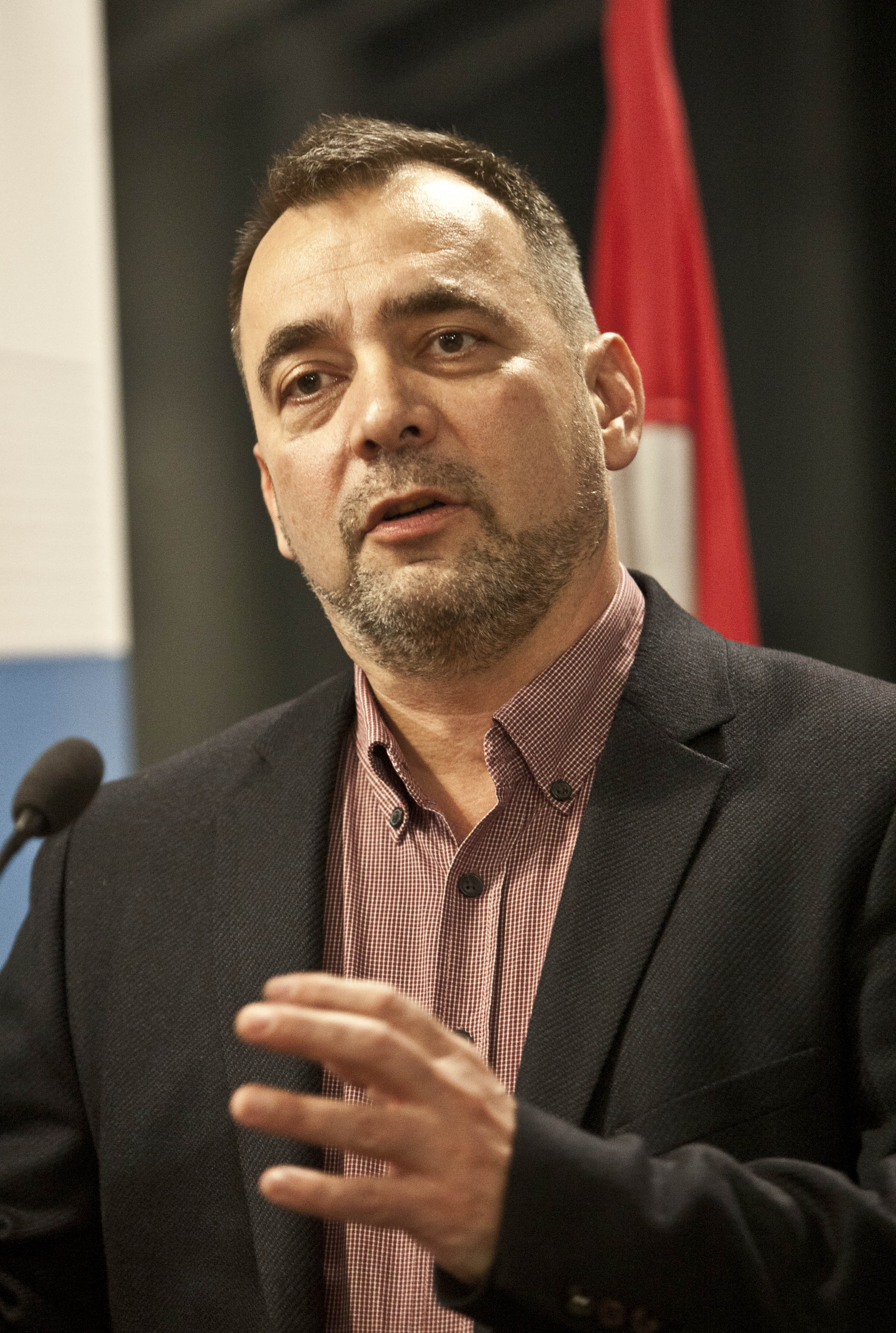
	Majority party	Minority party	Third party
Leader	Ildikó Pelczné Gáll	Krisztina Morvai	Tibor Szanyi
Party	Fidesz–KDNP	Jobbik	MSZP
Alliance	EPP	NI	S&D
Last election	14 seats, 56.37%	3 seats, 14.77%	4 seats, 17.37%
Seats won	12	3	2
Seat change	▼2	Steady	▼2
Popular vote	1,193,991	340,287	252,751
Percentage	51.48%	14.67%	10.9%
	Fourth party	Fifth party	Sixth party
Leader	Csaba Molnár	Benedek Jávor	Tamás Meszerics
Party	DK	Együtt–PM	LMP
Alliance	S&D	Greens/EFA	Greens/EFA
Last election	New party	New party	0 seats, 2.61%
Seats won	2	1	1
Seat change	New party	New party	▲1
Popular vote	226,086	168,076	116,904
Percentage	9.75%	7.25%	5.04%

An election of Members of the European Parliament from Hungary to the European Parliament was held on 25 May 2014.

With the Lisbon Treaty coming into force, Hungary held 22 seats in the European Parliament. However, because Croatia joined the EU in 2013, it now holds 21 seats to the Parliament.

== Parties contesting the election ==
Eight Hungarian parties took part in the European elections:

- MSZP – Magyar Szocialista Párt (Hungarian Socialist Party)
- SMS – Seres Mária Szövetségei (Alliance of Mária Seres)
- Fidesz–KDNP – Fidesz-Magyar Polgári Szövetség – Kereszténydemokrata Néppárt (Fidesz–Hungarian Civic Alliance – Christian Democratic People's Party)
- HNEM – A Haza Nem Eladó Mozgalom Párt) (The Homeland Not For Sale Movement Party)
- Jobbik – Jobbik Magyarországért Mozgalom (Movement for a Better Hungary)
- LMP – Lehet Más a Politika (Politics Can Be Different)
- Együtt–PM – Együtt-A Korszakváltók Pártja – Párbeszéd Magyarországért Párt (Together–Party for a New Era – Dialogue for Hungary)
- DK – Demokratikus Koalíció (Democratic Coalition)

Three parties were refused registration: Democratic Community of Welfare and Freedom (JESZ), Modern Hungary Movement (MoMa), and New Hungary Party (ÚMP).

== Opinion polling ==
Date	Polling Firm	Fidesz–KDNP	MSZP	Jobbik	LMP	Együtt-PM	DK	Others	Lead
7 June 2009	2009 election	14	4	3	0	–	–	1	10
August 2013	Policy Solutions	10	6	4	–	1	–	–	4
9–29 January 2014	Ipsos–Tárki–Medián	10	4	3	–	2	2	–	6
6 April 2014	PollWatch2014	10	5	5	1	–	–	–	5
24 April 2014	Political Capital	11	4	5	1	–	–	–	6
25–29 April 2014	Medián	14	3	4	–	–	–	–	10
6–8 May 2014	Nézőpont	11	3	3	2	2	–	–	8
May 2014	Ipsos	13	4	4	–	–	–	–	9
7–15 May 2014	Tárki	13	4	3	–	–	1	–	9
14–18 May 2014	Nézőpont	11	4	3	1	1	1	–	7

== Results ==
Party	Votes	%	Seats	+/–
Fidesz–KDNP	1,193,991	51.48	12	–2
Jobbik	340,287	14.67	3	0
Hungarian Socialist Party	252,751	10.90	2	–2
Democratic Coalition	226,086	9.75	2	New
Together 2014–Dialogue for Hungary	168,076	7.25	1	New
Politics Can Be Different	116,904	5.04	1	+1
Homeland Not For Sale Movement	12,119	0.52	0	New
Alliance of Mária Seres	9,279	0.40	0	New
Total	2,319,493	100.00	21	–1
Valid votes	2,319,493	99.61		
Invalid/blank votes	9,046	0.39		
Total votes	2,328,539	100.00		
Registered voters/turnout	8,041,386	28.96		
Source: Valasztas.hu

=== By county and in the diaspora ===
County	Fidesz–KDNP	Jobbik	MSZP	DK	Együtt-PM	LMP	HNEM	SMS
Bács-Kiskun	59.54	14.86	8.50	7.39	4.99	3.89	0.47	0.37
Baranya	50.91	13.89	11.00	10.57	7.06	5.42	0.79	0.37
Békés	52.43	17.08	11.55	8.54	4.52	3.79	1.66	0.43
Borsod-Abaúj-Zemplén	48.49	20.91	13.24	9.11	4.57	2.77	0.47	0.43
Budapest	43.75	9.94	11.50	13.10	13.07	7.93	0.34	0.37
Csongrád	48.94	13.84	16.71	8.07	5.97	5.33	0.66	0.47
Fejér	54.83	14.94	9.17	9.54	5.97	4.54	0.48	0.53
Győr-Moson-Sopron	60.53	12.60	8.69	8.12	4.95	4.40	0.31	0.41
Hajdú-Bihar	55.52	17.82	8.98	7.90	4.48	4.21	0.66	0.43
Heves	47.26	22.88	11.27	9.30	5.15	3.38	0.43	0.33
Jász-Nagykun-Szolnok	50.99	20.48	11.65	8.14	4.19	3.55	0.61	0.39
Komárom-Esztergom	51.41	13.81	11.65	11.63	6.02	4.51	0.62	0.36
Nógrád	51.15	17.91	12.69	9.52	4.43	2.94	0.70	0.65
Pest	52.62	14.64	8.41	9.95	7.88	5.56	0.57	0.37
Somogy	54.70	15.36	10.37	9.61	5.37	3.74	0.50	0.35
Szabolcs-Szatmár-Bereg	56.63	16.71	14.55	5.85	3.16	2.16	0.43	0.50
Tolna	55.82	15.69	11.02	8.52	4.47	3.58	0.59	0.31
Vas	61.28	12.50	9.51	6.88	4.90	4.23	0.33	0.37
Veszprém	55.18	14.23	10.81	8.75	5.93	4.24	0.48	0.37
Zala	55.36	17.09	9.11	8.50	5.41	3.70	0.47	0.37
Foreign representations	45.36	12.61	4.12	5.20	17.07	15.19	0.19	0.26
Total	51.48	14.67	10.90	9.75	7.25	5.04	0.52	0.40

=== Analysis and consequences ===
Fidesz won with second highest proportion of votes in Europe, after the Labour Party in Malta. Prime Minister Viktor Orbán congratulated to all elected MEPs. He said "they will be outpost of the Hungarians as they will defend the home in foreign land". The ruling party received 12 seats, strongly enhancing the European People's Party (EPP) drive to achieve a majority in the European Parliament. Martin Schulz, S&D candidate for President of the European Commission, said the People's Party could win the election just because of the "eurosceptic and populist" Forza Italia and Fidesz results, which is "embarrassing for the conservatives". German Vice-Chancellor Sigmar Gabriel also called the Fidesz "extremist". Deputy Prime Minister Zsolt Semjén rejected Gabriel's statements and noted "he does not remember that Gabriel had spoken against when Robert Fico's Smer entered into a coalition with the fascist Ján Slota-led Slovak National Party".

The Hungarian Socialist Party (MSZP) suffered its largest defeat since the 1990 parliamentary election, while far-right Jobbik came to the second place for the first time since its establishment. Gábor Vona said his party, based on the results, could be the main challenger to the Fidesz in the 2018 parliamentary election. However, as political analyst Zoltán Lakner argued, Jobbik appeared in the election significantly worse than one month ago in the general election, because the party now gained only one-third of those votes, while the turnout was half of the previous one. The extremist party's second place was due to the fragmentation of the left-wing opposition.

After the obvious failure, chairman Attila Mesterházy and the entire presidium of the Socialist Party tendered their resignation. Nevertheless, Mesterházy said he wishes to keep his position of parliamentary group leader. However, three days later, Mesterházy resigned from both of his positions after criticism intensified against him. The Socialist Party lost its leading opposition stature in Budapest, dropping to fourth place there after the Democratic Coalition and the alliance of Together 2014–Dialogue for Hungary. That rearrangement of the balance of power may affect the distribution of the candidates among the three parties for the 2014 local elections (primarily a possible joint candidate against Mayor of Budapest István Tarlós). Gábor Török, a popular political scientist in Hungary, called the election the "Mohács disaster of the Socialist Party".

The two newer organisations, led by two former prime ministers, Ferenc Gyurcsány and Gordon Bajnai, could assess their strength for the first time during a single candidacy. According to Index.hu, successful results helped the political survival of Gyurcsány and Bajnai. The latter's party proved popular among the liberal voters in Budapest, while the DK weakened the Socialists' stronghold in countryside. However, the news portals' analysis pointed out that Gyurcsány's party has no more reserves, the relative good result was due to the dedicated "believers" and maximum mobilisation coupled with low turnout. According to the analysis, Politics Can Be Different (LMP) remained a party with 5%, narrowly meeting the electoral threshold.

== List of seat winners ==
On the Fidesz–KDNP list:

1. Ildikó Pelczné Gáll
2. József Szájer
3. László Tőkés
4. Tamás Deutsch
5. András Gyürk
6. Kinga Gál
7. György Schöpflin
8. Norbert Erdős
9. Andrea Bocskor (Note: Andrea Bocskor holds besides her Hungarian citizenship also Ukrainian citizenship (this practice is quite common among the Hungarian minority in Ukraine, although at the time of her election Ukrainian law did not recognise dual citizenship). Hence, she became the first elected Ukrainian in the European Parliament. Bocskor lives in Ukraine; in the city Berehove.)
10. Andor Deli
11. Ádám Kósa
12. György Hölvényi

On the Jobbik list:

1. Krisztina Morvai
2. Zoltán Balczó
3. Béla Kovács

On the Hungarian Socialist Party list:

1. Tibor Szanyi
2. István Ujhelyi

On the Democratic Coalition list:

1. Csaba Molnár
2. Péter Niedermüller

On the Together 2014–Dialogue for Hungary list:

1. Benedek Jávor

On the Politics Can Be Different list:

1. Tamás Meszerics
