= Ernő Schaller-Baross =

Hungarian diplomat, politician (born 1987)

Ernő Schaller-Baross MEP
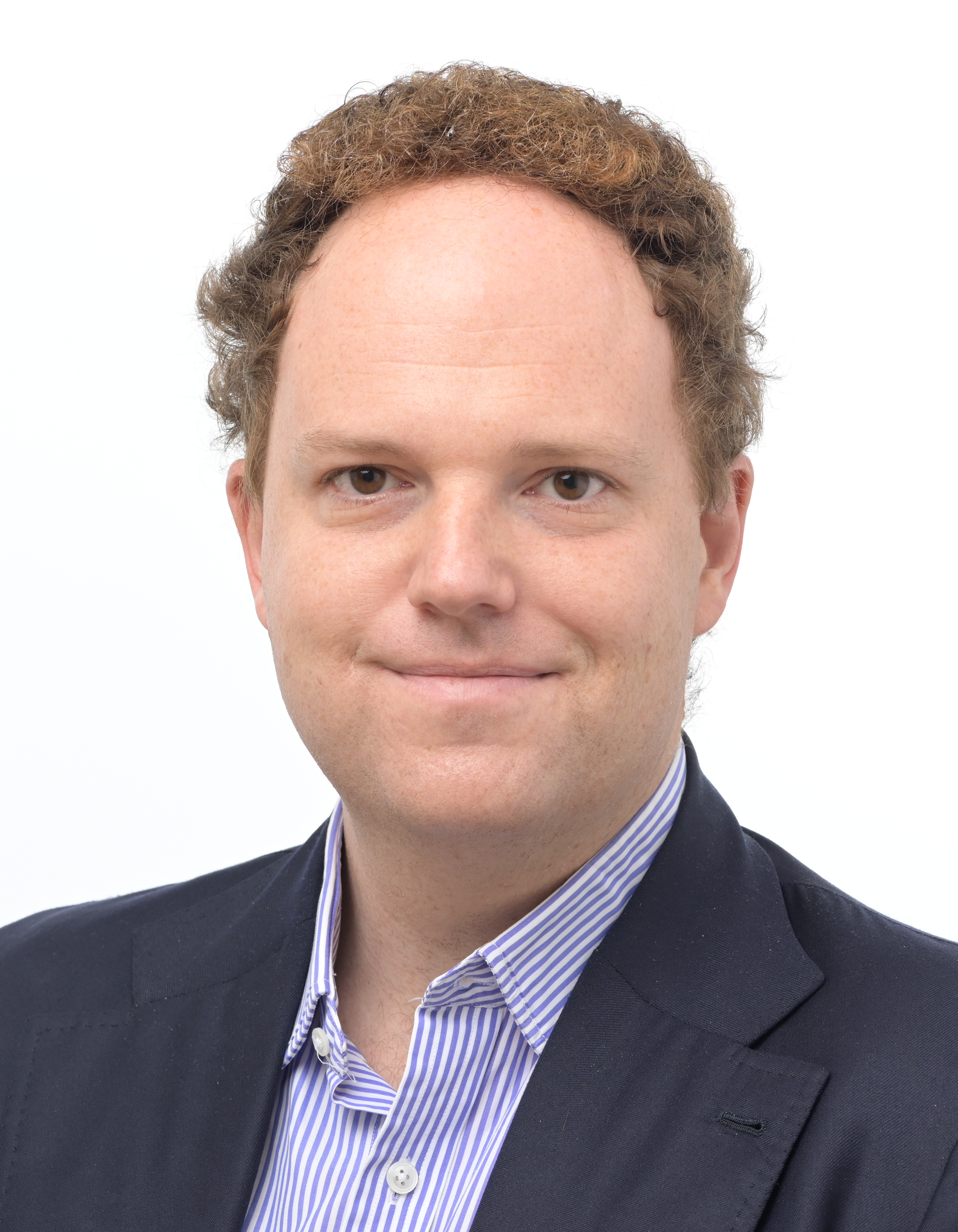

Member of the European Parliament
- Incumbent
- Assumed office 10 January 2021
- Preceded by: József Szájer
- Constituency: Hungary

Ministerial Commissioner at the Prime Minister's Office of Hungary
- Incumbent
- Assumed office February 2020

Deputy State Secretary for International Affairs at the Prime Minister's Office of Hungary
- In office May 2018 – January 2021

Personal details
- Born: 30 January 1987 (age 39) Budapest, Hungary
- Party: Fidesz
- Education: Károli Gáspár University

Ernő Schaller-Baross (born 30 January 1987) is a Hungarian diplomat and politician. He has been serving as a member of the European Parliament since 2021. He is a member of Fidesz.

== Early life ==
Schaller-Baross was born on 30 January 1987 in Budapest. He became a member of Fidelitas, the youth organization of Fidesz, in 2002. He graduated from the Austrian High School in Budapest in 2005. He studied law at the Károli Gáspár University in Budapest and received his degree in 2010.

== Career ==
He has been a member of Fidesz since 2010. From 2010 to 2013, Schaller-Baross worked as a legal secretary at the State Secretariat for Parliamentary Affairs of the Ministry of Public Administration and Justice. Between 2013 and 2018, he was the director of foreign affairs of the Foundation for a Civic Hungary, the party foundation of Fidesz.

Between 2017 and 2018, he supported the leader of the Parliamentary Group of Fidesz as a foreign policy advisor. Between May 2018 and January 2021, he was the Deputy State Secretary for International Affairs at the Prime Minister's Office of Hungary. Since 2021, he has been a Member of the European Parliament (MEP) for Fidesz.

Ernő Schaller-Baross took over his mandate as a member of the European Parliament in January 2021. He began his career as a full member of the Committee on Legal Affairs (JURI) and the Committee on Employment and Social Affairs (EMPL), and as a substitute member of the Delegation for relations with the United States of America. In September 2021, as non-attached Member of the European Parliament, he became full member of the Special Committee on Artificial Intelligence (AIDA) and substitute member of the Committee on Industry, Research and Energy (ITRE). Since January 2022 Ernő Schaller-Baross is a member of the Committee on International Trade (INTA).

== Other information ==
- 2020 - Ministerial Commissioner at the Prime Minister's Office of Hungary
- 2020 - Board member of the Hungarian Golf Federation
- In 2019, he participated in the James S. Denton Transatlantic Fellowship organised by the Center for European Policy Analysis (CEPA) in Washington, D.C.
- In autumn 2020, he was a participant in the International Visitor Leadership Program (IVLP) organised by the U.S. Department of State
- 2019 - member of the supervisory board of the Otto Habsburg Foundation
