= Elemér Hankiss =

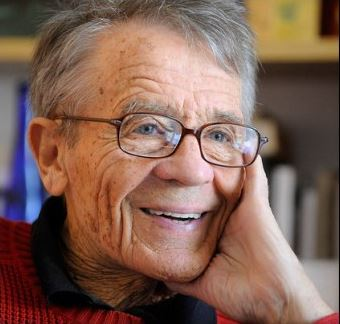

Elemér Hankiss (4 May 1928 – 10 January 2015) was a Hungarian sociologist. His first wife was MEP Ágnes Hankiss. In 2006 he was awarded the Széchenyi Prize.

== Career ==
He was born in the town of Debrecen in eastern Hungary, where his father, János Hankiss was a professor of literature.

He received his university degree in French and English languages from School of English and American Studies of the Faculty of Humanities of the Eötvös Loránd University in Budapest, where he later obtained a PhD.

Following the 1956 Hungarian Revolution he spent 10 months in pretrial detention but was eventually acquitted.

He was the president of the Hungarian Television from 1990 to 1993. It was a state-owned monopoly at the time, which he tried to turn into a modern, production- and viewer-oriented, competition-ready media company. In 1993, he was controversially forced to resign in connection with the so-called Media War (Médiaháború) between the government and the media in the early 1990s.

He has written extensively on values system in Hungary and Central Europe, as well as on global civilization. His concept of Second Society has been much cited in East European Studies.

He was a professor at Stanford University, the Bruges and Florence University Institutes, as well as the Central European University.

== Death ==
He died in Budapest after a short illness on 10 January 2015.

== Works ==
- Fears and Symbols: An Introduction to the Study of Western Civilization (2006).

== See also ==
- Parallel Polis
