= Zoltán Balczó =

Hungarian politician

Zoltán Balczó MEP
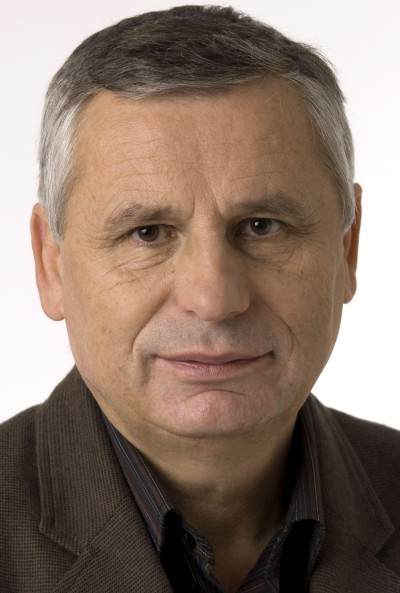

Member of the European Parliament
- In office 1 July 2014 – 1 July 2019
- In office 1 July 2009 – 13 May 2010
- Constituency: Hungary

Deputy Speaker of the National Assembly
- In office 14 May 2010 – 5 May 2014

Member of the National Assembly
- In office 18 June 1998 – 14 May 2002
- In office 14 May 2010 – 20 June 2014
- In office 8 July 2019 – 1 May 2022

Personal details
- Born: 1 January 1948 (age 78) Nyíregyháza, Hungary
- Party: Hungarian; Jobbik; EU; Non-Inscrits
- Spouse: Zsófia Balczó
- Children: Mátyás; Dorottya
- Education: University of Budapest, Budapest University of Technology and Economics

Zoltán Balczó (born 1 January 1948) is a Hungarian politician and a former Member of the European Parliament (MEP) from Hungary between 2009–2010 and 2014–2019. He is a member of Jobbik. He is a former Deputy Speaker of the National Assembly of Hungary. He was a Member of Parliament from 1998 to 2002, from 2010 to 2014 and from 2019 to 2022.

His older brother is András Balczó, the Olympic champion.

After the 2010 elections, he was appointed one of the deputy speakers of the National Assembly of Hungary. As a result, he was replaced by Béla Kovács in the European Parliament. He was elected MEP again in the 2014 European Parliament election; as a result, he resigned from his national parliamentary mandate in June 2014.

== See also ==
- 2009 European Parliament election in Hungary
