= Zoltán Bagó =

Hungarian politician

Zoltán Bagó (born 10 January 1975 in Kalocsa) is a Hungarian politician who was a Member of the European Parliament (MEP) with the Hungarian Civic Party, part of the European People's Party.

He is a graduate of the University of Szeged, apprenticeship and internships in the offices of the national administration, and among other the U.S. Department of State. He worked in local government and municipal organizations. In the mid-90s he joined Fidesz in 2004 became the head of the party structures in his hometown of. In the 2009 elections unsuccessfully ran for parliamentary seat. However he became MEP a year later, replacing Enikő Győri.
