= Klára Ungár =

Hungarian politician

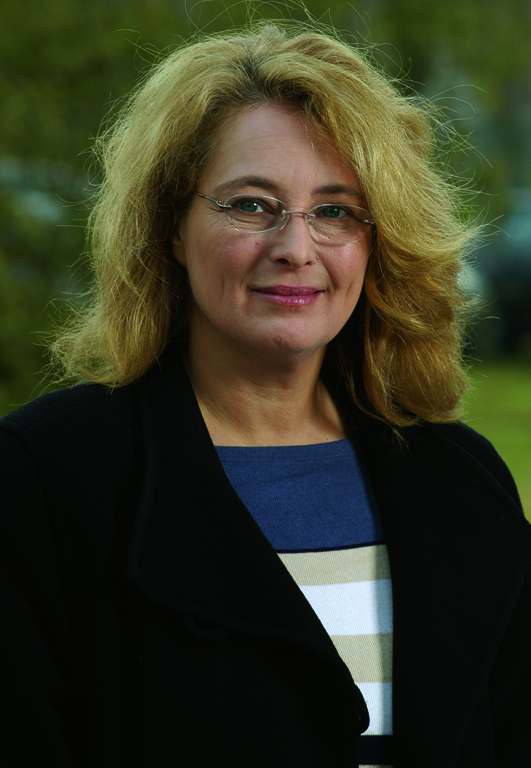
Ungár Klára in 2008

Klára Ungár (born August 14, 1958, in Budapest) is a Hungarian politician. She sat in the National Assembly for the Alliance of Free Democrats until 1998. She is one of the first openly lesbian politicians in Hungary.
