= Magda Kósáné Kovács =

Hungarian politician (1940–2020)

Member of the European Parliament

Personal details
- Born: 4 November 1940 Budapest, Hungary
- Died: 27 July 2020 (aged 79) Budapest, Hungary
- Party: MSZMP (–1989); MSZP (1989–2011); DK (2011–)
- Spouse: Dr Levente Kósa
- Children: Judit; Eszter
- Profession: politician

Magda Kósáné Kovács (4 November 1940 – 27 July 2020) was a Hungarian politician who was a Member of the European Parliament (MEP) for the Hungarian Socialist Party, part of the Party of European Socialists.

She left the Socialist Party and joined Democratic Coalition founded and led by Ferenc Gyurcsány in 2011 and became head of the new party's ethical committee.

== Personal life ==
She was married to Dr Levente Kósa. She is survived by two daughters, Judit and Eszter.
