= Ágnes Hankiss =

Hungarian politician (1950–2021)

Ágnes Hankiss (born Ágnes Erdős; 7 March 1950 – 17 August 2021) was a Hungarian politician and elected Member of the European Parliament (MEP) with Fidesz, a member of the European People's Party. She was born and died in Budapest, Hungary. Her son is politician and traffic expert Dávid Vitézy and she was the first wife of Hungarian sociologist Elemér Hankiss.

Hankiss is best known in English for her 1992 historical novel A Hungarian Romance: A Novel.

== See also ==
- 2009 European Parliament election in Hungary
