= György Hölvényi =

Hungarian politician

György Hölvényi MEP
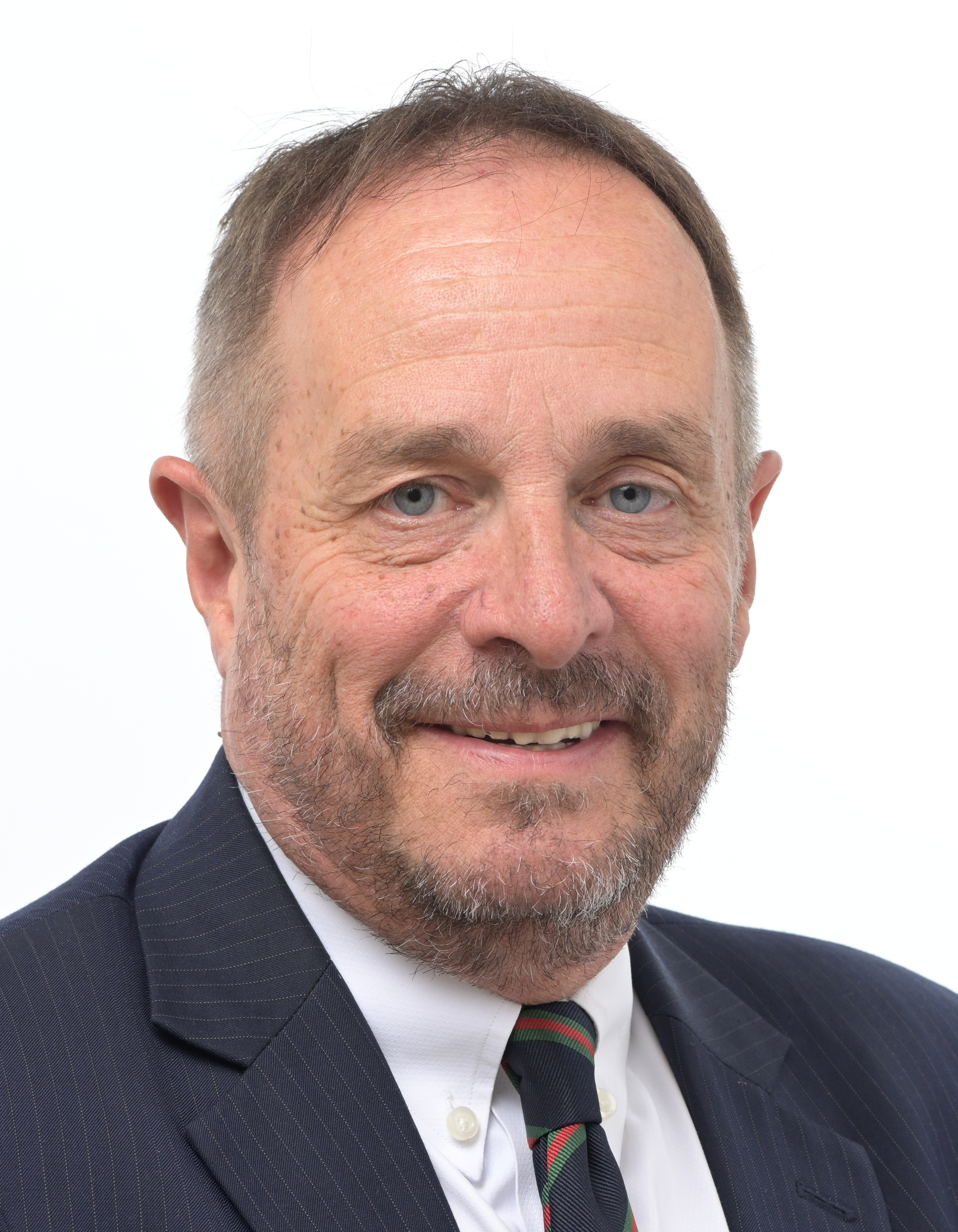
- Hölvényi in 2024

Member of the European Parliament for Hungary
- Incumbent
- Assumed office 1 July 2014

Personal details
- Born: 13 June 1962 (age 64) Budapest, Hungary
- Party: Christian Democratic People's Party
- Education: Eötvös Loránd University

György Hölvényi (born 13 June 1962) is a Hungarian politician currently serving as a Member of the European Parliament for the Christian Democratic People's Party. He previously served as the Secretary of State for Human Resources (directly below the responsible minister) from 9 July 2012 to 5 June 2014.

== See also ==
- List of members of the European Parliament for Hungary, 2019–2024
