= Andrea Bocskor =

Hungarian politician

Andrea Bocskor MEP
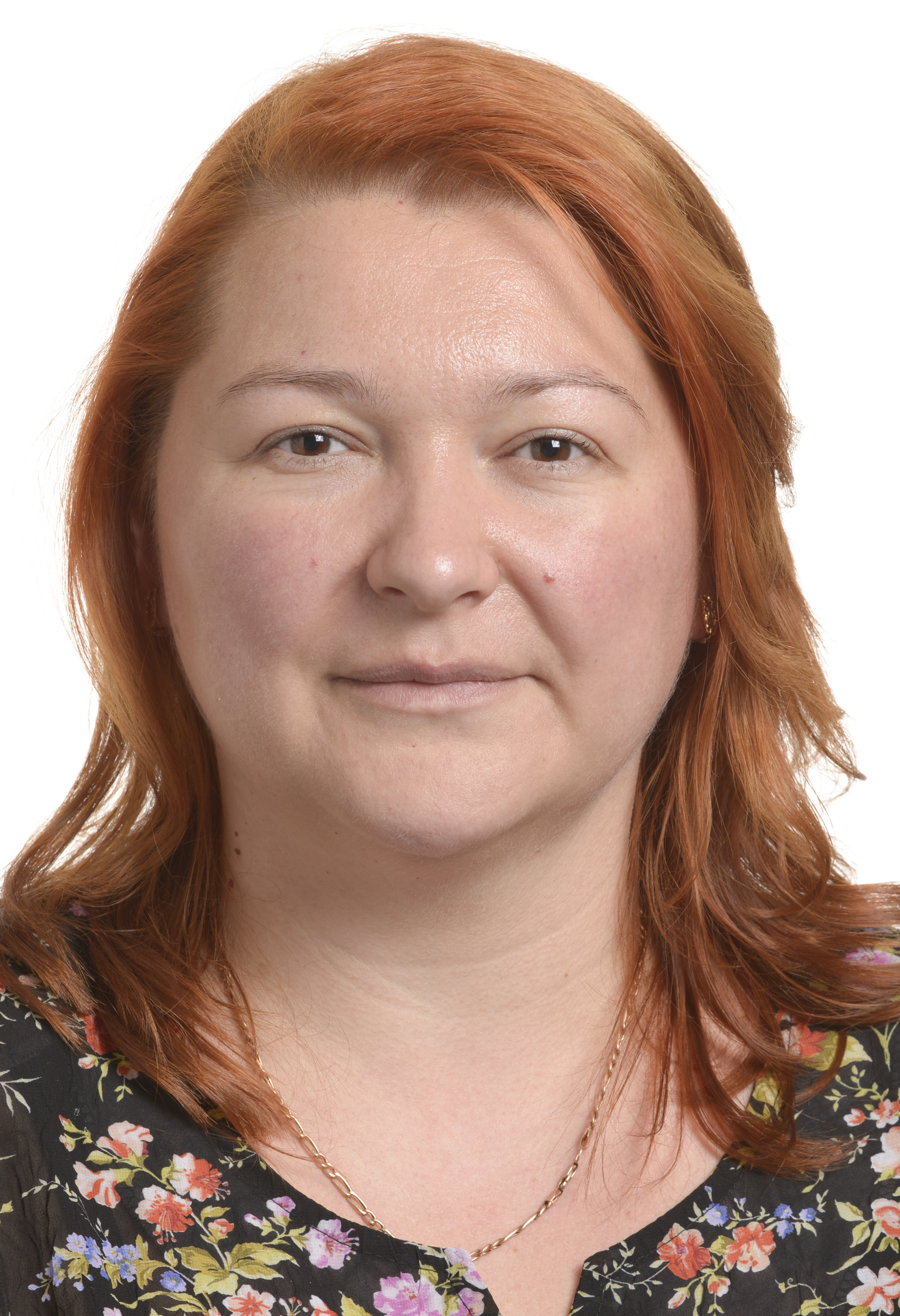

Member of the European Parliament
- In office 1 July 2014 – 15 July 2024
- Constituency: Hungary

Personal details
- Born: 11 August 1978 (age 48) Berehove, Ukrainian SSR, Soviet Union
- Party: Fidesz

Andrea Bocskor (Ukrainian: Андрея Гейзівна Бочкор; born 11 August 1978) is a Hungarian politician and Member of the European Parliament (MEP) from Hungary. She graduated in English-History at the Trascarpathian Hungarian Teachers' Training College. She did her PhD in 2010 at the ELTE-BTK in Budapest. In 2013, she held the title of Candidate of Historical Sciences in Kyiv at the Institute of Ukrainian History-National Academy of Science. Before becoming an MEP, she was a docent of the Ferenc Rákóczi II Transcarpathian Hungarian Institute in the Faculty of History and Social Sciences, and Director of the Lehoczky Tivadar Institute in Berehove, Ukraine. She has served as MEP since 2014.

She is a member of Fidesz. Her main political aim is to represent the Transcarpathian Hungarian minority in the EU, promote the rights of national minorities, the European cultural and linguistic diversity and to ensure the use of minority languages at European level. Moreover, she supports European integration and the political and economic stability of Ukraine.

She holds besides her Hungarian citizenship also Ukrainian citizenship (this practice is quite common among the Hungarian minority in Ukraine, although at the time of her election Ukrainian law did not recognise dual citizenship). Hence, she became the first elected Ukrainian in the European Parliament. Bocskor lives in Ukraine; in the city of Berehove.

She speaks fluently Hungarian, Ukrainian, Russian and English.
