= László Surján =

Hungarian politician

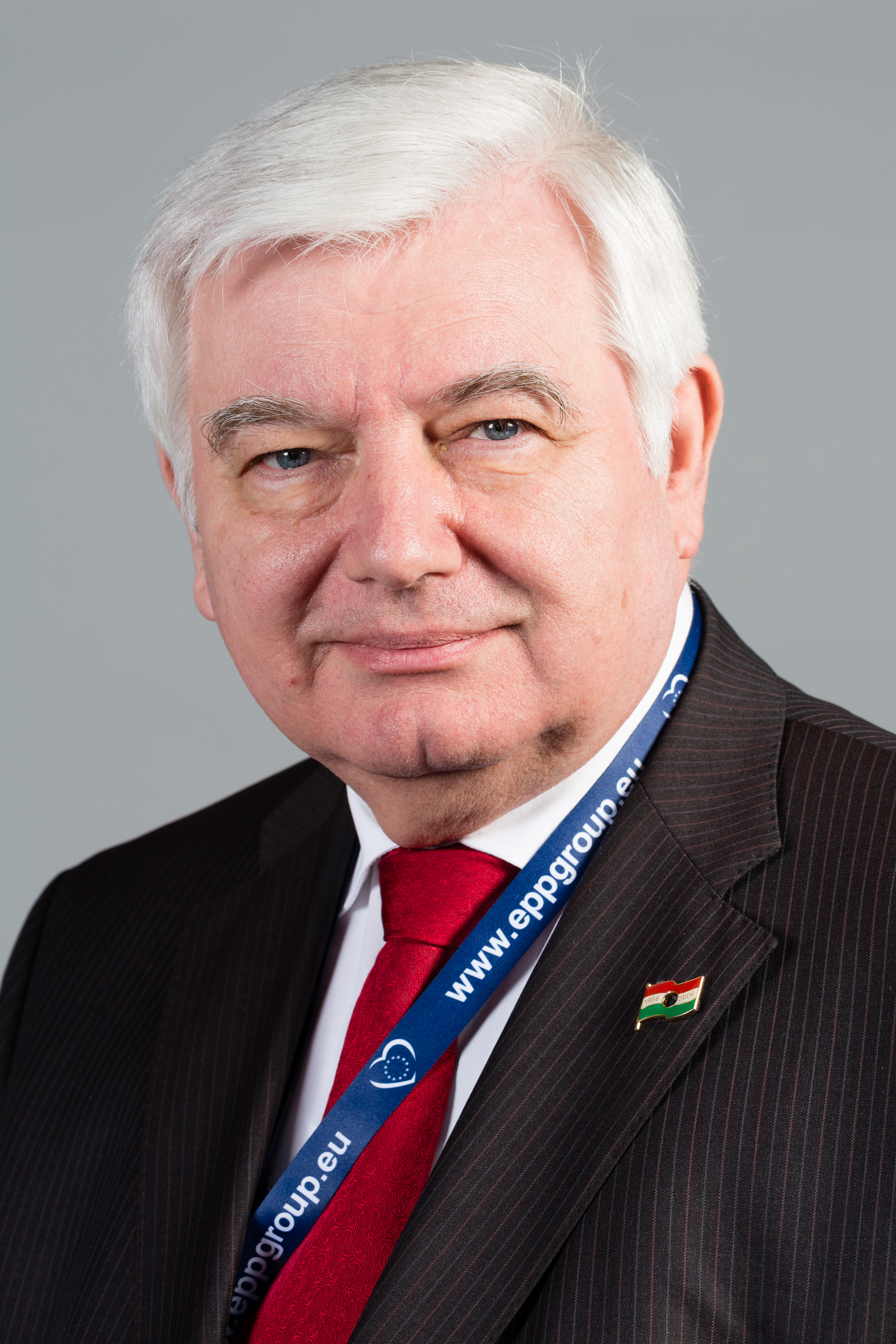

Member of the European Parliament for Hungary
- In office 2004–2014

Personal details
- Born: 7 September 1941 (age 84) Kolozsvár
- Party: Fidesz, European People's Party, Christian Democratic People's Party (Hungary)
- Spouse: Lászlóné Surján
- Children: László György; Zsófia Margit; Orsolya Katalin
- Profession: Physician

László Surján (born 7 September 1941 in Kolozsvár, (now Cluj-Napoca, Romania) is a Hungarian politician and Member of the European Parliament (MEP) with the FIDESZ from 2004 to 2014.

He was the president of the Christian Democratic People's Party (Hungary) political party from 1994-1998. He remained a member of the party to this day.

Surján was a substitute for the Committee on Regional Development and a vice-chair of the Delegation to the EU-Chile Joint Parliamentary Committee.

He was a signatory of the Prague Declaration on European Conscience and Communism.

== Education ==
- 1969: General practitioner
- 1969: Professor's assistant, Institute of Histology, Budapest University of Medicine
- University of Further Medical Training

== Career ==
- 1990–1995: Chairman of the Christian Democratic Party
- 1995–1997 and since 2001: Vice-Chairman
- 1992–1998: Vice-President of the EUCD (European Union of Christian Democrats)
- 1994–1998: Chairman of the Employment Committee of the Hungarian Parliament
- 1998–2002: Vice-Chairman of the Foreign Affairs Committee
- 1990–1994: Minister of Welfare
- 1999–2004: Deputy leader, Group of the European People's Party, Parliamentary Assembly of the Council of Europe
- 2000–2001: Head, Hungarian delegation (1998-2002), Deputy Speaker, Hungarian Parliament
- 2004–2014: Member of the European Parliament
- Member of the bureau, EPP-ED group (since 2004), Vice-Chairman of the Delegation for Relations with Chile
- since 2012: Vice-President of the European Parliament

== Personal life ==
He is married to Lászlóné Surján, they have together three children - two daughters, Zsófia Margit and Orsolya Katalin as well as a son, László György.

== See also ==
- 2004 European Parliament election in Hungary
