= Edit Herczog =

Hungarian politician (born 1961)

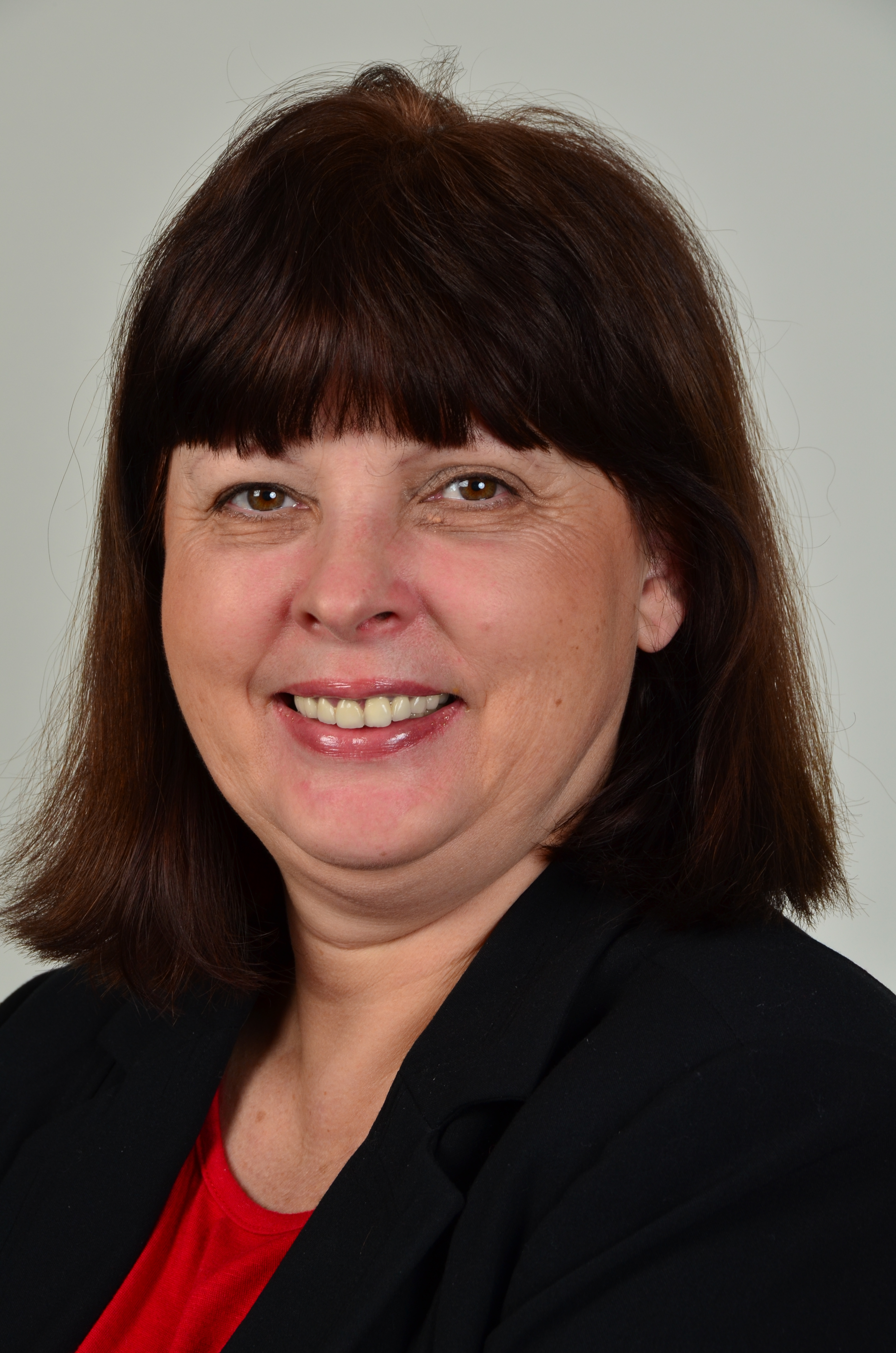
Herczog in February 2014

Edit Herczog (born 6 May 1961 in Budapest) is a Hungarian Socialist Party politician who was a Member of the European Parliament between 2004 and 2014.

== Hungarian Socialist Party work ==
Born 6 May 1961 in Budapest, Herczog has been a member of the Hungarian Socialist Workers' Party and of the Hungarian Socialist Party (MSZP) since 1989. She was elected as an MP in 1998 and also in 2002 in Fejér county. She became a member of the national presidency of the MSZP in 2007. She worked her way up the bureaucracy of the MSZP, through the Procedural Committee, in the Committee of the European Integration Affairs between 1998–2002 and in the Committee of Foreign Affairs and of Environmental Protection since 2002.

Herczog was a member of the Hungarian delegation of the European Commission from 1999. Being leader of the female committee of the socialist group in Strasbourg she was also a member of the group leadership. She took part in the work of the Hungarian-English and Hungarian-American branches of the Inter-Parliamentary Union, as vice-president.

== Activities in the European Parliament ==
Herczog was a member of the European Parliament from May 2004. Her committee work included the Internal Market and Consumer Protection, Delegation for relations with Canada and the EU-EEA. She was a substitute for the Committee on Industry, Research and Energy and for the Committee on Budgetary Control. She was also member of the Small and Medium Enterprises Working Group and the Lisbon Strategy Working Group. She is a Presidency member of the following European organizations: European Energy Forum, European Internet Foundation, Forum for the Future of Nuclear Energy, Cangaroo Group and the European Parliament-Business Forum.

Herczog gained some attention for an attempted intervention into a speech being made by Nigel Farage MEP, a representative for the United Kingdom Independence Party., when she told him, "And Mr. Farage, I’d like to say something Hungarian quotation for you, it is good that you are here because if the monkey goes up to the tree, it is better seen how red is his popo." The video of this performance became widely popular, partially on the basis of Farage's attack on the appointment of the top European roles of High Representative of the Union for Foreign Affairs and Security Policy and President of the European Council, but also for the unusual language employed.

== Career ==
Herczog has worked for the following:

- The University of Horticulture (food conservation engineer) (1985)
- Eötvös Loránd University (Portuguese Department) (1992)
- Hungarian Academy of Sciences (research fellow) (1985-1989)
- University of Horticulture (professor's assistant) (1989-1994)
- Unilever Hungary (1994-1997)
- ICI Hungary (1997-2004)
- National Starch Chemical (manager, Central and Eastern European Region).

== Personal life ==
She is married to Dr Péter Szeredi. They have a daughter, Zsuzsanna, and two sons, Péter and Bálint.
