= József Szájer =

Hungarian politician (born 1961)

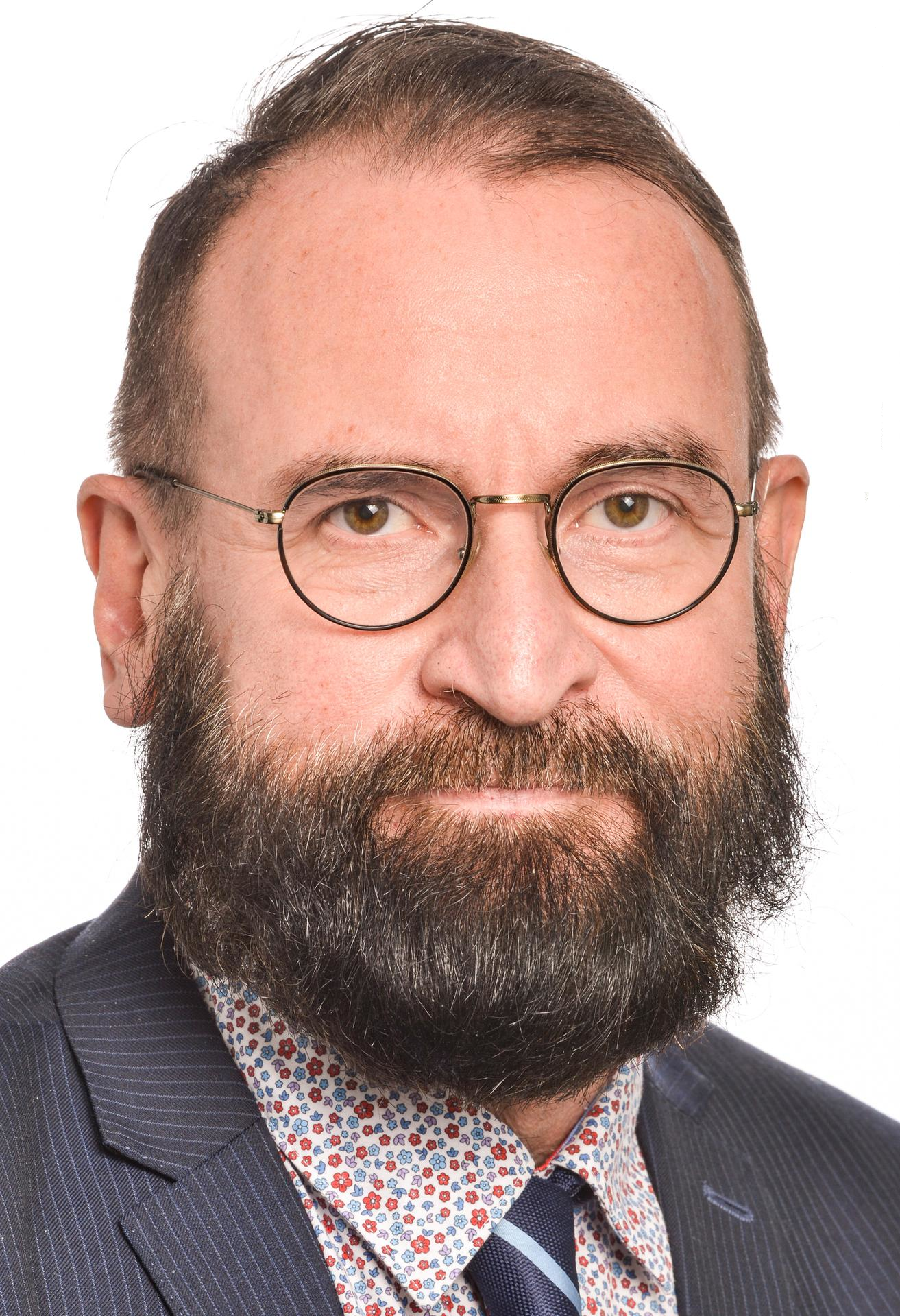
- Official portrait, 2019

Member of the European Parliament
- In office 1 July 2004 – 31 December 2020
- Succeeded by: Ernő Schaller-Baross
- Constituency: Hungary

Member of the National Assembly
- In office 2 May 1990 – 19 July 2004

Personal details
- Born: 7 September 1961 (age 65) Sopron, Hungarian People's Republic
- Party: Hungarian; Fidesz (1988–2020); EU; European People's Party
- Spouse: Tünde Handó (m. 1983)
- Children: 1
- Education: Eötvös Loránd University

József Szájer (born 7 September 1961) is a retired Hungarian politician and former Member of the European Parliament (MEP) of the Fidesz party. He resigned as MEP on 29 November 2020 (effective at the end of December) after having been caught by Belgian police after a gay sex orgy on the night of 27 November, in violation of local COVID-19 regulations.

== Early life and education ==
József Szájer was born in Sopron on 7 September 1961, the eldest son of schoolmaster József Szájer, Sr. and primary school teacher Edit Kiss. His parents died of carbon monoxide poisoning on 26 November 1982. As a result, Szájer became the guardian of his younger brothers at the age of 21. He finished his elementary and secondary studies at his birthplace.

Szájer studied at Bibó István College and graduated as legal expert from Eötvös Loránd University (ELTE) in Budapest in 1986. He then worked for a decade as lecturer at ELTE's department of Roman Law. Receiving a scholarship from the Soros Foundation, he also attended Balliol College, Oxford, from 1986 to 1987 and undertook research at the University of Michigan from 1988 to 1989. He passed the bar exam in 1996, after which he practised as a lawyer. Szájer served as the first president of the Oxford Hungarian Society (OHS) from 1987.

== Political career ==
=== Within Hungary ===
In 1988, Szájer was a founding member of the Fidesz party, and took part in the Hungarian Round Table Talks from 1989 to 1990. In 1990, he was elected member of the Hungarian Parliament – a seat he maintained until he became an MEP in 2004. From 1994 to 2002, he headed the Fidesz parliamentary group and, from 1998 to 2002, he chaired the Parliament's European integration committee. He served as vice-president of Fidesz from 1996 until 2003 and, from 2000 to 2012, he was member of the Board of Council of Europe. In 2007, he became a founding member of Magyar Szabadság Kör (Hungarian Liberty Club).

While serving as MEP, in 2010 Szájer was appointed to chair the drafting committee of the new Hungarian Constitution and led the national consultative committee. The draft was written by Szájer on his iPad. The committee recommended several notable changes to the constitution, including a proposal to allow parents to vote in elections on behalf of their under-age children, and an article banning abortion. The new constitution also emphasised the definition of marriage as being between man and woman, in an apparent repudiation of calls for the recognition of same-sex marriage.

=== European Parliament ===
In 2003, Szájer joined the Convention on the Future of Europe and was an observer member of the European Parliament, ahead of Hungary's EU accession. In 2004, Szájer was first elected to the European Parliament and appointed among the vice-chairmen of the Group of the European People's Party and European Democrats. From 2004 to 2007, Szájer served as a member of the Committee on the Internal Market and Consumer Protection, then as a member of the Committee on Constitutional Affairs (2007–2014).

In 2008, Szájer was a signatory of the Prague Declaration on European Conscience and Communism. In 2009, having been re-elected, he was appointed head of the Hungarian EPP delegation (until 2011) and chief whip and vice-chairman of the European People's Party group (until 2020). From 2014 until his resignation in 2020, he was an active member of the Committee on Legal Affairs. In 2019, he received the Petőfi Prize. Szájer was a substitute for the Committee on International Trade, and a member of the Delegation for relations with the United States.

=== Gay sex party and resignation ===
Szájer resigned as MEP on 29 November 2020, effective at the end of December, after Belgian police caught him fleeing a private 25-man orgy above a gay bar, hosted by David Manzheley, on the night of 27 November, in violation of local coronavirus regulations. Szájer was not an invited guest at the party and was accompanied by a friend. The party was interrupted after neighbors called the police to complain about the noise. All attendees at the party were fined €250.

According to a statement by the federal prosecutor's office, Szájer was seen fleeing via a window and a drainpipe. His hands were bloody, and an ecstasy pill was found in his backpack, though he denied the drug was his. He was unable to produce any identity documents on the spot, so police escorted him to his home, where he produced a diplomatic passport. Prior to the scandal, there were already rumors that he was gay, which had been publicly asserted in 2015 by former Fidesz politician Klára Ungár.

Szájer resigned from Fidesz on 2 December 2020. Prime Minister and party leader Viktor Orbán told Magyar Nemzet: "what our fellow member József Szájer has done does not fit into the values of our political community. We will not forget and refuse his thirty years of work, but his actions are unacceptable and indefensible". Fellow MEPs, including Márton Gyöngyösi (Jobbik), Manon Aubry (La France Insoumise), and Terry Reintke (Alliance 90/The Greens), accused Szájer and Fidesz of hypocrisy, given the party's stances on LGBT issues. According to András Fekete-Győr, the leader of the opposition party Momentum Movement, the incident revealed the "complete moral bankruptcy of Fidesz".

In the following days, a memorial plaque was attached to the drainpipe that Szájer had descended to escape the sex party. Street artist Laika also created a mural in Rome depicting Szájer as a gay icon. In 2010, Szájer had become an honorary citizen of Sopron. As a result of the scandal, he resigned from the honorary citizenship on 3 December 2020.

== Personal life ==
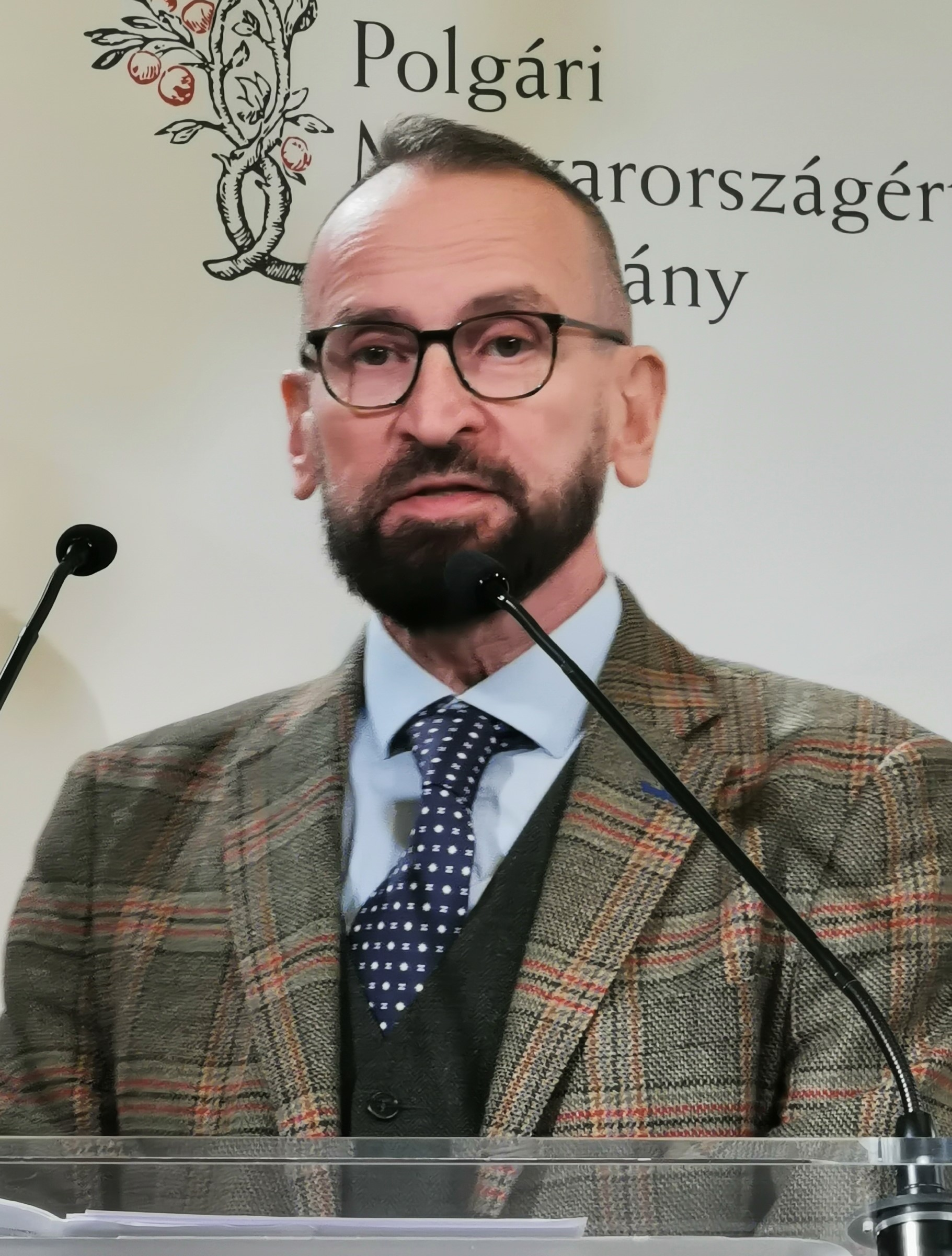
József Szájer in 2024

Szájer has been married since 1983 to Tünde Handó, who became a justice on the Constitutional Court of Hungary in January 2020. The couple have a daughter born in 1987. In 2015, Alliance of Free Democrats member Klára Ungár, who is openly lesbian, claimed that Szájer and another Fidesz politician Máté Kocsis were gay. Kocsis brought a defamation lawsuit against Ungár. He won in the lower court, but lost on appeal.

== Books ==
- Jogállam, szabadság, rendszerváltoztatás (1998)
- Európa (2004)
- Szabad Magyarország, szabad Európa (2014)
- Ne bántsd a magyart! Gondolatok a bevándorlásról, a Fideszről, Magyarországról, Alaptörvényünkről és Európáról (2019)

== See also ==
- List of members of the European Parliament for Hungary, 2014–2019
- List of members of the European Parliament for Hungary, 2019–2024
- LGBTQ rights in Hungary

National Assembly of Hungary
Preceded by László Kövér	Leader of Fidesz in the National Assembly; 1994–1997	Succeeded by Zoltán Pokorni
Preceded by Zoltán Pokorni	Leader of Fidesz in the National Assembly; 1998–2002	Succeeded by Zoltán Pokorni
