= Gyula Hegyi =

Hungarian politician

Member of the European Parliament
- In office 2004–2009

Personal details
- Born: April 30, 1951 Békéscsaba, Hungary
- Party: Hungarian Socialist Party
- Other political affiliations: Party of European Socialists
- Education: Budapest University of Technology
- Occupation: Politician, journalist, writer
- Committees: Environment, Public Health and Food Safety; Culture and Education (substitute)

Gyula Hegyi (born 30 April 1951) is a Hungarian politician and a former Member of the European Parliament for the Hungarian Socialist Party, part of the Party of European Socialists.

== Biography ==
Gyula Hegyi was born on 30 April 1951 in Békéscsaba. He studied at the Budapest University of Technology, from where he graduated in 1975. Two years later he finished the school of the Association of Hungarian Journalists (MÚOSZ) in 1975. He worked for the culture and the 'comment' section of the Hungarian newspaper, Magyar Hírlap.

He published some thousand articles on culture and politics in Hungarian dailies and weeklies and he also wrote nine books: three collections of verses, six collections of essays and other articles.

From the time of the change of regime in Hungary until he became MP in the Hungarian Parliament Gyula Hegyi had been the spokesman and the member of the presidency of several Hungarian organisation, such as Demokratikus Charta, Nyilvánosság Klub and Amnesty International. He is the member of the Association of Catholic Journalists, the Hungarian Writer's Association, and several environmental movements.

== Hegyi and the Hungarian Socialist Party ==
Hegyi joined the Hungarian Socialist Party on 15 March 1995. He was elected to MP three times, in 1994, 1998 and 2002. He was the member of the Human Rights Committee and European Integration Committee in his first term. He was the vice-chairman of the NGO Committee in his second term, and had the same position in the Environmental Committee from 2002. Hegyi represents the left wing of the party.

== Hegyi in the European Parliament ==
Hegyi was elected to the Member of the European Parliament from the list of the Hungarian Socialist Party in June 2004. He became the member of the Environment, Public Health and Food Safe Committee and the substitute member of the Culture and Education Committee. He participates in the work of the West-Balkan Delegation and the vice-chairman of the Macedonian Delegation. As one of the most active Hungarian MEP, he has been the rapporteur or co-rapporteur of some twenty reports of environmental and cultural issues. After his mandate at the European Parliament, he joined the cabinet of European Commissioner László Andor.

== Relevant Links ==
- Hegyi Gyula's personal web site
- Hegyi Gyula's official web site
- Hegyi Gyula's Member of European Parliament page
- Learn from our failures and create a socialist democracy article, Guardian newspaper, Dec. 2006
- New Warsaw pact article in Guardian, Sept. 2008.
