= Ádám Kósa =

Hungarian politician

Ádám Kósa MEP

Member of the European Parliament
- In office 1 July 2014 – 15 July 2024
- Constituency: Hungary

Personal details
- Born: 1 July 1975 (age 50) Budapest, Hungary
- Party: Hungarian: Fidesz; EU:
- Website: European parliament

Ádám Kósa (born 1 July 1975) is a Hungarian politician and Member of the European Parliament (MEP) from Hungary. He is a member of Fidesz.

He is the first deaf European politician user of Deaf Sign Language in the European Parliament. He was president of the Hungarian Association of the Deaf and Hard of Hearing from 2005 to 2022.

== Education ==
Kósa graduated from Pázmány Péter Catholic University in 2000. He graduated from Semmelweis University. He has worked as a lawyer.

== See also ==
- 2009 European Parliament election in Hungary
