= Béla Glattfelder =

Hungarian politician

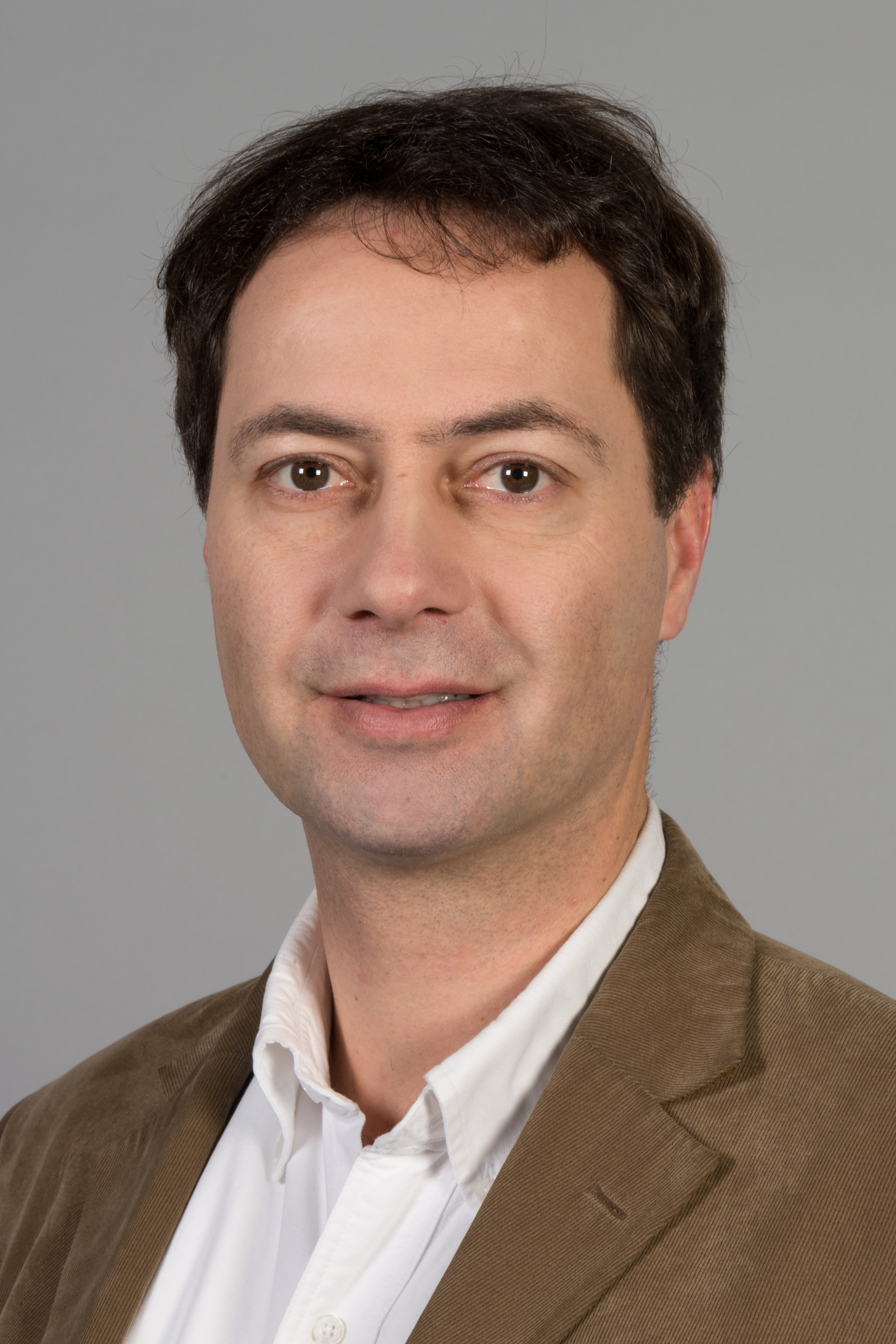
Béla Glattfelder in 2014

Béla Glattfelder (born 4 May 1967 in Budapest) is a Hungarian politician and Member of the European Parliament (MEP) with the Hungarian Civic Party, part of the European People's Party and sits on the European Parliament's Committee on International Trade.

Glattfelder is a substitute for the Committee on Agriculture and Rural Development and the Committee on Fisheries. Glattfelder is also a member of the Delegation for relations with Mercosur.

== Education ==
- 1992: Agricultural engineer, University of Agriculture, Gödöllő (GATE)
- 1994: Agricultural Research and Informatics Institute

== Career ==
- 1990–2004: Member of the Hungarian Parliament
- 2000–2002: Undersecretary of State, Ministry of Economic Affairs

== Personal life ==
He is married to Éva Umenhoffer.

== See also ==
- 2004 European Parliament election in Hungary

Honorary titles
Preceded by ?	Youngest sitting Member of Parliament; 1990–1993	Succeeded by Róbert Répássy
