= Enikő Győri =

Hungarian politician (born 1968)

Enikő Győri MEP
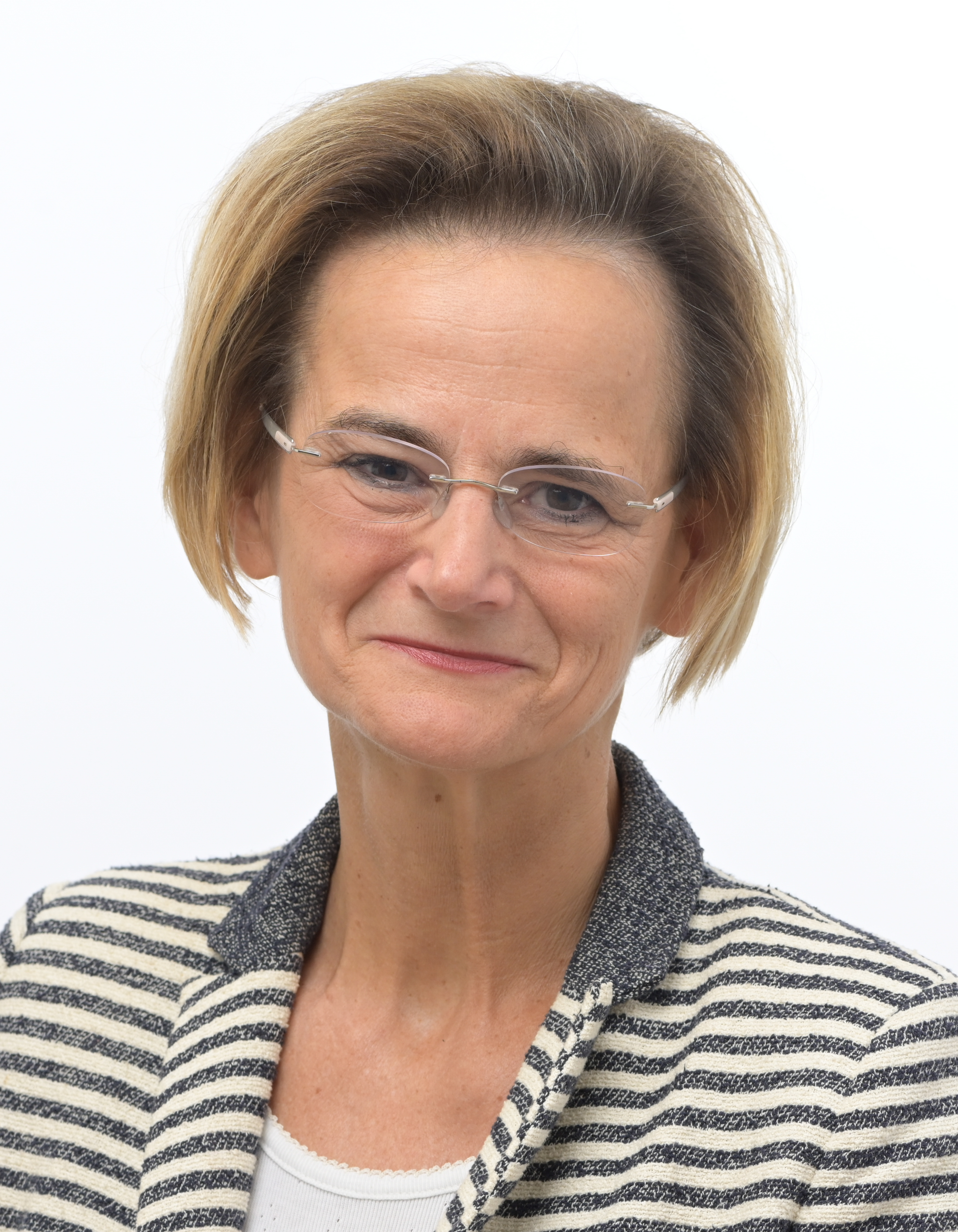

Member of the European Parliament for Hungary
- Incumbent
- Assumed office 2 July 2019
- In office 14 July 2009 – 31 August 2010

Ambassador of Hungary to Spain
- In office 5 June 2014 – 30 June 2019

Secretary of State of Foreign Affairs
- In office 1 September 2010 – 5 June 2014
- Prime Minister: Viktor Orbán
- Minister: János Martonyi

Ambassador of Hungary to Italy
- In office 1999–2003

Personal details
- Born: 17 July 1968 (age 58) Budapest, Hungary
- Party: Fidesz
- Education: Corvinus University of Budapest
- Occupation: Diplomat • Politician

Enikő Győri (born 17 July 1968) is a Hungarian conservative politician and elected Member of the European Parliament (MEP) with Fidesz.

She left the European Parliament on 31 August 2010 to take up a position as State Secretary for European Affairs in her native Hungary.

== Education ==
She earned her degree at the University of Economics, Budapest, Faculty of International Relations in 1992, PhD in 2000. In 1997 she participated at the course offered by École National d’Administration (ENA).

She undertook traineeships in the United States, Belgium, France, Mexico and Spain. Traineeship at the French National Assembly (1998), at the Council of Europe (1998), and at the European Commission (1995).

Languages spoken: English, Italian, Spanish (excellent), French (intermediate).

== Employment ==
Minister of State for European Affairs, Ministry of Foreign Affairs (2010-2011).

Member of the European Parliament (2009-2010), member of the Economic and Monetary Committee.

Head of EU Staff of Fidesz Political Group in the Hungarian National Assembly (2003-2009).

Ambassador of the Hungary to Italy (1999-2003).

Adviser on EU affairs of the Hungarian National Assembly (1992-1999).

Lecturer at ELTE University in Budapest (2004-2009) and Eszterházy Teachers’ College in Eger (1995-1998).

== Public Activity ==
Hungarian member of the working group on “European politics” of the European People's Party (2005-2009).

President of the Italian Forum of Budapest (2004-).

Member of the Board of the Political Science Review, Hungary (2007-).

Director of Free Europe Centre (2004-2009).

== Publications ==
National Parliaments and the European Union, Osiris, 2004.

Co-author of several publications about European integration.

Reports on Latin-America and on the US in the weekly HVG (1991–1992).

== Personal ==
Married, she has two children.

== See also ==
- 2009 European Parliament election in Hungary
