= Csaba Tabajdi =

Hungarian politician

Csaba Sándor Tabajdi
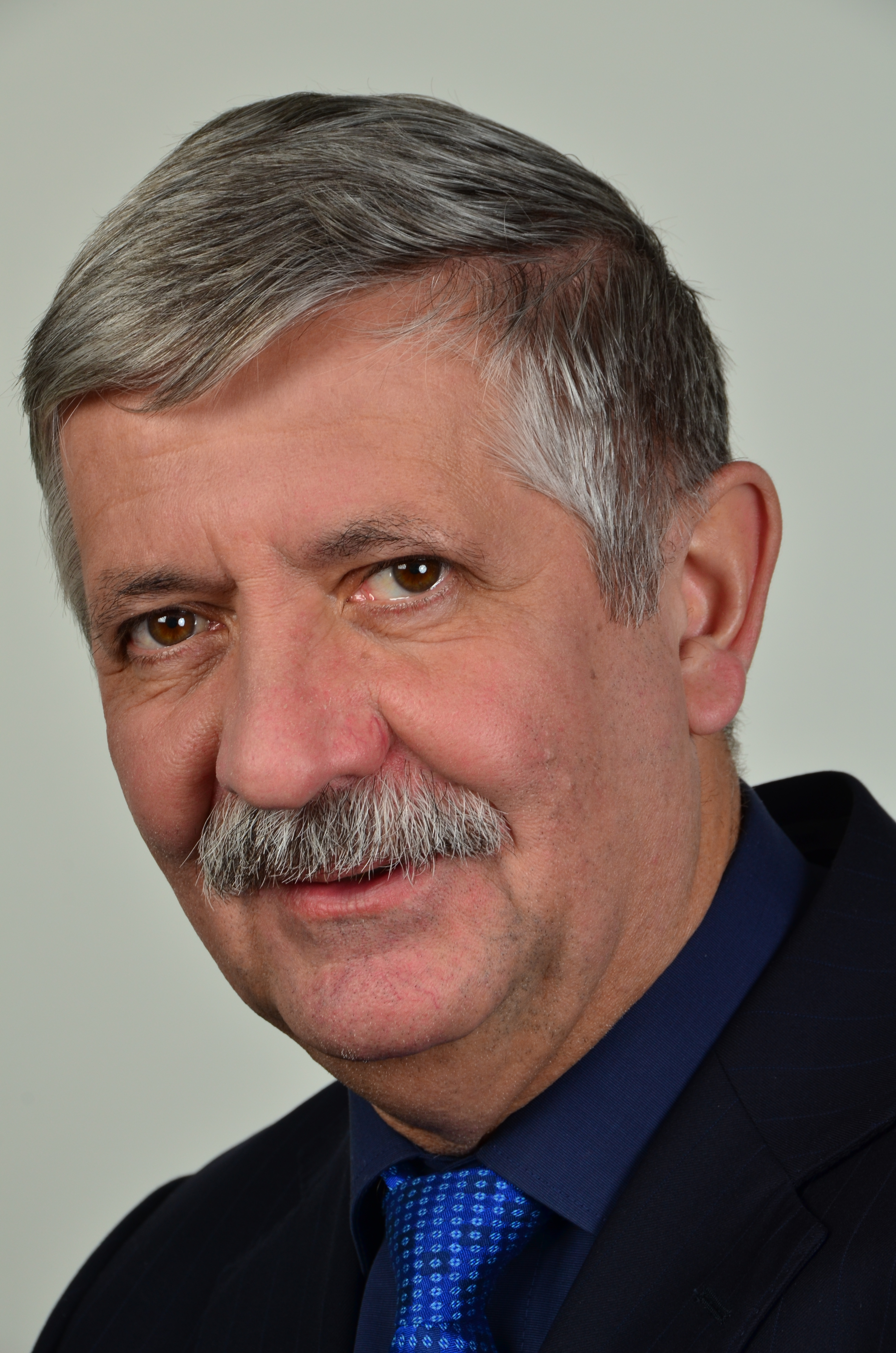

Member of the European Parliament
- In office 20 July 2004 – 30 June 2014

Member of the National Assembly
- In office 15 October 1990 – 14 July 2004

Personal details
- Born: 26 June 1952 (age 74) Kiskunfélegyháza, Hungary
- Party: MSZP
- Education: Karl Marx University of Budapest
- Profession: Economist, Diplomat
- Website: http://www.tabajdi.hu

Csaba Sándor Tabajdi (born June 26, 1952 in Kiskunfélegyháza) is a Hungarian politician and former Member of the European Parliament for the Hungarian Socialist Party, part of the Party of European Socialists. He is a member of the European Parliament Committee on Agriculture and Rural Development, the Committee on Petitions, as well as the Delegation for relations with the People's Republic of China and a substitute member of the Committee on Environment and Public Health and the Delegation to the EU-Russia Parliamentary Cooperation Committee.

== Early life and career ==
He went to primary school in the Southern Hungarian village of Szank, and did his secondary school in Kiskunfélegyháza. In 1974, he got his degree in international relations at the Karl Marx University of Budapest.

In 1974-75 and later in 1981-83 he was an administrator in the Ministry of Foreign Affairs of Hungary.

In 1975-82, he was cultural attaché of the Hungarian Embassy in Moscow for 7 years.

In 1983-89 he worked for the foreign affairs department of the Central Committee of the Hungarian Socialist Workers' Party as a deputy head of the department from 1986 onwards.

In 1989-90 he led the Secretariat of the College of National and Ethnic Minorities for the Council of Ministers.

In 1990-94, he was board member of the Illyés Foundation for Hungarians Living Abroad

== Political career ==
In 1989, he headed the Secretariat of the National and ethnic minorities board of the Council of Ministers of Hungary

In 1989-90, he was a deputy minister in the Government of Hungary.

He was a member of the Hungarian National Assembly between 1990 and 2004 in the group of the Hungarian Socialist Party. From 1991 he was also a member of the Parliamentary Assembly of the Council of Europe in the Social Democratic political group.

In 1994-98 he was political state secretary (deputy minister) at the Office of the Prime Minister. After 1998 he was member, then (from 2002) head of the Hungarian delegation to the Parliamentary Assembly of the Western European Union.

In 1998-2002, he worked as adviser on European integration matters in the Bács-Kiskun Regional Authority

In 2002-04, he was member of the Bács-Kiskun Regional Assembly

Since 2003, he has been a Member of the European Parliament (in 2003-04 as observer) in the Group of the Progressive Alliance of Socialists and Democrats, and the head of the Hungarian Socialist Delegation. Since 2011, he has been the co-chair of the Intergroup of National Minorities, National Communities and Languages. He is the Vice-President of the European Parliamentary Association

== Non-political activities and publications ==
In 2008, Csaba Tabajdi was the founder of the Hungarian Agricultural Academy, a yearly forum of representatives of Hungarian and international agriculture. So far the forum has been held three times (2008, 2009 and 2010).

Since 2008, he has been an honorary professor at the István Széchenyi University of Győr

His scientific publications include:

Az önazonosság labirintusa (The labyrinth of identity), Budapest, 1998

Esélyek és veszélyek (Chances and risks), Budapest, 2002

Magyarságtudat és megélhetés (Hungarian consciousness and subsistence), Budapest, 2002

Unió Európával és a magyar nemzettel (Union with Europe and the Hungarian nation), Budapest, 2003

Keletről nyugatra Európa közepén (From the East to the West in the middle of Europe), Budapest, 2006

Pro minoritate Europae (For the minorities of Europe), European Parliament, Brussels, 2009 (available in English as well)

== Honours and decorations ==
Márton Áron Award (1992)

Award for Bács-Kiskun County (1996, 2004)
