= Csaba Őry =

Hungarian politician

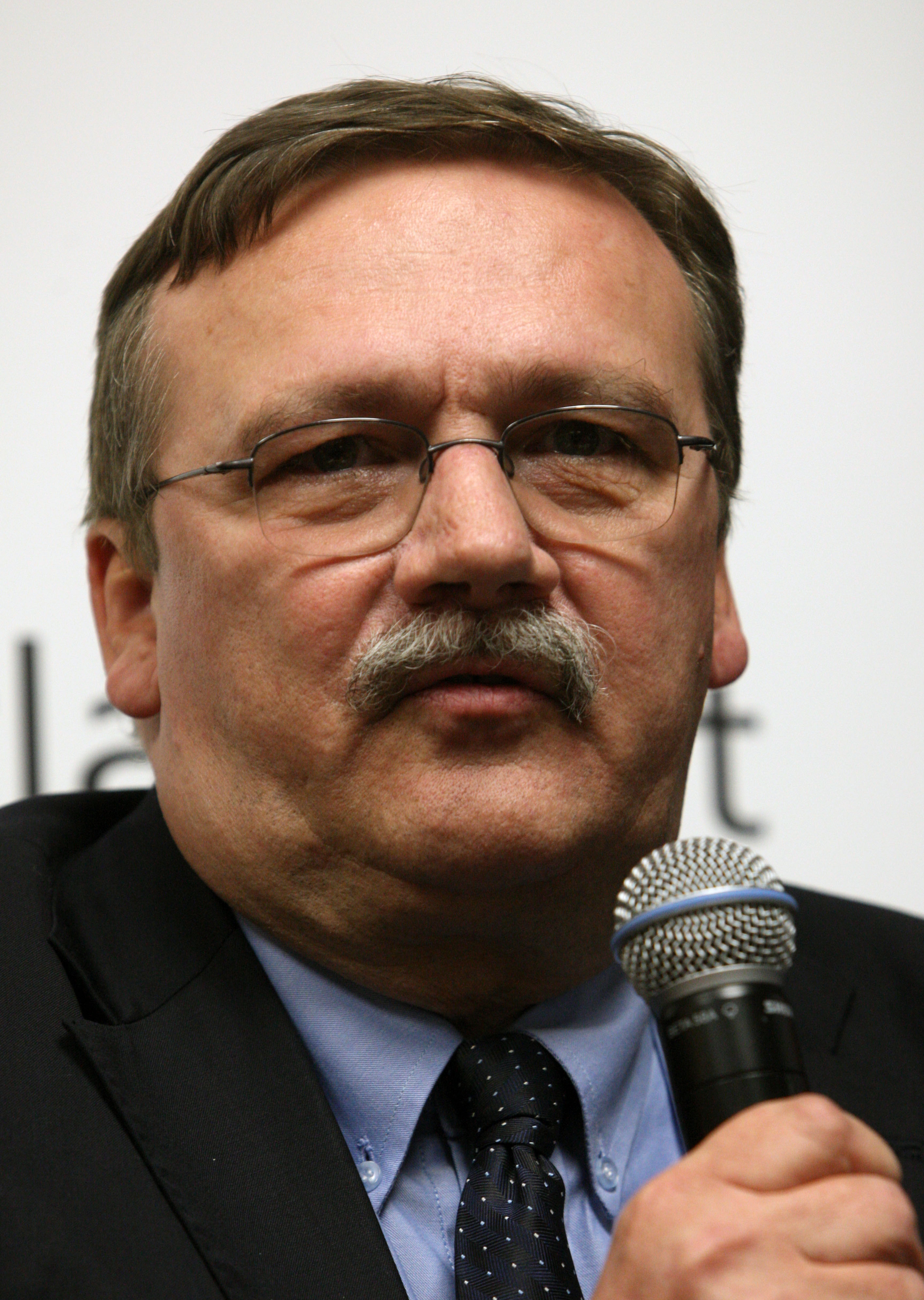
Csaba Őry

Dr Csaba Őry (born 12 May 1952, in Budapest) is a Hungarian politician and Member of the European Parliament (MEP) with the Fidesz, part of the European People's Party. He sits on the European Parliament's Committee on Employment and Social Affairs.

Őry is a substitute for the Committee on Development and a member of the Delegation to the EU-Former Yugoslav Republic of Macedonia Joint Parliamentary Committee.

== Personal life ==
He is married. His wife is Tamara Illényi. They have two daughters, Katalin and Annamária.

== Education ==
- 1978: PhD, Political Science and Law

== Career ==
- since 1988: Founder and spokesman of the Democratic Union of Scientific Workers
- Administrator and Vice-Chairman (1988–1993), Chairman (1994), LIGA trade unions
- since 1996: Head, Employment Policy and Labour Affairs Workshop, FIDESZ party
- Member of the Hungarian Parliament, Political Undersecretary of State, Ministry of Social and Family Affairs
- since 1998: political Undersecretary of State, Prime Minister's Office
- Member of the Hungarian Parliament, Vice-Chairman of the Committee on Employment
- 1998–2004: Member of the Budapest Board
- 1998: Vice-Chairman of the Committee on Employment and Labour Affairs
- since 2002: Vice-Chairman of the Committee on Employment and Labour Affairs, Chairman, Hungarian-Vietnamese-Cambodian-Laotian Section, IPU
- 1998–2000: Political Undersecretary of State, Social and Family Affairs Ministry
- 2000–2002: Political Undersecretary of State, Prime Minister's Office
- 1999–2002: Representative of the Hungarian Government to the ILO (1998–2002), Chairman of the Hungarian National Council for the ILO
- 2003–2004: Observer at the European Parliament
- 1998–1999: Member of the Governing Body, ILO
- 1999: Chairman of the Resolution Committee, ILO Conference
- 1998–2002: Chairman of the Subcommittee on Social Affairs of the Slovak-Hungarian Joint Committee

== See also ==
- 2004 European Parliament election in Hungary
