= András Gyürk =

Hungarian politician (born 1972)

András Gyürk MEP
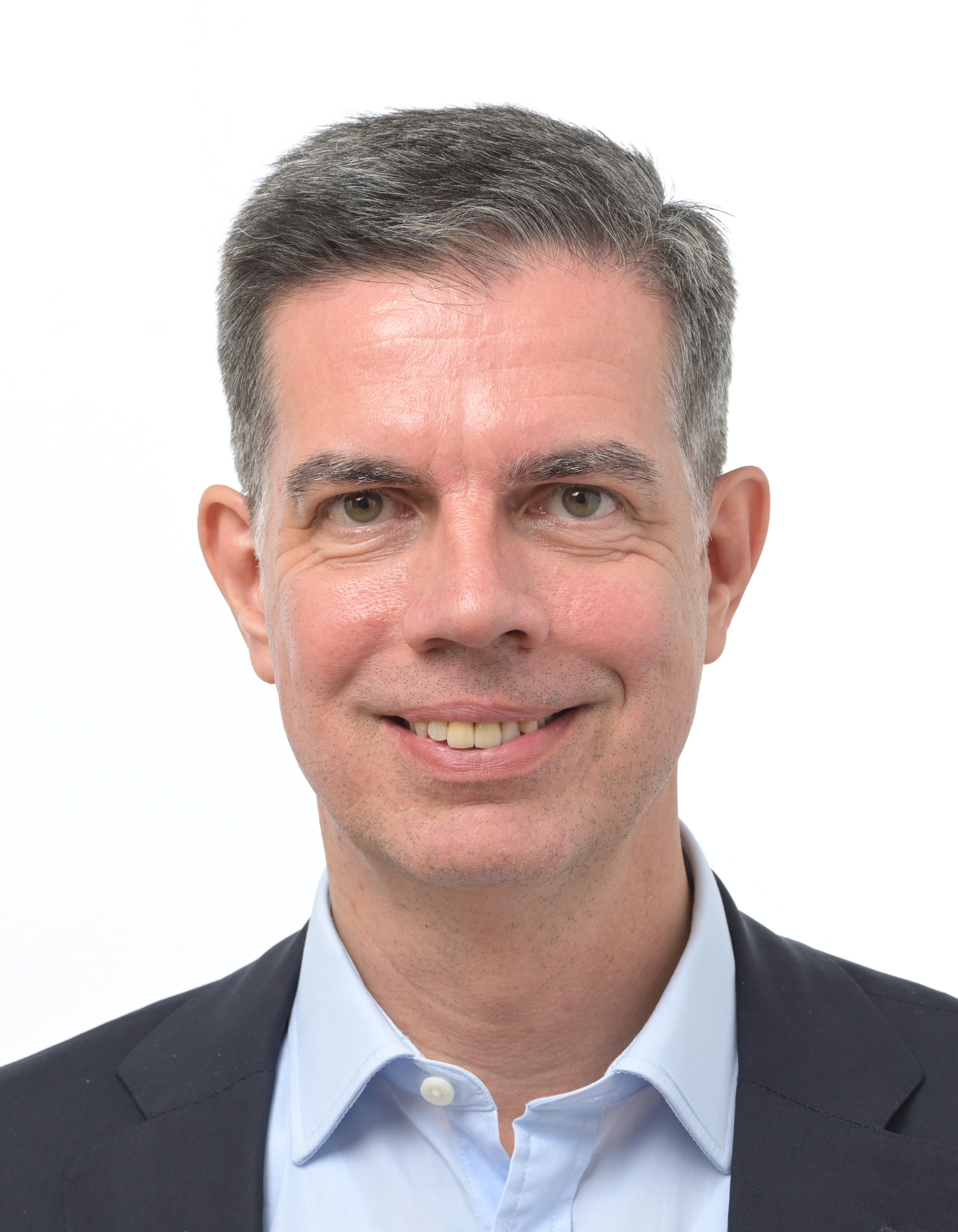

Member of the European Parliament
- Incumbent
- Assumed office 1 July 2004
- Constituency: Hungary

Personal details
- Born: 2 December 1972 (age 53) Budapest, Hungary
- Party: Hungarian: Fidesz; EU: Patriots for Europe
- Children: 2
- Education: University of Budapest

András János Gyürk (born 2 December 1972, Budapest) is a Hungarian politician and Member of the European Parliament (MEP) from Hungary. He is a member of Fidesz, part of the Patriots for Europe.

Gyürk is a substitute for the Committee on Industry, Research and Energy. Gyürk is a member of the Delegation to the EU-Armenia, EU-Azerbaijan and the EU-Georgia Parliamentary Cooperation Committees, substitute for the Delegation for relations with the Arab Peninsula and the Delegation to the Euronest Parliamentary Assembly.

He is married with two children.

== Education ==
- 1993 – 1998 Eötvös Loránd University (Budapest), Faculty of Humanities (History)
- 1991 – 1993 College of Finance and Accountancy
- 1987 – 1991 Franciscan Secondary School (Szentendre)

== Political activity ==
- 2004 – Member of the European Parliament
- 2002 – 2004 Deputy leader, parliamentary faction of Fidesz
- 2002 – 2004 Vice chairman, Committee on Youth and Sport, Hungarian Parliament
- 1998 – 1999 Member of the Parliamentary Assembly, Council of Europe (Committee on Migration)
- 1998 – 2004 Member of the Hungarian Parliament (Committee on Foreign Affairs, Committee on Youth and Sport)
- 1996 – 2004 Chairman of Fidelitas (Youth organization of Fidesz)
- 1995 – 2004 Member of the national board of Fidesz
- 1988 – Member of Fidesz

== Other activities ==
- 1995 – 2000 Member of the Pastoral Council, Archdiocese of Esztergom-Budapest
- 1998 – 2004 Director of Democracy After Communism Foundation

== See also ==
- 2004 European Parliament election in Hungary

Party political offices
Preceded by New party	President of Fidelitas; 1996–2005	Succeeded by Péter Szijjártó
