= Hungary (European Parliament constituency) =

Constituency of the European Parliament

- European Parliament constituency
- Location among the current constituencies
- Member state: Hungary
- Created: 2004
- MEPs: 24 (2004–2009); 22 (2009–2014); 21 (2014–present)

Hungary is a European Parliament constituency for elections in the European Union covering the member state of Hungary. It is currently represented by twenty-one Members of the European Parliament.

== Electoral system ==
Hungary uses closed-list type of party-list proportional representation to elect MEPs with the D'Hondt method of allocating seats to parties.

== Elections ==
=== 2004 ===
The 2004 European election was the sixth election to the European Parliament. As Hungary had only joined the European Union earlier that month, it was the first election European election held in that state. The election took place on 13 June 2004.

=== 2009 ===
The 2009 European election was the seventh election to the European Parliament and the second for Hungary. The number of seats was reduced to twenty–two.

=== 2014 ===
The 2014 European election was the eighth election to the European Parliament and the third for Hungary. The number of seats was reduced to twenty–one.

=== 2019 ===
The 2019 European election was the ninth election to the European Parliament and the fourth for Hungary.

=== 2024 ===
The 2024 European election was the tenth election to the European Parliament and the fifth for Hungary.
