= Lilla Polyák =

Hungarian actress and singer

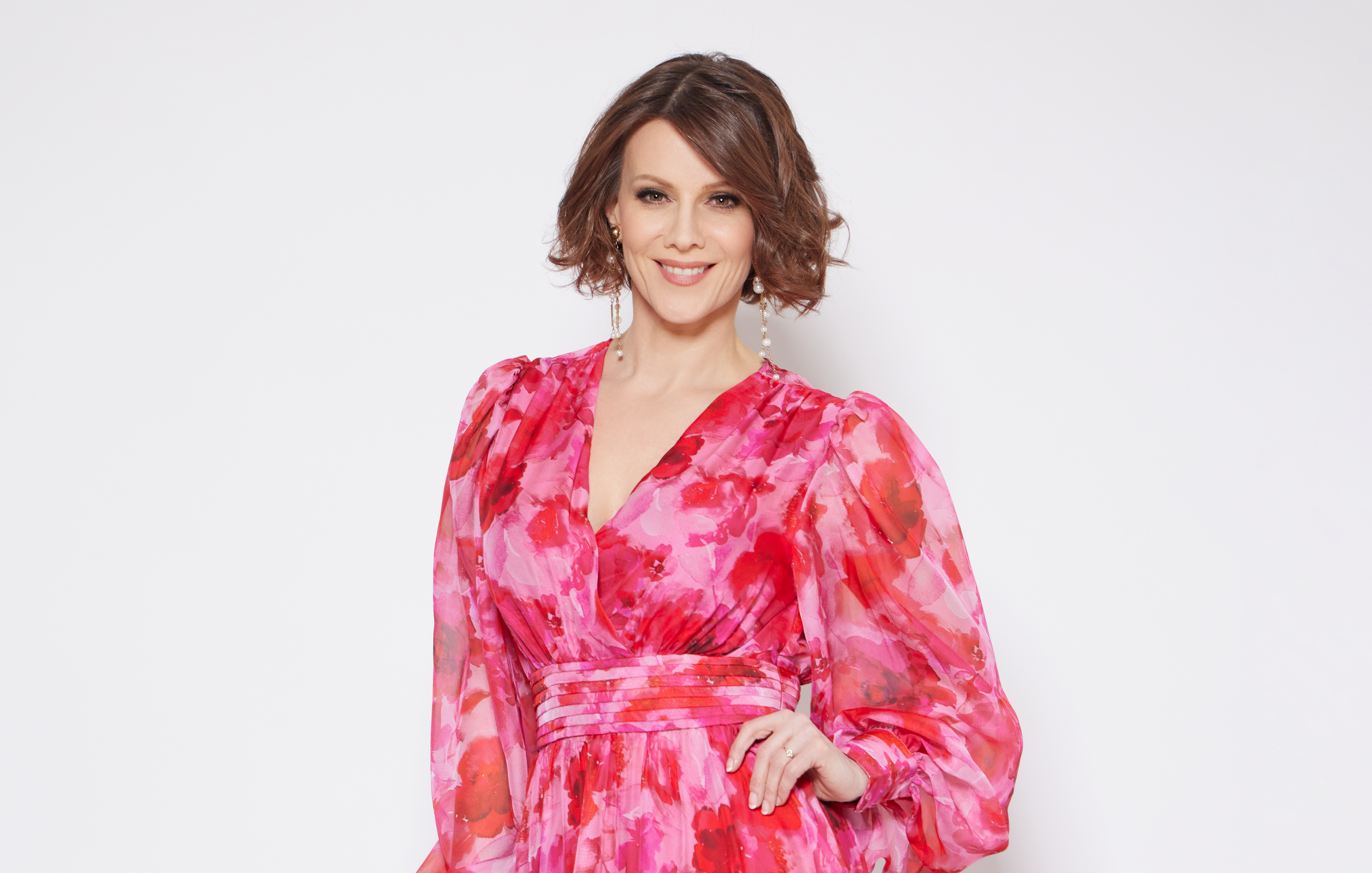
- Lilla Polyák photographed by Zoltán Sárosi
- Born: 16 March 1976; Győr, Hungary
- Occupations: Actress; singer
- Spouses: András Máté Gömöri (m. 2018) Zsolt Homonnay (m. 2000; div. 2016)
- Children: Zsombor Homonnay; Bulcsú Homonnay

Lilla Polyák (born 16 March 1976) is a Hungarian actress and singer.

== Personal life ==
Her 2021 song titled Stay (Maradj) was inspired by the loss of her father, Dr. Zoltán Polyák (1952–1987). Her mother is Márta Botos (Mrs. Zoltán Polyák). She has a younger brother, Zoltán.

She was still a pupil of Géza Gárdonyi Elementary School in Győr when she started participating in poem and prose recital competitions. She started her secondary education in Miklós Révai High School in Győr. This is where she became interested in music and singing, and decided to become a professional singer and musical actress. To realize her dream, in 1993 at the age of 17 she moved to Budapest, and graduated from Madách Imre High School (Madách Imre Gimnázium) in 1994.

Her first husband was Zsolt Homonnay, with whom they had two children, Zsombor (2004) and Bulcsú (2007). They divorced in 2016. She married her second husband, András Máté Gömöri, in 2018.

In 2016 the Hungarian Tourism Agency appointed her the #helloHungary ambassador for the city of Sopron and the Lake Fertő region.

== Theatre career ==
Having graduated from high school, she spent a year with the National Theatre of Győr, where she primarily played in musicals while preparing for her entrance exams.

Despite her musical inclination, she was admitted to the prose department of the University of Theatre and Film Arts in Budapest in 1995. During her apprenticeship in Comedy Theatre of Budapest, she already took on main roles, such as Dorothy in The Wizard of Oz. She graduated from university in 1999. As she was fluent in German, Theater an der Wien, a Vienna-based theatre of Vereinigte Bühnen, signed her in the same year. She returned to Hungary at the end of 2001. She has played roles both in musicals and plays in Budapest as well as in the countryside. She has taken on the role of Mary Magdalene in Jesus Christ Superstar twice, and has toured with the musical The Beauty and the Beast in Austria, Germany, and Switzerland. She has starred in acclaimed musicals such as Romeo and Juliet, Joseph and the Amazing Technicolor Dreamcoat, Spamalot, Mary Poppins, the stage adaptation of Federico Fellini’s 8½ titled Nine, and Jekyll & Hyde.

She received a Gundel Award in the musical-operetta category in 2007. On 24 October 2022, the day that celebrates the Hungarian operetta, the Budapest Operetta Theater presented her with the Best Actress of the Season award.

In addition to her theatre roles, she has appeared on the television screen. She competed in the Hungarian musical talent show Sztárban Sztár (A Star within a Star), and has hosted a TV show herself. She starred in two seasons of the Hungarian comedy show series Mintaapák (Great Fathers/Sres. Papis). She has also done commercial work.

Between 2017 and 2020 she was the head musical teacher of the musical training offered by the Pesti Magyar Academy of Drama at the Magyar Theatre, the successor of the Nemzeti Stúdió (Academy of the National Theatre).

She has also narrated several audiobooks.

== Singing career ==
As a singer she sang in numerous animated films, and has collaborated on multiple musical albums. In 2008 she won the pop music game show Csináljuk a fesztivált! (Let's party!) broadcast by the Magyar Televízió for performing Barbra Streisand’s hit a Woman in Love.

In 1993 she was still in high school when she became the singer of an emerging band from Győr, which even performed at a rock festival. She soon moved to Budapest, and applied to the private school of singer and singing teacher Mária Toldy. In her third year at the University of Theatre and Film Arts in Budapest she sang in a show. It was then that she began performing in various musical productions with her first husband, Zsolt Homonnay. They released two albums together. Two of Us (Ketten, 2009) and Two Hearts (Két szív, 2010) were both certified gold records.

During her time in Vienna at the turn of the millennium, she toured with an ABBA Tribute Show with a German theatre company. Later, in the spring of 2010 she and Kata Janza debuted a show featuring ABBA songs and musical pieces which they have been performing country-wide ever since.

In 2011 her song titled Here and Now (Itt és most) was 70 th in the Radio Top 100, which was compiled based on listening numbers. She has performed twice in the Hungarian selection for the Eurovision Song Contest. In 2013 the song I Gotta Fly (composers: Máté Bella, Vajk Szente, and Attila Galambos; Hungarian version: Valami más), in 2014 her song Rise Again (composers: Gergő Rácz, Viktor Rakonczai, and Zsolt Homonnay; Hungarian version: Karcolás) got her to the first semi-finals of the selection show A Dal.

In 2014 her first solo greatest hits album Most és Mindörökké was released by Sony Music Entertainment Hungary.

In 2019 she judged the song contest Kötéltánc held by the Capital Circus of Budapest.

== Awards ==
- Gundel Art Award (2007)
- The Musical Acting Award of the Season (2022)

== Theatrical roles ==
Authors	Title	Role	Theatre	Year
Vajk Szente, Attila Galambos, Levente Juhász	Kőszívű	Mrs. Baradlay	József Katona Theatre of Kecskemét	2022
	Kőszívű – A Baradlay-legenda	Mrs. Baradlay	Erkel Theatre	2022
Robert Louis Stevenson, Frank Wildhorn, Leslie Bricusse	Jekyll & Hyde	Lucy Harris	Budapest Operetta Theater	2022
Choderlos de Laclos, Csaba Kiss, Adrián Kovács, Péter Sziámi Müller	Les Liaisons Dangereuses	Marquise de Merteuil	Budapest Operetta Theater	2022
Michael Kunze, Sylvester Levay	Elisabeth	Elisabeth	József Katona Theatre of Kecskemét	2021
Arthur Kopit, Maury Yeston	Nine	Claudia Nardi	Budapest Operetta Theater	2021
Patricia Resnick, Dolly Parton, Vajk Szente, Attila Galambos	9 to 5 (musical)	Violet	Attila József Theatre	2020
Gregg Opelka, Attila Galambos	C'est la vie	Fatiguée	Pinceszínház	2019
Richard Rodgers, Oscar Hammerstein, Ferenc Molnár's Liliom	Carousel - Liliom	Mrs. Mullin	Budapest Operetta Theater	2019
Richard Rodgers és Oscar Hammerstein, Molnár Ferenc	Carousel - Liliom	Nettie Fowler	Budapest Operetta Theater	2019
	A date in paris with Lilla Polyák and Zsolt Homonnay	self	Budapest Operetta Theater	2019
Levente Szörényi, János Bródy	István, a király	Sarolt	Budapest Operetta Theater	2018
Mihály Kalpintér, Bálin Varga	The Houdini Musical	Bess	MoM Sport	2016
Szilveszter Lévay, Michael Kunze	Marie Antoinette	Marie Antoinette	Budapest Operetta Theater	2016
Menken-Ashman-Rice	A Szépség és a Szörnyeteg	Teamama	Budapest Operetta Theater	2014
Gyárfás-Szabó-Szente	Tanulmány a nőkről	Balogh Éva	Madách Theatre	2014
Eszter Horgas	Hét boszorka concert performance	one of the omniscient witches	Centrál Theater (premiere: Margaret Island Open-Air Stage)	2013 (2012)
Disney-Cameron-Mackintosh	Mary Poppins	Mary Poppins	Madách Theatre	2012
Vizy-Tóth	Én, József Attila	Flóra Kozmutza	Madách Theatre	2012
Galambos-Szente-Bolba	Csoportterápia	Natasa	Madách Theatre	2011
Webber-Rice	Jesus Christ Superstar	Mary Magdalene	Madách Theatre	2010
Lévay-Kunze	Rebecca-A Manderley-ház asszonya	Mrs. Danvers	Budapest Operetta Theater	2010
Idle-Du Prez	Spamalot, avagy a Gyalog Galopp	The Lady of the Lake	Madách Theatre	2009
	Musicalmesék	Tündér Lilla	Budapest Operetta Theater	2009
Gérard Presgurvic, Shakespeare	Romeo and Juliet	Juliet's nanny	Budapest Operetta Theater	2008
Webber-Rice	Joseph and the Amazing Technicolor Dreamcoat	Narrator	Madách Theatre	2008
Wildhorn-Murphy	Rudolf – Az utolsó csók	Stefánia	Budapest Operetta Theater	2006
Menken-Ashman-Rice	The Beauty and the Beast	Madame de la Grande Bouche	Budapest Operetta Theater	2005
Webber-Elton-Bródy	Volt egyszer egy csapat	Christine	Madách Theatre	2005
Gérard Presgurvic, Shakespeare	Romeo and Juliet	Lady Capulet	Budapest Operetta Theater	2004
LaChiusa	Helló! Igen?!	A színésznő	Budapest Operetta Theater	2004
Lévay-Kunze	Mozart!	Waldstätten bárónő	Budapest Operetta Theater	2003
Larson	Robbanás előtt (Tick, tick... boom)	Susan	National Theatre of Pécs	2003
Lévay-Kunze	Elisabeth	Sissi	Budapest Operetta Theater	2002
Böhm-Korcsmáros-Horváth	Somewhere in Europe	Éva	National Theatre of Pécs	2002
Kocsák-Miklós	Anna Karenina	Anna Karenina	Madách Theatre	2002
Isherwood-Kander-Ebb	Kabaré	Sally Bowles	Csokonai Theatre, Debrecen	2002
Werner Sobotka	Moby Dick		Musical Sommer Amstetten	2001
Lévay-Kunze	Mozart!	Waldstätten bárónő	Theater an der Wien	2000
Webber-Arlen-Rice-Harburg	The Wizard of Oz	Dorothy	Comedy Theatre of Budapest	1998
Presser-Sztevanovity-Horváth	A padlás	Kölyök	National Theatre of Győr	1995

== Filmography ==
=== Film ===
Title	Role	Genre	Type	Year
Igazából apa	Emma	Comedy	Feature film	2010
Made in Hungaria	Maxim, Red Knight	Biography, Comedy, Music	Feature film	2009
Közel a szerelemhez		Drama	Feature film	1999

=== Television ===
Title	Role	Genre/type	Channel	Year
Mintaapák	Klára	TV Series	TV2	2019–2021
Karádysokk	Dorottya	TV Series	Duna (TV channel)	2011

=== Movie Soundtrack ===
- Enchanted (Most és mindörökké - Ever Ever After, 2007)
- Home on the Range (Tenyérnyi kis égbolt - Little Patch of Heaven, 2004)
- Brother Bear (2003/2004)
- The Emperor's New Groove (2000)

== Discography ==
With credits on several musical and concert CDs too.

=== Album ===
- Most és Mindörökké (2014)
- Két szív (with Homonnay Zsolt, 2010)
- Ketten (with Homonnay Zsolt, 2009)

=== Single ===
- Maradj (2021)
- Ever Ever After (2015)
- Ecset és vászon (2015)
- Egyetlen szó (Feat. Gergő Rácz, 2014)
- Rise Again (2014)
- White Christmas (2013)
- Legyen ünnep (2013)
- Tél, amit ígértél (2013)
- Karcolás (2013)
- Valami más|Valami más / I Gotta Fly (2013)

=== Audiobook ===
Pamela Lyndon Travers

- Mary Poppins a Cseresznyefa utcában (E-Audiobook: 2022)
- A csudálatos Mary Poppins (2019, E-Audiobook: 2021
- Mary Poppins a Parkban (2018, E-Audiobook: 2021)
- A csudálatos Mary kinyitja az ajtót (2017, E-Audiobook: 2022)
- A csudálatos Mary visszatér (2016, E-Audiobook: 2021

Szilvia K. László

- Marci és az évszakok (2016)
