= László T. Ágoston =

Hungarian writer and publicist

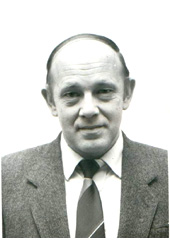
Image of T. Ágoston Lászlo

László T. Ágoston (born 14 October 1942, Tass) is a Hungarian writer and publicist, founding member of the Gyula Krúdy Club of Literature, member of the Hungarian Writers' Union, author of numerous books, progeny of General János Lenkey, researcher of the Hungarian Revolution of 1848.

An acclaimed novelist, his best-known work is his novel, A Két Lenkey, about a group of Hungarian Hussars leaving their post in Poland returning to Hungary to join the war of independence. After it had been published Ágoston gave several lectures in universities, became special member of the Lenkey Cultural Association.

His son, László Ágoston, is a baritone opera singer, classical musical manager (Kayamar), and founder and general manager of the Moltopera Company.

== His life ==
=== The publicist ===
Ágoston learned joinery in his father's yard (this experience inspirated later many of his novels) but left his family soon moving to Budapest. Because of his opposition to the ruling communist system he was able to start his university studies much later, just in the 1970s. He worked mainly as a journalist in smaller newspapers, but his novellas were published frequently also in the most prestigious Hungarian magazines.

=== Writer ===
He was discovered by József Kopré (former associate of Zsigmond Móricz) leading to his first publication in 1966 that was followed by more than 1000 others in newspapers and magazines. Although his writings were selected for 25 anthologies his first book was published just in 2001. Founding member, the first secretary general of the Gyula Krúdy Club of Literature in 1982 after the political changes in 1989 became a member of the Hungarian Writers' Union, in 1991-1992 advisory board member in the Writer's Foundation. He gained more and more recognition after his first novel "Hol lakik az Isten?" was published in 2001.

== Awards ==
- Krúdy Medallion (1989)
- Certificate of merit from the Free Hungarian Writer's Association /Washington/ (1999)
- National Milleniumarian Contest - special prize (2000)
- Prize in the contest of the Magyar Rádió (2002)
- Fehér Mária-prize (2005)

== Books published ==
- Hol lakik az Isten? (2001)
- Aranyka (2001)
- Kinek dolgozik az idő (2004)
- Ördögszekér (2004)
- Egy pohár vihar (2004)
- A két Lenkey (2005)
- Eltékozolt évek (2008)
- Lenkey huszárok (2009)
- Bumeráng (2009)
- Csendélet tigrissel - Történetek Durciról (2010)
- A bicskafaló csuka (2011)
- Nömös tassi novellák (2011)
- A bicskafaló csuka (2011)
- A négylábú ember (2012)
- A király nem meztelen (2013)
- Napijegy a holtágra (2014)
- Tapicskoló (2014)
