= Renáta Göncz =

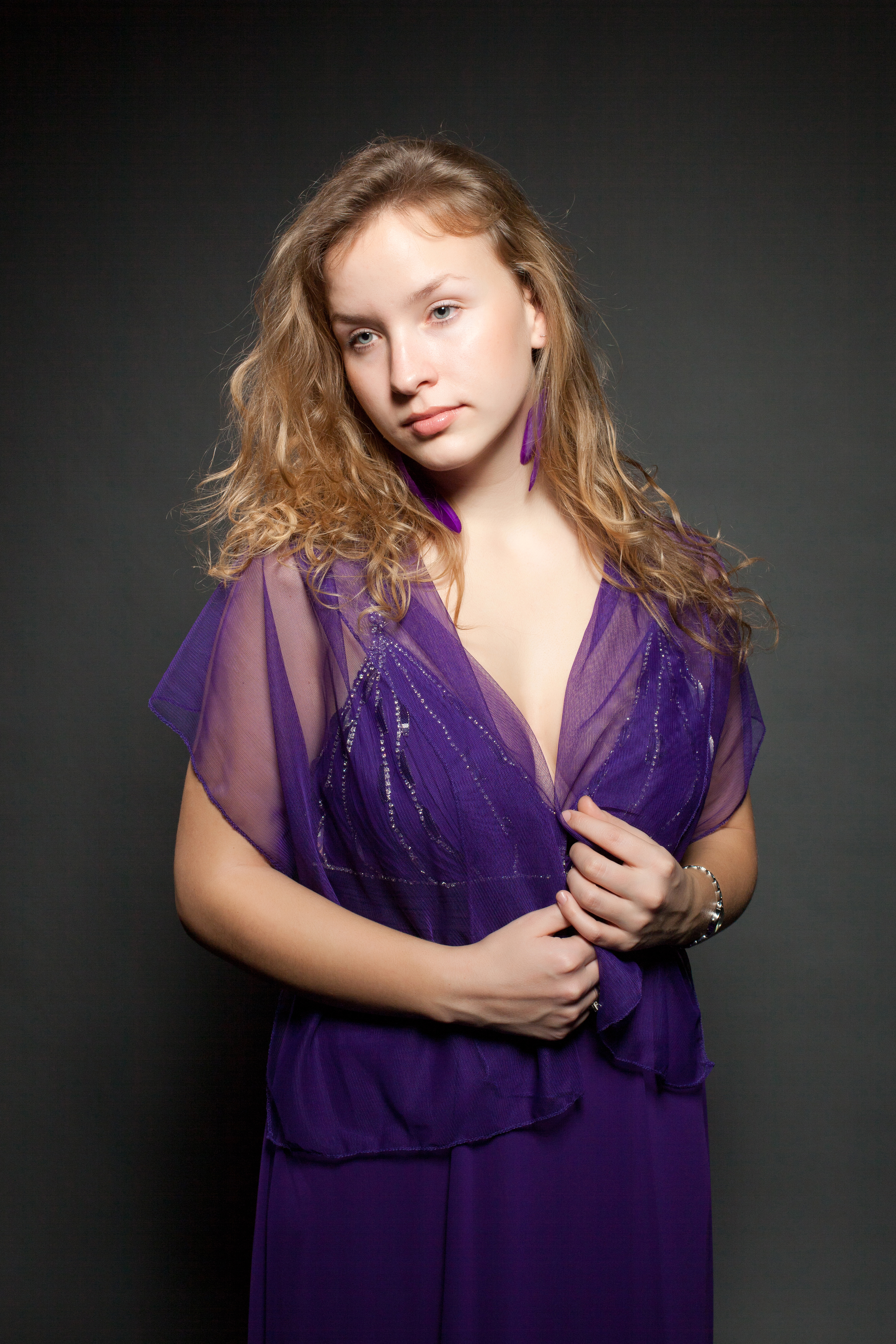

Background information
- Born: May 16, 1991 (age 35)
- Origin: Ajka, Hungary
- Genres: opera, jazz, pop, a cappella
- Occupation: musician
- Instrument: singing
- Years active: 2008 –present)
- Website: gonczrenata.hu

Renáta Göncz (born 16 May 1991) is a Hungarian lyric soprano, opera singer, founding member of the Moltopera Company, and regular partner of Kayamar.

== Biography ==
=== Early years ===
Renáta Göncz was born in 1991 in the Hungarian countryside, in Ajka. She has learnt piano from the age of 7. Multiple conservatoires would have liked her to admit but she decided to continue her musical studies with singing. Her last amateur success has proven her right: she won the 1st prize of the Jenő Ádám Vocal Competition and two special prizes in addition. She wasn't even 18 years old when she sang first in the famous X. room of the Franz Liszt Academy of Music in front of Éva Marton and the teaching staff. She graduated in 2013.

=== Moltopera ===
She has been member of the Moltopera Company since the very beginning, debuting with the role of Zerlina from Mozart's Don Giovanni on 15 February 2012. She sang various roles including Pamina (Mozart - The Magic Flute), Lola (Mascagni - Cavalleria Rusticana) and Lauretta (Puccini - Gianni Schicchi) in various concert halls like the Palace of Arts, the Sziget Festival, or the National Theater of Pécs.

=== As a concert soloist ===
She has been the soloist of numerous concerts in Hungary, the Netherlands, Austria, Sweden or Germany. In 2012 she sang the soprano solo of Mendelssohn's 55, psalm with the Budapest Academic Choir Society.

=== Kayamar and the popular genre ===
Despite being an opera singer she has sung many times in pop and jazz concerts, as well. She is a regular guest in the concerts of Kayamar since 2011, who composes a big number of songs directly to her voice. She also took part on Kayamar's first CD with the two bonus tracks. In the Sziget Festival 2012 she stepped on stage two times with operatic repertoire and three times with improvisations and pop in the shows of Kayamar. She is also regular special guest of the Windsingers a cappella group.

== Awards ==
- Magda Lantos piano competition - gold
- Jenő Ádám National Vocal Competition - I. prize and 2 special prizes
