= Kinga Gál =

Hungarian politician

Kinga Gál MEP
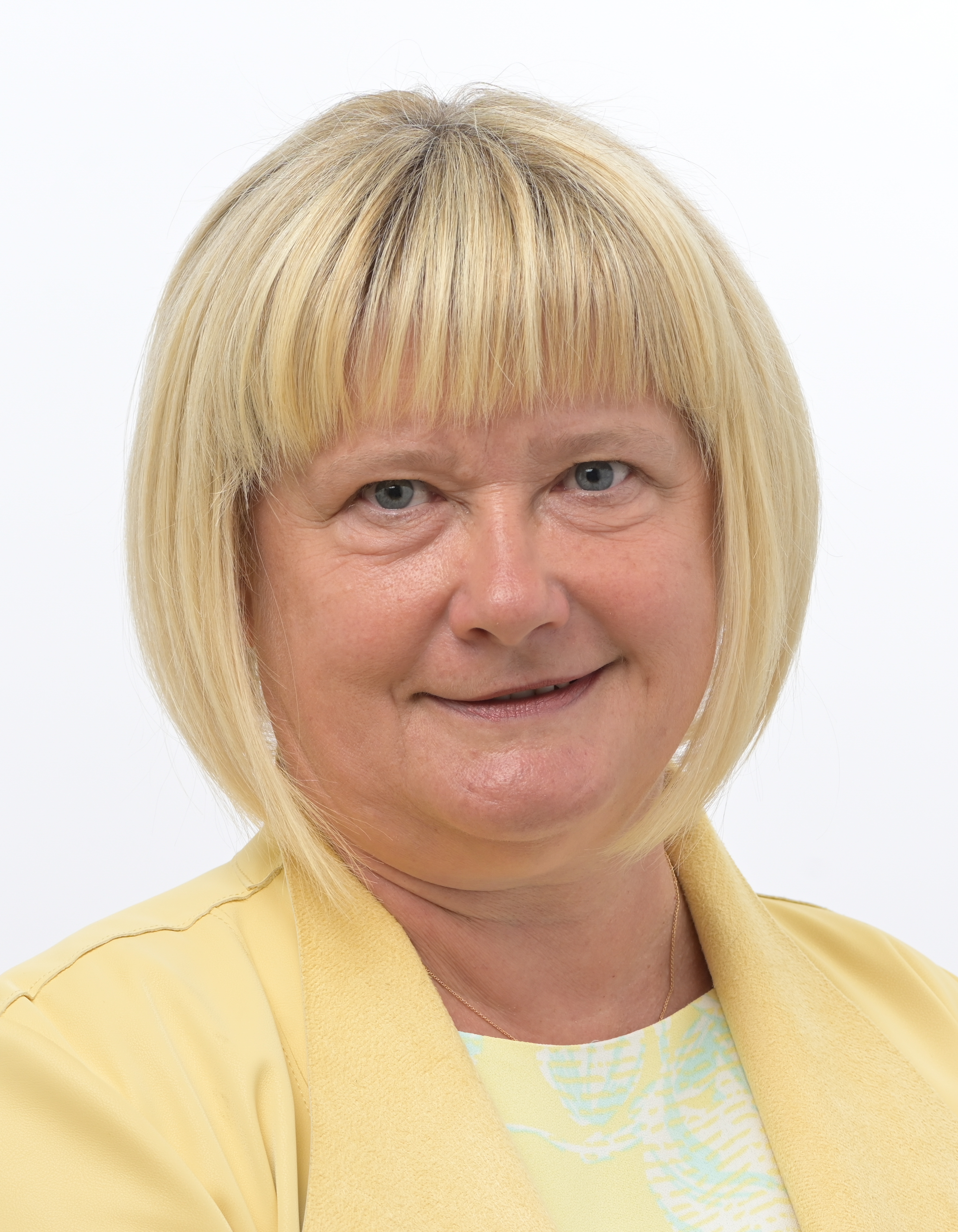
- Gál in 2024

Member of the European Parliament
- Incumbent
- Assumed office 1 July 2004
- Constituency: Hungary

Personal details
- Born: 6 September 1970 (age 56) Cluj-Napoca, SR Romania
- Citizenship: Hungary • Romania
- Party: Fidesz
- Education: Eötvös Loránd University
- Website: gal.fidesz-eu.hu/en

Kinga Gál (born 6 September 1970) is a Hungarian politician and Member of the European Parliament (MEP). She is a member of Fidesz.

== Early life and education ==
Gál was born in Cluj-Napoca, SR Romania and moved to Hungary in 1986. She graduated from the Institute for Comparative Human Rights in Strasbourg with a diploma of International Human Rights in 1993 and from the Political Science and Law Department of Eötvös Loránd University in 1994.

== Career ==
From 1991 until 1994, Gál was an advisor to the Democratic Alliance of Hungarians in Romania. In 1995, she worked as an analyst for the Government Office for Hungarian Minorities Abroad and in 1996 as a researcher for the Teleki Foundation. From 1997 until 2000, she was an international legal expert at the European Centre for Minority Issues in Flensburg. Between 2001 and 2002, she served as the vice-chairman of the Government Office for Hungarian Minorities Abroad. Gál was appointed chief advisor to the president of the Hungarian Academy of Sciences in 2003.

=== European Parliament ===
Gál has been a Member of the European Parliament since the 2004 European Parliament Election in Hungary. From 2015 until 2019 she was the vice-president of the European People's Party. In 2014, she received the annual MEP Award for Justice and Civil Liberties, awarded by Parliament Magazine.

She currently serves as the First Vice-Chair of the Patriots for Europe Group and Vice-President of the Patriots.eu party. Since 2021, she also serves as Vice-President of FIDESZ - Hungarian Civic Union.

==== Committees and delegations ====
Gál is currently a member of the Committee on Foreign Affairs, where she is also part of the DASE Delegation for relations with Southeast Asia and the Association of Southeast Asian Nations (ASEAN).

Additionally, she is the Honorary President of the Intergroup on Traditional Minorities, National Communities and Languages.

== Personal life ==
She is married and mother of four sons.

== Publications ==
- "Önrendelkezés és önkormányzatiság Kossuth felfogásában, 1861" (in Hungarian). Pro Minoritate. Budapest. 1991.
- "Kisebbségvédelem a nemzetközi jogban, Magyar Kisebbség" ["Protection of Minorities in International Law – The Hungarian Minority"] (in Hungarian). II évfolyam, 1-2 szám, Kolozsvár. 1996.
- "A Román Parlament elé terjesztett kisebbségi törvény-tervezetek összehasonlítása" (in Hungarian). Magyar Kisebbség, III. évfolyam, 1-2 szám, pp. 244–255, Kolozsvár. 1997.
- "Bilateral Agreements in Central and Eastern Europe: A New Inter-State Framework for Minority Protection?". European Centre for Minority Issues Working Paper # 4. p. 22. Flensburg, Germany. May 1999.
- "Implementing the Framework Convention for the Protection of National Minorities". Co-author: María Amor Martín Estébanez. Flensburg, Germany, 12–14 June 1998. European Centre for Minority Issues Report #3. p. 96. August 1999.
- "The role of the bilateral treaties in the protection of national minorities in Central and Eastern Europe". Helsinki Monitor, Quarterly on Security and Cooperation in Europe. Volume 10, No.3, pp. 73–90, 1999.
- "Minoritätenprobleme in Ungarn und Rumänien". In Neuss, Beate, Peter Jurczek and Wolfram Hilz (eds.) Transformationsprozesse im suedlichen Mitteleuropa — Ungarn und Rumänien. Beiträge zu einem politik- und regional-wissenschaftlichen Symposium an der TU Chemnitz. Occasional papers no. 20, Tuebingen: Europäisches Zentrum für Föderalismus- Forschung. pp. 31–41. 1999.
- "Innere Selbstbestimmung — Aktuelle Autonomiekonzepte der Minderheiten in Rumanien". In Löwe, Tontsch und Troebst, Minderheiten, Regionalbewusstsein und Zentralismus in Ostmitteleuropa, Böhlau Verlag Köln Weimar Wien. 2000.
- "The New Slovak language law: Internal or External Politics?". Co-author: Farimah Daftary. European Centre for Minority Issues Working Paper # 8. pp. 71. Flensburg, Germany. September 2000.
- "The Council of Europe's Framework Convention for the Protection of National Minorities and its Impact on Central and Eastern Europe". Journal on Ethnopolitics and Minority Issues in Europe. Winter 2000.
- "Legal and Political Aspects of Protecting Minorities in Southeastern Europe in the Context of European Enlargement". In Wim van Meurs, Beyond EU Enlargement. Bertelsmann Foundation Publishers, Gütersloh.2001.
- "Aktuelle Autonomiekonzepte ungarischer Minderheiten in Ostmitteleuropa". In Adriányi, Glassl, Völkl, Borbándi, Brunner, Ungarn-Jahrbuch, Zeitschrift für die Kunde Ungarns und verwandte Gebiete. München. 2002.
- "Staatsangehörigkeit in Ungarn heute" ["Nationality in Hungary Today"]. In Osteuropa, Zeitschrift für Gegenwartsfragen des Ostens (in German), 52.Jg., 6/2002. Deutsche Verlags Anstalt, Stuttgart. 2002.
- Minority Governance at the Threshold of the 21st Century (ed.), European Centre for Minority Issues, Flensburg; Open Society Institute, Budapest. October 2002.
- "The European Parliament Intergroup for Traditional Minorities, National Communities and Languages, 2009–2014". Europäisches Journal für Minderheitenfragen, EJM 3–4 (2010). Co-author: Davyth Hicks.
- "National Minorities in Inter-State Relations: Commentary from Country Perspective". In National Minorities in Inter-State Relations, edited by Francesco Palermo — Natalie Sabandze. Leiden, Boston. 2011.
- "Az európai kulturális sokszínűség régi és új arcai". In Örökség a jövőnek — Nemzetközi Konferencia, Magyar Országgyűlés, November 2010, előadások, Budapest. 2011.
- "Traditional Minorities, National Communities and Languages – the issues raised in the European Parliament Intergroup 2009-2011" (PDF format). Co-authors: Davyth Hicks, Eplényi Kata. Published by Kinga Gál, Brussels. December 2011.

== See also ==
- List of Hungarian people
- Members of the European Parliament for Hungary 2004–2009
- Members of the European Parliament for Hungary 2009–2014
- Members of the European Parliament for Hungary 2014-2019
- Members of the European Parliament for Hungary 2019-2024
