= Máté Bella =

Hungarian composer and professor (born 1985)

- Bella Máté
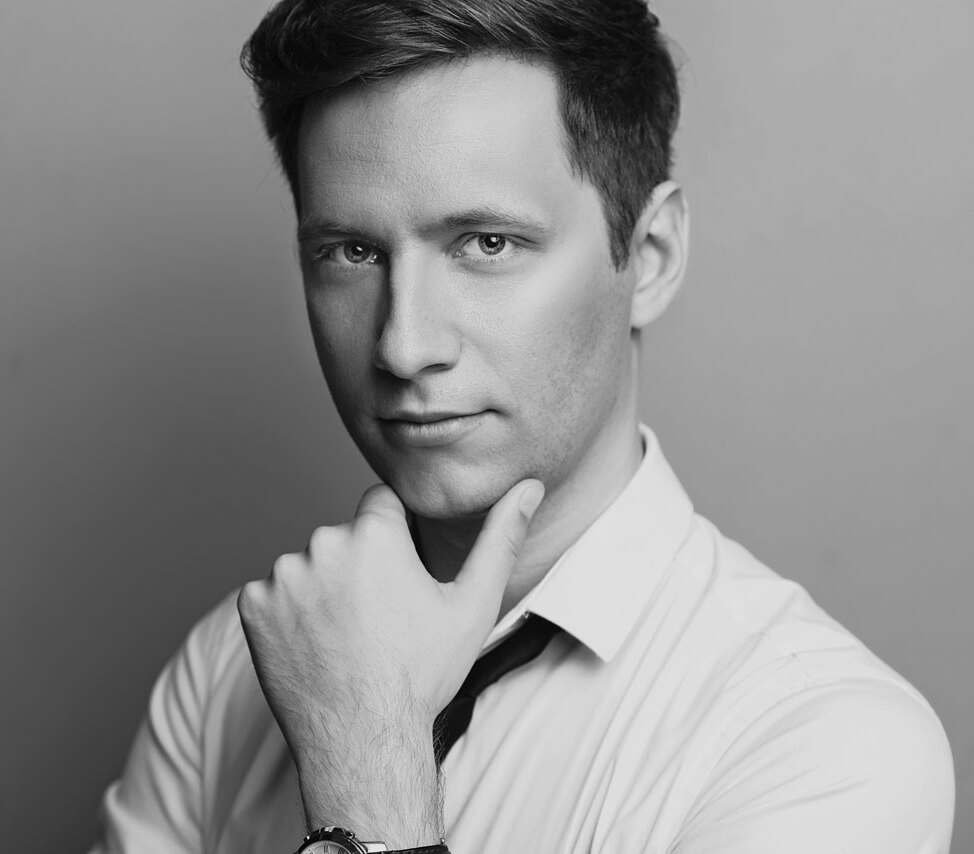
- Bella in 2016
- Born: 28 November 1985 (age 40); Budapest, Hungary
- Education: Béla Bartók Music Institute, Franz Liszt Academy of Music, Krzysztof Penderecki Academy of Music
- Occupations: Composer; university lecturer
- Years active: 2002–present

Máté Bella (Hungarian: Bella Máté, [ˈmaːteː ˈbɛlːɒ]; born 28 November 1985) is a Hungarian composer and university professor at the Franz Liszt Academy of Music in Hungary. He has worked across multiple genres of music, including classical contemporary, opera, choir, musicals, theater music and pop music.

== Early life and education ==
Máté Bella was born 28 November 1985 in Budapest, Hungary.

Bella began his musical studies at Ferenc Erkel Primary School for Music. He later attended the Weiner Leó Secondary Music School in Budapest, where he specialized in composition and piano. He continued his music education between 2002 and 2006 at the Béla Bartók Music Institute, where he focused on composition under the mentorship of Miklós Kocsár. After graduating in 2006, he was admitted to the Franz Liszt Academy of Music, where he completed his studies in 2011. In 2013, he spent a semester at the Krzysztof Penderecki Academy of Music in Kraków on an Erasmus scholarship. Máté was awarded a scholarship for the New National Excellence Program in 2017, and in 2018, he received his summa cum laude doctoral degree.

== Career ==
In 2009, he won the New Hungarian Music Forum composer competition, organized by Müpa Budapest and the Budapest Music Center. This was followed by the recognition of his ensemble piece Chuang Tzu's Dream by the International Music Council in Lisbon in 2010. This piece was performed by the London Sinfonietta. That same year he became the first composer to receive the Junior Prima Award, which recognizes individuals under 30 for outstanding achievements in various fields. In 2011, one of his compositions, written for a play at the Hungarian National Theatre, won the Theatre Critics Award. He received the Erkel Ferenc Award in 2016 and the Bartók-Pásztory Award in 2019. His song Mostantól (From Now On), co-written with Gergő Rácz, won the A Dal 2020 competition, receiving the Petőfi Music Award for Song of the Year and the Hungarian Music Awards Fonogram prize for Best Hungarian Modern Pop/Rock Album or Recording of the Year. In 2025, he won the Artisjus Award in the 'Classical Music Work of the Year' category for his composition The Cheerleaders.

Bella is a member of the Artisjus Committee of Classical Music Critics, the Association of Hungarian Composers, and the 'Musician/Composer' section of the Hungarian Film Academy Association. He is also a co-founder of Studio 5, a contemporary composers' group established in 2016.

From 2019 to 2024, he served as a senior lecturer at the Franz Liszt Academy of Music and has been an associate professor since 2024, and he habilitated in 2025.

== Main works ==
=== Chamber music ===
Work	Year
The Butterfly's Dream	2005
Psycho Symbioses	2006
El Tango de Viudas Engañadas	2007
Message, Message 02	2007
Preludes	2007
Insomnia	2008
Insomnia – commentaries	2008
Silk	2008
The Secret	2009
Something happened...	2009
Manifestations	2010
...in paradise	2010
Ritual	2010
Study	2011
Visions	2012
Phantasm	2013
Varródermia	2018
Titan	2020
Fons	2020
Aeolus	2021
Beneath the Starry Night	2021
De Agnete	2021
Monochronic	2022
Judas	2022
Airambulum	2024
The White Chaconne	2024
After the Rain	2025
Stardust	2025
Axis	2026
Sakura	2026

=== Ensemble ===
Work	Year
Equivalence	2007
Chuang Tzu's Dream	2008
Trance	2013
Reflections	2013
Hypnos	2014
Laniakea	2015
Hesperus	2017
The Cheerleaders	2024

=== Orchestral works ===
==== Compositions for orchestra ====
Work	Year
The Night's Monologue	2011
Suite	2012
Sounds of Generation Y	2015
Tabula Smaragdina	2018
Sounds of Generation Y Part II	2018
Love of Hephaestus	2023
Celestial Pathways	2025

==== Compositions for string orchestra ====
Work	Year
Lethe	2014
About Time	2023
After the Rain (for string orchestra and piano)	2025
Ave Maria (for soprano and string orchestra)	2025

=== Vocal music ===
==== Choral works ====
Work	Year
Peace	2013
The Home at Night	2014
Lacrimosa	2015
Eternal Music	2020
O Oriens	2021
Summer Song	2023
Dies Irae	2024

==== Operas ====
Work	Year
Spring Awakening	2012
The Coronation of Poppea^{(L'incoronazione di Poppea)}	2019

==== Musicals ====
Title	Theatre	Premiere
Who the F**k is Lady Domina?	Academy of Drama and Film, Budapest	2009
Better than Sex	Courtyard Theatre, London	2010
The Demon Cat	Madách Theatre, Budapest	2010
The Demon Cat	Budapest Operetta and Musical Theatre	2018
freewill >>>>	Erkel Theatre, Budapest	2023

==== Songs ====
Title	Theatre	Premiere
Aria of the Miller's Daughter^{(A molnárlány áriája)}	Sándor Weöres	2008
Botond's Emergency Song (Botond vészdala)	Attila Havasi	2010
[anya milyen]	Orsolya Karafiáth	2012
To the Unknown Sweatheart (Az ismeretlen kedveshez)	Sándor Weöres	2013
Ave Maria	Liturgical Text	2024

==== Pop music ====
Title	Artist(s)	Publication
I Gotta Fly^{(Valami más)}	Lilla Polyák	2013
It Can't Be Over	Fool Moon	2014
Bolondod voltam	Gergő Rácz, Ív	2016
Emlékkép	Tibor Kocsis	2016
Crack my code	Reni Tolvai	2017
Everest	Reni Tolvai	2017
Mostantól^{(From Now On)}	Gergő Rácz, Reni Orsovai	2019
Maradj	Lilla Polyák	2021
Tubisoda	Gergő Rácz	2025

=== Theatre music ===
Title	Theatre	Premiere
Widows^{(Özvegyek)}	Academy of Drama and Film, Budapest	2007
Berzsian and Dideki^{(Berzsián és Dideki)}	National Theatre, Budapest	2009
Intrigue and Love^{(Ármány és Szerelem)}	Müpa Budapest, Budapest	2009
Hungarian Celebration^{(Magyar Ünnep)}	National Theatre, Budapest	2010
Mephisto	National Theatre, Budapest	2013
Danton's Death^{(Danton halála)}	Comedy Theatre, Budapest	2013
The Evil Spirit Lumpazivagabundus^{(Lumpáciusz Vagabundusz)}	Comedy Theatre, Budapest	2014
The Imaginary Invalid^{(A képzelt beteg)}	Budapest Puppet Theatre, Budapest	2016
Frau Holle^{(Holle anyó)}	Budapest Puppet Theatre, Budapest	2017

=== Film scores ===
Title	Nationality, Genre Director; Producer(s)	Date
Indián	Hungarian tragicomedy film István P. Szabó; Placebo Stars, Sparks	2013
Just Drop Dead^{(Halj már meg!)}	Hungarian feature film Zoltán Kamondi; FocusFox Studio, Honeymood Films	2016

== Discography ==
Compilation albums
Work(s)	Album	Publisher	Year	Other
Máté Bella: Moods / Stimmungen		TON 4 Records	2005
Message Message 02	Young Hungarian Composers for Cimbalom	Hungaroton	2009	Beáta Móri
Chuang Tzu's Dream	New Hungarian Music Forum 2009 composers' competition	BMC HMIC	2010	CD 1
Contemporary Classics I: Moods		Erwin Pitsch Publishing / TON 4 Records	2012
Valami más (single)		Sony Music	2013	Lilla Polyák
It Can't Be Over (kislemez)		Schubert Music Publishing	2014	Fool Moon
Emlékkép	3	GoldRecord Hungary	2016	Tibor Kocsis
Bolondod Voltam (Sante Cruze Remix) (Feat. Ív) (single)		Schubert Music Publishing	2016	Gergő Rácz, Ív
Crack my code (single)		Magneoton	2018	Reni Tolvai
Everest (single)		Magneoton	2018	Reni Tolvai
Resonance		Máté Bella	2026	Cantemus Mixed Choir

== Awards and competition prizes ==
=== Awards ===
- Junior Prima Award (2010)
- Istvánffy Benedek Prize (Chuang Tzu's Dream, 2010)
- Best theatre music – Theater Critics Award (Magyar ünnep, 2011)
- Istvánffy Benedek Prize (A tavasz ébredése, 2013)
- Junior Classical Composer of the Year Artisjus Prize (2015)
- Ferenc Erkel Prize (2016)
- Béla Bartók–Ditta Pásztory Prize (2019)
- Petőfi Music Award for Song of the Year (Mostantól, 2020)
- Hungarian Music Awards Fonogram prize for Best Hungarian Modern Pop-rock Album or Recording of the Year category (Mostantól, 2020)
- Artisjus Award – Classical Music Work of the Year (The Cheerleaders, 2025)

=== Competition prizes ===
- 1st prize – Weiner Leó Composition Competition, Budapest (2002)
- 1st prize – 6th International Composition Competition (Farbotony), Kaniv, Ukraine (2003)
- 3rd prize – National Improvisation Competition, Budapest (2003)
- Special Prize – National Composition Competition, Budapest (2004)
- Special Prize – Vántus István Composer Competition, Association of Hungarian Composes and Vántus István Foundation, Szeged (2006)
- 3rd prize – National Composition Competition, Budapest (2006)
- Shared 1st prize – Liszt Academy Composer Competition, Budapest (2007)
- Special Prize – Youth Contemporary Music Evenings, Budapest (2007)
- Special Prize – 9th Zdarzenia Theatre and Art Festival, Tczew (2007)
- Special Prize – Youth Contemporary Music Evenings, Budapest (2008)
- Special Prize – Wekerle centenarian, Wekerle Cultural Association, Budapest (2008)
- Special Prize – Youth Contemporary Music Evenings, Budapest (2009)
- 1st prize – Liszt Academy Composer Competition, Budapest (2009)
- 1st prize in Chamber Music – NHMF Composer Competition, Budapest (Chuang Tzu's Dream, 2009)
- 3rd prize, Musical Competition of Madách Theatre, Budapest (Macskadémon/The Demon Cat, 2010)
- Shared 3rd prize – Liszt Academy Composer Competition, Budapest (2010)
- 1st prize – Generace Composer Competition, Ostrava (2013)
- 1st prize in Chamber Music – NHMF Composer Competition, Budapest (Trance, 2013)
- 1st prize – Generace Composer Competition, Ostrava (2015)
