= EJM =

EJM may refer to:

- European Journal of Minority Studies (EJM), a quarterly peer-reviewed academic journal
- EconJobMarket.org, a nonprofit organization that facilitates the flow of information in the economics job market
