= László Ágoston =

Hungarian baritone singer and director

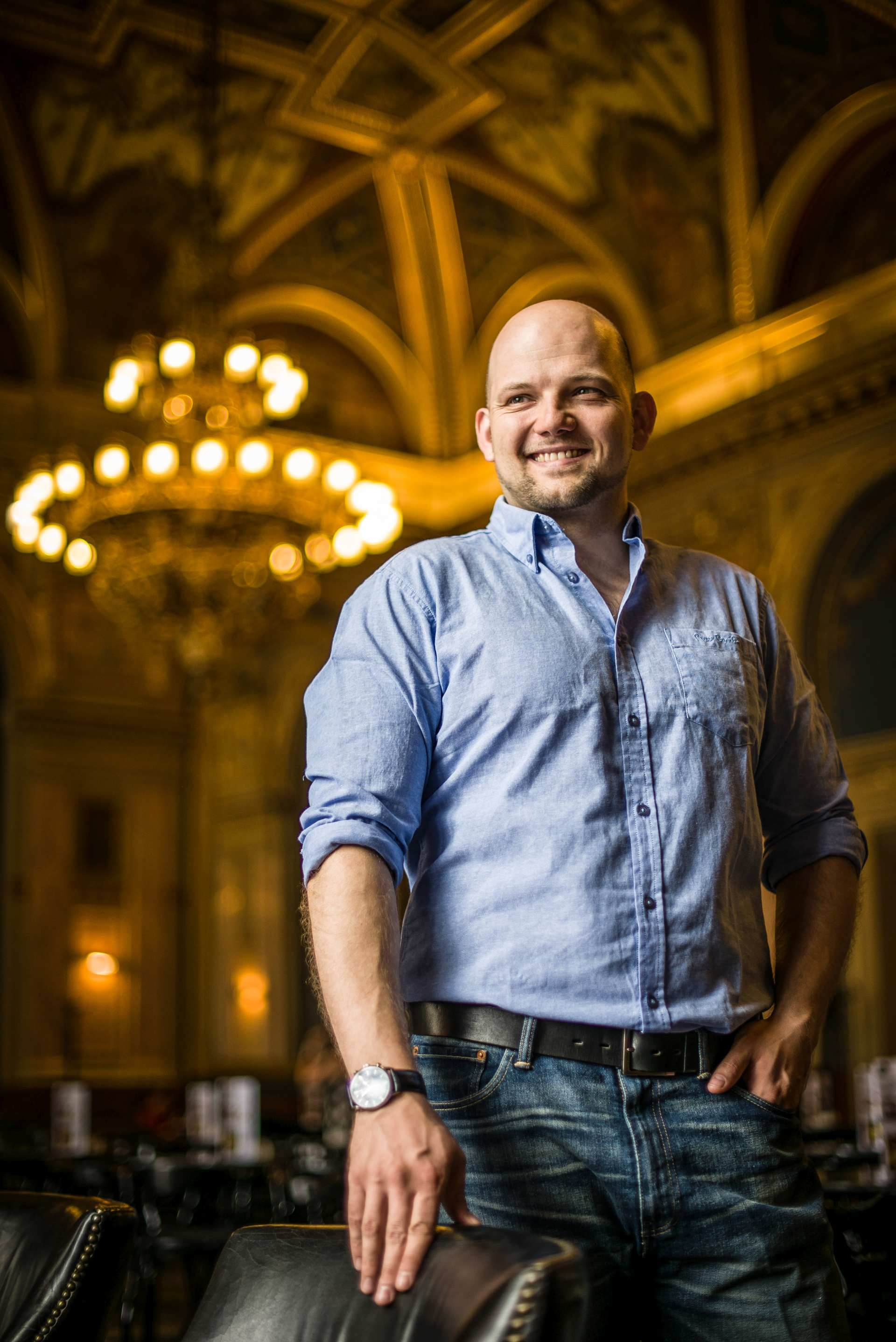

Background information
- Born: Ágoston László András; 25 July 1986 (age 40)
- Origin: Budapest, Hungary
- Genre: Opera
- Occupations: Singer, director, manager
- Years active: 2003–present
- Website: agostonlaszlo.hu

László András Ágoston (born 25 July 1986) is a Hungarian baritone opera singer, cultural manager, the founder of Moltopera, music educator, marketing expert and one of the best-known bloggers in his native country.

== Early life ==
László András Ágoston was born in Budapest in 1986. His mother was a primary school teacher, his father was a writer László T. Ágoston. He has been interested in the world of theater from his childhood, earning success first in poetry recitals. In his teens he was awarded the Attila József-prize, Vörösmarty-medallion, Kalidoszkóp-prize and finally the highest Hungarian amateur performers' award, the Radnóti-diploma. Although as an actor his career had a promising start, he had already participated in TV-shows and theatre performances, eventually he chose the genre of opera at the age of 21.

== Years at the University ==
Besides attending the marketing-PR and journalism faculty of Budapest College of Communication and Business László has also received classical vocal training with Lujza H. Németh and music theory with Rita Széll. After four years of concentrated learning and some successes in smaller singing competitions he got admission to the Franz Liszt Academy of Music for the first try. He became the student of the famous baritone Sándor Sólyom-Nagy in the faculty led by nobody else but Eva Marton, the celebrated soprano of many international opera houses including Metropolitan Opera, New York City.

He received recognition in both institutions, including the state-funded Fellowship of the Republic. His academic work on the relationship between advertising and music earned first prize at the Conference of Scientific Students’ Associations (TDK) and a special award at the National Conference of Scientific Students’ Associations, contributing to his academic focus in this field.

At the Franz Liszt Academy of Music, he was elected to president of the Student Union in his junior year making long-lasting effect on the student life during his presidency, ex. founding the university's newspaper "Figaro" that is still in publish today.

== Management ==
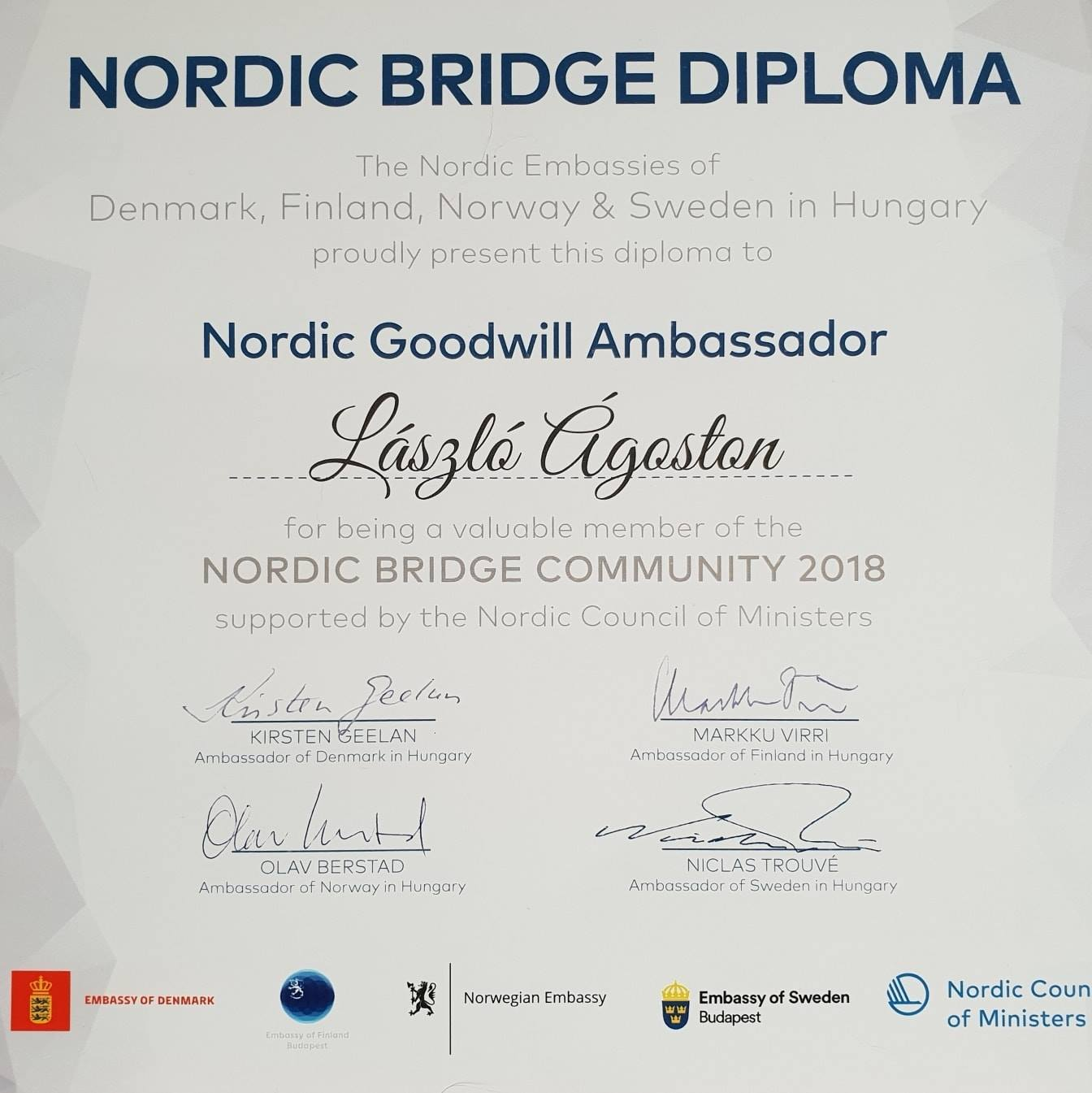
Laszlo's Nordic Goodwill Ambassador diploma

After his graduation from the Franz Liszt Academy of Music he gathered the "best young musicians he knew" and founded Moltopera. Some of these musicians became his first management clients, as well.

His client, Marianna Sipos, earned the right to sing in the ARD International Music Competition, Kayamar won 1st prize in T-mobile's composers' competition , and received a "Curators choice" award at the Noise Festival in London by Brian Eno. "What a voice! What a harmonist! What a humorist! Very funny and quite beautiful too. A lovely layering of voices and eclectic in it's [sic] references. Outstanding." - commented the world-famous musician on Kayamar's winning piece.

Between 2011 and 2013, he was secretary general of the Jeunesses Musicales Hungary, the Hungarian branch of the largest youth music NGO in the world.

== Marketing ==
László Ágoston's marketing career had a kickstart as being online marketing advisor of the most prestigious Hungarian cultural institution, the Hungarian State Opera from 2012 to 2015. Beside creating marketing campaigns his main task was to help to rebuild and design a new IT-system of the whole organization. During these years the Opera House received various national and international awards in the field of marketing including the Silver Dolphin and the Black Dolphin (for the "best music") in the 5th Cannes Corporate Media & TV Awards 2014.

Later he designed online campaigns mainly for projects with public interest including the Háttér Society, the main LGBTQI association of Hungary and study skills training for children.

== Moltopera ==
After graduating in 2011 from the Franz Liszt Academy of Music he instantly founded Moltopera, a company of young opera singers aiming to make the genre of opera "understandable and likable" again, even for young audiences.

Moltopera became known and popular very fast, already they 3rd performance ever was given in the main hall of Palace of Arts in front of 400 renowned opera managers of the world in the showcase of International Artist Managers' Association congress. After this occasion Moltopera received invitation to one of the largest European youth festivals, the Sziget Festival, to the National Theatre of Pécs. and, on 3 November 2012, they gave their first all night performance (Mozart's Magic flute) at the Festival Theater.

Moltopera debuted at the Hungarian State Opera with L'isola disabitata on 23 November 2014, directed by Zsófi Geréb. Because of the sudden illness of the baritone protagonist, László Ágoston had to save the performance learning the role and the direction in less than 36 hours. He debuted as a singer in the Hungarian State Opera in this emergency situation earning the critics' praise.

After the successful and critically acclaimed debut of Moltopera (even featured among the best directions of the 2014/2015 season in Hungary), they became regular guest performers in the Hungarian State Opera with a new premiere every year. (The Hopping from the Seraglio in 2015/2016 - a children's version of The Abduction from the Seraglio), Two women (contemporary opera of Samu Gryllus in 2016/2017).

=== Moltopera Germany ===
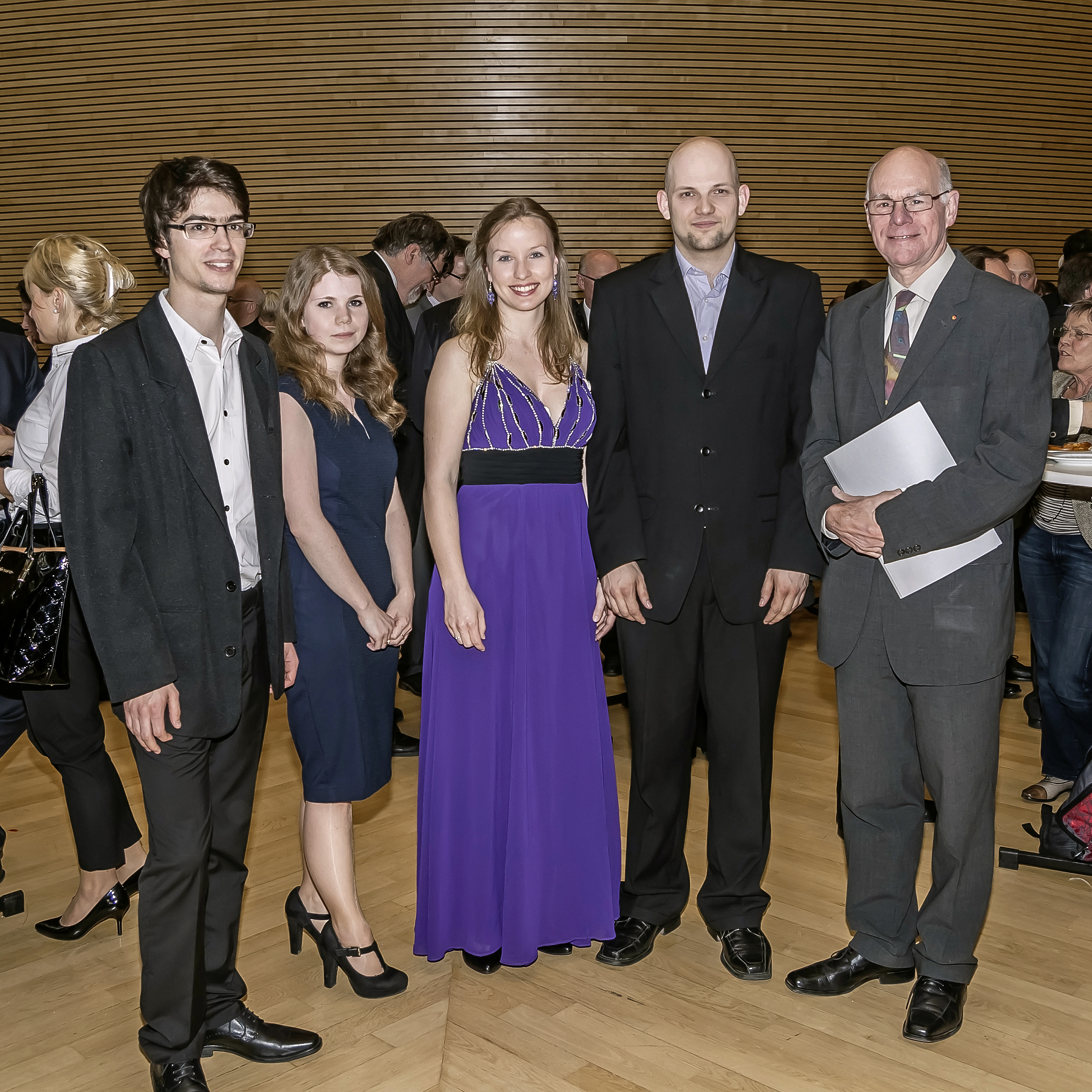
Moltopera-members with president of the Bundestag, Prof. Dr. Norbert Lammert in the Landtag of the Free State of Saxony

In 2013, Moltopera Germany was founded by young German cultural managers in Görlitz in cooperation with the Hungarian members. Their first concert took place at the Landtag of the Free State of Saxony in 2013. Later Moltopera Germany mainly performed Ágoston's classical music educational performances in German schools in the Görlitz area.

== Classical music education ==
László has been giving lectures about classical music under the title of "One can love it!" from the very beginning of his career. His participation-based, interactive performances unique approach contains elements from a teacher's aspect to even the world of stand-up comedy. He performs in various venues from schools and universities through festivals to theaters.

== Blog ==
László Ágoston started his blog in March 2016 and reached the 100 000 followers' threshold extremely quick, almost in one year. In the summer of 2018, their number has grown over 130 000. He mainly posts about human rights, promoting gay rights, women's rights, about immigration and personal issues.

=== Controversy ===
Ágoston is known as a loud critic of Viktor Orbán. He often conducts social experiments to make people question their political beliefs. The most well known among these was a post stating that Hungary is a welcoming country for Muslim people, Hungarians should learn more about Sharia law and respect the Muslim culture. He even advertised this post among the followers of Viktor Orbán, and his governing party, the Fidesz, receiving fierce and vulgar criticism. Soon he revealed that the words he used were exact quotes of Viktor Orbán's speech in front of Muslim bankers. The experiment soon went viral and on the same day unknown hackers attacked his server, blocking the content from the visitors for weeks. His opposition to Orban's politics and enthusiastic defence of the human rights made him an often attacked persona in the Hungarian public talk even though he is known for his very calm and modest style.

== Sexual education and polyamory ==
László Ágoston is openly polyamorous. He founded Nonmono, an educational website that organizes educational events on the topics of ethical non-monogamy, like open relationships, open marriages, the swinger lifestyle and polyamory.

== Awards ==
- Nordic Goodwill Ambassador
- Fellowship granted by the Republic
- Kaleidoszkop-prize
- Radnóti-diploma
- Vörösmarty-medallion
- Conference of Scientific Students' Associations (TDK) – 1st prize
- National Conference of Scientific Students' Associations – special prize
