= Janka Kulcsár =

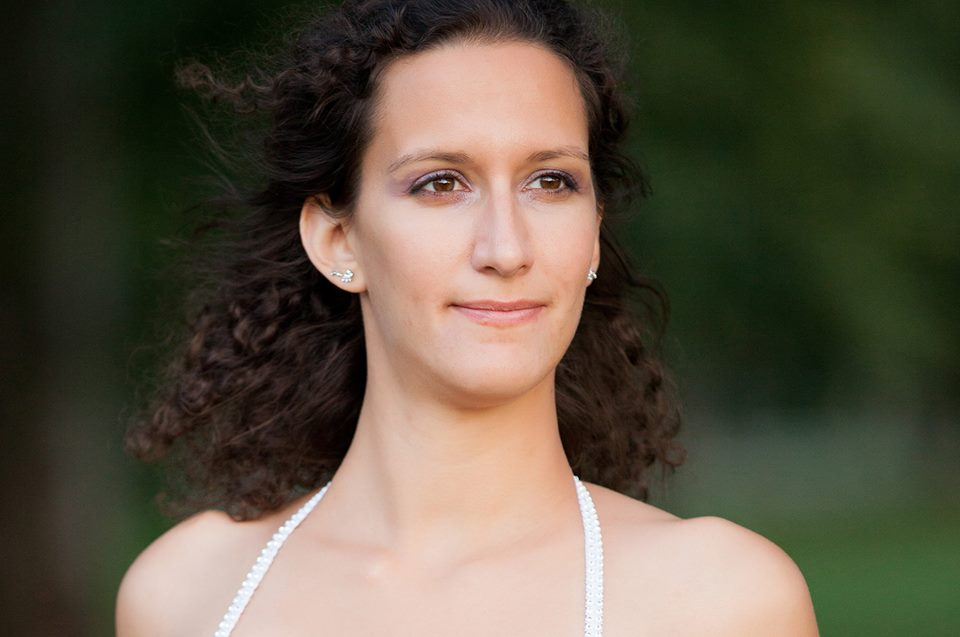

Background information
- Born: 8 April 1985 (age 41)
- Origin: Budapest, Hungary
- Genres: Opera, classical
- Occupation: Répétiteur at Moltopera Company
- Instrument: Piano
- Years active: 2003–present
- Website: www.moltopera.com

Janka Kulcsár (born 8 April 1985) is a Hungarian pianist and répétiteur, and a founding member of the Moltopera Company.

== Life ==
=== Early life ===
Janka Kulcsár was born on 8 April 1985 in Budapest. Kulcsár entered the Béla Bartók Conservatory at the age of fourteen. She participated frequently in summer courses during this period, like the International Music Camp in Balassagyarmat. At the age of eighteen she had already been a student of the Franz Liszt Academy of Music, coached by Lehel Both, at the age of twenty she won the 1st prize of the National Piano Competition for University Students. In the next year, she won a prize in the National Chamber Music Competition. Kulcsár works mainly with singers. She accompanied Marianna Sipos in the ARD International Music Competition in 2012.

=== Moltopera ===
Founding member of the Moltopera Company since 2011. She accompanied among others Moltopera's production Don Giovanni, Magic Flute (in the Palace of Arts), Fledermaus, La Bohéme, Cavalleria Rusticana, Menotti's: The telephone, L'enfant et les sortiléges (in the National Theater of Pécs), and How to survive an opera recital? (in the Sziget Festival).

== Awards ==
- National Piano Competition for University Students - I. prize
- Prize at the National Chamber Music Competition

== Sources ==
- Kulcsár Janka a Moltopera hivatalos honlapján
- Kulcsár Janka profilja a MusiciansWho-n
