= Moltopera =

Hungarian independent opera company

Moltopera Company
- Origin: Hungary
- Genre: Opera
- Years active: 2011–present
- Members: László Ágoston; Janka Kulcsár; Renáta Burghardt; Csaba Tőri; Renáta Göncz
- Past members: Zoltán Gradsach; Dávid Dani; Katalin Vámosi; András Decsi; András Kiss; Marianna Sipos
- Website: moltopera.com

Moltopera Company is a Hungarian independent opera company. Moltopera targets mainly the young and those who dislike opera, inviting new audiences for the genre. In order to achieve this, Moltopera tries to dismiss the general opera stereotypes of the "fat, incomprehensible singers and unrealistic stories on stage." Apart from the stage performances, Moltopera also gives lectures in universities and secondary schools.

== History ==
=== Foundation ===
Moltopera was founded by László Ágoston in August 2011. Their debut concert was on 15 February 2011. At this time, Moltopera had a constant company, gathering the most talented singers of the Franz Liszt Academy of Music. In this introductory venue, the following artists stepped on stage: Renáta Göncz, Zoltán Gradsach, Dávid Dani, Katalin Vámosi, András Decsi, László Ágoston, András Kiss, Marianna Sipos and the pianist Janka Kulcsár, all of which are considered the founding members. Moltopera's first concert was so successful that Moltopera was asked to perform again. One month later, Moltopera was invited to perform in front of 400 international managers in the annual conference of the International Artist Managers' Association (IAMA) in one of the most renowned Hungarian concert halls, the Palace of Arts.

=== Productions ===
Although the independent opera company received no monetary support, Moltopera's audience grew. After performing the sextet from Mozart's Don Giovanni in the IAMA congress, they received numerous invitations to perform in Hungary.

In May, Moltopera's conductor, Csaba Tőri, gave a lecture for the inquiry of Da Vinci Learning TV channel in the Millenaris Park. This event was followed by 25 other occasions held by him and other Moltopera members (Lili Békéssy, László Ágoston). Moltopera was invited to perform on two nights at the Sziget Festival, one of the largest musical and cultural festivals in Europe. Moltopera put on stage Mozart's Magic Flute and a narrated, educational aria recital following they "opera in every venues" principle in a pop-rock festival. The main attraction of Moltopera in the autumn season of 2012 was the Magic Flute, leading to a highly promoted, full house production in the Palace of Arts.

=== Magic Flute! I love it! ===
Most of Moltopera's stage directions are simple but traditional -Magic Flute! I love it! is their most controversial (contemporary set) performance. In an interview with the new stage director Olga Sára Kelenhegyi and dramaturg Eszter Diána Mátrai, they had boosted the expectations of the show when they announced the performance with László Ágoston: "this performance will hurt a lot of people". After numerous successful traditional performances, Moltopera has chosen to put Magic Flute in a psychiatry, using own, self-written prosaic parts and a six-member ensemble instead of a symphonic orchestra transcribed by the young composer Kayamar. The critics disputed long about the direction, but the singers had three curtain calls and Moltopera became recognized nationwide, receiving publicity even from Serbia. Moltopera featured numerous guest artists in this production, even involving singers from the Hungarian State Opera, which predicted the transformation of the opera company.

=== Moltopera in the 2013 season ===
Since January 2013, Moltopera Company works without a constant staff of singers, but with a constant technical crew (conductor, répétiteur, stage director, management). On 31 January 2013, in Moltopera's La Bohéme in the National Theater of Pécs, only Marianna Sipos, Janka Kulcsár, Zoltán Gradsach and László Ágoston were featured from the founding members beside acclaimed singers like Ildikó Szakács or András Hajdú. Even with the change of the structure, Moltopera's priority remains the same: teach the everyday people how to like opera without taking solfege classes and google the plot of the upcoming opera.

=== Going international ===
In January 2014 Moltopera Germany has been launched with the presidency of Nils Matthiesen. The first sign of life from the German organization came in May, when Moltopera debuted in Germany with a short concert in the Parliament of Dresden in the presence of such excellencies as Matthias Theodor Vogt or "the second man of Germany" Norbert Lammert. Soon after this Moltopera Germany accomplished an educational project in the Görlitz area, with the participation of both Hungarian and German members supported by the European Union.

=== Debut in the Hungarian State Opera ===
From 23 November 2014 Moltopera is engaged to perform a series of Haydn's "L' isola disabitata" in the Hungarian State Opera in cooperation with the Academy of Drama and Film in Budapest accompanied by the musicians of the Budapest Philharmonic Orchestra.

=== Twelve performances in the Hungarian State Opera in 2015/2016 ===
After last year's very successful debut with Haydn's The desert island (L’isola disabitata), Moltopera will perform in Hungarian State Opera in the next season, too. The new premiere, The Hopping from the Seraglio, a children's opera is directed by János Novák. Moltopera debuted in the Hungarian State Opera on 23 November 2014 with the Zsófi Geréb-directed The desert island and was very successful not only according to critics, but also according to the Opera House's management. Hungarian State Opera has not only asked Moltopera to keep on performing The desert island during the next season, but also to present a new opera. The new piece is a children's version of the well-known opera of W. A. Mozart, The Abduction from the Seraglio. Although 'The Desert Island' aims also on teenagers, the new premiere is for children between 6 and 10 years. It is directed by the Jászai Mari Award-laureate János Novák, head of Kolibri Theatre, and conducted by the Lantos Rezső-prize awarded Csaba Tőri. The cast, as always, will be composed from young singers between the age of 20 and 35 who will have to face some extraordinary challenges.

== Education ==
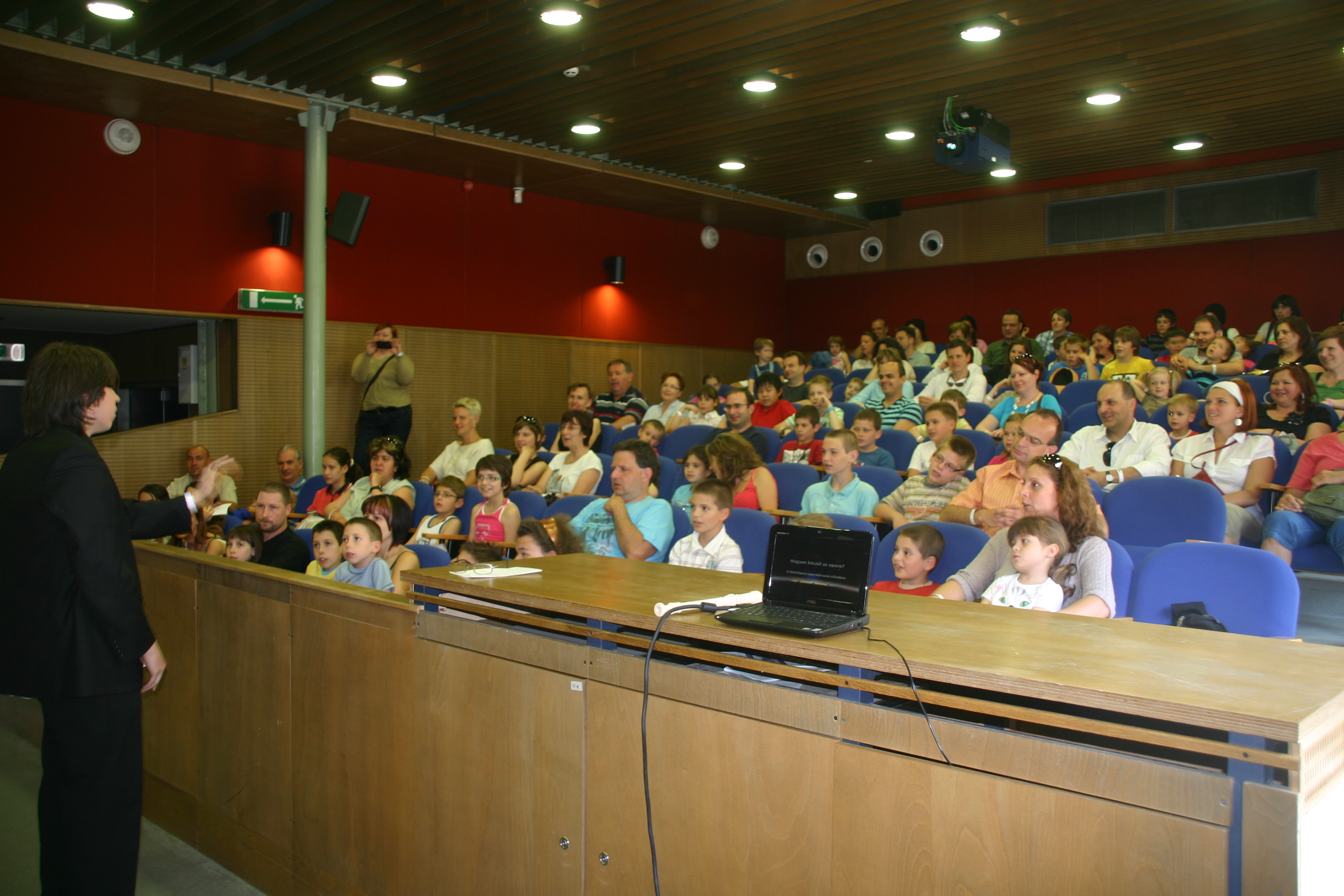
Csaba Töri, the conductor of Moltopera Company gives a lecture to a young audience.

Moltopera Company also puts great emphasis on giving lectures in schools, universities and other places. These lectures are given by conductor Csaba Tőri, László Ágoston general manager, singer and stage director or invited young musicologists "telling in the language of young why does a young choose the classical musicians' life". Beside the greatest Hungarian universities (Eötvös Loránd University, Budapest University of Technology and Economics, Semmelweis University, Corvinus University of Budapest etc.) Moltopera also participated in the nationally known Hungarian Day of Songs and worked for the Da Vinci Learning TV channel.

== Mission ==
=== Interest in opera ===
Moltopera has stated on their website that their goal is to "face the widely known stereotypes of the opera and to demonstrate that opera can be a real alternative against movie theaters and discos even in the 21st century!" Moltopera defines some of these stereotypes as:

- Opera singers are seen as typically "fat" and "ugly."
- Opera is unrealistic ("Opera is when a guy gets stabbed in the back and, instead of bleeding, he sings.")
- Opera singers "park and bark" on stage (A phenomenon in opera where the singer makes no attempt to play a part, that is to act, and instead simply stands and sings.)
- Opera is a form of entertainment suitable only for "snobs".
- Opera requires a substantial amount of preparation and work.
- Opera is incomprehensible and unnatural to those who are not familiar with the genre of entertainment.

Moltopera asserts that "In order to reach those people who are not likely to attend any opera performance, the company has to descend from the ivory tower of art and grab the initiative."

==== Performances ====
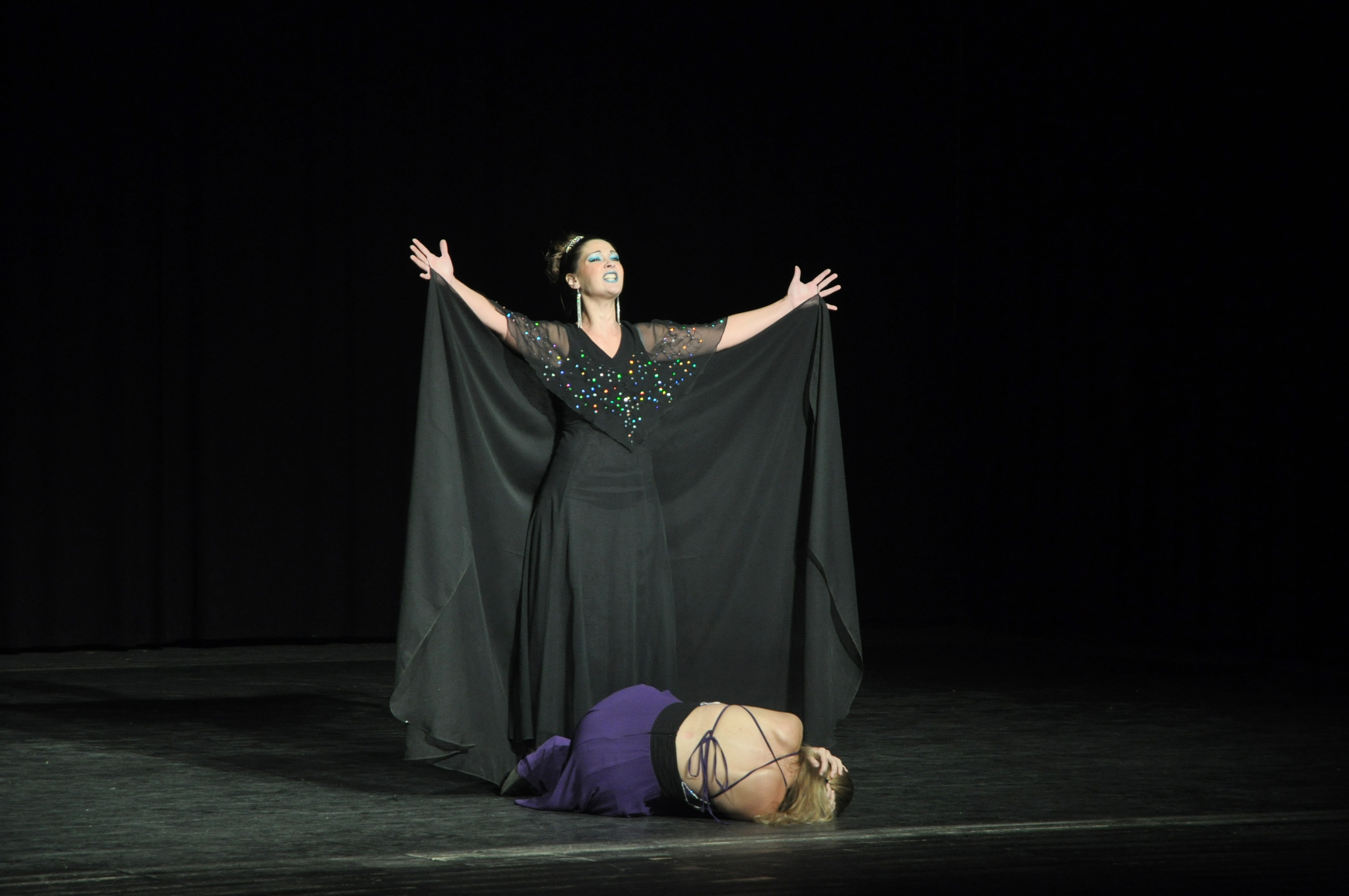
Taken in a countryside Magic Flute performance of the Moltopera Company. A performance optimized to mobility. (The Queen of the Night – Marianna Sipos; Pamina – Renáta Göncz)

Moltopera performs in a multitude of venues, such as rock festivals, pubs, and countryside theaters where opera has never been shown. They work with minimal sets and props (usually with piano accompaniment) creating "lightweight", easily portable productions.

==== Stage directing ====
Moltopera has stated its belief in giving vivid and rational directions. In an article by Tom Huizenga for Deceptive Cadence, it is pointed out that an opera has to compete with all the other 21st century possibilities of entertainment like 3D films or PlayStation, as their primary target group has easy and wide access to these other free time activities. Moltopera believes the best example of this way of thinking is their Don Giovanni Sextet rendition, which is usually sung standing in a half circle around Leporello, but László Ágoston directing a full, moving episode from it.

==== Youth involvement ====
Moltopera has played cut versions of operas for different university classes or colleges. They enhance understanding with narration in everyday language avoiding lexical information. The ratio of these two elements – and the length of the performance – varies according to the venue and the type of the audience. Moltopera believes that, just like in peer education, in opera, young people tend to listen closer when other young people are talking or singing. Moltopera asserts that it is even more important in an area where performers usually reach the better roles later in their career, in the age range of thirty to forty. Moltopera's average age of performance was 25 years in their beginnings. After the change of structure, this data became irrelevant, but Moltopera still holds this as a principle to employ as young singers as soon as possible, without the loss of overall quality of work.
