= András Máté Gömöri =

Hungarian actor, bodybuilder and powerlifter

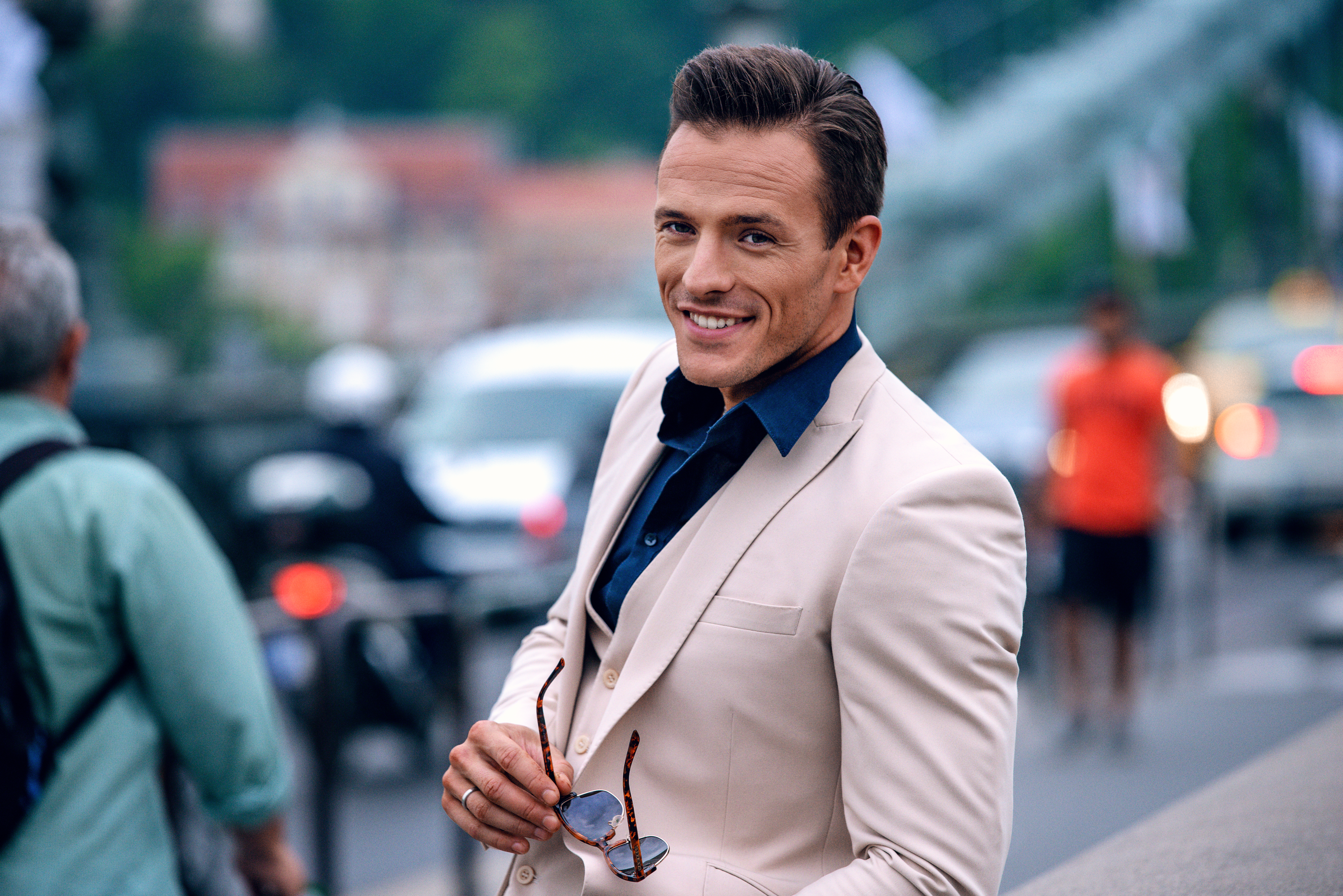
- András Máté Gömöri photographed by Adry and Greg Studio in 2019
- Born: 29 August 1992 (age 33); Szikszó, Hungary
- Occupations: Actor; bodybuilder; powerlifter
- Spouse: Lilla Polyák (m. 2018)

András Máté Gömöri (born August 29, 1992) is a Hungarian actor, bodybuilder and powerlifter.

== Personal life ==
András Máté Gömöri was 10 years old when he lost his mother, a mathematics teacher, and 16 when his father, an army officer and engineer, passed away. He has two brothers, Péter and Gergely, who are 16 and 12 years his elders respectively. He moved to Kisgyőr with his father, who at the time was living on disability benefits due to heart disease. This is where he spent his childhood, and where his father met Gömöri's future stepmother, Judit. He moved to a dormitory in Miskolc when he began his studies in Bláthy Ottó Electrical Engineering Vocational Secondary School (Bláthy Ottó Villamosipari Technikum). He spent a lot of time with his elder brother who lived in Miskolc, and later with his other brother, who lived in Pest.

He married Lilla Polyák in the summer of 2018.

== Acting career ==
He was a child when he got his first role in 2004 in the National Theatre of Miskolc.

He began his studies in the Pesti Magyar Academy of Drama at the Magyar Theatre — the successor of the Nemzeti Stúdió (Academy of the National Theatre) — in 2011, but his attraction gradually shifted from plays to musical theatre. In 2012 he applied for an acting student spot in the Pesti Broadway Studio at the Budapest Operetta Theater, but was offered the main role of Rudolph in the musical Elisabeth instead. From then on, he has acted in musicals such as Romeo and Juliet, Fame, Gone with the Wind, Flowers for Algernon, The Hunchback of Notre Dame, Singin' in the Rain, and Jekyll and Hyde.

In October 2018 he also debuted in prose in the drama The Night of the Tribades in the Pinceszínház located in Budapest.

Between 2017 and 2020 he completed the drama instructor and actor program of the University of Theatre and Film Arts in Budapest. His thesis explored the portrayal of negative characters.

Since 2014 he has appeared in various television series and the Hungarian movie Budapest Noir. For six months in 2018 he hosted the morning show on the television channel FEM3, and from January 2020 he has been hosting a lifestyle show on the channel TV2. He has also been involved with several events and galas.

In 2019 he was nominated for Playboy's (Marquard Media Hungary) Man of the Year award in the performance arts category.

== Sports career ==
At school, in addition to playing volleyball and football, he did athletics and participated in triathlons. Later, he turned to archery, and started competing in 2004. Around 2010 he was introduced to gym workouts, which started to play a significant role in his life after moving to Budapest. In 2012, he was already an avid bodybuilder, swimmer and runner. In 2014 he was presented with the Fittest Actor of the Year award at the third Fitbalance Award Gala, which he won again in 2019.

=== Bodybuilding career ===
In his first natural bodybuilding competition, which was held by the INBA (International Natural Bodybuilding Association) in Hungary in the summer of 2019, he won the novice as well as the overall category. His trainer was Csaba Kalas, who has won multiple natural bodybuilding championships. In the following year he took a break from competing to focus on his studies, but had already decided to enter the 2021 Natural Olympia in Las Vegas. In the meantime, he was offered a sponsorshipdeal by a nutritional and dietary supplement company.

On October 1, 2021, he won a silver medal in the INBA Elite Tour & Pro Show natural bodybuilding competition in Pécs. This allowed him to enter the world championship on 30 October in Bucharest, where he came in fifth. In November he became the champion and then the overall winner of the Natural Olympia Classic Physique Toll, and earned his pro card. He also won second place in the Open Bodybuilding category in Las Vegas.

=== Powerlifting career ===
In 2020 he took up another sport: powerlifting. His first competition was the RAW Powerlifting Hungarian Championship (RAW Erőemelő Magyar Bajnokság) held in 2021 in Budapest. Although his training still focused on bodybuilding, he came in 11th. In 2021 he became the founding competitor of the newly established powerlifting department of the Diósgyőri VTK sports club. In the Athletes Men's Open RAW Powerlifting Hungarian Championship (Athletes Férfi Open RAW Erőemelő Magyar Bajnokság) held in April 2022, he finished tenth in the 105 kg group. He was trained by Miklós Fekete, a captain of the National Powerlifting Association and a competitor in Sirius Lifting SE, and Tamás Neszveda powerlifting trainer.

== Awards and honors ==
Natural Olympia, Las Vegas, 2021

- Classic Physique Overall Champion – pro card winner
- Classic Physique Toll Champion
- Second place – Men's Bodybuilding - Open Tall

Superbody, Budapest, 2021

- Second place – Superbody Athletic category

INBA / PNBA World Championships, Bucharest, 2021

- Fifth place

INBA EliteTour & ProShow, Pécs, 2021

- Second place – Natural Bodybuilding – Open 175+

INBA Hungary Natural Bodybuilding INBA Grand Prix, Miskolc, 2019

- Bodybuilding Absolute Champion
- Bodybuilding Men's – Novice 180+ Champion
- Natural Bodybuilding – Open 180+ Champion

Fitbalance Award Gála 2014, 2019

- Fittest Actor of the Year award

Csillag-Award (Budapest Operetta Theater), 2013

- Discovery of the Year

== Theatrical roles ==
Authors	Title	Role	Theatre	Year
Imre Madách - Dezső Keresztury - György Selmeczi	Mózes (Moses)	Child Joshua	National Theatre of Miskolc	2004
Sylvester Lévay - Michael Kunze	Elisabeth	Rudolf	Budapest Operetta Theater	2012
Károly Peller	Oszi Boszi, a repülő nagyanyó	Délceg királyfi	Budapest Operetta Theater	2012
Áron Tamási - László Tolcsvay	Ördögölő Józsiás	Boricz	Budapest Operetta Theater	2012
Gérard Presgurvic	Gone with the Wind	Brant Tarleton / Peter Fontaine	Budapest Operetta Theater	2012
Gérard Presgurvic	Roméo et Juliette	Benvolio	Budapest Operetta Theater	2014
Ferenc Farkas – András Dékány – Attila Lőrinczy	Csínom Palkó	Peti / Csínom Palkó	Budapest Operetta Theater	2014
Steve Margoshes - Jose Fernandez - Jacques Levy	Fame	Jack	Budapest Operetta Theater	2014
Ferenc Jávori (Fegya)	Menyasszonytánc	Gáspár	Budapest Operetta Theater	2014
David Rogers - Charles Strouse	Flowers for Algernon	Nemur	Budapest Operetta Theater	2015
Lévay Szilveszter - Michael Kunze	Marie Antoinette	Axel Von Fersen	Budapest Operetta Theater	2015
Betty Comden - Adolph Green - Arthur Freed - Nacio Herb Brown	Singin' in the Rain	Don Lockwood	Budapest Operetta Theater	2015
Tibor Kocsák - Tibor Miklós	Lady Budapest	Mr. Rhinalder	Budapest Operetta Theater	2016
Alan Menken - Stephen Schwartz - Peter Parnell	The Hunchback of Notre Dame	Fredric Charlus	Budapest Operetta Theater	2016
Levente Szörényi - János Bródy	István a király	Vecellin	Budapest Operetta Theater	2018
Szabolcs Fényes - Imre Harmath	Maya	Charlie Kettman	Budapest Operetta Theater	2018
Per Olov Enquist	The Night of the Tribades	Viggo Schiwe	Pinceszínház	2018
Richard Rodgers - Oscar Hammerstein II.	Carousel - Liliom	Billy Bigelow	Budapest Operetta Theater	2019
Pál Békés - Mátyás Várkonyi	A félőlény	Csatang	Karinthy Theatre	2019
Mitch Leigh - Joe Darion - Dale Wasserman	Don Quijote de la Mancha	Prince / Carrasco / Knight of Mirrors	Budapest Operetta Theater	2020
Robert Louis Stevenson, Frank Wildhorn, Leslie Bricusse	Jekyll and Hyde	Simon Stride	Budapest Operetta Theater	2022
Neil LaBute	Fat Pig	Tom	Karinthy Theatre	2022

== Filmography ==
=== Film ===
Title	Role	Genre	Type	Year
Budapest Noir	couplet singer	Crime, Drama, History	Feature film	2017
Get Lost	Maxim, Red Knight	Drama	Feature film	2022
Gentle (Szelíd)	Man in a Suit	Drama	Feature film	2022

=== Television ===
Title	Role	Genre/type	Channel	Year
Barátok közt	Benji	TV series	RTL Klub	2014
FEM3 Café	Presenter	Magazine show	FEM3	2018
200 Első Randi	Bálint Szondi	Film series	Viasat 3	2018
A mi kis falunk	Norbi	TV series	RTL Klub	2019
Drága örökösök	Kalmi	TV series	RTL Klub	2019
Edzőtárs	TV presenter	Lifestyle show	TV2	2020
Keresztanyu	Zozó Bárány	TV series	RTL Klub	2021–2022
