= Csaba Tőri =

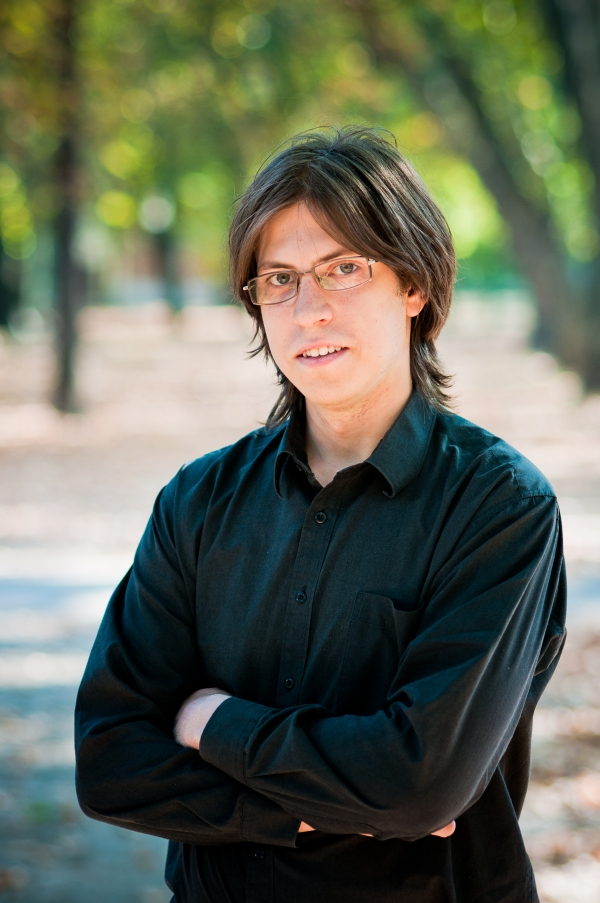

Background information
- Born: November 12, 1987 (age 38)
- Genres: opera, classical music, choir
- Instrument: conductor
- Years active: 2008–present

Csaba Tőri (born 12 November 1987) is a musical conductor, music teacher and founding member of the Moltopera Company. He is a winner of the Rezső Lantos-prize.

== Career ==
=== Conducting ===
Csaba Tőri earned a degree in 2011 at the Franz Liszt Academy of Music where he was a student of Péter Erdei. After graduation he participated the foundation of the Moltopera Company. He leads two choirs, conducts the Vox Insana Chamber Choir and the Medicantare Women's Choir and directs the Budapest Academic Choral Society. At his graduation he conducted Brahms's Ein Deutsches Requiem.

=== Moltopera ===
He founded the Moltopera Company in 2011. Moltopera mostly performs with piano accompaniment. On 3 November 2012 he conducted the ensemble in the Palace of Arts in Moltopera's Magic Flute performance.

=== Teacher ===
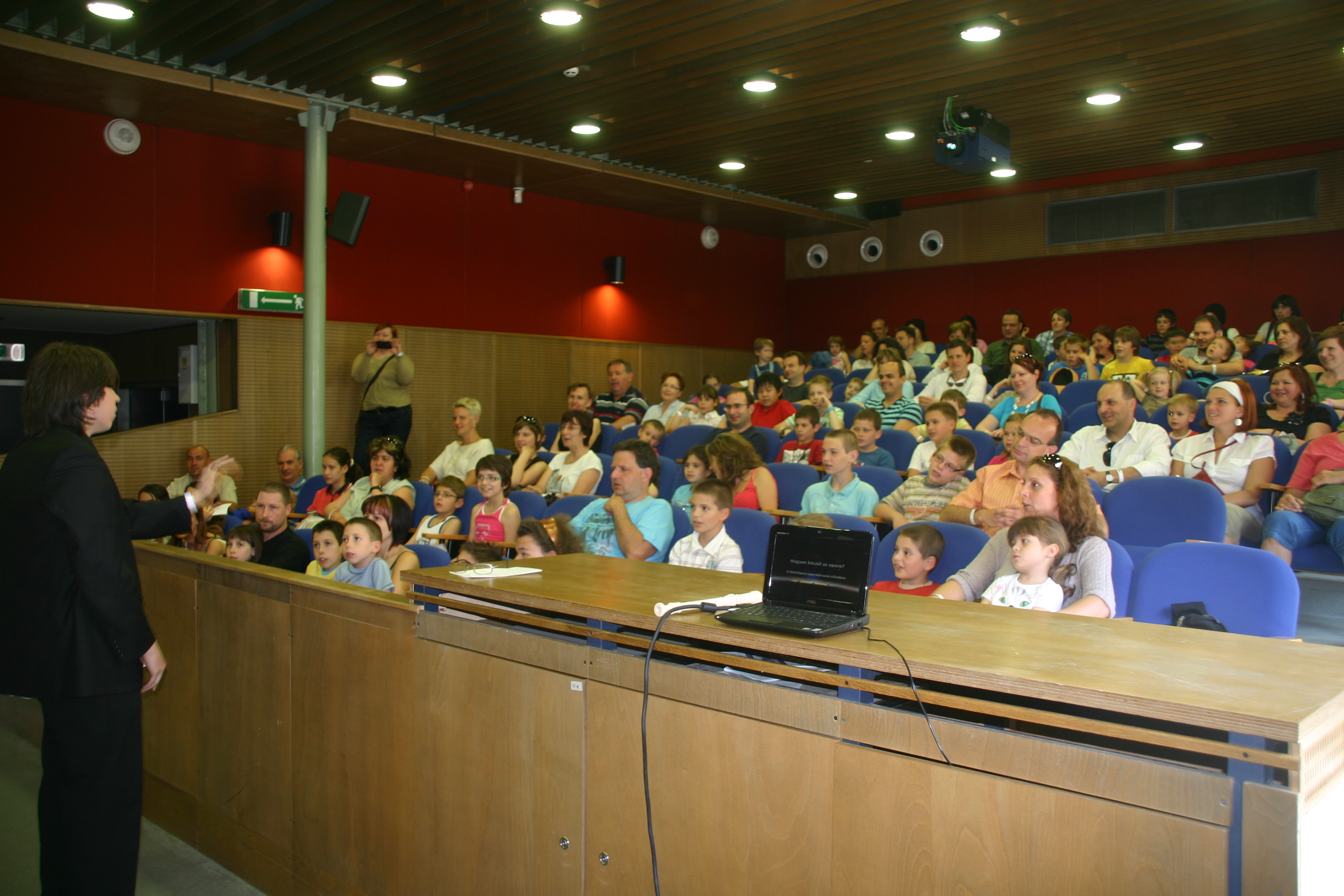
Csaba Tőri delivering a lecture to children

At 24 years old, he started teaching in one of the most prestigious high schools of Hungary the Budapesti Fazekas Mihály Gimnázium. The next year he started as a teacher in the Béla Bartók Music High School. He lectures frequently as part of Moltopera Matinée.

== Awards ==
- National Competition of Young Conductors - 1st prize (Rezső Lantos-prize) and two special prizes

== Sources ==
- Csaba Tőri's profile on the homepage of the Moltopera
- Csaba Tőri on Musicianswho
