= Palace of Music =

Coordinates: 48.103534°N 20.776309°E

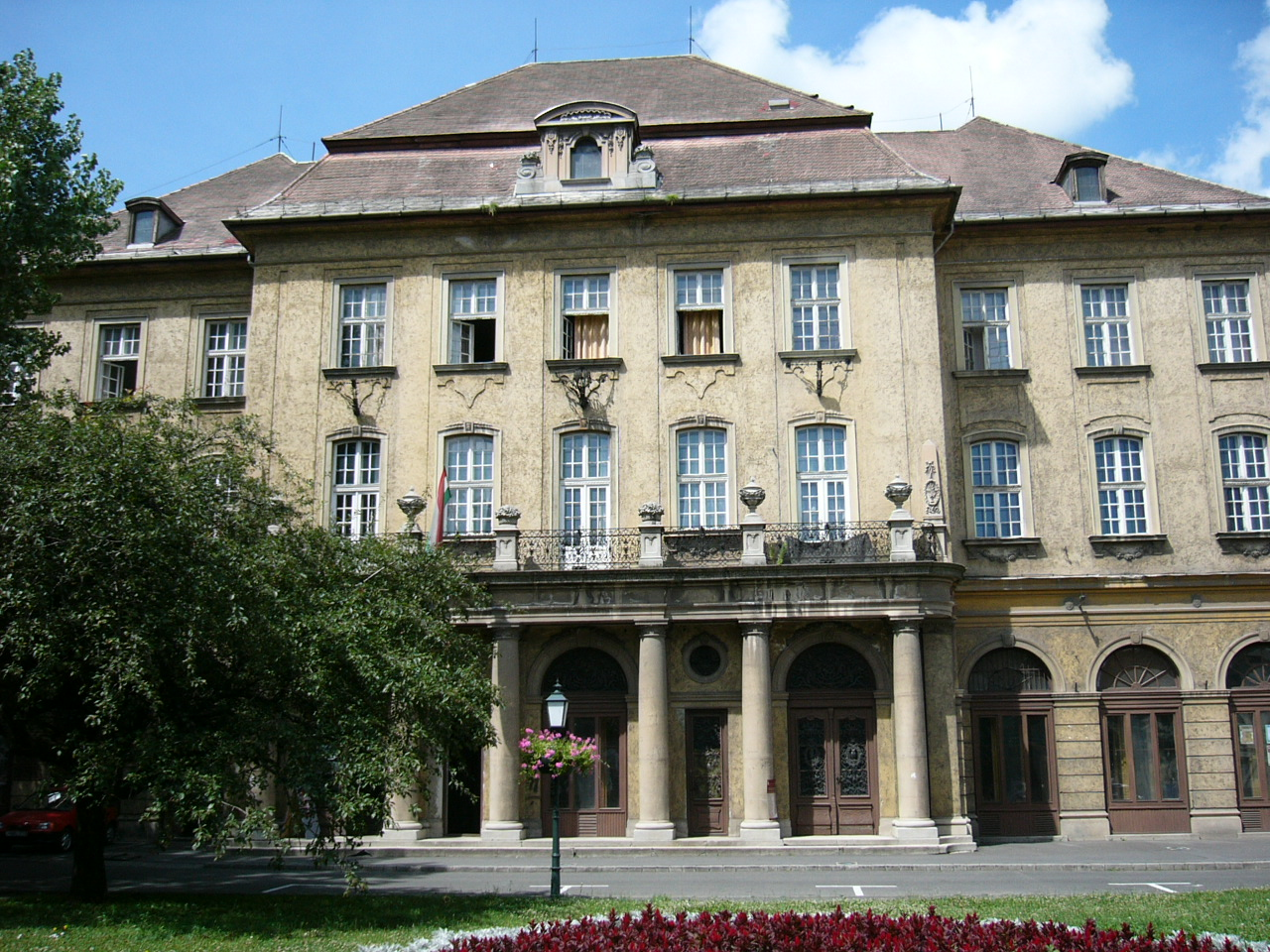
The Palace of Music

The Palace of Music (Zenepalota) is a building in Bartók square, Miskolc, Hungary. It is in the Béla Bartók Secondary School and the Béla Bartók Music Institute (a faculty of the University of Miskolc.) Designed by Gyula Waelder in Neo-baroque style, it was constructed between 1926 and 1927. USA loans -- just like that of the Hotel Palace in Lillafüred and the Market Hall on Búza tér -- financed the project. The Palace plays an important role in the cultural life of the city. It has a large concert hall where concerts are regularly held.

The music institute -- originally named after the violinist Jenő Hubay -- moved into the building in 1927, on the 25th anniversary of its founding.

== See also ==
- List of concert halls

== Sources ==
- István Dobrossy: Miskolc írásban és képekben 4. (Miskolc, 1997)
- Miskolc (Budapest, 1979)
- Miskolc (Panoráma magyar városok sorozat, 1982; ISBN 963-243-124-3)
