= Kayamar =

Hungarian singer and composer (born 1985)

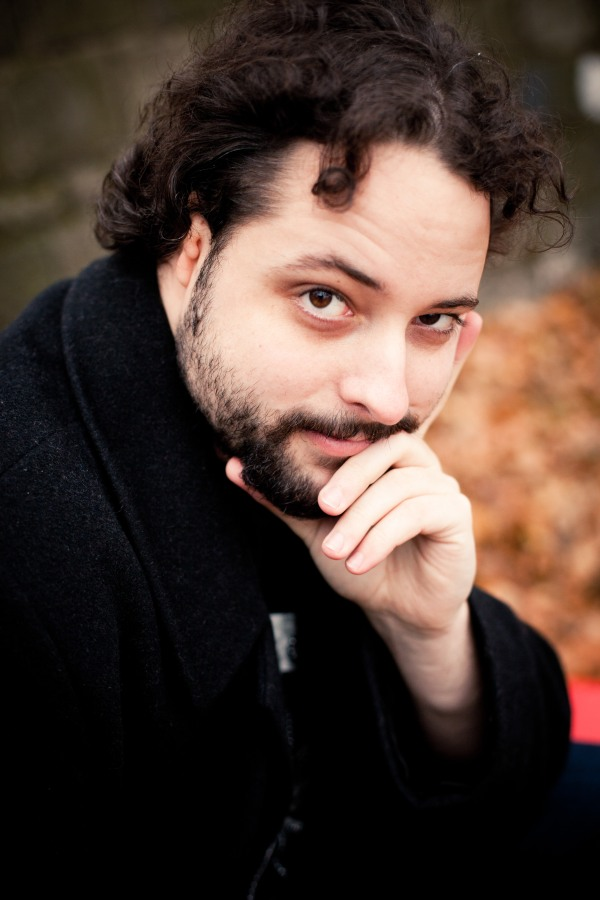

Background information
- Also known as: Kayamar
- Born: Viktor Magyaróvári; 12 May 1986 (age 39)
- Origin: Gyula, Hungary
- Genres: jazz, a cappella, vocal, classical, looper pedalist
- Years active: 2005 – present

Viktor Magyaróvári (born 12 May 1985, Mezőhegyes), known by his stage name Kayamar, is a Hungarian singer, jazz and classical composer. He has abilities in the areas of hearing (Hertz-pitch that is even more precise than absolute pitch), vocal range (it is proven that he has more than 5 octaves from Ab0-C6 being one of the lowest basses in the world) and improvisation.

Kayamar gained recognition from the media in 2011 when he won the 1st prize in the T-mobile's composers' competition.

His stage name is derived from the anagram of his birth name (Kayamar Vorti Virgo in the full form) that is also his name in his Tolkien-like self-invented language, the kamirami. This language has grammar and concrete vocabulary, Kayamar is able to compose and speak in it. He composes and sing in the genre of jazz, classical and pop either.

== Early life ==
Viktor Magyaróvári was born in Gyula, Hungary, but spent his childhood in a small country town, called Mezőhegyes. His talent has revealed soon and after a few years of special private lessons of solfege and harmonization the pianist, Gábor Eckhardt invited him to the Béla Bartók Conservatory of Music.

His parents followed him and he moved to Budapest with his family soon, at the age of 13. His first professor was Gábor Ugrin who taught him conducting. After the voice break it revealed soon that his vocal chords are able to resonate in an extremely wide spectrum while his voice does not lose its flexibility. Although he studied classical (opera) singing for a long time, it took him more than 10 years of autodidact practising to have the total control over his capabilities. After the Conservatory he won admission to the Franz Liszt Academy of Music where he studied conducting. He never participated in official composition classes.

== Career ==
=== Getting on the spotlight ===
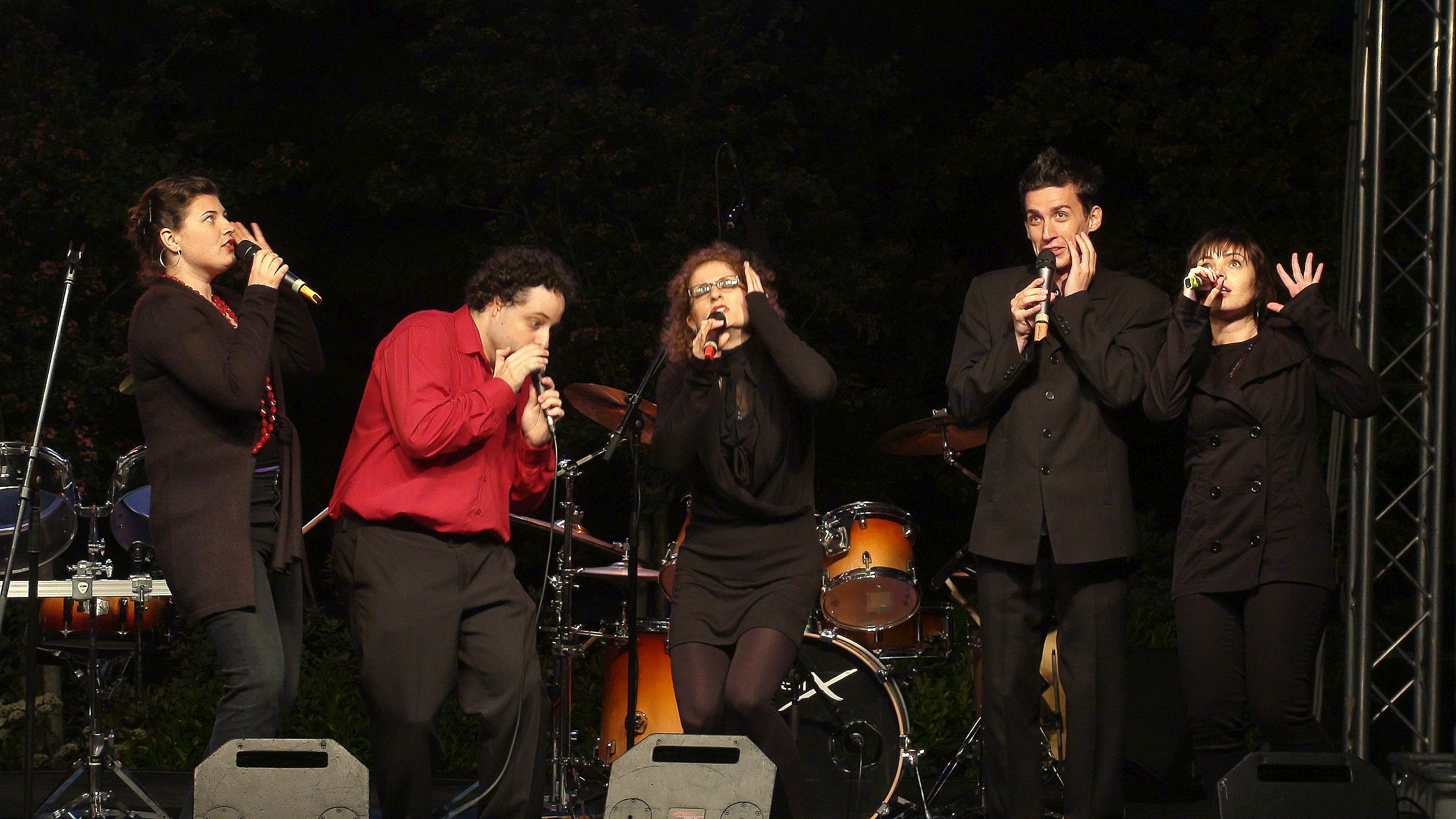
Windsingers performing in the Telki Festival

Kayamar signed his contract with his future manager, László Ágoston in 2011 and published his first YouTube video of a medley of his own compositions soon after. Among classical musicians this became popular fast, but they got real media attention after Kayamar's first Guinness World Record attempt on singing the lowest bass line ever. He won the 1st prize in T-mobile's composers' competition and started to perform on stage soon. The only disadvantage of this hype was that Kayamar became famous as the lowest bass of Hungary while he wanted to be successful mainly as a composer and jazz singer.

=== Finding his place ===
Kayamar was invited to perform in places like the Palace of Arts or the music festival, the Sziget. He published his first CD with his own compositions on the lyrics of the Dutch singer-songwriter Robert Keder in December, 2012. He performs alone but also with the Moltopera Company, Renáta Göncz and his a cappella group, the Windsingers.

=== The Hertz-pitch ===
Kayamar has a so-called logarithmic or Hertz-pitch better than the absolute pitch that is widely considered to be the highest level of musical hearing. He is able not just to identify and re-create musical notes without using a reference but he can tell how many Hertz he hears or sings. This way Kayamar is able to use much smaller intervals than quarter tones.

=== "The Hungarian Bobby McFerrin" ===
Kayamar's real speciality is the multitrack improvisation - he composes real time in multiple parts. He has composed choral works live or cooperated with guest singers but is also able to use his own voice with an instrument called looper pedal. He records and plays back the parts of a vocal or choir and improvises over it. For this unique technique he is many times compared to the American jazz a cappella vocalist and conductor Bobby McFerrin.

== Albums published ==
Music from the wind (2012 demo-album)

1. The Wind Song
2. Dark Desert
3. Underground
4. Shadow Rose
5. The Great Escape
6. Tears Endrolet
7. The Raining Days
8. Come Again
9. Going Places
10. Silence
11. Lines
12. Via Dies Irae – Haragom napja
13. The Spider Web
14. Nature Waves
15. Wind Song Reprise

== Sources ==
- Website (in Hungarian)
- TV2 Aktív "A legmélyebb basszus"
- Kayamar interview on Origo.hu
