= Béla Bartók Music Institute =

Music school

Coordinates: 47.5025°N 19.0621°E

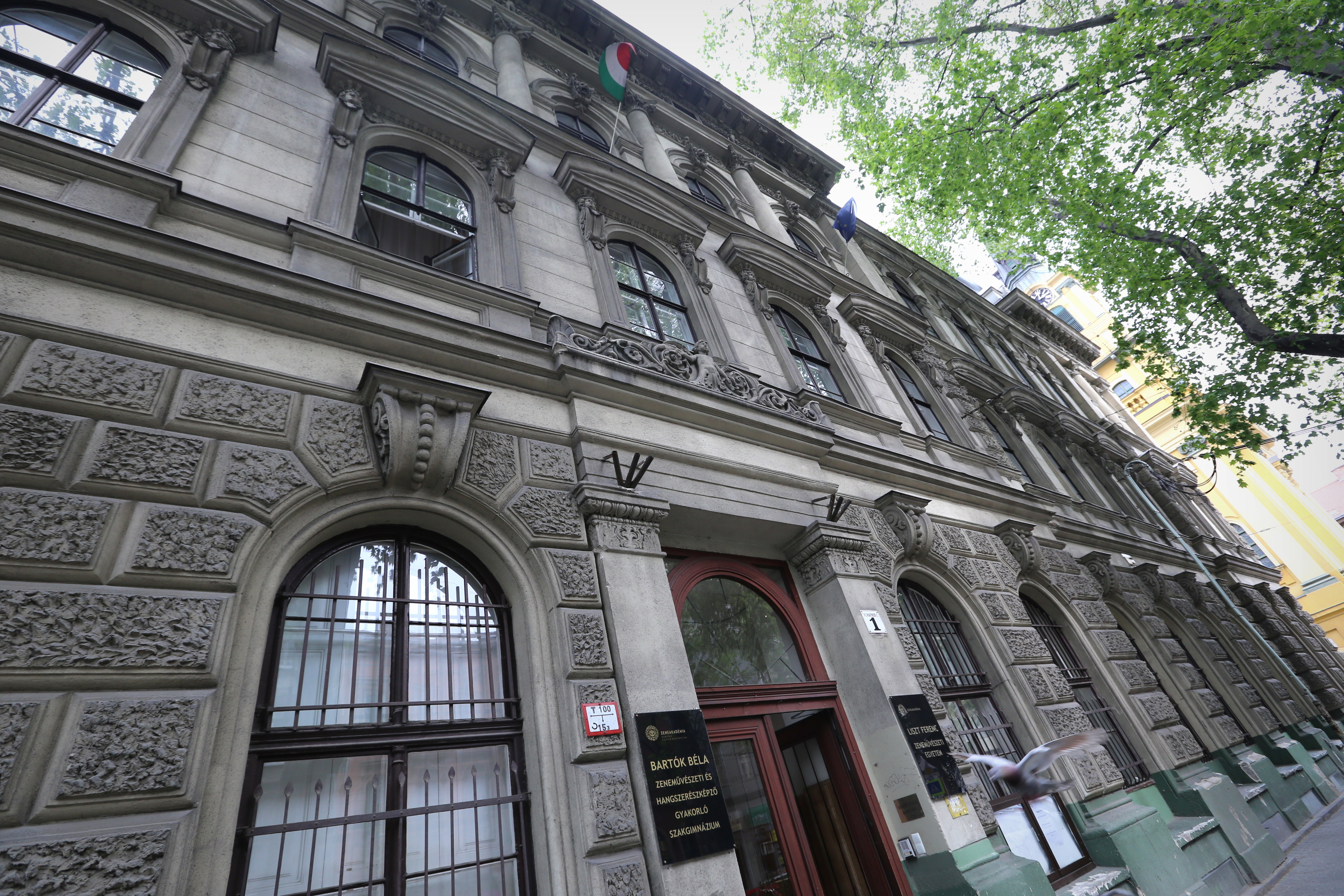
Béla Bartók Music Institute

The Béla Bartók Music Institute (Hungarian: Bartók Béla Zeneművészeti Szakközépiskola) is a college of the University of Miskolc in Miskolc, Hungary, specializing in music education. Founded in 1966, it is named for Béla Bartók, the Hungarian composer.

Located in Bartók Square, the school resides in the Palace of Music, neo-baroque building completed between 1926 and 1927.

== Educational programs ==
The Béla Bartók Music Institute hosts programs including: Bachelor of Arts in Composition and Musicology, Bachelor of Arts in Performing Arts, Master of Arts in Performing Arts, and various music education programs.

== Notable alumni ==
- Csaba Tőri, choir conductor
