= Windsingers =

Hungarian a cappella group

WindSingers
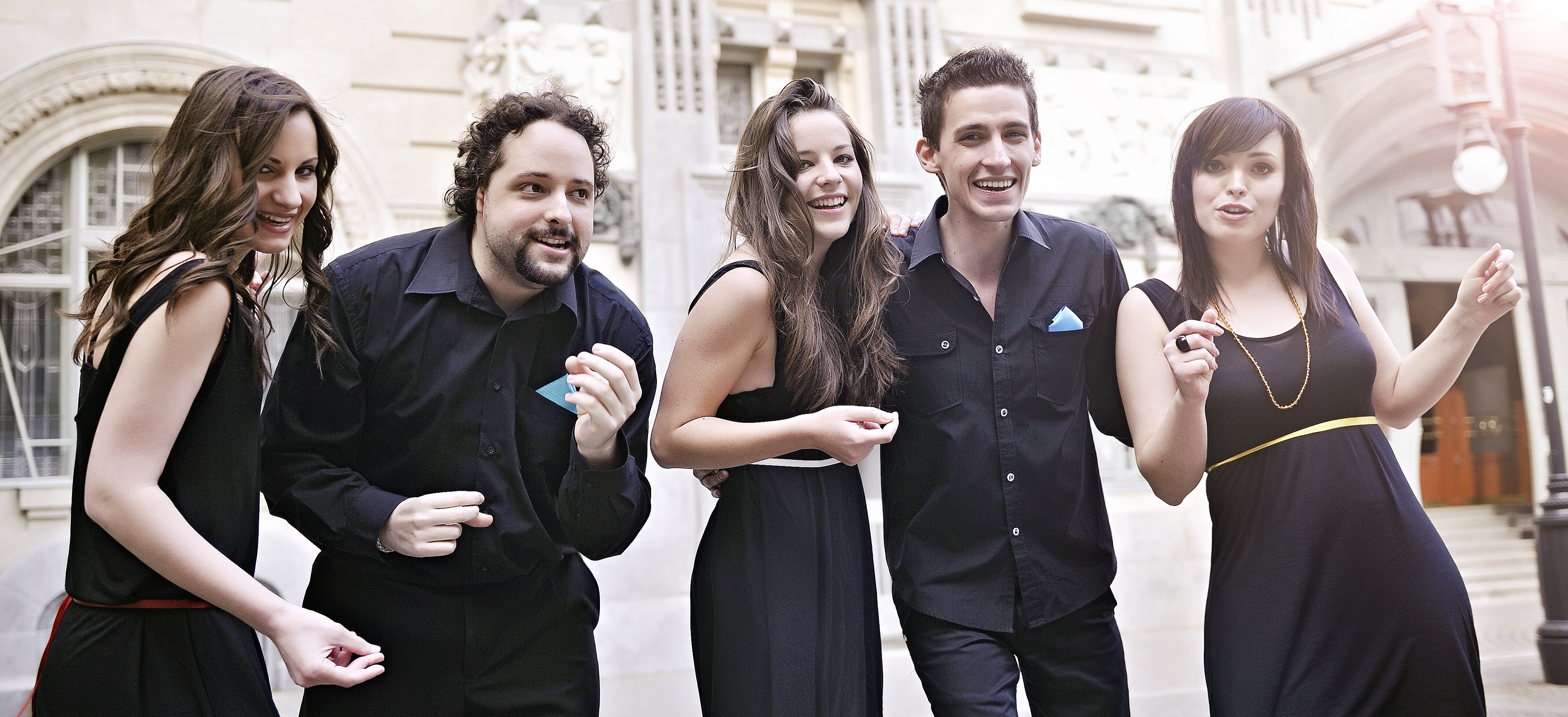
- WindSingers from left to right: Hanna Törőcsik, Viktor Magyaróvári "Kayamar", Fanni Gazda, Márton Nagy-György, Dóra Vers

Background information
- Origin: Hungarian
- Genres: a cappella, jazz
- Years active: 2011–present
- Members: Kayamar, Hanna Törőcsik, Dóra Vers, Fanni Gazda, Márton Nagy-György
- Past members: Eliza Popper, Veronika Földi, Nóra Tasi, Cintia Horváth

WindSingers is a Hungarian a cappella group singing mostly jazz, its own pop arrangements and the compositions of Kayamar who is also the bass singer of the group.

== Founding ==
In 2011 Dóra Vers (mezzo), Veronika Földi (alto) and Márton Nagy-György (tenor) founded the group in the jazz faculty of the Béla Bartók Conservatory. They started to cooperate with the singer-composer Viktor Magyaróvári (Kayamar), whom they knew from the classical faculty of the Conservatory. Kayamar's bass-line (many articles count him as one of the lowest basses on earth) and his arrangements highly determine the image of the group.

== Recent activity ==
The WindSingers went through many changes during the years but the goal to perform pop and jazz songs on the highest level stayed. They became one of the most successful a cappella group in Hungary and in the last years they had many concerts in Austria, Slovakia, Serbia and Romania too. The WindSingers became a regular guest at the Budapest Jazz Club which is one of the most prestigious jazz stages in Hungary. In the summer of 2013 and 2014 the group won one-one silver diploma during the vokal.total a cappella competition in Pop and Jazz categories. In the summer of 2015 their first album was released called "The Morning Comes".
