= European Journal of Minority Studies =

- Discipline: European studies
- Language: English, German
- Edited by: Christoph Pan, Franz Matscher, Manfred Kittel, Matthias Theodor Vogt, Paul Videsott.

Publication details
- History: 2008–present
- Publisher: Berliner Wissenschafts-Verlag (Germany)
- Frequency: Quarterly

Standard abbreviations
- ISO 4: Eur. J. Minor. Stud.

Indexing
- ISSN: 1865-1089 (print); 1865-1097 (web)
- OCLC no.: 890628085

Links
- Journal homepage; Journal archive (2008-2012)

The European Journal of Minority Studies is a quarterly peer-reviewed academic journal published by Berliner Wissenschafts-Verlag on behalf of the South Tyrolean Institute of Ethnic Groups (Bolzano). It covers minority languages, cultures, and identities. The journal was established in 2008 and originally published by Springer Science + Business Media. From 2013 to 2015 it was published by Verlag Österreich, moving to its current publisher in 2016. The editors-in-chief are Christoph Pan (South Tyrolean Institute of Ethnic Groups, University of Innsbruck), Franz Matscher (University of Salzburg), Manfred Kittel (University of Regensburg), Matthias Theodor Vogt (Hochschule Zittau-Görlitz), and Paul Videsott (Free University of Bozen, South Tyrolean Institute of Ethnic Groups).
