= Made in Hungaria =

- Theatrical release poster
- Directed by: Gergely Fonyó
- Written by: István Tasnádi; Miklós Fenyő; Norbert Köbli
- Starring: Tamás Szabó Kimmel; Tünde Kiss; Iván Fenyő
- Music by: Gábor Novai; Miklós Fenyő
- Production company: EMI Music
- Distributed by: Next Station Productions; HCC Media Group; Sunny Film
- Release date: 5 February 2009
- Running time: 109 minutes
- Country: Hungary
- Language: Hungarian

Made in Hungaria is a 2009 Hungarian comedy-musical film written by István Tasnádi, Miklós Fenyő and Norbert Köbli and directed by Gergely Fonyó. Adapted from a stage musical with the same title, it follows the life of a group of teens from Hungary in the late 1960s, while the country was under Communist rule. The film received generally positive reviews.

== Plot ==
Forced to return to Communist Hungary from America with his parents, Miki (Tamás Szabó Kimmel) brings a rebellious attitude, a trunkful of rock records, and an ambition to be the next Jerry Lee Lewis. He falls foul of the family's minder, Comrade Bigali (Peter Scherer), and is forced to perform a nationalistic folk song with Bigali's son in the school talent show. His rocking performance wins everyone over and redeems him with his friends and his girl, Vera (Tünde Kiss).

== Cast ==
- Tamás Szabó Kimmel as Miki
- Tünde Kiss as Vera
- Iván Fenyő as Röné
- Titánia Valentin as Marina
- Péter Scherer as Bigali
- Tamás Dunai as Miki's father
- Éva Vándor as Miki's mother
- Lehel Kovács as Csipu
- Ákos Orosz as Tripolisz
- Vajk Szente as Kisnyirõ
- Géza Hegedüs D. as Miltényi
- Judit Kocsis as Miltényiné
- Péter Egri as Brenner
- Péter Puskás as Sampon
- Antal Cserna as Balogh

== Reception ==
The film was well received in Hungary and a reviewer for the Associated Press at the Cannes Film Festival described it as a "not very original storyline" redeemed by "top-notch actors", especially Kimmel, whose first lead role this was, and Scherer, who "evoke[s] pathos" despite the silliness of his role as the toadying party functionary.
