= Matthias Theodor Vogt =

- Born: 5 May 1959 (age 67); Rome
- Education: Technische Universität Berlin
- Alma mater: LMU Munich
- Known for: Founding director of the Saxonian Institute for Cultural Infrastructure
- Scientific career
- Fields: History, musicology
- Workplaces: Hochschule Zittau/Görlitz
- Thesis: (1988)
- Doctoral advisor: Carl Dahlhaus

Matthias Theodor Vogt (born 5 May 1959) is a German academic with a focus on cultural policy and an author of studies on cultural conditions that might serve to strengthen the democratic potential in diverse European countries. Between 1992 and 1995, Vogt developed the overall blueprint for the Free State of Saxony’s law on cultural areas, and contributed to its acceptance and implementation. Since 1994 he has acted as the founding director of the Saxonian Institute for Cultural Infrastructure (Institut für kulturelle Infrastruktur Sachsen) and since 1997 has been Professor for Cultural Policy and Cultural History at the Zittau/Görlitz University of Applied Sciences (Hochschule Zittau/Görlitz). In 2012, Vogt was made honorary professor of the University of Pécs and in 2014 was awarded the Officer’s Cross of the Order of Merit of the Republic of Poland for his contributions to German-Polish cooperation. Matthias Theodor Vogt is a Roman Catholic; he is married and has three children.

== Biography ==
Matthias Theodor Vogt grew up in Freiburg im Breisgau, Germany. He is a grandson of Theodor Spira (1881-1961), an anglicist in Königsberg, who was expelled from the university by the National Socialists on account of his political and religious beliefs and worked after the War in the Hessian government for reconciliation with Israel. Vogt is a nephew of Andreas Spira (1929-2004), a classical philologist from Mainz, a brother of Gregor Vogt-Spira (b. 1956), a Latinist in Marburg, and a brother of Markus Vogt (b. 1962), Professor of Social Ethics at LMU Munich.

Vogt studied violoncello under Nikolaus Uhlenhut at the Basel Music Academy and later under Atis Teichmanis at the Freiburg Conservatory of Music. He subsequently studied Theatrical Arts, Philosophy, German Studies and Musicology at various German and French universities (LMU Munich, the New Sorbonne University, the Aix-Marseille University and Technische Universität Berlin). During his studentship in Munich, Vogt was a private secretary to Hans Lamm, President of the Jewish community in Munich and Upper Bavaria. In 1983, he obtained the degree of Master of Arts under Klaus Lazarowicz and Susanne Vill. In 1988, he received the degree of Doctor of Philosophy (Dr. phil.) working under Carl Dahlhaus at Technische Universität Berlin, and in 2008 a post-doctoral qualification (Dr. habil.) at the University of Pécs. Among other functions, he has worked as an evaluator for the Volkswagen Foundation and for the German Academic Scholarship Foundation (Studienstiftung). Since 1983, Vogt has been giving lectures in German, English, French and Italian, mainly in Europe, Japan and in the United States.

Between 1979 and 1985 Vogt wrote a number of articles on contemporary musical theatre and contemporary music for German and Austrian newspapers (Frankfurter Allgemeine Zeitung, Neue Zeitschrift für Musik, Österreichische Musikzeitschrift, Falter Wien). He also worked as a music correspondent for German (Sender Freies Berlin, Bayerischer Rundfunk, Westdeutscher Rundfunk, Saarländischer Rundfunk), Austrian (Österreichischer Rundfunk) and French broadcasting companies (Radio France Musique Paris).

From 1986 to 1989, Vogt was Director of the press department at the Bayreuth Festival, with responsibility for the programme booklets. Both before and after this period, he worked at the Salzburg Festival, the Shanghai Conservatory of Music, the Vienna State Opera, La Scala in Milan, the Venice Biennale, the Rousse State Opera, the Moscow Operetta, the Théâtre du Châtelet, Paris and the Acquario Romano, Rome. He collaborated with Luigi Nono, Luciano Berio and Karlheinz Stockhausen in the world premieres of Prometeo, Un Re in Ascolto and Samstag aus Licht.

Matthias Theodor Vogt is the "father" of the Saxonian law on cultural regions (Sächsisches Kulturraumgesetz), the first German law that obligates the state to provide financial support for local authorities developing and endorsing their cultural institutions and programmes. Subsequently, this law has been proposed as a model for the other federal states by the "Culture in Germany" commission of the German Bundestag. Vogt developed the overall blueprint of the law, and until 1995 contributed to its promulgation and implementation as the coordinator of Saxonian cultural regions. In November 1995, he was offered a post in the State Ministry of Science and Art by the Saxon premier, Kurt Biedenkopf, but declined.

In 1994, State Minister Hans Joachim Meyer and Matthias Theodor Vogt founded the Saxonian Institute of Cultural Infrastructure (Institut für kulturelle Infrastruktur Sachsen). Since then, Vogt has acted as its director. In 2014 the President of the Bundesrat of Germany, Norbert Lammert, acknowledged the Institute’s work over its first twenty years.

In 1997 Vogt was appointed Professor of cultural policy and cultural history in the Faculty of Management and Cultural Studies at Zittau/Görlitz University. In 2001-2005 he co-chaired a programme of studies at the TU Dresden. Every summer semester in the early 2000s, Vogt held diverse guest professorships, from 2002 to 2010 at the Charles University in Prague, in 2003 at the University of Wrocław, in 2006 and 2014 at the University of Kobe, in 2009 at the University of Sannio, in 2012 at the Jagiellonian University in Kraków, and in 2013 and 2014 at the University of Vienna. Apart from these long-term obligations, Vogt taught at some 50 universities mainly in Europe, Japan and in the USA

In 1997, Vogt founded the course of study "Culture and Management" as a cooperative venture between the Saxonian Institute of Cultural Infrastructure and Zittau/Görlitz University of Applied Sciences. Its patron Federico Mayor, Director General of UNESCO, said of the specific approach: "Mobilizing support for the arts has become an art in itself. It calls for individuals combining economic flair, a grasp of social legislation, familiarity with an increasingly diverse cultural scene, and an uncompromising commitment to meticulous organization." In 1998 the study programme was awarded a prize by the Stifterverband für die Deutsche Wissenschaft.

== Research targeting the political praxis ==
Since 1990 Vogt has devoted himself to research into the cultural basis of transformation processes in Europe. He takes great interest in strengthening democratic potentials, not least beyond the metropolitan cities into the German and European peripheries, and in methodological aspects of cultural policy studies.

In 2016, he presented a research study on the cultural implications of migration: Ankommen in der deutschen Lebenswelt (Arrival in the German World). The study is based on previous research such as Minderheiten- und Fremdenfreundlichkeit am Wiederbeginn europäischer Staatlichkeit (Welcoming attitudes towards minorities and foreigners at the re-inception of European statehood), Der Fremde als Bereicherung (The Foreigner as Enrichment) and Minderheiten als Mehrwert (Minorities as Value Added) – all of these studies having been conducted in the framework of the tri-national Görlitz-Zgorzelec-Zhořelec Institute for Advanced Study, Collegium Pontes. In 2002-2009 the latter researched into the fundamental issues of social cohesion in Europe under the common patronage of the German, Polish and Czech Foreign Ministers.

Vogt has also studied the principal-agent potentials for strengthening regional public spirit in variously-sized cities, e.g. in large-sized Erlangen, in the medium-sized towns of Landsberg am Lech and Pforzheim, in small-sized Altötting and in rural communities such as Gundelsheim near Bamberg.

For the Bundestag’s "Culture in Germany" commission of inquiry, Vogt analysed the contribution made by churches and religious communities to cultural life in Germany.

In the field of minorities policy, he on various occasions researched into the Lusatian Sorbs and into the situation in the Caucasus.

Vogt is a co-editor of such periodicals as Europäisches Journal für Minderheitenfragen / European Journal of Minority Studies EJM (Wien, Berlin), Rivista Interdisciplinare di Studi Europei / Review of Interdisciplinary Studies on Europe RISE (Neapel), Culture Management – Kulturmanagement – Zarządzanie Kulturą (trilingual) and Towarzystwo Doktorantów Uniwersytetu Jagiellońskiego (both Kraków).

He has published some 400 books and articles as author, co-author, editor and co-editor

In the context of analyses of the soft power potential in Africa, Vogt accepted in February 2018 the invitation of the Personal Africa Representative of the Federal Chancellor and Africa Representative of the Federal Ministry for Economic Cooperation and Development, Günter Nooke, on a delegation journey "On the Cultural and Religious Dimension of Sustainability" to Ghana and Cameroon, and organized the return visit of twelve traditional authorities from sub-Saharan Africa (Cameroon, Benin, Gabon) to the Free State of Saxony in June 2018. In the run-up to a media public discussion between the Africa Representative and the Association of Professors in African Languages on 13 February 2019, the Federal Ministry for Economic Cooperation and Development asked Vogt for an assessment of the letter of 15 November 2018, addressed personally to the Federal Minister with numerous word mistakes and in which the Association had called for Nooke to be dismissed. Only the analysis, coordinated with two other colleagues, showed that the chairman of the association had copied an "open letter" from Cologne of 14.11.2018 (presumably a student's letter in view of the mistakes) by copy&paste and converted it into a personally addressed letter to the Federal Minister, using her official address at the University of Hamburg, without stating the copy&paste borrowing from students. This is problematic in the sense of the DFG guidelines on good scientific behaviour (quod licet bovi, non licet Iovi), but is at most an internal matter of the University of Hamburg, not of the Federal Government. The report therefore recommended not to inform the public about the assessment, only the Hamburg professor and her university. The BMZ's request of 08.02.2019 for an evaluation of the professors' association's letter was triggered by a press invitation of 07.02.2019 from the association which had not been coordinated with the BMZ. In this invitation, the chairman of the association had repeated the accusations of 15.11.2018, which was tantamount to a prejudgement of Nookes before the discussion and questioned the meaning of the discussion. In a concluding note Vogt summed up (following Thomas Bauer: Die Vereindeutigung der Welt, 2018): "The 'causa' Nooke is exemplary for post-factual hypability, as it is called in New German. This means testing how - in a right-left shortening tunnel and detached from the factual situation - in our beautiful and perhaps precisely for this reason so often agitated country attention can be hedged. A fact-based MINT thinking like that of Günter Nooke, however, is not per se a right thinking, a humanities thinking open to polyvalences like that of the Africanists is not automatically a left thinking. And both are not incompatible either. In the theory of resilience, the Federal Republic finds itself in a highly dangerous, simplifying reduction and interlocking trap. The political extreme margins profit most from this trap".

== Political activity ==
Vogt is aligned with the social wing of the Christian Democratic Union (CDU). He is regularly consulted by all German parties within the democratic spectrum. Vogt belongs to the social wing of the Christian Democratic Union of Germany and regularly works for all parties in the democratic spectrum. For his political stance in the migration discourse see the interview by Alexander Smoltczyk in Der Spiegel of 04.05.2017. Vogt is a candidate of the Christian Democratic Union of Germany in the elections to the European Parliament on 26 May 2019.

== Civil society ==
- 1985-1986: an initiator of a Holocaust Memorial in the Berlin Tiergarten district in cooperation with Fumikatsu Inoue, Jerusalem, and Martin Sperlich, Berlin (not realized)
- 1991-1994: executive board member of the international music festival in Tegernsee (art director: Natalja Gutman).
- 1993-1998: executive board member of the E. O. Plauen association in Plauen (president: Willi Daume).
- Since 1998: member of the association for the award of the Brückepreis for international understanding. President 1999 (laureate: Freya von Moltke, laudator:Władysław Bartoszewski), 2000 (laureate: Arno Lustiger, laudator: Wolf Biermann).

== Awards ==
- 1998 award of the Stifterverband für die Deutsche Wissenschaft for the UNESCO-programme of studies "Culture and Management Görlitz" (Germany)
- 2000 Franz Kafka Medal, Prague (Czech Republic)
- 2000 prize of the European Union of Arts, Brussels (Belgium) for the support of culture and the arts
- 2012 Eötvös József Medal of the Academy of Eötvös József, Baja (Hungary)
- 2014 Officer’s Cross of the Order of Merit of the Republic of Poland (Poland)

== Selected publications ==
- with Erik Fritzsche, Christoph Meißelbach: Ankommen in der deutschen Lebenswelt. Migranten-Enkulturation und regionale Resilienzstärkung. Geleitwort von Rita Süssmuth und Nachwort von Olaf Zimmermann. Europäisches Journal für Minderheitenfragen Vol. 9 No. 1-2 2016. Berliner Wissenschafts-Verlag 2016, ISBN Print: 978-3-8305-3716-8, E-Book: 978-3-8305-2975-0, ISSN Print: 1865-1089, Online: 1865-1097.
- Wie weiter in der Armenienfrage? Ein Vorschlag zu den möglichen politischen Folgerungen aus dem „Ökumenischen Gottesdienst im Berliner Dom anläßlich der Erinnerung an den Völkermord an Armeniern, Aramäern und Pontos-Griechen“ am 23. April 2015 und der „Debatte zu den Deportationen und Massakern an den Armeniern vor 100 Jahren“ im Deutschen Bundestag am 24. April 2015. Europäisches Journal für Minderheitenfragen Vol 8 No 3 2015. Verlag Österreich, Wien 2015.
- with Olaf Zimmermann (Hrsg.): Verödung? Kulturpolitische Gegenstrategien. Beiträge zur Tagung 22./23. November 2013 in Görlitz. Veranstalter: Deutscher Kulturrat und Institut für kulturelle Infrastruktur Sachsen. Edition kulturelle Infrastruktur, Görlitz und Berlin 2013.
- with Katarzyna Plebańczyk, Massimo Squillante, Irena Alperyte (editors): Brain Gain through Culture? Researching the Development of Middle Size Cities in Poland, Lithuania, Italy, Hungary, Germany, and France. DOI 10.1696/KOL-2012. Görlitz 2012.
- with the collaboration of Vladimir Kreck und den Fellows des Collegium Pontes Görlitz-Zgorzelec-Zhořelec: Empfehlungen zur Stärkung der sorbischen Minderheit durch Schaffung eines abgestimmten Selbstverwaltungs-, Kooperations-, Projekt- und Institutionenclusters. Europäisches Journal für Minderheitenfragen Vol. 5 No. 4. Wien 2012. S. 211-430.
- with the collaboration of Isabell Ehrlicher, Amandine Laïk, Carolin Eisner, Ulf Großmann: Kultur für Landberg. Stärkung der Innenstadt durch Aufwertung der kulturellen Infrastruktur sowie Erhalt und Entwicklung der einschlägig genutzten Baudenkmäler. Görlitz 2012.
- What is Cultural Policy? Was ist Kulturpolitik? Czym jest polityka kulturalna? In: Emil Orzechowski et al. (Hrsg.): Vol. III (3) Culture management. Kulturmanagement. Zarządzanie kulturą, Krakau 2010. S. 113–136, 15–39, 213–237.
- with Jan Sokol, Dieter Bingen, Jürgen Neyer und Albert Löhr (Hrsg.): Minderheiten als Mehrwert. (= Schriften des Collegium Pontes. Band VI). Frankfurt am Main u. a. 2010, ISBN 978-3-631-60239-3.
- with Jan Sokol, Dieter Bingen, Jürgen Neyer und Albert Löhr (Hrsg.): Der Fremde als Bereicherung. (= Schriften des Collegium Pontes. Band V). Frankfurt u. a. 2010, ISBN 978-3-631-60233-1.
- with Jan Sokol, Beate Ociepka, Detlef Pollack und Beata Mikołajczyk (Hrsg.): Europäisierung im Alltag. (= Schriften des Collegium Pontes. Band IV). Frankfurt am Main u. a. 2009, ISBN 978-3-631-58033-2.
- with Jan Sokol, Beate Ociepka, Detlef Pollack und Beata Mikołajczyk (Hrsg.): Die Stärke der Schwäche. (= Schriften des Collegium Pontes. Band III). Frankfurt am Main u. a. 2009, ISBN 978-3-631-58032-5.
- with Jan Sokol, Beate Ociepka, Detlef Pollack und Beata Mikołajczyk (Hrsg.): Peripherie in der Mitte Europas. (= Schriften des Collegium Pontes. Band II). Frankfurt am Main u. a. 2009, ISBN 978-3-631-58031-8.
- with Jan Sokol, Beate Ociepka, Detlef Pollack und Beata Mikołajczyk (Hrsg.): Bedingungen europäischer Solidarität. (= Schriften des Collegium Pontes. Band I). Frankfurt am Main u. a. 2009, ISBN 978-3-631-58030-1.
- Der Beitrag der Kirchen und Religionsgemeinschaften zum kulturellen Leben in Deutschland. In: Deutscher Bundestag (Hrsg.): Kultur in Deutschland. Schlußbericht der Enquete-Kommission des Deutschen Bundestages. Deutscher Bundestag, K.-Drs. 15/414b. Regensburg 2008, ISBN 978-3-932581-93-9.
- (Hrsg.): „Kulturräume in Sachsen. Eine Dokumentation. Mit einer photographischen Annäherung von Bertram Kober und dem Rechtsgutachten von Fritz Ossenbühl". (= Kulturelle Infrastruktur Band I). Universitätsverlag, Leipzig 1. Auflage 1994, 2. Auflage 1996, 3. Auflage 1997, ISBN 3-931922-04-9.
- (Hrsg.) Das Gustav-Mahler-Fest Hamburg 1989. Kassel/ Basel/ London/ New York 1991, ISBN 3-7618-1015-6.
- Die Genese der Histoire du Soldat von Charles-Ferdinand Ramuz, Igor Strawinsky und René Auberjonois. Bamberg 1989 (Zugleich Dissertation an der Technische Universität Berlin|TU Berlin 1989).
