= National Theatre of Pécs =

Pécsi Nemzeti Színház
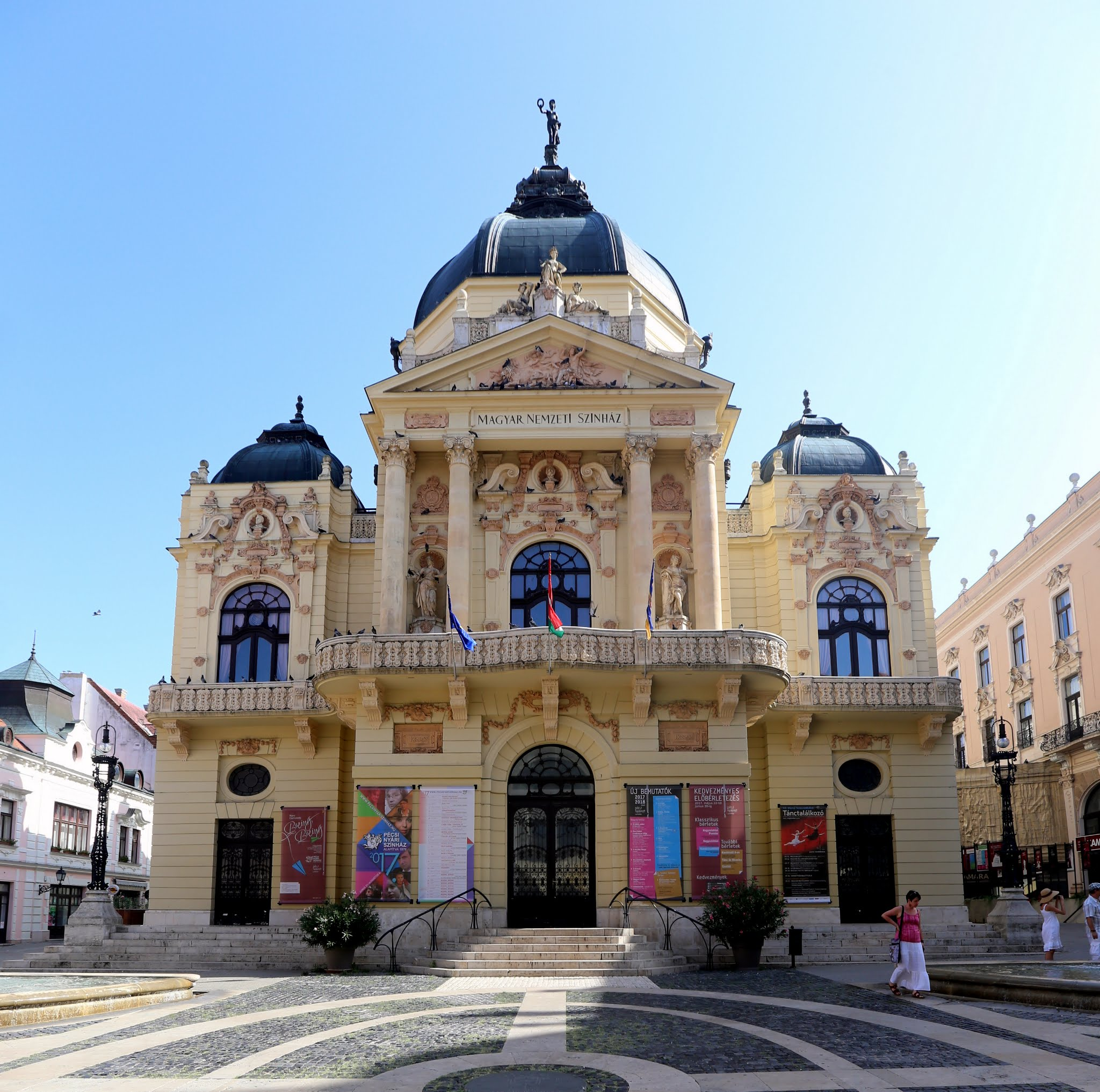
- Interactive map of Pécsi Nemzeti Színház
- Address: Színház square 1
- Location: Pécs, Baranya county, Hungary
- Coordinates: 46°4′34″N 18°13′50.5″E
- Capacity: 455
- Type: Theatre

Construction
- Built: 1890-1895
- Opened: 1895
- Renovated: 1986-1991

Website
- National Theatre of Pécs

The National Theatre of Pécs is the main theatre of Pécs, Hungary.

== History ==
Theatrical plays became a regular attraction in the city from the beginning of the 19th century in German and Hungarian language. Most often they were arranged in larger dancing halls, inns, the small stage of Tettye or the Elefánt-house Inn. While being continuously planned from 1815 onwards, the first theatre opened only in 1840 in the Mária street. Demolished in 1890, only a sketch of the facade remained from this building.

To meet the demand for a high-quality structure, the city council set up a committee, led by mayor János Aidinger to coordinate the planning. The design competition of 1890 was won by Adolf Lang and Adolf Steinhardt, who, in cooperation with the renowned Fellner-Helmer duo, and 10 000 Ft granted by the county council, started the construction. The premiere was held on 5 October 1895 with the play Bánk bán.

The theatre became nationalized between 1949 and 1989. The chamber theatre was opened, which was transformed to a children's theatre from 1965. After the theatre building's deterioration worsened in the middle of the 1980s, a 5 year long reconstruction started in 1986, equipping the theatre with a modern orchestra pit and new machinery.

== Sources ==
- Győző, Bezerédy. Száz pécsi évad : a Pécsi Nemzeti Színház száz éve. Pécs : Baranya Megyei Könyvtár, 1995. ISBN 978-963-7272-90-5
- National Theatre of Pécs in the Hungarian Theatrical Lexicon (György, Székely. Magyar Színházmuvészeti Lexikon. Budapest: Akadémiai Kiadó, 1994. ISBN 978-963-05-6635-3), freely available on mek.oszk.hu
