= András Fekete-Győr =

Hungarian politician

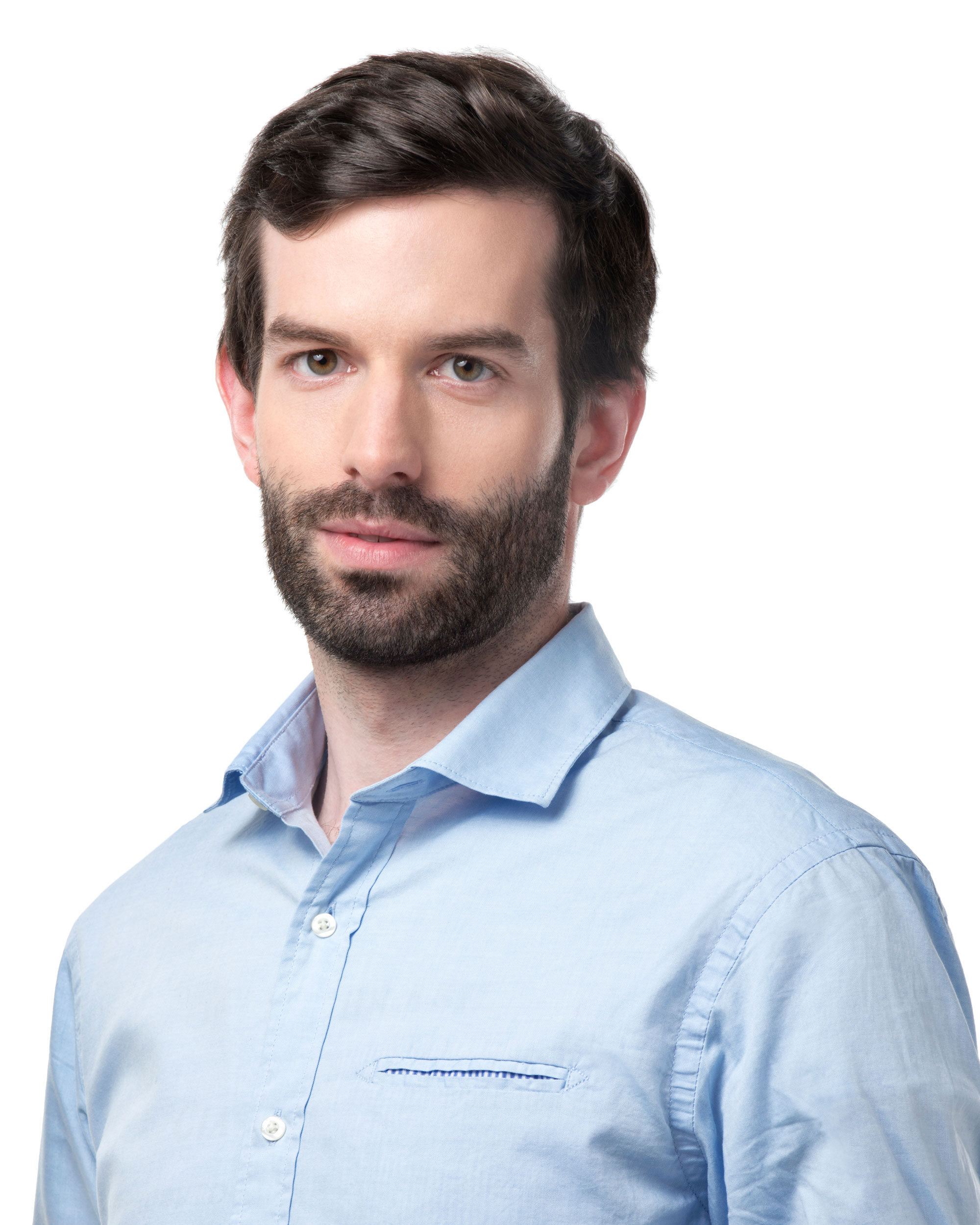

President of Momentum Movement
- In office August 2016 – 10 October 2021
- Preceded by: office established
- Succeeded by: Anna Orosz (interim)

Member of the National Assembly
- In office 2 May 2022 – 25 November 2024

Personal details
- Born: 13 April 1989 (age 37) Budapest, Hungary
- Party: Momentum Movement (2017–2026)
- Education: Eötvös Loránd University; Heidelberg University
- Profession: Political activist

András Fekete-Győr (born 13 April 1989) is a Hungarian activist, lawyer and politician. He was the inaugural leader of the Momentum Movement (Hungarian: Momentum Mozgalom) party from 2016 to 2021. Fekete-Győr became a nationally known political figure, when he led the successful NOlimpia campaign against the Budapest bid for the 2024 Summer Olympics, which was one of the first major blows for the national conservative government of Fidesz and its leader Viktor Orbán, who governed the country with a two-thirds majority from 2010 to 2026.

Under the leadership of Fekete-Győr, the Momentum Movement subsequently was transformed itself into a political party. Although the party failed to reach the 5% threshold in the 2018 parliamentary election, the 2019 EP election and the 2019 local elections saw great successes for the Momentum Movement, which soon became the second or third strongest party within the opposition. Fekete-Győr run as prime ministerial candidate in the 2021 opposition primary, but was forced to resign as party leader because of his poor result in October 2021. Fekete-Győr was a member of parliament from 2022 to 2024, when he was stripped of his mandate after a court ruling.

== Family ==
András Fekete-Győr was born into an intellectual family on 13 April 1989 in Budapest. His maternal great-grandfather was jurist and economist Ödön Kuncz (1884–1965), a theorist of mercantile law. His maternal grandfather József Kuncz, also a lawyer, participated in the revolutionary political committee during the Hungarian Revolution of 1956; therefore, he was banned from the national bar association until his political rehabilitation in the 1960s.

His paternal grandfather was agricultural engineer Endre Fekete-Győr (1926–1999), member of the Hungarian Socialist Workers' Party (MSZMP) and Chairman of the Council of Heves County between 1969 and 1981. His father is András Fekete-Győr, Sr. (born 1956), Deputy Managing Director of the National Deposit Insurance Fund (OBA) since 1993, managing director from 2010 to 2018.

== Education ==
He went to primary school in Solymár and then to the Ferenc Toldy High School, where from he graduated in 2008. He then continued to the Eötvös Loránd University (ELTE) with an Erasmus visit to the Ruprecht-Karls University in Heidelberg, Germany. He earned a degree of law at the Faculty of Law of the Eötvös Loránd University in 2015.

As a legal trainee, he worked for the law firm of Péter Nagy and László Trócsányi for few months in 2013, then attended in an internship at the International Chamber of Commerce (ICC) in 2014. He worked for General Electric in Budapest as an accounts receivables manager for four months in 2015. In 2016, he studied political science at the Humboldt University in Berlin as part of a German international parliamentary scholarship.

== Political career ==
=== Leader of Momentum ===
After working at a few different firms, he decided in January 2014 to return to Hungary to start a political movement. In 2015 the Momentum Movement was founded by 9 people. Fekete-Győr was elected leader of the movement in August 2016. The movement only appeared in public in early 2017, when Fekete-Győr and his supporters initiated the NOlimpia campaign, a signature-collection campaign to stop Budapest's bid to host the 2024 Summer Olympics. The campaign was successful; after NOlimpia collected 266,151 signatures (of 138,000 required to automatically trigger a public referendum), the national government preemptively withdrew the city's bid. After the success, Momentum was soon transformed into a party; Fekete-Győr was elected its inaugural leader on 4 March 2017. The party held a mass protest on 1 May 2017, the thirteenth anniversary of Hungary's accession to the European Union. Fekete-Győr criticized Viktor Orbán's foreign policy towards Russia and the post-Soviet dictatorships. He also announced that Momentum would participate in the 2018 parliamentary election.

On May 18, 2017, Fekete-Győr caused controversy after he and other Momentum members walked into the offices of pro-government news portal origo.hu without permission. The protesters tried to ask a journalist about an article suggesting—falsely, Momentum claimed—that another leader of the movement had embezzled funds from an earlier start-up venture. Pro-government media portrayed the event as a break-in, and Fekete-Győr as threatening, although independent media (e.g. index.hu) were also critical of Fekete-Győr's tactics.

Under his leadership, the Momentum Movement failed to reach 5% threshold during the 2018 parliamentary election. Subsequently, Fekete-Győr initiated a vote of confidence against himself and the three head directors of the party temporarily took over leadership in May 2018. A majority of the delegates assured him of their support during the vote. In December 2018, during the anti-government protests, Fekete-Győr threw a smoke grenade at police officers at a protest for which he is currently under criminal investigation. He is facing 1 to 5 years of imprisonment. In April 2019, Momentum was registered for the 2019 European Parliament election. On May 26, 2019, the party obtained 9.86% of the popular vote (becoming the third largest party in the election), thus meeting the 5% threshold: two candidates from the party were elected to the European Parliament. In the 2019 local election the party managed to win mayoral positions in three Budapest districts and 29 seats in counties' assemblies (mostly in Pest County).

=== 2021 opposition primary ===
The Momentum Movement joined the electoral alliance of six opposition parties, which intended to run jointly in the 2022 parliamentary election. Fekete-Győr decided to run as candidate for the position of prime minister in the 2021 opposition primary. Fekete-Győr campaigned for the introduction of a four-day working week and a Finnish-type education system. He announced his programme in February 2021, which included the so-called "Felcsút trials" against Prime Minister Viktor Orbán and his corrupt system (NER). He strongly opposed the introduction of the anti-LGBT law and also criticized fellow opposition party Jobbik and its leader Péter Jakab for their support. YouTube channel Partizán conducted an interview with him in April 2021, where he seemed indecisive, uncertain and insincere on many issues, which eroded his popularity during the months of the primary election campaign. He also expressed his rejection of the candidacies of some MSZP politicians in the primary, such as Attila Mesterházy and Csaba Tóth.

Despite his low results in opinion polls, Fekete-Győr announced in August 2021 that he did not to intend to withdraw his candidacy and said that Momentum was "the guarantee of real regime change" after 2022. During the first prime ministerial debate on 12 September, Fekete-Győr argued in favor of the establishment of a National Anticorruption Prosecution Office, which would receive the Carmelite Monastery as its headquarters – the current residence of the Prime Minister's Office. In the second debate (24 September), Fekete-Győr emphasized that Klára Dobrev was less likely to defeat Viktor Orbán because of her husband Ferenc Gyurcsány and their active involvement in pre-2010 politics. During the primary election, Fekete-Győr came in fifth and last place, obtaining 3.4 percent of the vote, while the Momentum Movement won 15 constituencies and received 21.73%; analysts noted that even the majority of the supporters of the party chose different prime ministerial candidates rather than Fekete-Győr. Because of the poor result, Fekete-Győr initiated a vote of confidence regarding his presidency on 5 October. Two days later, Fekete-Győr announced that his party, the Momentum Movement would support Péter Márki-Zay in the second round. The decision contributed to the withdrawal of Gergely Karácsony's candidacy. On 10 October, the majority of the party's assembly of delegates voted against Fekete-Győr during the vote of confidence. Therefore, he resigned as party leader. He said he was grateful for "every meeting, handshake, conversation, feedback he received as party leader on behalf of the community" and he would do his best for the next president, the Momentum Movement, and the success of the opposition coalition.

=== Member of Parliament ===
Although the United for Hungary opposition alliance suffered a catastrophic defeat in the 2022 parliamentary election, Fekete-Győr obtained a mandate via the alliance's national list. He was chosen as leader of the newly formed Momentum parliamentary group. Fekete-Győr announced that MPs of the party would only take the oath, but would then boycott the rest of the inaugural meeting of the 2022–2026 parliament by walking out. Fekete-Győr was replaced as leader of the parliamentary group by the new party president Ferenc Gelencsér in July 2022.

Following the 2024 European Parliament election, where Momentum failed to win a mandate, Fekete-Győr ran for the leadership of the party, but was narrowly defeated by Márton Tompos. In October 2024, Fekete-Győr was convicted in the third instance by the Metropolitan Court for throwing a smoke bomb in front of police officers during a demonstration in 2018. As a result, Fekete-Győr was stripped of his mandate on 25 November 2024, becoming the first member of the national assembly to be expelled in this way since the end of communism. His mandate was taken over by Katalin Cseh.

=== Political commentator ===
In May 2025, Fekete-Győr urged his party not to contest the upcoming 2026 parliamentary election, claiming that it would only result in the dispersion of opposition votes. Since that time, Fekete-Győr was known as a political commentator and the vocal critic of Viktor Orbán's regime, but he also criticized those opposition parties (DK and MKKP) and politicians (for instance, Katalin Cseh), who aimed to contest the election. Finally, the Momentum did not participate in the election, which saw the landslide defeat of Fidesz against Péter Magyar's Tisza Party. Fekete-Győr left Momentum on 18 October 2026, but he intended to remain a non-partisan politician and political commentator.

Party political offices
| Preceded by New office | President of the Momentum Movement; 2016–2021 | Succeeded by Anna Orosz (acting) |
National Assembly of Hungary
| Preceded by New office | Leader of the Momentum parliamentary group 2022 | Succeeded by Ferenc Gelencsér |
