= Tamás Soproni =

Mayor of Terézváros, Budapest, Hungary

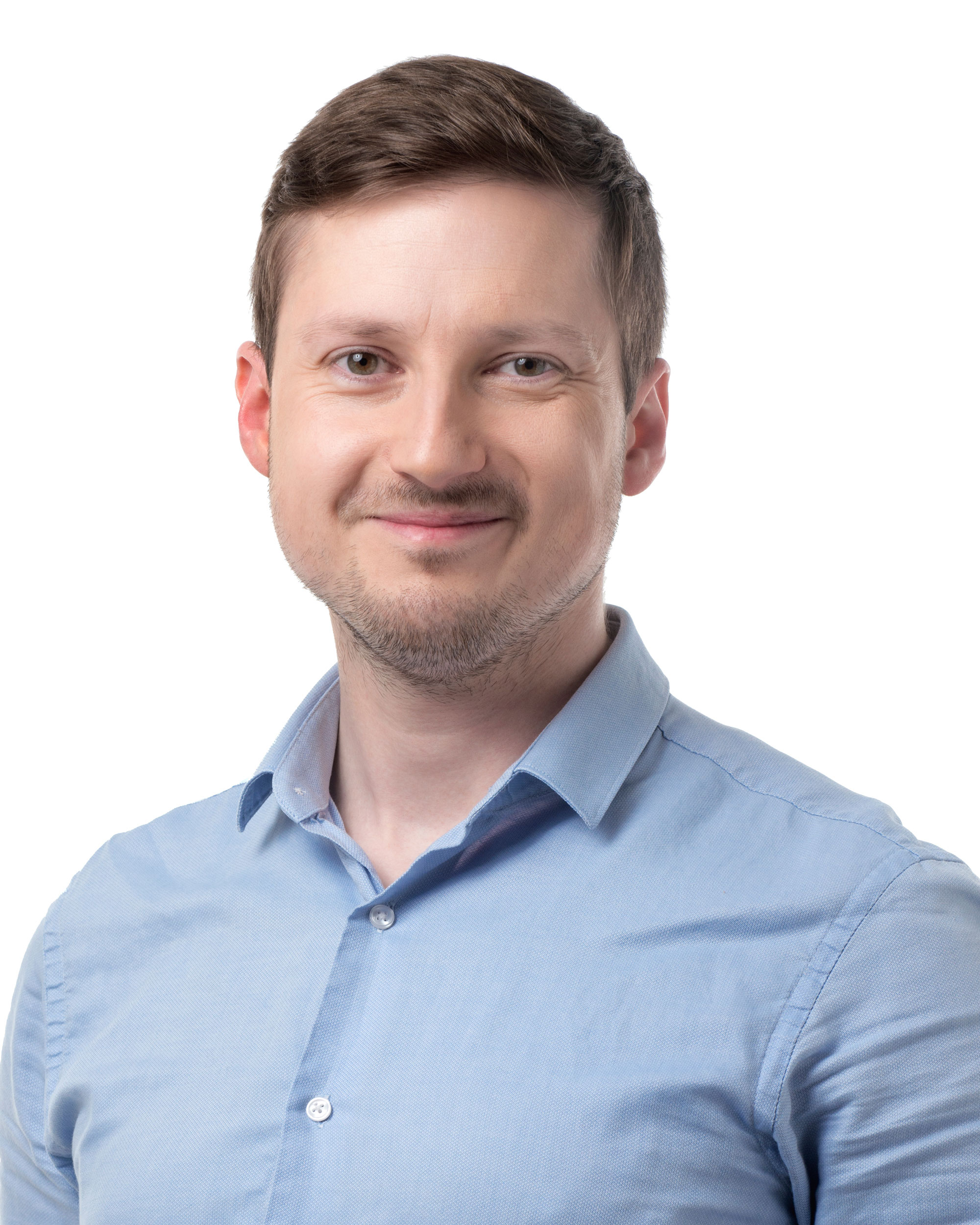

Mayor of Terézváros District VI, Budapest
- Incumbent
- Assumed office 13 October 2019
- Preceded by: Zsófia Hassay

Personal details
- Born: 20 February 1986 (age 40) Budapest, Hungary
- Party: Momentum
- Profession: linguist, translator, politician

Tamás István Soproni (born 20 February 1986) is a Hungarian linguist, translator and politician, who has been the Mayor of Terézváros (6th district of Budapest) since 2019. He is a member of the Momentum Movement.

== Life ==
Soproni was born into a lower-middle-class family in Budapest on 20 February 1986. He has lived in Terézváros since childhood. His father was a sexton and a former supporter of MIÉP. He has three sisters among whom the youngest was adopted. He earned a degree of English studies at the School of English and American Studies of the Faculty of Humanities at Eötvös Loránd University. He served as vice president for foreign affairs in the local student council. He worked as a linguist and translator of literary works prior to him becoming the Mayor of Terézváros. A 2021 profile article on Soproni revealed that he was engaged, and owned a cat named Csinszka.

== Political career ==
Soproni was a joint candidate of the Together, Dialogue for Hungary, Hungarian Socialist Party and Democratic Coalition for a representative seat in Terézváros during the 2014 local elections. He gained 32 percent of the vote and was defeated by Viktor Lindmayer (Fidesz), who received 47%.

Soproni is the founding member of the Momentum Movement, a centrist political association, then party. He was elected its first vice president in March 2017, when the party officially formed. He was responsible for coordination of the activists, also including the so-called NOlimpia campaign, a signature-collection campaign to stop Budapest's bid to host the 2024 Summer Olympics. His confrontational style during interviews at pro-government media portfolios raised his political awareness.. For instance, he interrupted the press conference of government spokesperson István Hollik, who described the Momentum's campaign as part of the work of "Soros network".

News portal Index.hu reported existence of a continuous rivalry behind the scenes for leadership position between Soproni and president of the Momentum, András Fekete-Győr in January 2018. Soproni was charged campaign manager and appeared on third place in the national list of the Momentum Movement, but the party failed to reach the 5% threshold and did not get any seats in the National Assembly during the April 2018 parliamentary election. As a result, the entire presidium, including Soproni resigned. On 9 April 2019, the opposition parties Momentum, Democratic Coalition, Hungarian Socialist Party, Dialogue for Hungary and Politics Can Be Different concluded an electoral alliance for the upcoming 2019 local elections. Accordingly, Tamás Soproni became the five parties' candidate for the position of Mayor of Terézváros. Soproni campaigned for cleanliness of public spaces, increase the size of green space, redevelopment of district parking and the regulation of party tourism in the district. Soproni defeated incumbent mayor Zsófia Hassay (Fidesz) in the election, obtaining 57.49 percent of the vote.
