= 2021 Hungarian opposition primary =

Hungarian opposition primary for the 2022 parliamentary election

2021 Hungarian opposition primary Prime Minister candidates
- 18–28 September 2021 (first round); 10–16 October 2021 (second round)
- Turnout: 633,811 (first round); 662,016 (second round); 853,802 (altogether)
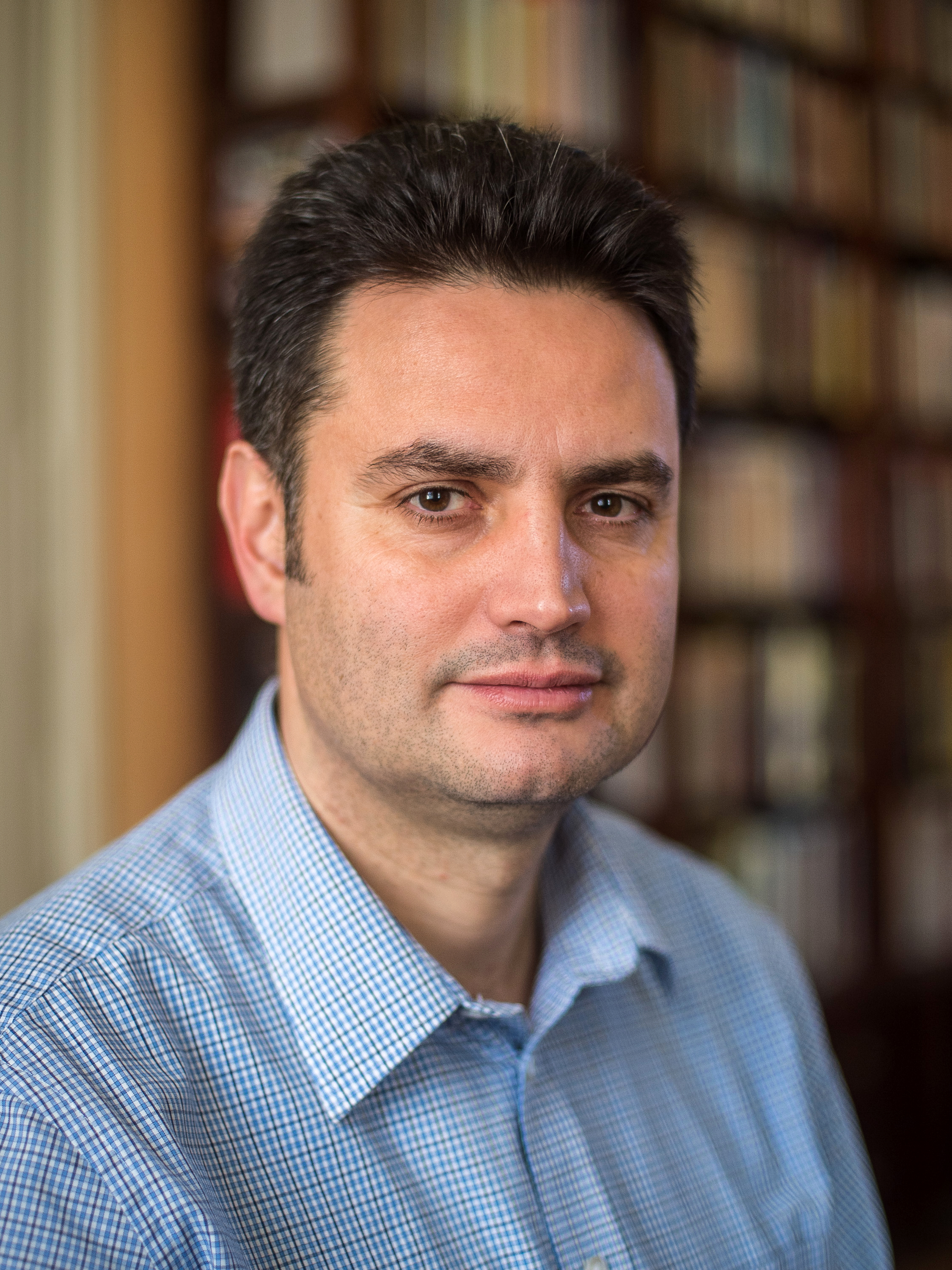

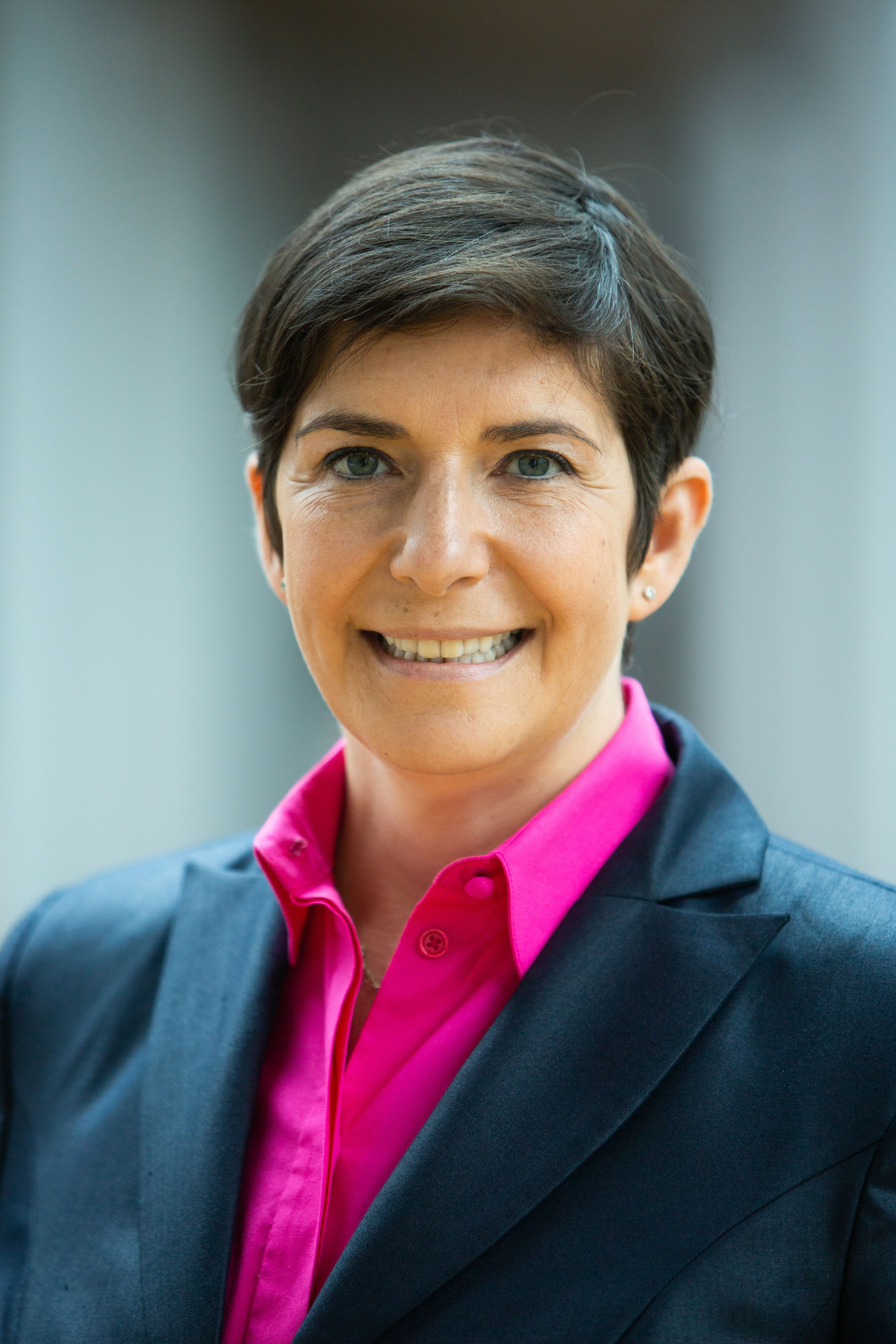
Nominee	Péter Márki-Zay	Klára Dobrev
Party	Independent (Note: Leader of the Everybody's Hungary Movement, which is not a party)	DK–MLP
Popular vote	371,560	283,677
Percentage	56.7%	43.3%

In the run-up to the 2022 Hungarian general election, the parliamentary opposition to the governing Fidesz–KDNP alliance, contesting the election collectively as United for Hungary, held a two-round primary election to select the coalition's prime-ministerial candidate. The first round was held from 18-28 September 2021; the second from 10-16 October 2021. United for Hungary also used the primary to select unity candidates to contest single-member districts. Non-partisan candidate Péter Márki-Zay won the prime-ministerial primary.

== Background ==
The agreement to hold the primary for the prime minister candidate was reached on 15 November 2020 between the Democratic Coalition, Jobbik, LMP – Hungary's Green Party, Momentum Movement, Hungarian Socialist Party, and Dialogue for Hungary. These parties were supported by most opposition voters in the 2018 Hungarian parliamentary election, having received 46.47% of the party list vote. On 20 December 2020, they also agreed on presenting a single party list for the election. A document about the foundations of the common election manifesto was signed by the party leaders on 5 January 2021.

== Electoral process ==
Primaries were to be held for both the prime ministerial candidate and the candidates for the National Assembly in all 106 districts. A prime ministerial candidate had to provide 20,000 signatures in support by 6 September, while a constituency candidate had to provide 400. Independents and candidates of affiliated parties (New World People's Party, Hungarian Liberal Party and New Start) could participate, but they had to sign an agreement with one of the six organizing parties that they would join their parliamentary group if elected.

Constituency candidates were to be selected in a single round of first-past-the-post voting, while the prime ministerial candidate was to be chosen in the second round of voting, to which at most three candidates could qualify. The first round of voting was to be held between 18 and 26 September, and the second between 10 and 16 October, with voting both online and in-person. Any eligible voter, and underage voters who would be 18 years old by the date of the parliamentary election, could vote in the primaries.

== Prime minister candidates ==
=== Candidates (second round) ===
Declared candidates
Candidate	Date of birth	Party	Background	Political views	Reference
Klára Dobrev	2 February 1972 (age 49)	Democratic Coalition–Hungarian Liberal Party	Vice President of the European Parliament (2019–present); MEP on the Democratic Coalition list (2019–present); Wife of former Prime Minister Ferenc Gyurcsány	Social liberalism	
Péter Márki-Zay	9 May 1972 (age 49)	Independent endorsed by New World People's Party in the first round and Momentum Movement in the second round	Mayor of Hódmezővásárhely (2018–present); Leader of the Everybody's Hungary Movement (2018–present)	Liberal conservatism	

=== Withdrawn and eliminated candidates ===
Withdrawn and eliminated candidates
Candidate	Date of birth	Party	Background	Political views	Date of withdrawal	Endorsement	Reference
Gergely Karácsony	11 June 1975 (age 46)	Dialogue for Hungary–Hungarian Socialist Party–LMP – Hungary's Green Party	Co-leader of Dialogue for Hungary (2014–); Mayor of Budapest (2019–present); Former Mayor of Zugló (2014–2019); Former member of the National Assembly (2010–2014); Leader of the 99 Movement (2021)	Green politics Social democracy	8 October 2021	Péter Márki-Zay	
András Fekete-Győr	13 April 1989 (age 32)	Momentum Movement	Leader of Momentum Movement (2017–2021 (Note: Resigned between two rounds))	Centrism; Liberalism	eliminated in the first round	Péter Márki-Zay	
Péter Jakab	16 August 1980 (age 41)	Jobbik	Leader of Jobbik (2020–); Member of the National Assembly (2018–present)	Populism; National conservatism	eliminated in the first round	None	
József Pálinkás	18 September 1952 (age 68)	New World People's Party	President of the Hungarian Academy of Sciences (2008–2014); Minister of Education (2001–2002); Member of the National Assembly (2006–2008); Leader of the New World People's Party (2020–)	Liberal conservatism	could not collect 20,000 signatures	Péter Márki-Zay	
Áron Ecsenyi	12 December 1989 (age 31)	Cut the Taxes by 75% Party	Leader of Cut the Taxes by 75% Party (2019–present)	Economic liberalism Libertarianism	31 August 2021 (Note: Ecsenyi withdrew from candidacy on 31 August 2021 citing the low level of organization of their network of activists, which made it difficult to collect 20,000 signatures)	None	

== Opinion polls ==
=== First round polling ===
Fieldwork date	Polling firm	Sample size	Dobrev	Fekete-Győr	Jakab	Karácsony	Márki-Zay	Others	No answer	Lead
September 2021	Publicus	1198	28	4	12	31	23	2	-	3
September 2021	Publicus	612	30	2	11	31	11	15	-	1
September 2021	PegaPoll	19.500	31	3	31	21	12	-	-	Tie
August 2021	Publicus	1009	29	3	23	34	4	-	-	5
August 2021	Civitas	1001	32	5	23	16	11	11	-	9
July 2021	Pulzus	1000	19	3	14	19	9	-	-	Tie
July 2021	Závecz Research	1200	27	12	28	24	5	-	-	1
June 2021	KutatóCentrum	1000	17	3	47	20	11	-	-	27
June 2021	Medián	1000	26	8	43	41	16	5	-	2
May 2021	Publicus	1011	32	2	15	34	9	-	8	2
May 2021	Civitas	1003	25	6	30	20	7	1	-	5
Apr 2021	Publicus	1012	25	2	19	31	13	-	-	6
Apr 2021	Medián	1000	22	14	40	34	23	-	-	6
Apr 2021	Nézőpont	1000	10	6	21	20	12	22	-	1
Mar 2021	Civitas	1007	17	12	31	26	12	2	-	5
Mar 2021	Závecz Research	1000	28	16	30	16	5	-	5	2
Feb 2021	IDEA	2000	30	8	29	24	9	-	-	1
Feb 2021	Medián	1000	25	10	32	39	22	-	-	14
Jan 2021	Pulzus	1000	19	11	16	19	15	8	-	Tie
Dec 2020	Századvég	1000	32	7	17	20	24	-	-	8

=== Second round polling ===
Fieldwork date	Polling firm	Sample size	Dobrev	Karácsony	Márki-Zay	Others	No answer	Lead
October 2021	PegaPoll	5,000	42.6	57.4	-	-	-	14.8
October 2021	PegaPoll	5,000	37.7	-	62.3	-	-	24.6
October 2021	PegaPoll	5,000	30.5	30.5	39.0	-	-	8.5
29 Sep - 4 Oct 2021	Medián	1,000	37	24	33	-	6	4

== Debates ==
2021 Hungarian opposition primary debates
Date	Broadcasters	P Present S Surrogate I Invited NI Not invited A Absent N No debate				
Date	Broadcasters	Dobrev	Fekete-Győr	Jakab	Karácsony	Márki-Zay
12 September	ATV	P	P	P	P	P
18 September	Partizán / 444.hu	N				
24 September	RTL Klub	P	P	P	P	P
13 October	RTL Klub	P (Note: For candidates getting to the second round)	NI	NI	A (Note: Got to the second round but later withdrawn)	P

== Endorsements ==
Klára Dobrev

Before first round

- Lajos Balázsovits, actor
- Ferenc Gyurcsány, former Prime Minister of Hungary (2004–2009) (Dobrev's husband)
- Gábor Kuncze, former Minister of the Interior (1994–1998), chairman of the Hungarian Alliance of Free Democrats (1997–1998, 2001–2007) and television host
- Péter Oszkó, former Minister of Finance (2009–2010)

After first round

- Richárd Barabás, deputy mayor of Újbuda, Dialogue politician
- Gábor Demszky, former Mayor of Budapest (1990–2010) and SZDSZ politician
- Gábor Erőss, deputy mayor of Józsefváros, Dialogue politician
- Zsolt Fekete, mayor of Salgótarján, MSZP politician
- Iván Fischer, conductor and composer
- Péter Gajda, mayor of Kispest, MSZP politician
- Zoltán Gőgös, MSZP politician and former MP
- Kinga Göncz, former Minister of Foreign Affairs (2006–2009)
- István Hiller, former Minister of Education (2006–2010), MSZP politician
- Csaba Horváth, mayor of Zugló, MSZP politician
- György Ipkovich, former mayor of Szombathely, MSZP politician
- Ferenc Juhász, former Minister of Defence (2002–2006), MSZP politician
- András Nemény, mayor of Szombathely, MSZP politician
- Péter Szitka, mayor of Kazincbarcika, MSZP politician
- László Teleki, MSZP politician of Romani ethnicity, former MP
- Kata Tisza, writer
- Mária Vásárhelyi, sociologist and academic

Foreign support

- Marc Angel, Luxembourgish MEP (S&D).
- Paolo De Castro, Italian MEP (S&D) and former Minister of Agriculture (1998–2000, 2006–2008).
- Jonás Fernández, Spanish MEP (S&D).
- Iratxe García, leader of the Progressive Alliance of Socialists and Democrats (S&D)
- Evelyne Gebhardt, German MEP (S&D).
- Tarja Halonen, former President of Finland (2000–2012).
- Agnes Jongerius, Dutch MEP (S&D).
- Dan Nica, Romanian MEP (S&D).
- Tsvetelina Penkova, Bulgarian MEP (S&D).
- Manuel Pizarro, Portuguese MEP (S&D).
- Birgit Sippel, German MEP (S&D).
- Paul Tang, Dutch MEP (S&D).
Gergely Karácsony

Before first round

- Róbert Alföldi, actor, stage director and television host
- Gordon Bajnai, former Prime Minister of Hungary (2009–2010)
- Péter Ákos Bod, former Minister of Industry and Trade (1990–1991) and Governor of the Hungarian National Bank (1991–1994)
- András Hajós, singer, songwriter, television host and comedian
- Andrea Osvárt, actress, film producer and former fashion model
- Béla Tarr, film director and producer
Péter Márki-Zay

Before first round

- János Bródy, pop singer-songwriter, guitarist, composer and scriptwriter
- Ferenc Kőszeg, democratic opposition activist during the Communist regime, former MP and SZDSZ politician
- József Pálinkás, leader of New World People's Party, former candidate
- Géza Jeszenszky, former Minister of Foreign Affairs (1990–1994), Hungarian Ambassador Extraordinary and Plenipotentiary in the United States (1998–2002)

After first round

- Péter Ákos Bod, former Minister of Industry and Trade (1990–1991) and Governor of the Hungarian National Bank (1991–1994)
- László Botka, mayor of Szeged, former MSZP politician
- Lóránt Budai, mayor of Jászberény, Jobbik politician
- András Fekete-Győr, leader of Momentum Movement, former candidate
- Imre Forgács, former Minister of Justice (2009–2010).
- György Gémesi, mayor of Gödöllő, President of the Alliance of Hungarian Local-Governments
- Zita Gurmai, MSZP politician and former MEP
- Ákos Hadházy, independent MP and former co-leader of LMP
- Miklós Haraszti, former OSCE Representative on Freedom of the Media (2004–2010), former MP and SZDSZ politician
- Henrik Havas, journalist, radio and television presenter, former government spokesman
- Péter Hegedüs, mayor of Balmazújváros
- Károly Herényi, former leader of the MDF parliamentary group
- Péter Juhász, political activist, former leader of Together
- Gergely Karácsony, co-leader of Dialogue for Hungary, Mayor of Budapest, former candidate
- János Kendernay, diplomat, former co-leader of LMP
- László Lóránt Keresztes, leader of the LMP parliamentary group
- Ildikó Lendvai, former MSZP chairperson and leader of its parliamentary group
- Ilona Matkovich, mayor of Vác
- András Nagy Bandó, comedian
- Róbert Puzsér, publicist, anchorman, and social critic
- Géza Röhrig, actor and poet
- Tímea Szabó, co-leader of Dialogue for Hungary and MP
- Bernadett Szél, independent MP and former co-leader of LMP
- Bertalan Tóth, co-leader of MSZP
- István Ujhelyi, MSZP politician and MEP
- Klára Ungár, former Fidesz and SZDSZ politician, first LGBT member of the National Assembly
- Krisztián Ungváry, historian and academic
- Rudolf Ungváry, essayist and journalist
- Gábor Vágó, LMP politician and former MP
- Tamás Wittinghoff, mayor of Budaörs

== Constituencies ==
265 candidates have officially registered until the 15 August deadline to run in one of the 106 constituencies. In 11 districts, only one candidate has registered, while the highest number of competitors was 5, which happened in three places. 258 of them has managed to submit the required 400 signatures until 6 September.

=== Breakdown of candidates by selected parliamentary group ===
Number of candidates by selected parliamentary group (Note: A party does not necessarily support all independent candidates it accepted to its parliamentary group, in some cases, they support the candidate of another party instead)
Party	Candidate	Endorsed	All
DK	61	28	89
Jobbik	55	30	85
LMP	25	48	73
MMM	– (Note: A political movement that could not thus run candidates under its own banner)	90	90
Momentum	61	15	76
MSZP	38	55	93
Dialogue	12	57	69
ÚVNP	16 (Note: All ÚVNP candidates had to declare a secondary affiliation, in case the party cannot establish a parliamentary group. 8 of them selected LMP, 3 Jobbik, 2-2 each Momentum and DK, and 1 Dialogue)	49	65
Liberals	– (Note: A minor political party, 2 politicians ran as candidates under DK banner)	54	54
ÚK	– (Note: A minor political party, 2 politicians ran as candidates under each LMP and Momentum banner)	32	32
Independent	9	–	9

== Party list ==
On 20 December 2020, all six parties agreed on presenting a single party list for the election. The primary election does not directly affect the composition of this list.

== Results ==
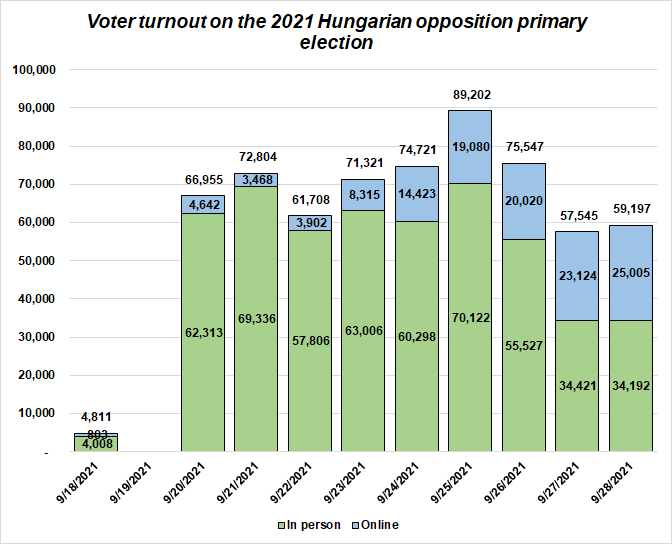
Voter turnout on the 2021 Hungarian opposition primary election

=== First round ===
Turnout
	18 Sept	20 Sept	21 Sept	22 Sept	23 Sept	24 Sept	25 Sept	26 Sept	27 Sept	28 Sept	Overall
In-person	4,008	62,313	69,336	57,806	63,006	60,298	70,122	55,527	34,421	34,192	511,029
Online	803	4,642	3,468	3,902	8,315	14,423	19,080	20,020	23,124	25,005	122,782
Sum	4,811	66,955	72,804	61,708	71,321	74,721	89,202	75,547	57,545	59,197	633,811

==== Prime Minister candidates ====
Prime minister candidate	Party	In-person	Online	Total	%
Klára Dobrev	Democratic Coalition–Hungarian Liberal Party	196,572	19,676	216,248	34.84%
Gergely Karácsony	Dialogue for Hungary–Hungarian Socialist Party–LMP – Hungary's Green Party	128,123	41,311	169,434	27.30%
Péter Márki-Zay	Independent	87,569	39,059	126,628	20.40%
Péter Jakab	Jobbik	71,230	16,148	87,378	14.08%
András Fekete-Győr	Momentum Movement	14,393	6,657	21,050	3.39%
Total		497,887	122,851	620,738	100.00%
Valid votes				620,738	97.94%
Invalid/blank votes				13,073	2.06%
Total				633,811	100.00%
Source: National Primary Election Office

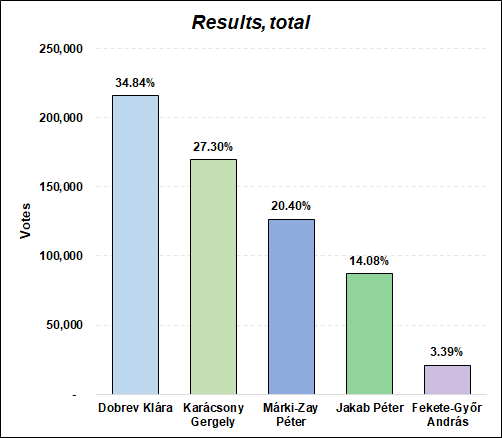
Results, total

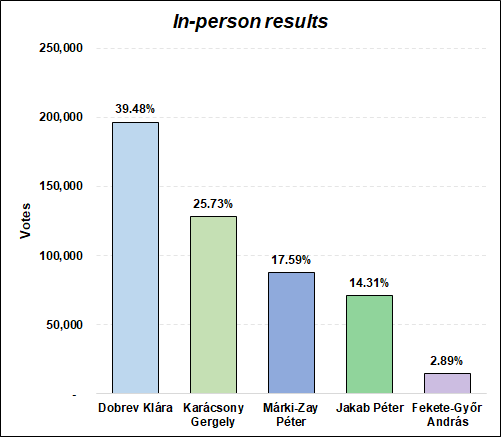
In-person results

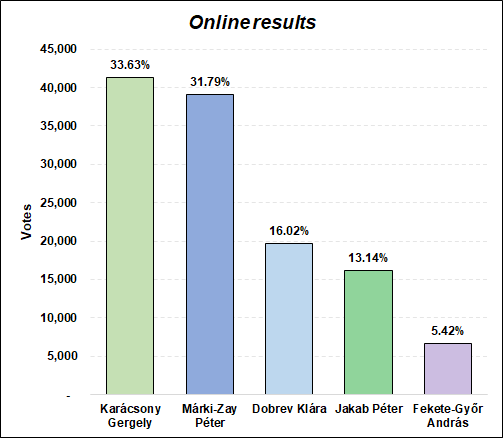
Online results

==== Constituencies ====
Winning party candidates in each single-member constituency.

Party	Votes	%	Constituency
Democratic Coalition	163,387	26.96%	32
Jobbik	127,396	21.02%	29
Hungarian Socialist Party	95,574	15.77%	18
Momentum Movement	131,729	21.73%	15
Dialogue for Hungary	39,006	6.44%	6
LMP – Hungary's Green Party	31,503	5.20%	5
Everybody's Hungary Movement	17,498	2.89%	1
Total	606,093	100%	106
Valid votes	606,093	95.63%	
Invalid/blank votes	27,718	4.37%	
Total	633,811	100.00%	
Source: National Primary Election Office

=== Events between the two rounds ===
Klára Dobrev and her party, Democratic Coalition (DK), won the first round with a convincing advantage, obtaining 34.84% and 32 constituencies, respectively. Out of 106 constituences, Dobrev took first place in the prime-ministerial primary in 85; she won by large margins in the countryside, while results in Budapest were more balanced. Despite entering the race as the favorite, Gergely Karácsony came in second place (27.3%) and won few rural constituencies; in Budapest, where he had been elected Lord Mayor in 2019, he fared much better. Overall, he won 15 constituencies. In a major upset, independent candidate Péter Márki-Zay came in the third place (20.4%), qualifying for the second round. Péter Jakab of Jobbik and András Fekete-Győr of Momentum, both established parties, were eliminated.

After preliminary results became available on 29 September, Márki-Zay began negotiating with Karácsony about one of them possibly withdrawing in favor of the other. Márki-Zay argued that Dobrev—as the wife of former prime minister Ferenc Gyurcsány, a highly polarizing political figure—would be incapable of defeating incumbent prime minister Viktor Orbán in the general election. Márki-Zay said he would withdraw in favor of Karácsony if the latter incorporated the adoption of the Euro, accountability for the Fidesz government, and the repeal of Hungary's Fundamental Law into his platform. The same day, Karácsony stated in an interview on the Partizán political podcast that although he would not withdraw, he would appoint Márki-Zay deputy prime minister in his prospective government. Karácsony also doubted that his urban, liberal base could support the more conservative Márki-Zay but agreed with his assessment that Dobrev could not defeat Orbán. Márki-Zay countered that he believed the majority of Jobbik and Momentum voters, whose candidates had been eliminated in the first round, would support his candidacy in the second. He also pointed out that, despite spending orders of magnitude less money than Karácsony, he had achieved "almost the same [first-round] result."

DK politicians, including Gyurcsány, criticized the tactical talks between Márki-Zay and Karácsony and argued it was the electorate's role to decide which candidate was most capable of defeating Orbán. Dobrev said she was not concerning herself with Márki-Zay and Karácsony's debate, stating that "the change of government will depend on whether we will be able to shake up the whole country, as it is not possible to change government only from Budapest. I am working on this right now." Jakab also opposed the negotiations between Karácsony and Márki-Zay, stating he could only support them if the two candidates came together to increase the number of opposition voters. "But if the two of you get together so that the third doesn't win, only wounds will come of it," he added.

On 1 October, Márki-Zay and Karácsony announced they would campaign together and that, in their future government, one would serve as prime minister, the other as deputy prime minister. They pledged, however, that one of them would withdraw in favor of the other later in the campaign once one of them convinced the other of being the superior candidate. At a rally on 3 October, Karácsony stated, "I can replace Viktor Orbán. Therefore, I do not step back, but forward" and called himself the "common ground" within the opposition. During an interview at the same event, he added that he would only step back if "hit by a tram". At a parallel rally, Márki-Zay said he believed he was the one who could address most people, but that if Karácsony made a vanity question out of the candidacy, he would not be involved in "this chicken game" and would "pull the steering wheel aside."

On 4 October, Karácsonyi visited Márki-Zay in Hódmezővásárhely, where they confirmed their intention to run in the second round together and asked the National Primary Election Office (OEVB) to print their names side-by-side on the ballot. They added they would establish a joint platform and would continue to make all decisions via consensus once in government. The OEVB, however, did not permit their names to appear side-by-side. György Magyar, the chairman of the Civil Election Commission, stated that the appearance of a two-person candidate on the ballot would be "surreal" and that accepted election rules could not be changed retrospectively. Dobrev described Márki-Zay and Karácsony's proposal as "confusing." Márki-Zay blamed the "DK–Jobbik coalition" for this development and added that while "Dobrev's success is unquestionable...the catastrophic results before 2010, which gave Fidesz a two-thirds [parliamentary majority] at the time, and the many billions the ruling party [has] spent on negative campaigning against Gyurcsány, make Klára Dobrev the least suitable candidate against Viktor Orbán."

On 5–7 October, several polls were published, yielding different results. According to a survey by Publicus and Republikon, Karácsony was more likely to defeat Dobrev in the second round, while Závecz and Medián's polling showed Márki-Zay did. Consequently, Márki-Zay stated that "the numbers say very clearly that I am not the one who has to step back". Within hours, Karácsony called a press conference and reiterated that he would not withdraw his nomination. He stated that he would represent the platform of his own party and the parties supporting it, as this platform was the only one capable of guaranteeing "social reconciliation for Hungary." Márki-Zay responded that "the tram has arrived" and that Karácsony had no chance of defeating Dobrev in the primary and thus defeating Orbán in the general. Negotiations between them that afternoon proved fruitless, and Karácsony said that as neither would step back in favor of the other, three names would remain on the ballot.

On 7 October, Fekete-Győr announced that Momentum would support Márki-Zay in the second round. The party's vice-chairperson, Anna Orosz, argued that they were doing so because of an obligation to support the "most honest candidate" and one who could address both undecided voters and voters from both sides of the political spectrum. On 8 October, Márki-Zay and Karácsony called a joint press conference in Kossuth Square. There, Karácsony announced he would withdraw in favor of Márki-Zay, stating that "I came to the insight yesterday that if I do not do this, Viktor Orbán will remain in power." Márki-Zay responded that Karácsony "proved that the interest of the homeland is what is most important to him" and called him a "statesman."

Despite Karácsony's decision, the parties supporting him—MSZP, Dialogue and LMP—did not express their support for Márki-Zay. Jobbik also remained neutral. MSZP, Dialogue, and LMP said, however, that they would support the primary's winner—whether Dobrev or Márki-Zay—in the general. A minor political party, New Start, declared its support for Márki-Zay, as did the minor Social Democratic Party. On 14 October, two days before the second round and abandoning its formerly neutral position, the presidium of MSZP called for support for Márki-Zay despite many prominent members' previous endorsements of Dobrev.

=== Second round ===
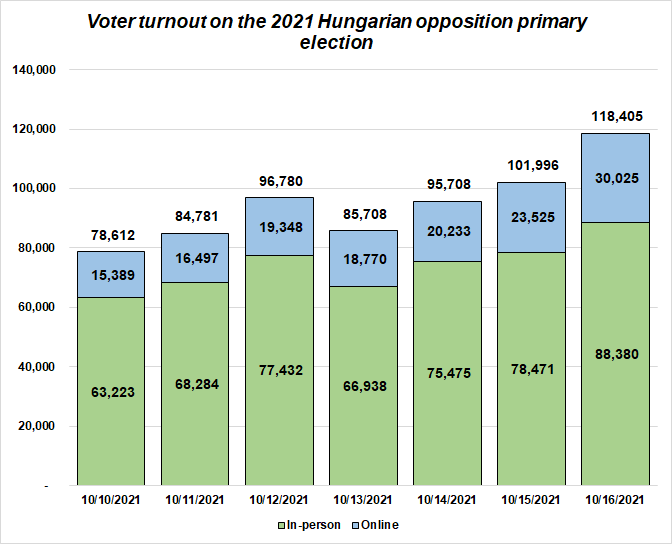
Voter turnout on the 2021 Hungarian opposition primary election, second round

Turnout
	10 Oct	11 Oct	12 Oct	13 Oct	14 Oct	15 Oct	16 Oct	Overall
In-person	63,223	68,284	77,432	66,938	75,475	78,471	88,380	518,203
Online	15,389	16,497	19,348	18,770	20,233	23,525	30,035	143,797
Sum	78,612	84,781	96,780	85,708	95,708	101,996	118,415	662,016

219,991 electors, who voted in the second round, previously did not go to the polls in the first round. Consequently, altogether 853,802 electors had participated in the opposition primary (either in one or the other, or both rounds). 442,025 voters participated in both rounds, while 191,786 people voted only in the first round.

Prime minister candidate	Party	In-person	Online	Total	%
Péter Márki-Zay	Independent	259,736	111,824	371,560	56.71%
Klára Dobrev	Democratic Coalition–Hungarian Liberal Party	251,758	31,919	283,677	43.29%
Gergely Karácsony	Dialogue for Hungary–Hungarian Socialist Party–LMP – Hungary's Green Party	Withdrawn			
Total		511,494	143,743	655,237	100.00%
Valid votes		655,237			98.66%
Invalid/blank votes		8,892			1.34%
Total		664,129			100.00%
Source: National Primary Election Office
