= Gelencsér =

Gelencsér is a surname. Notable people with the surname include:

- Attila Gelencsér (born 1968), Hungarian politician
- Ferenc Gelencsér (born 1990), Hungarian politician
- Imre Gelencsér (born 1960), Hungarian judoka
