= Anna Donáth =

Hungarian politician (born 1987)

Anna Donáth MEP
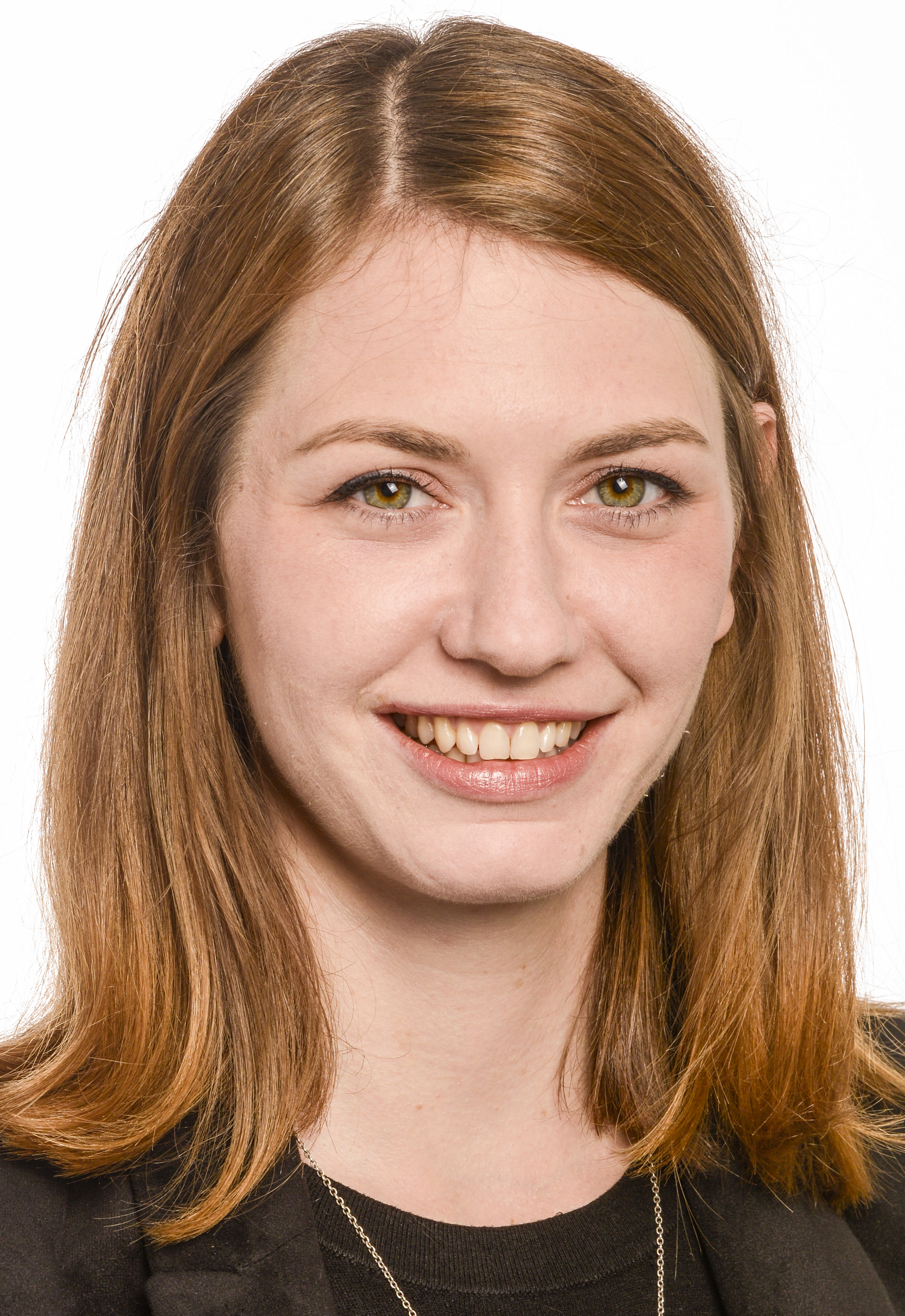

Member of the European Parliament
- In office 2 July 2019 – 15 July 2024
- Constituency: Hungary

Leader of Momentum Movement
- In office 28 January 2024 – 7 July 2024
- Preceded by: Ferenc Gelencsér
- Succeeded by: Márton Tompos
- In office 21 November 2021 – 29 May 2022
- Preceded by: Anna Orosz (interim)
- Succeeded by: Ferenc Gelencsér

Personal details
- Born: 6 April 1987 (age 39) Budapest, Hungary
- Party: Momentum (since 2016)
- Children: 1
- Education: Eötvös Loránd University; University of Amsterdam
- Website: donathanna.hu

Anna Júlia Donáth (born 6 April 1987) is a Hungarian politician. She was elected as a Momentum Movement (part of the Renew Europe group) Member of the European Parliament (MEP) in the 2019 European Parliament election. Donáth was the leader of the party between 21 November 2021 and 29 May 2022, and also from 28 January to 7 July 2024.

== Early life and career ==
Donáth was born on 6 April 1987 in Budapest, Hungary, to László Donáth and Ildikó Muntag. She is the youngest of three siblings. Her father is a former pastor and former member of parliament for the Hungarian Socialist Party. Her paternal grandfather, Ferenc Donáth, is of Jewish descent, and was a lawyer and one of the three secretaries of the Central Committee of the Hungarian Socialist Workers' Party during the Hungarian Revolution of 1956.

Donáth's early education was at Veres Péter High School in Békásmegyer, Budapest. She studied sociology at the Eötvös Loránd University in Budapest and migration and ethnic studies at the University of Amsterdam. After graduating, she completed an internship at the European Commission, before returning to Hungary to become a project manager for the non-governmental organization (NGO), Menedék. She joined the Momentum Movement in 2016, and became its vice president in June 2018. Donáth was a candidate for the centrist party in the 2018 Hungarian parliamentary election. The party did not win any seats in the election.

In December 2018, Donáth participated in a protest against the Hungarian government's new labour law dubbed by opponents as "the slave law", which raised the overtime yearly cap for workers from 250 to 400 hours, and allowed businesses three years instead of one year to pay for the overtime. Donáth was arrested at the protest, and later released.

== European Parliament ==
Donáth stood as a candidate for Momentum Movement in the 2019 European Parliament election in Hungary. She was second on her party's list, and was elected as one of its two MEPs (the other being Katalin Cseh) in Hungary. She represents the third generation of her family to enter political office (after her father and her paternal grandfather). In the European Parliament, Donáth is a member of the Renew Europe party group. She serves on the Committee on Civil Liberties, Justice and Home Affairs. In this capacity, she is also member of the Democracy, Rule of Law & Fundamental Rights Monitoring Group. In 2022, she joined the Committee of Inquiry to investigate the use of Pegasus and equivalent surveillance spyware. In addition to her committee assignments, Donáth is part of the parliament's delegation to the European Union–Albania Stabilisation and Association Parliamentary Committee, the European Parliament Intergroup on Freedom of Religion or Belief and Religious Tolerance, and the European Parliament Intergroup on LGBT Rights.

After becoming an MEP, Donáth gained immunity from prosecution for her participation in the December 2018 labour law protest, however Donáth chose to waive it on 29 May 2019. Donáth was elected leader of the Momentum Movement on 21 November 2021. She acquired 56.6 percent of the vote, defeating Anna Orosz (28.9%) and Gábor Hollai (14.5%). Following the 2022 Hungarian parliamentary election, where the opposition alliance United for Hungary, including Momentum, suffered a heavy defeat, Donáth announced on 9 May 2022 that she was pregnant and would not stand for the party's renewal election. She was succeeded by Ferenc Gelencsér.

Donáth returned to the Hungarian politics as leader of Momentum in January 2024. Under her leadership, the party wanted to develop an independent political image from the other opposition parties. Donáth refused to join DK–MSZP–Dialogue Alliance and ran independently the 2024 European Parliament election and 2024 Budapest Assembly election too. Ahead of the 2024 European Parliament election in Hungary, which would hold its six-month European Union presidency from July 2024, she was considered among the MEPs to watch and described as one of "the most prominent Orbán opposers in the Parliament". However, Momentum failed to win mandates in both EP and Budapest municipal elections too (thus Donáth also lost her seat in the European Parliament), therefore Donáth and the entire leadership of Momentum resigned on 10 June 2024.

== Recognition ==
In December 2020, Donáth received an award at The Parliament Magazine's annual MEP Awards for best use of Social Media.

Party political offices
Preceded by Anna Orosz (acting)	President of the Momentum Movement; 2021–2022	Succeeded by Ferenc Gelencsér
Preceded by Ferenc Gelencsér	President of the Momentum Movement; 2024	Succeeded by Márton Tompos
