= Ferenc Gelencsér =

Hungarian politician

Leader of Momentum Movement
- In office 29 May 2022 – 28 January 2024
- Preceded by: Anna Donáth
- Succeeded by: Anna Donáth

Member of the National Assembly
- In office 2 May 2022 – 8 May 2026

Personal details
- Born: 21 July 1990 (age 35) Székesfehérvár, Hungary
- Party: Momentum Movement

Ferenc József Gelencsér (21 July 1990) is a Hungarian politician, member of the National Assembly, and leader of the Momentum Movement party from 2022 to 2024.

== Career ==
Gelencsér comes from a conservative family with classic right-wing values. His father was a founding member of the Hungarian Democratic Forum.

He graduated in International Studies from Eötvös Loránd University. In 2013, he spent some time in India working for a foundation that helps Tibetan refugees. From 2018 to 2019 he worked as a sales assistant at Di Verdi Hotel Kft. and in 2019 as a financial analyst at Eaton Hungary Kft.

In 2016, he co-founded the Momentum Movement and became the president of the party's 1st district branch.

In the 2019 local elections, Ferenc Gelencsér won a mandate of the Budapest I. district No. 5 single mandate constituency as a joint candidate of United for Hungary.

He ran unsuccessfully in the 2021 opposition primary as a challenger to LMP politician Antal Csárdi in Budapest's parliamentary constituency No. 1. However, he was placed 26th on the joint opposition list as the third name of his party.

In the 2022 parliamentary election, Gelencsér was elected to parliament from the opposition joint list. The Momentum faction elected him deputy leader. He wanted to be a member of two parliamentary committees, the Foreign Affairs and Defence Committees, but was rejected by House Speaker László Kövér, without giving reasons.

Anna Donáth, who had been Momentum's leader since November 2021, announced on 9 May 2022 that she was pregnant, and would not stand for the party's renewal election. Ferenc Gelencsér then announced on 23 May that he would become the party's leader. In addition to him, Miklós Hajnal and Gábor Kerpel-Fronius also entered the race. At the 29 May election, the delegates finally elected Gelencsér. The new party president promised that instead of "aimless Orbán-hate" he would seek to communicate Momentum's ideas on how to solve the country's problems to the electorate. He was elected leader of the Momentum parliamentary group in July 2022.

Under his leadership, the party was more likely to notice itself with PR actions, while it was unable to achieve an increase in popularity. For instance, Gelencsér and other MPs dismantled the cordon around the Carmelite Monastery of Buda (Orbán's residence) and they did other spectacular actions that did not thematize the public discourse. According to the critics, Gelencsér also personally performed poorly on several occasions in relation to his political opponents.

Gelencsér resigned as president of Momentum on 20 December 2023. He was succeeded by Anna Donáth in January 2024. Gelencsér was replaced as leader of the parliamentary group too on 26 February 2024, when he was succeeded by Dávid Bedő.

Party political offices
Preceded by Anna Donáth	President of the Momentum Movement; 2022–2024	Succeeded by Anna Donáth
National Assembly of Hungary
Preceded by András Fekete-Győr	Leader of the Momentum parliamentary group 2022–2024	Succeeded by Dávid Bedő
