= Terézváros =

District of Budapest in Central Hungary

6th District of Budapest Budapest VI. kerülete Terézváros
- District of Budapest
- District VI
- Flag Coat of arms

- Location of District VI in Budapest (shown in grey)
- Coordinates: 47°30′35″N 19°04′11″E
- Country: Hungary
- Region: Central Hungary
- City: Budapest
- Established: 17 November 1873
- Quarters: List: Terézváros

Government
  - Mayor: Tamás Soproni (Momentum Movement)
  - Deputy Mayor: Máté Győrffy (Momentum) Jun Miyazaki (Democratic Coalition); Szilvia Temesvári (Dialogue) Zsuzsanna Beleznay (Jobbik)

Area
  - Total: 2.38 km^{2} (0.92 sq mi)
  - Rank: 22nd

Population (2016)
  - Total: 38,504
  - Rank: 20th
  - Density: 16,200/km^{2} (41,900/sq mi)
- Demonym: hatodik kerületi ("6th districter")
- Time zone: UTC+1 (CET)
  - Summer (DST): UTC+2 (CEST)
- Postal code: 1061 ... 1068
- Website: www.terezvaros.hu

Terézváros (Hungarian pronunciation: [ˈtɛreːzvaːroʃ], 'Theresa Town', German: Theresienstadt) is the District VI of Budapest, and was named after Queen Maria Theresa in 1777, who visited the neighbourhood 26 years earlier in 1751. The territory was first inhabited in the early 18th century when the old town of Pest (today: Inner City) was already fully built, so that people had to inhabit lands outside the city. Terézváros was one of the ten districts that were formed when the city of Budapest was created in 1873.
Today Terézváros is the second in population density after the neighbouring Erzsébetváros. Terézváros is meanwhile the second smallest district (also the first being Erzsébetváros). Both districts are famous for their night life.

== Location ==
Terézváros is located in the Pest side of Budapest.

Neighbours of District VI are (clockwise from north):

- District XIII
- District XIV: Zugló
- District VII: Erzsébetváros ("Elizabeth Town"), known of the historical Jewish quarter
- District V: Belváros-Lipótváros ("Inner City – Leopold Town")

== Landmarks ==
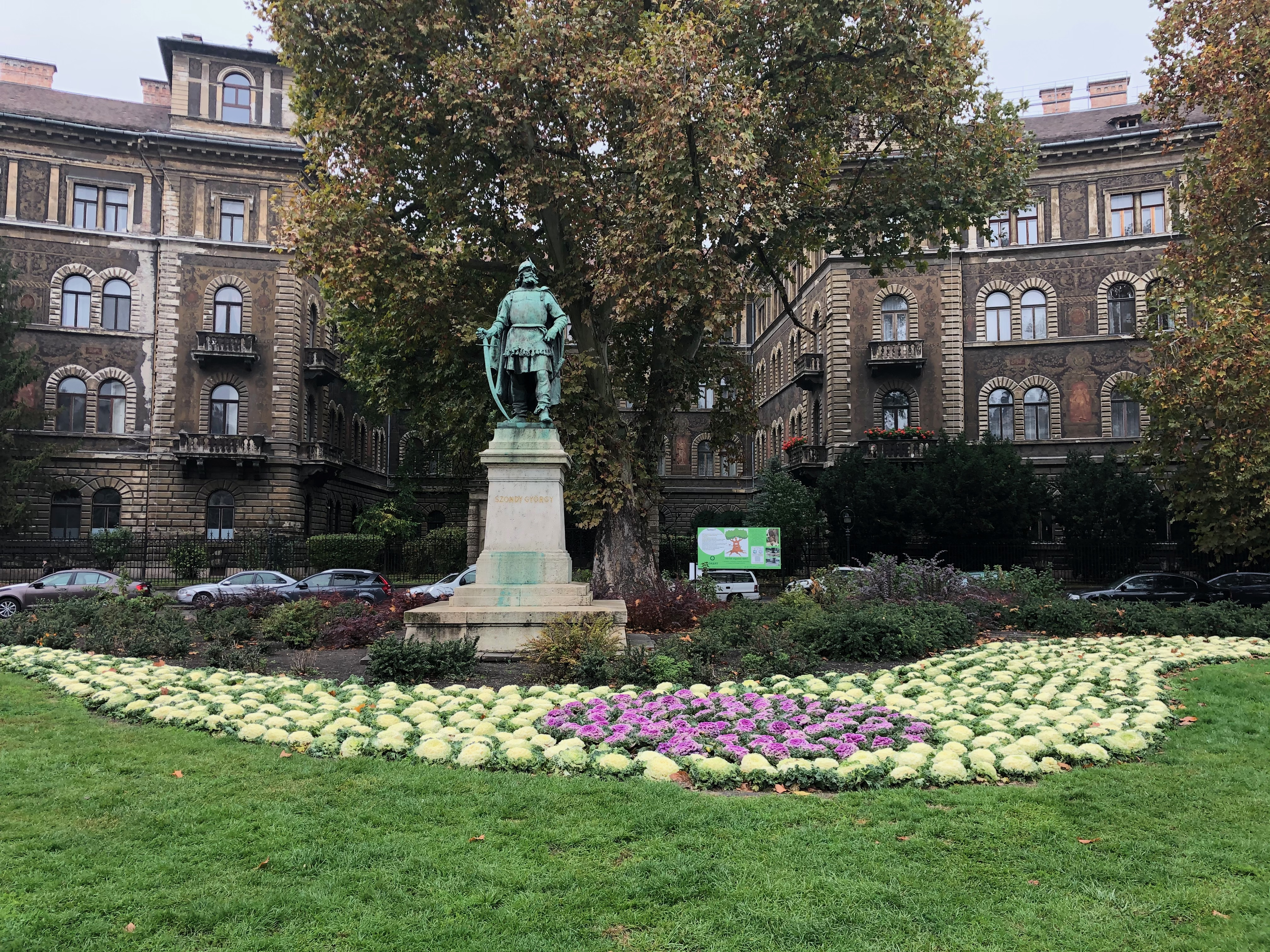
Kodály Körönd square

- Andrássy Avenue
- Millennium Underground Railway
- Hungarian State Opera House
- Franz Liszt Academy of Music
- House of Terror Museum

== Politics ==
The current mayor of VI. District of Budapest is Tamás Soproni (Momentum).

The District Assembly, elected at the 2019 local government elections, is made up of 15 members (1 Mayor, 10 Individual constituencies MEPs and 4 Compensation List MEPs) divided into this political parties and alliances:

Party	Seats	Current District Assembly
Opposition coalition (Note: Coalition of Momentum–DK–MSZP–Dialogue–LMP.)	11	M
Fidesz-KDNP	4	

=== List of mayors ===
Member	Party	Date
Tibor Seiler	SZDSZ	1990–1994
György Borsány	MSZP	1994–1998
György Farkas	Fidesz	1998–2002
István Verók	MSZP	2002–2010
Zsófia Hassay	Fidesz	2010–2019
Tamás Soproni	Momentum	2019–

== Twin towns ==
Terézváros is twinned with:

- (Hungary) Lenti, Zala County
- Târgu Secuiesc, Romania
- Temerin, Serbia
- Zadar, Croatia
- Drezda, Germany

== See also ==
- List of districts in Budapest
