= Sándor Rónai (politician, born 1988) =

Hungarian politician and MEP for Hungary

Sándor Rónai MEP
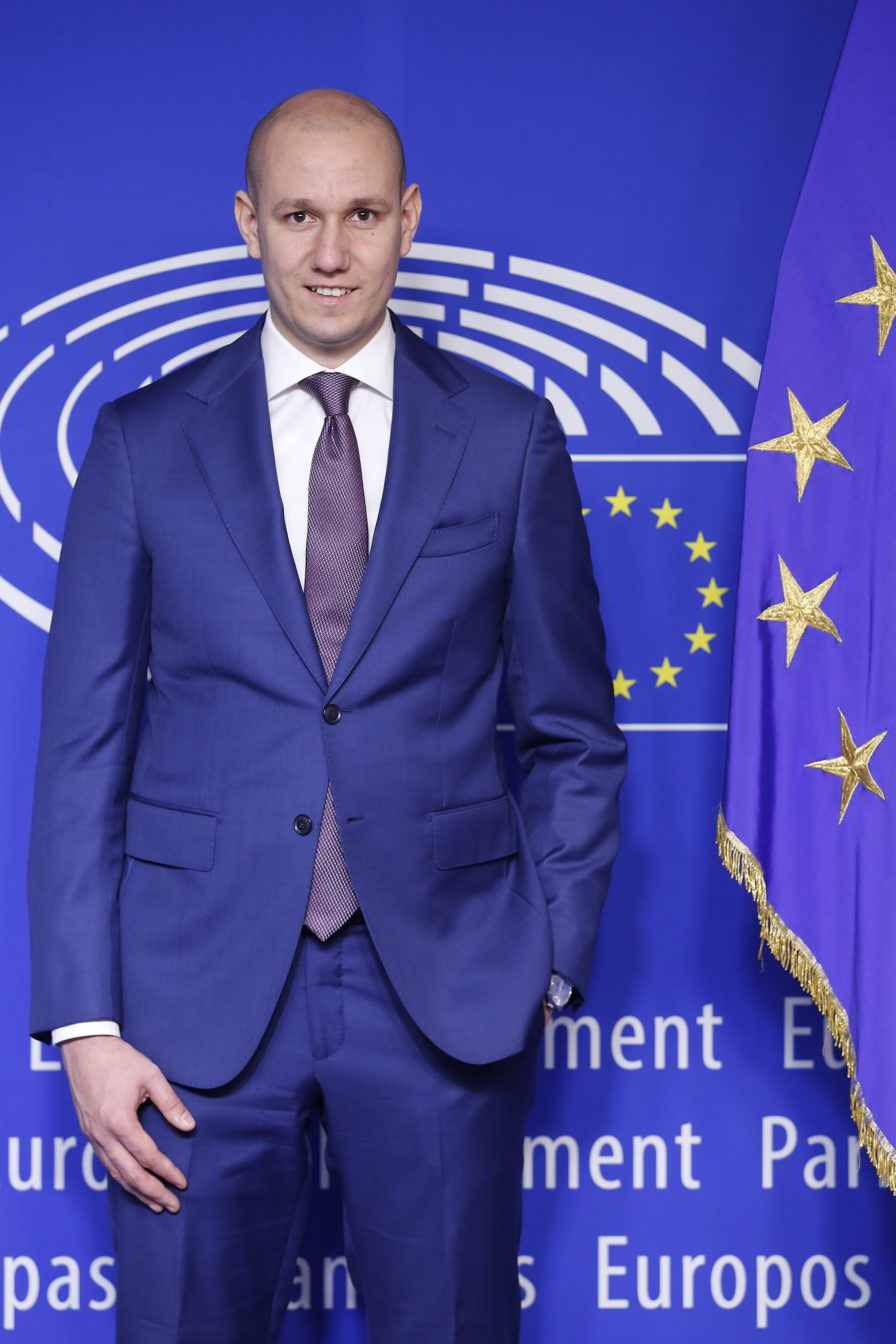

Member of the National Assembly
- In office 19 May 2025 – 9 May 2026

Member of the European Parliament
- In office 2 July 2019 – 15 July 2024
- Constituency: Hungary

Personal details
- Born: 22 November 1988 (age 37)
- Party: Democratic Coalition
- Education: Eötvös Loránd University

Sándor Rónai (born 22 November 1988) is a Hungarian politician, who has been a member of the National Assembly for the Democratic Coalition since 2025. He was also a Member of the European Parliament from 2019 to 2024.

== Education ==
Rónai graduated from the Faculty of Social Sciences at Eötvös Loránd University. He speaks English and German.

== Career ==
In 2014, Rónai was elected as a member of the Pest County Municipality. He was a founding member of the Democratic Coalition and became its spokesperson in 2018. He was nominated in third place on the Democratic Coalition's European Parliament list and elected as MEP in the 2019 election.

From 2022 to 2024, Rónai had been vice-chair of the Committee of Inquiry to investigate the use of Pegasus and equivalent surveillance spyware. He was a member of the Committee on Budgetary Control, the Committee on the Environment, Public Health and Food Safety, and the Delegation for relations with the NATO Parliamentary Assembly. In addition to his committee assignments, he was part of the European Parliament Intergroup on Climate Change, Biodiversity and Sustainable Development. Rónai run as a candidate (4th place) of his party in the 2024 European Parliament election, but lost his seat since the Democratic Coalition gained only two mandates.

Rónai was elected a Member of Parliament on 19 May 2025, succeeding party leader Ferenc Gyurcsány, who retired from politics. Rónai became vice-chair of the parliament's committee of justice on the next day.

== See also ==
- List of members of the European Parliament for Hungary, 2019–2024
