= Anna Orosz =

Hungarian economist and politician

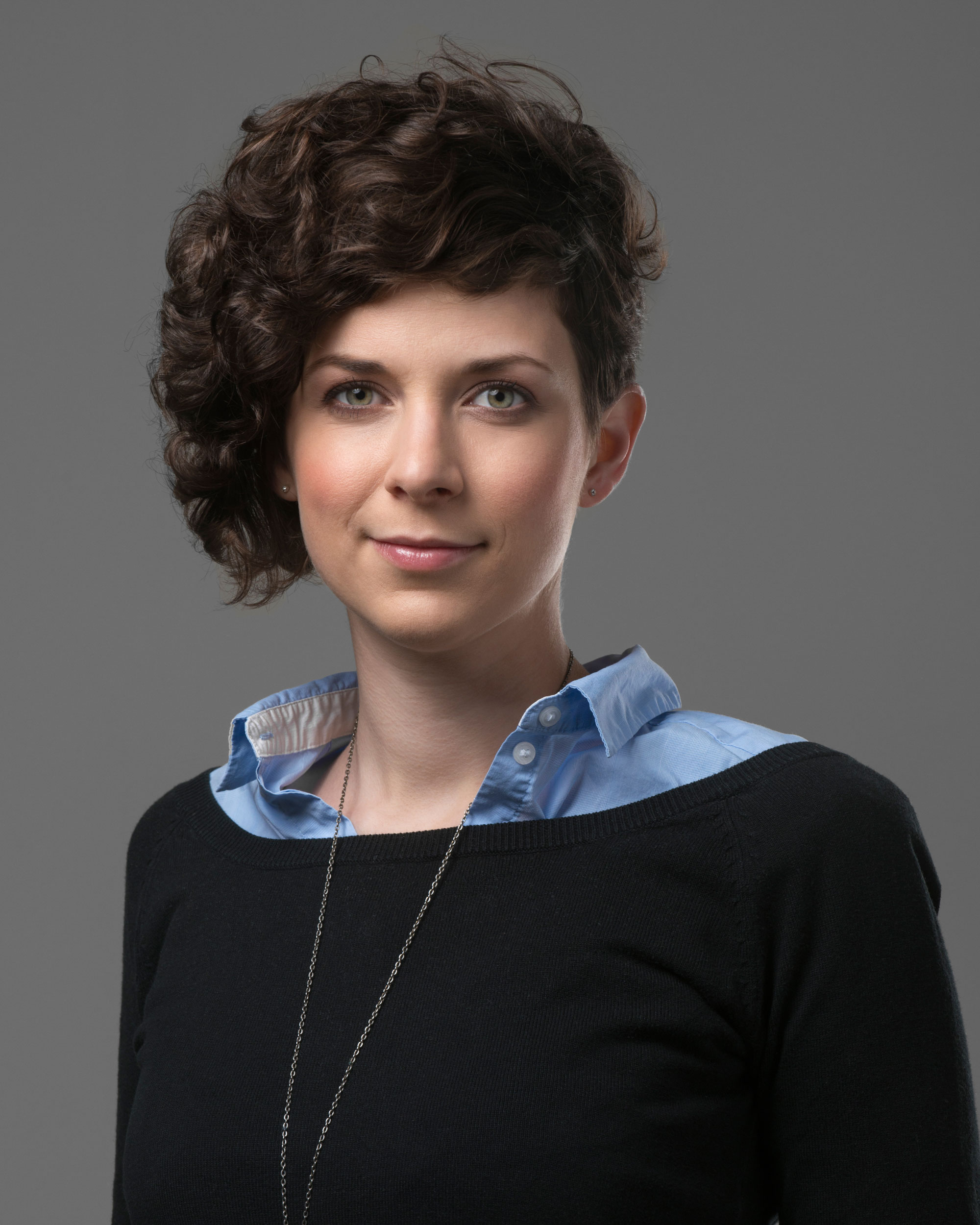

Leader of the Momentum Movement (interim)
- In office 10 October 2021 – 21 November 2021
- Preceded by: András Fekete-Győr
- Succeeded by: Anna Donáth

Deputy Mayor of Újbuda
- In office 13 October 2019 – 2 May 2022

Member of the National Assembly
- In office 2 May 2022 – 5 May 2025

Personal details
- Born: 2 June 1989 (age 37) Budapest, Hungary
- Party: Momentum
- Education: Humboldt University (MSc)

Anna Orosz (born June 2, 1989, Budapest) is a Hungarian economist and politician, Member of Parliament since 2022. From March 2017 to May 2018 she was a member of the board of the Momentum Movement. From October 2019 local government representative Újbuda, she became the deputy mayor of Újbuda. On 11 October 2021, during the 2nd round of the Hungarian Opposition Primary, she took over the management of Momentum from András Fekete-Győr. In the 2022 Hungarian parliamentary election, she was elected as MP to represent Budapest 2nd constituency in the National Assembly.

== Career ==
Orosz is the daughter of Csaba Orosz, an associate professor at Budapest University of Technology and Economics.

Between 2007 and 2011 she attended the BSc in International Management at the Corvinus University of Budapest. She was then an MSc student in economics at the Humboldt University in Berlin. From 2013 she worked as an analyst at the Budapest Institute.

=== Political career ===
Since 2015, she has been an activist in the Momentum Movement. In early 2017, as a member of the movement's leadership, she was one of the faces of the NOlimpia campaign. On March 4, 2017, she was elected a member of the party's presidency at the movement's renewal general assembly. In 2017, according to Forbes magazine, she was the 8th most influential Hungarian woman in public life. As they were not elected to the Parliament in the 2018 elections, the party's presidency, including Anna Orosz, resigned on 5 May 2018.

In November 2018, she became an analyst and communications associate at Political Capital.

On July 15, 2019, she announced that she would return to politics, and as a result of the opposition coalition, she became a candidate for the Momentum Movement in Budapest XI. district (Újbuda). She was elected a representative in the 2019 Hungarian municipal elections.

On October 31, she became a member of the Momentum Movement faction in the district council, and was also elected as one of the deputy mayors of Újbuda. On June 8, 2020, she was elected to the party's new seven-member presidency.

In the 2021 Hungarian Opposition Primary, she was elected as a joint opposition candidate in Budapest No. 2. for the upcoming general election. From 10 October 2021, after the resignation of András Fekete-Győr, she became the interim leader of the Momentum Movement. She ran for the party leadership election on 21 November 2021, where she acquired 28.9 percent of the vote and came to the second place after Anna Donáth. Orosz was elected MP for Újbuda (Budapest 2nd constituency) in the 2022 parliamentary election, defeating Fidesz–KDNP candidate István Simicskó. She became a member of the parliament's Committee on Sustainable Development and Economic Committee, serving in these capacities until 26 February 2024. She was a member of the immunity committee from February to May 2025. Beside that, she also functioned as deputy leader of the Momentum caucus from February 2024 to February 2025.

Following the 2024 European Parliament and local elections, both were significant failures for the Momentum Movement, Orosz did not run for re-election, thus leaving the party's national presidency on 8 July 2024. On 5 May 2025, she announced her resignation as Member of the Parliament.

Party political offices
| Preceded by András Fekete-Győr | President of the Momentum Movement (acting); 2021 | Succeeded by Anna Donáth |
