= Kata Tisza =

Hungarian writer (born 1980)

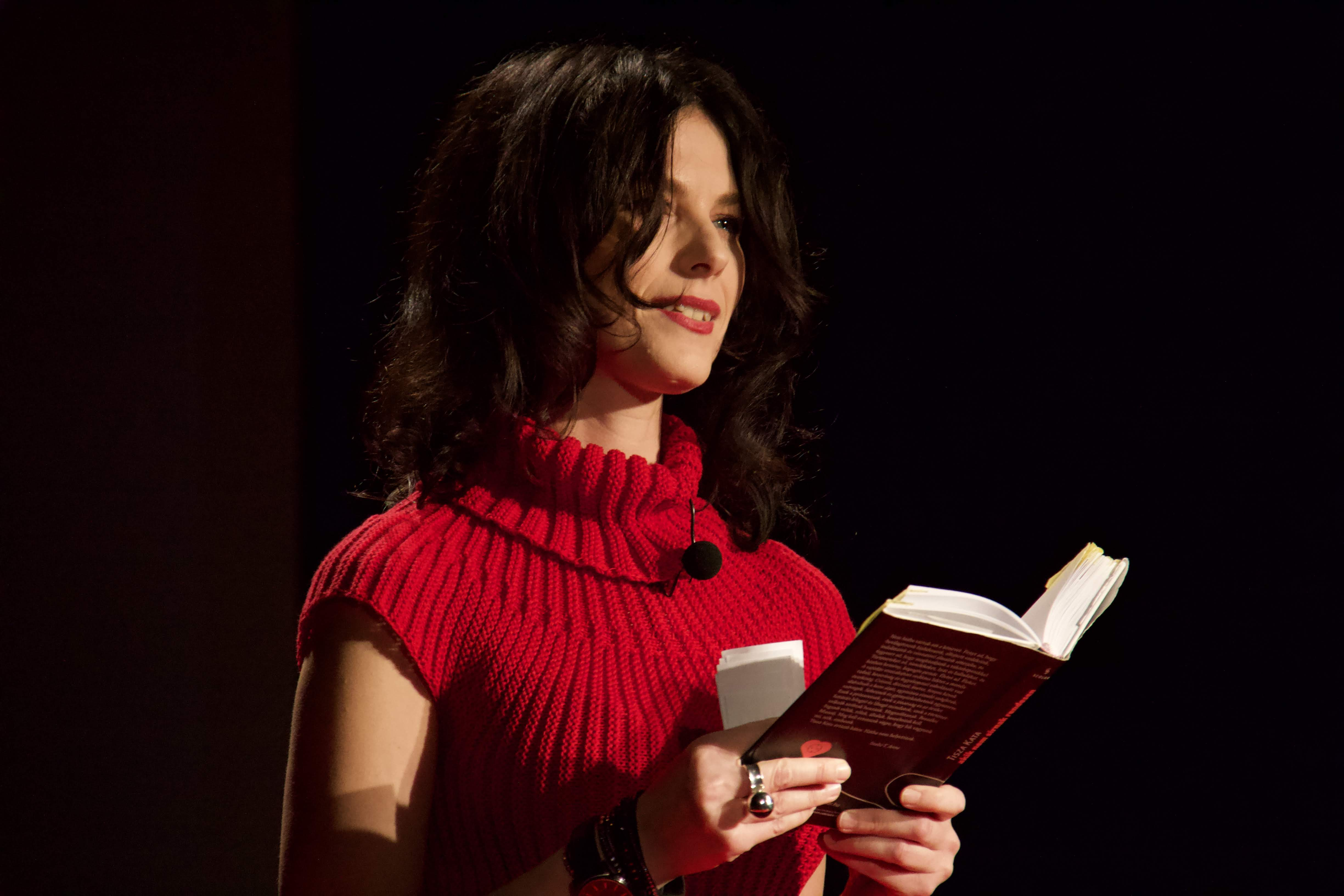
Tisza Kata

Katalin Erzsébet Tisza, commonly known as Kata Tisza, (born 30 August 1980, Târgu Mureș) is a Hungarian writer. She is a descendant of the old noble family Tisza, and a great-great grandchild of former prime minister Kálmán Tisza.

== Novels ==
- Pesti kínálat, 2005. I.A.T. Kiadó, 163 p.
- Hét nap nyár, 2005. Sanoma
- Reváns, 2006. Ulpius-ház könyvkiadó, 167 p.
- Főbűnösök, anthology 2006. Ulpius-ház könyvkiadó, 231 p.
- Magyar pszicho. Alexandra, 221 p.
- Doktor Kleopátra, 2008, Alexandra Kiadó, 216 p.
- Most. Túlélő leszel, nem áldozat, 2019, Scolar kiadó, 504p.
