= Gábor Vágó =

Hungarian economist, investigative journalist and politician

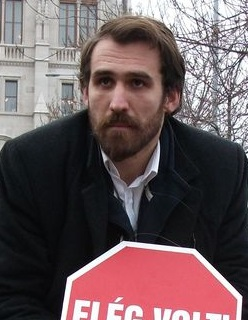
- Vágó during a protest in December 2011

Member of the National Assembly
- In office 14 May 2010 – 5 May 2014

Personal details
- Born: 10 January 1984 (age 42) Kecskemét, Hungary
- Party: LMP (2009–2014, 2018–2024)
- Profession: economist. journalist

Gábor Vágó (born 10 January 1984) is a Hungarian economist, investigative journalist and politician, member of the National Assembly (MP) from Politics Can Be Different (LMP) National List between 2010 and 2014.

== Political career ==
He was a founding member of the LMP party. After the 2010 parliamentary election, he was elected member of the Committee on Audit Office and Budget on 14 May 2010. He also worked on the Committee specialized in Youth, Social, Family, and Housing Affairs from 14 May 2010 until 11 February 2013. On 23 September 2013, he became an appointed member of the Committee on Health Affairs and Economic and Information Technology.

Between February and September 2013, Vágó functioned as an independent MP when the LMP parliamentary faction disbanded according to the house rules, after eight members had left the caucus to establish the Dialogue for Hungary (PM).

Afterwards, Gábor Vágó quit the party and did not run for the spring election. He said he was fed up with “the petty power struggles from which bad people emerge: first of all you manipulate then lie, and then turn against those with whom you struggled together”. However, Vágó told the news website vs.hu that he would keep his mandate in the meantime. LMP's leader, András Schiffer, told MTI that Vágó had not fallen victim to an internal power struggle. He said the decision had more to do with the lawmaker “burning out”. He worked after that for the investigative news portal Átlátszó as a journalist, focusing mainly on issues regarding corruption in Hungary and organized anti-corruption protests in Hungary.

He rejoined LMP formally in 2018 and was a candidate for the parliamentary election that year in one of the districts of his hometown Kecskemét. Vágó was also named a speaker on anti-corruption issues. In 2019, he was elected list leader of the party for the EP election, but the party failed to win a mandate. Vágó again left the party in 2024.
