= Katalin Cseh =

Hungarian physician and politician (born 1988)

Katalin Cseh MEP
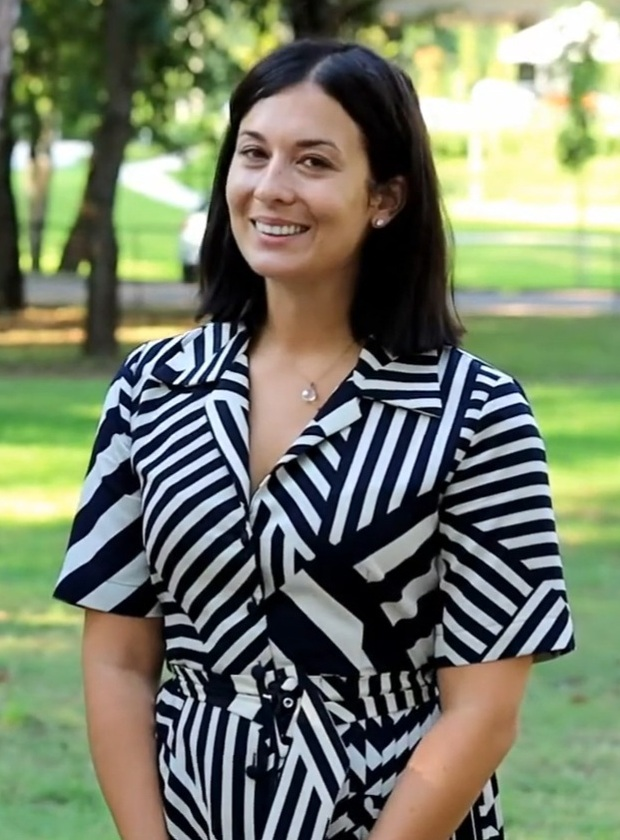
- Cseh in 2020

Member of the European Parliament
- In office 2 July 2019 – 15 July 2024
- Constituency: Hungary

Personal details
- Born: 29 June 1988 (age 38) Montreal, Quebec, Canada
- Party: Momentum Movement (2017-2025)
- Education: Semmelweis University; Erasmus University Rotterdam
- Profession: Politician

Katalin Cseh (born 29 June 1988) is a Canadian-born Hungarian physician and politician. She was elected as a Momentum Movement (part of the Renew Europe party group) Member of the European Parliament (MEP) in the 2019 parliamentary election and served until 2024. In 2024, she became an MP in the Hungarian Parliament.

== Early life and career ==
Katalin Cseh was born on 29 June 1988 in Montreal, Quebec, Canada. Her early education was at Toldy Ferenc High School in Budapest, Hungary. She graduated from Semmelweis University. In 2015, she obtained a master's degree in Health Economics, Policy, and Law from Erasmus University Rotterdam. In the same year, Cseh co-founded Momentum Movement group with nine others. The group campaigned against the Hungarian government's decision to bid for the 2024 Summer Olympics. They petitioned for a referendum on the issue and garnered more than 266,000 signatures. This resulted in the government withdrawing their bid.

Momentum Movement became a centrist political party in March 2017. In August 2017, she was appointed to the governing board of the party. Cseh was a candidate for the party in the 2018 Hungarian parliamentary election. The party did not win any seats in parliament, and the governing board (including Cseh) resigned.

== European Parliament ==
Cseh stood as a candidate for Momentum Movement in the 2019 European parliamentary election. Led by Margrethe Vestager, she was also among the seven-strong "Team Europe" that the centrist Alliance of Liberals and Democrats for Europe Party picked to spearhead its pro-EU, liberal campaign ahead of the elections.

Cseh was first on her party's list, and was elected as one of its two MEPs (the other being Anna Júlia Donáth) in Hungary. In the European Parliament, she is one of the eight vice-chairs of the Renew Europe political group. Cseh is a member of the Committee on Industry, Research, and Energy (since 2019) and the Subcommittee on Human Rights (since 2020). Since 2021, she has been part of the Parliament's delegation to the Conference on the Future of Europe.

In addition to her committee assignments, Cseh is part of the parliament's delegation for relations with the United States. She is also a supporter of the European Parliament Intergroup on Anti-Corruption, the MEP Alliance for Mental Health and the MEPs Against Cancer group.

In September 2022, Cseh was the recipient of the People's Choice: Covid-19 Response Award at The Parliament Magazine's annual MEP Awards. In March 2024, she was one of twenty MEPs to be given a "Rising Star" award at that year's MEP Awards ceremony.

== Political positions ==
In 2020, Cseh and Hilde Vautmans initiated an open letter, in which a group of 23 members of the Renew Europe group called on Josep Borrell to push for coordinated sanctions targeted at Chinese leaders and officials responsible for human rights violations in the Xinjiang re-education camps and in Hong Kong.
