= 2019 European Parliament election in Hungary =

- 26 May 2019

All 21 Hungarian seats to the European Parliament
- Turnout: 43.48% (▲14.51%)
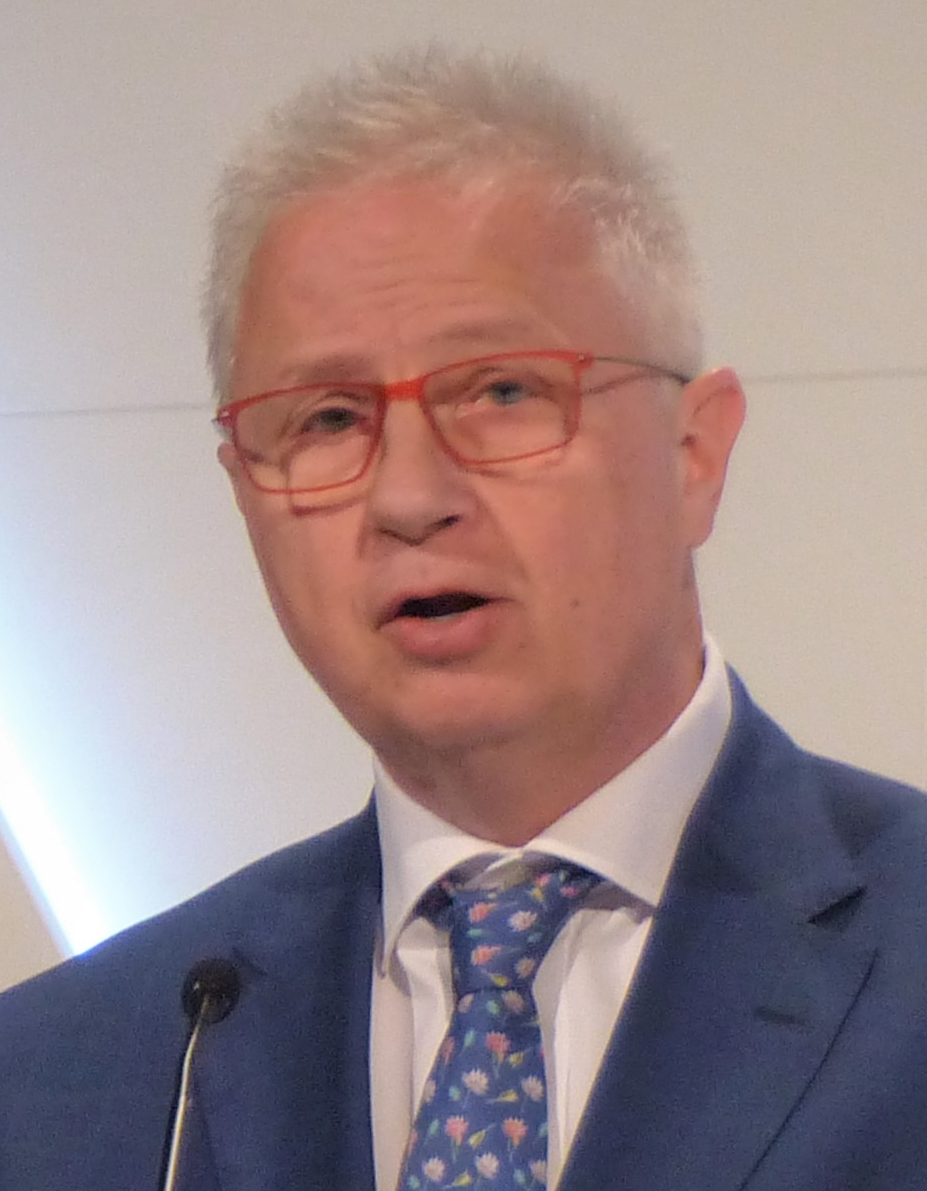

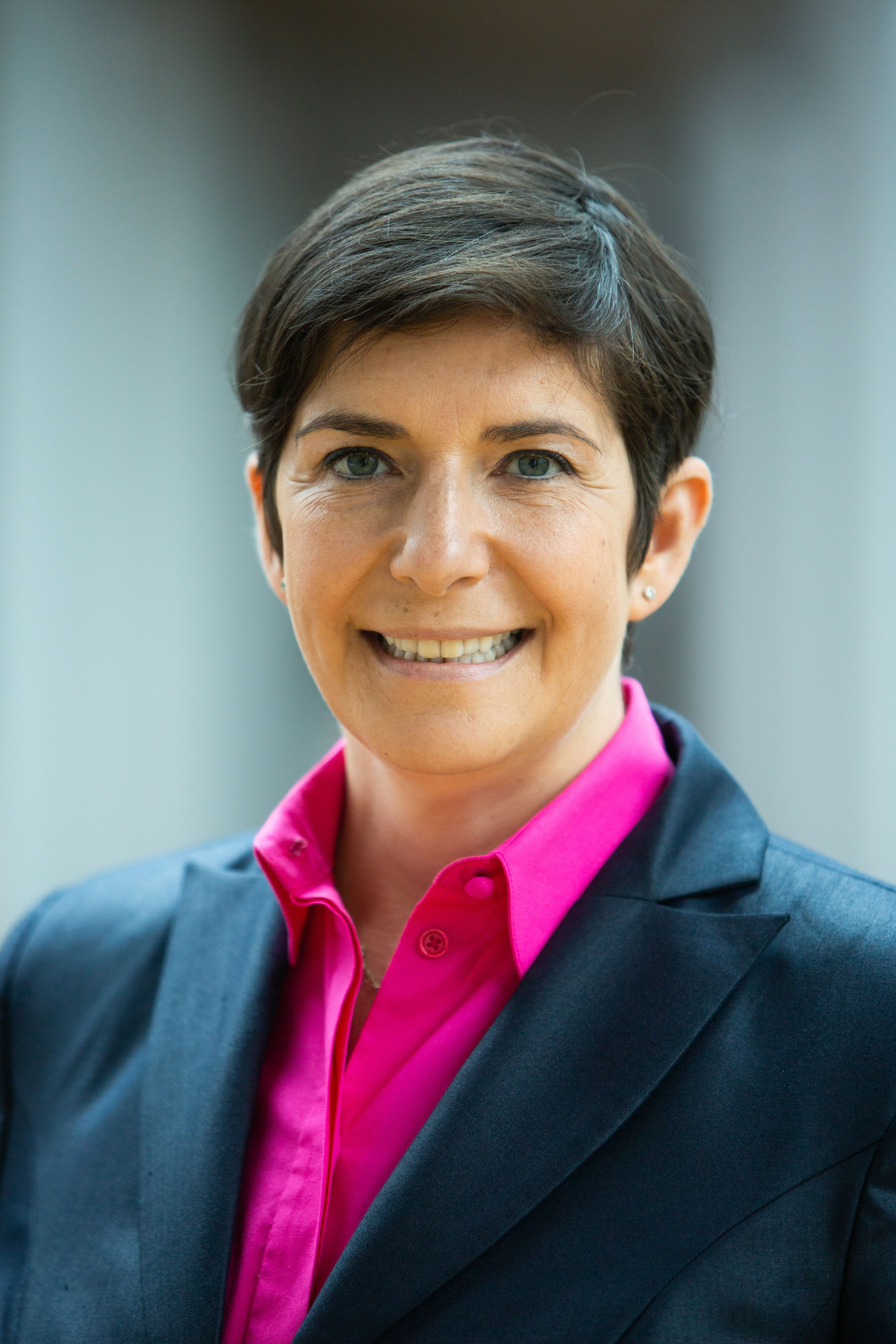

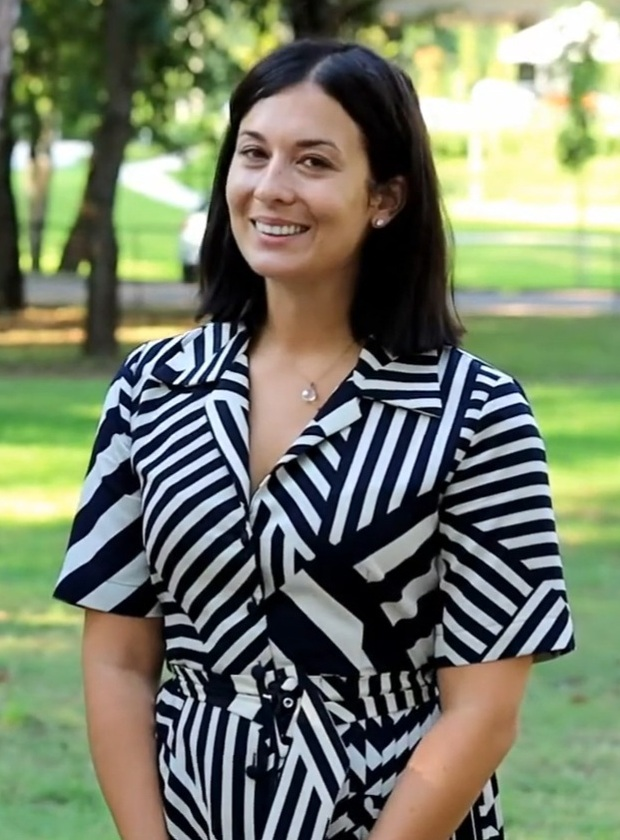

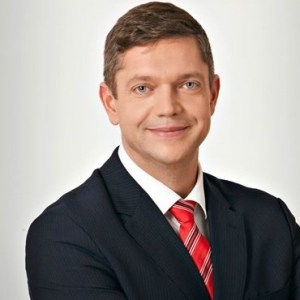

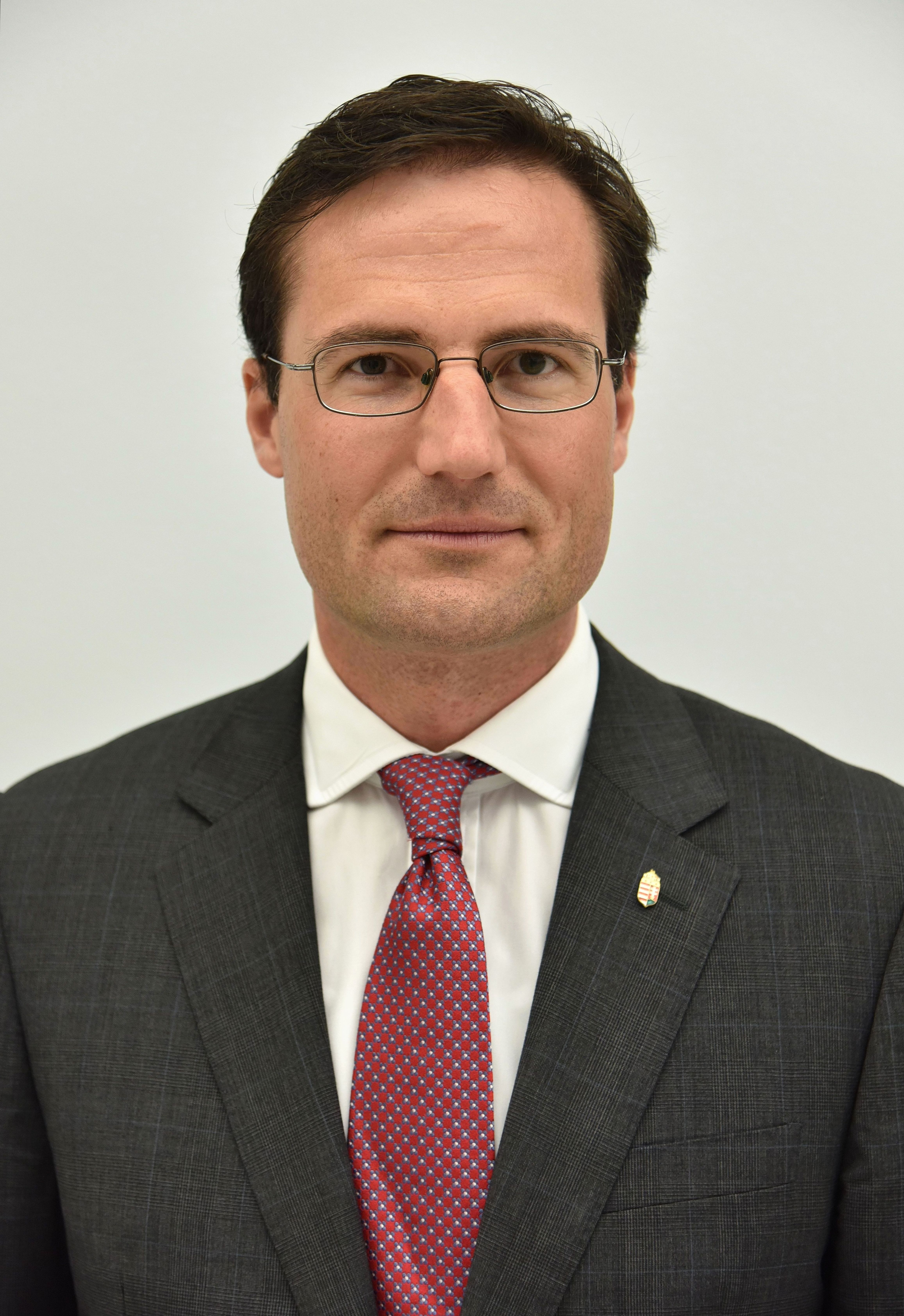
	First party	Second party	Third party
Leader	László Trócsányi	Klára Dobrev	Katalin Cseh
Party	Fidesz–KDNP	DK	Momentum
Alliance	EPP (Note: Membership of Fidesz was suspended.)	S&D	ALDE
Last election	51.48%, 12 seats	9.75%, 2 seats	New party
Seats won	13	4	2
Seat change	▲1	▲2	new party
Popular vote	1,824,220	557,081	344,512
Percentage	52.56%	16.05%	9.93%
Swing	▲1.08	▲6.30	New party
	Fourth party	Fifth party
Leader	Bertalan Tóth	Márton Gyöngyösi
Party	MSZP–Párbeszéd	Jobbik
Alliance	S&D, Greens/EFA	NI
Last election	18.15%, 3 seats (Note: Joint result of MSZP and Együtt–PM in the last EU election)	14.67%, 3 seats
Seats won	1	1
Seat change	▼2	▼2
Popular vote	229,551	220,184
Percentage	6.61%	6.34%
Swing	▼11.54	▼8.33

An election of Members of the European Parliament from Hungary to the European Parliament was held on 26 May 2019, electing the 21 members of the Hungary delegation to the European Parliament as part of the European elections held across the European Union.

== Date of the vote ==
European Parliament Elections are held every five years in the European Union. The vote had to take place from 23 to 26 May 2019, but the member states could set the exact date. Since Hungarian law states elections can only take place on a Sunday, the only possible date was 26 May 2019. Accordingly, President János Áder announced on 4 March 2019 that the vote would be held on 26 May.

== Background ==
=== Fidesz ===
During early 2019, the Hungarian government launched a poster campaign targeting European commission president Jean-Claude Juncker and Hungarian-American philanthropist George Soros. The government campaign accuses Juncker and Soros of wanting “to weaken member states’ rights to protect their own borders” and claims “they want ...migrants’ visas”. Due to the poster campaign, some members of the European People's Party (EPP), which the Hungarian governing party Fidesz is a member of, started moves to remove it from the group.” Hungarian Prime Minister Viktor Orbán, called those who were calling for his removal from the EPP "Useful idiots".” In response to the political ad campaign, Manfred Weber, Spitzenkandidat of the EPP demanded Orbán apologize for and renounce the criticism levied against the EU by him and his party or face Fidesz's suspension from the EPP.

On 20 March 2019, the European People's Party voted to suspend the membership of Fidesz citing its anti-immigration stance, and personal attacks on Jean-Claude Juncker and George Soros. Prime Minister and Fidesz leader Viktor Orbán had threatened to pull out of the EPP if it was suspended.

== Parties contesting ==
According to election law, Hungary consists of a single election district and all parties that collect 20,000 valid signatures from eligible citizens are put on the ballot. By the deadline (23 April 2019, 16:00), eleven parties or party alliances had submitted signature lists. Of those, two parties were refused registration, lacking a sufficient number of valid signatures : the United Hungarian National People's Party (EMNP) and the Tea Party Hungary (TPM). Nine qualified lists were approved by the National Election Committee (NVB) to be put on the ballot, of which two of them are shared lists. All parties represented in the Országgyűlés participated in the election, in addition to four extra-parliamentary parties. The parties appeared on the ballot papers in the following randomly drawn order:

Hungarian parties contesting the 2019 European Parliament election
Abbr.	Party	Lead candidate	Last election		EP affiliation
MSZP–Párbeszéd	Hungarian Socialist Party–Dialogue for Hungary	Bertalan Tóth	10.9%+7.25% (Note: Common list with the now-defunct Together in the 2014 election)	2+1 seats	S&D+Greens/EFA
MKKP	Hungarian Two Tailed Dog Party	Zsuzsanna Döme	did not contest		
Jobbik	Movement for a Better Hungary	Márton Gyöngyösi	14.67%	3 seats	NI
Fidesz–KDNP	Fidesz – Hungarian Civic Alliance–Christian Democratic People's Party	László Trócsányi	51.48%	11+1 seats	EPP
Momentum	Momentum Movement	Katalin Cseh	did not contest		ALDE
DK	Democratic Coalition	Klára Dobrev	9.75%	2 seats	S&D
MH	Our Homeland Movement	László Toroczkai	did not contest		
Munkáspárt	Hungarian Workers' Party	Gyula Thürmer	did not contest		
LMP	Politics Can Be Different	Gábor Vágó	5.04%	1 seat	Greens/EFA

== Opinion polling ==
View source data.

Polling firm	Fieldwork date	Fidesz–KDNP	MSZP–Párbeszéd	DK	Jobbik	Momentum	LMP	MKKP	MH	Lead
2019 election	26 May 2019	52.62	6.62	16.09	6.37	9.83	2.17	2.61	3.30	36.81
Nézőpont	25 May 2019	55	10	11	9	7	3	2	2	41
Politico	24 May 2019	55.08	8.51	10.68	9.53	6.02	3.34	3.00	1.53	44.40
Publicus	16-22 May 2019	52	13	11	13	6	4	1	1	39
Medián	15-18 May 2019	52	10.5	10	11.5	5.5	4	3	3	40.5
Századvég	10-18 May 2019	54.8	7.5	11.8	9.7	6.5	3.2	0	3.2	43
MR Center	15 May 2019	42.1	9.5	8.3	9.8	6.2	1.8	3.5	8.3	32.3
Nézőpont	May 2019	54	10	10	10	6	5	3	2	44
Závecz Research	4-14 May 2019	53	12	11	12	4	5	2	2	41
Idea Institute	2-6 May 2019	50	12	9	13	3	5	2	0	37
Nézőpont	1-26 April 2019	57	10	8	10	5	4	2	2	47
Závecz Research	15-25 April 2019	57	13	11	6	5	4	2	1	44
MR Center	16-26 April 2019	50.30	9.23	10.20	10.35	6.25	3.70	4.70	1.40	49.95
Századvég	10-21 April 2019	54	10	9	14	4	4	0	2	40
Závecz Research	April 2019	53	12	9	12	4	4	2	2	44
Medián	Mar-Apr 2019	53	12	8	11	5	7	2	0	41
Idea Institute	29 Mar-1 Apr 2019	48	12	9	14	6	4	3	2	34
Publicus	13-20 March 2019	52	15	6	16	6	3	2	0	36
Závecz Research	March 2019	50	13	9	14	5	4	1	2	36
Nézőpont	1-28 March 2019	56	11	6	12	4	5	4	2	44
Idea Institute	28 Feb-3 Mar 2019	47	12	9	17	4	3	4	2	30
Nézőpont	31 Jan-22 Feb 2019	54	11	6	13	4	5	4	3	41
Nézőpont	31 Jan-22 Feb 2019	54	11	6	13	4	5	4	3	41
European Parliament	5-15 February 2019	53.0	12.3	8.3	13.3	3.7	4.7	1.7	2.0	39.7
Závecz Research	3-10 February 2019	49	12	9	14	4	4	2	2	35
European Parliament	6 February 2019	49.3	13.3	7.2	15.5	5.0	4.5	3.7	1.2	33.8
2014 election	25 May 2014	51.48	10.90	9.75	14.67	–	5.04	–	–	36.81

== Results ==
Party	Votes	%	Seats	+/–
Fidesz–KDNP	1,824,220	52.56	13	+1
Democratic Coalition	557,081	16.05	4	+2
Momentum Movement	344,512	9.93	2	New
Hungarian Socialist Party–Dialogue for Hungary	229,551	6.61	1	–2
Jobbik	220,184	6.34	1	–2
Our Homeland Movement	114,156	3.29	0	New
Hungarian Two Tailed Dog Party	90,912	2.62	0	New
Politics Can Be Different	75,498	2.18	0	–1
Hungarian Workers' Party	14,452	0.42	0	New
Total	3,470,566	100.00	21	0
Valid votes	3,470,566	99.49		
Invalid/blank votes	17,775	0.51		
Total votes	3,488,341	100.00		
Registered voters/turnout	8,008,353	43.56		
Source: Valasztas.hu

=== By county and in the diaspora ===
County results in %	Fidesz–KDNP	DK	Momentum	MSZP–Párbeszéd	Jobbik	MH	MKKP	LMP	Munkáspárt	Total Votes Cast	Turnout
Baranya	50.13	18.43	9.44	6.63	6.06	3.13	2.89	2.84	0.46	125,673	41.35%
Bács-Kiskun	58.81	13.43	7.27	5.08	7.05	3.67	2.19	2.10	0.39	166,013	39.80%
Békés	52.70	16.74	6.80	6.17	8.65	4.09	2.14	2.01	0.46	109,775	38.65%
Borsod-Abaúj-Zemplén	51.65	15.77	5.79	7.15	11.69	4.02	1.82	1.52	0.59	202,268	38.31%
Budapest (capital)	41.17	19.79	17.35	9.04	3.18	2.32	3.83	2.98	0.34	689,526	52.51%
Csongrád	49.32	13.89	9.47	11.53	5.38	4.95	2.99	2.07	0.42	145,393	43.90%
Fejér	53.83	16.01	9.15	5.31	7.03	3.69	2.58	1.98	0.43	148,563	43.38%
Győr-Moson-Sopron	59.17	13.74	8.44	4.90	5.79	3.26	2.28	2.07	0.35	166,602	46.36%
Hajdú-Bihar	57.37	14.16	7.96	5.54	7.14	3.17	2.21	1.95	0.47	156,691	36.55%
Heves	52.63	16.12	7.14	5.83	10.26	3.95	1.88	1.74	0.46	100,093	41.38%
Jász-Nagykun-Szolnok	53.44	14.95	6.00	6.53	9.60	5.28	1.93	1.58	0.70	113,542	37.42%
Komárom-Esztergom	50.08	19.65	8.56	5.59	7.34	3.50	2.61	2.22	0.43	101,790	41.40%
Nógrád	56.90	15.65	5.11	7.27	6.76	4.47	1.57	1.40	0.86	61,936	39.38%
Pest	51.38	15.55	11.70	5.64	5.29	3.34	3.23	2.54	0.34	449,270	44.20%
Somogy	55.30	17.22	6.44	5.38	8.90	2.87	1.79	1.67	0.43	102,981	40.70%
Szabolcs-Szatmár-Bereg	60.66	13.45	5.32	6.27	8.25	2.92	1.45	1.25	0.42	170,754	38.05%
Tolna	59.02	14.40	6.63	5.98	6.11	3.53	2.01	1.88	0.43	73,036	40.17%
Vas	61.03	13.03	7.42	5.63	6.43	2.40	2.01	1.76	0.29	100,169	48.80%
Veszprém	54.75	15.20	8.22	5.96	7.53	3.50	2.39	2.06	0.38	129,678	45.32%
Zala	58.13	15.63	6.91	4.84	6.81	3.58	1.86	1.89	0.34	100,565	44.72%
Foreign representations	41.30	9.60	29.04	6.37	2.29	2.07	5.22	4.00	0.11	17,749	87.47%
Diaspora	95.97	0.60	0.96	0.45	0.32	0.63	0.58	0.36	0.12	57,777	55.29%
Total	52.56	16.05	9.93	6.61	6.34	3.29	2.62	2.18	0.42		

=== European groups ===
European group		Seats 2014	Seats 2019	Change
European People's Party	EPP	12 / 21	13 / 21	▲1
Progressive Alliance of Socialists and Democrats	S&D	4 / 21	5 / 21	▲1
Alliance of Liberals and Democrats for Europe	ALDE	0	2 / 21	▲2
Non-Inscrits	NI	3 / 21	1 / 21	▼2
The Greens–European Free Alliance	Greens-EFA	2 / 21	0	▼2
		21	21	

== List of seat winners ==
On the Fidesz–KDNP list: (EPP Group)

1. László Trócsányi
2. József Szájer
3. Lívia Járóka
4. Tamás Deutsch
5. András Gyürk
6. Kinga Gál
7. György Hölvényi (KDNP)
8. Enikő Győri
9. Ádám Kósa
10. Andrea Bocskor
11. Andor Deli
12. Balázs Hidvéghi
13. Edina Tóth

On the Democratic Coalition list: (S&D)

1. Klára Dobrev
2. Csaba Molnár
3. Sándor Rónai
4. Attila Ara-Kovács

On the Momentum Movement list: (ALDE)

1. Katalin Cseh
2. Anna Donáth

On the Hungarian Socialist Party–Dialogue for Hungary list: (S&D)

1. István Ujhelyi (Note: Bertalan Tóth was elected as lead candidate but did not take his seat.)

On the Jobbik list: (Non-inscrits)

1. Márton Gyöngyösi

== Analysis ==
These elections marked the change of balance in Hungarian politics. Although Fidesz-KNDP remained largest and dominant party, but MSZP and Jobbik were replaced by Democratic Coalition and Momentum Movement as leading opposition parties. LMP was wiped off from political sphere. The results of the European elections in Hungary were also viewed with interest for their potential implications in the upcoming local elections in 2019. András Bódis of Válasz Online noted possibility that in some municipalities joint opposition candidates can defeat Fidesz-KNDP candidates.
