= László Trócsányi =

Hungarian diplomat and politician (born 1956)

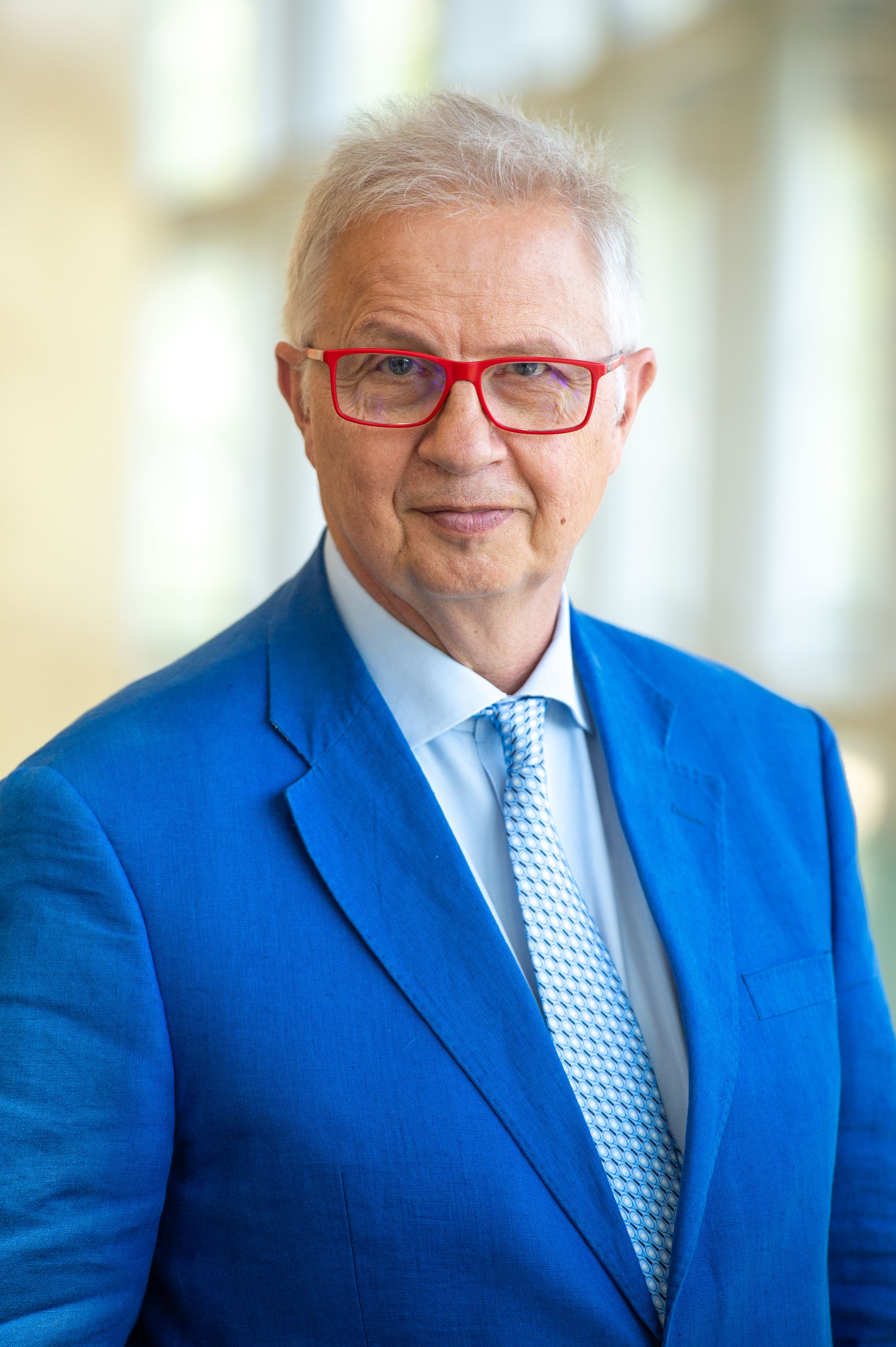
- Trócsányi in 2022

Member of the European Parliament
- In office 2 July 2019 – 15 July 2024
- Constituency: Hungary

Minister of Justice
- In office 6 June 2014 – 30 June 2019
- Prime Minister: Viktor Orbán
- Preceded by: Tibor Navracsics (Public Administration and Justice)
- Succeeded by: Judit Varga

Hungarian Ambassador to France
- In office October 2010 – 5 June 2014

Member of the Constitutional Court
- In office February 2007 – October 2010

Hungarian Ambassador to Belgium and Luxembourg
- In office 2000–2004

Personal details
- Born: 6 March 1956 (age 70) Budapest, Hungary
- Party: Fidesz (affiliated)
- Spouse: Krisztina Doór
- Children: 3
- Education: Eötvös Loránd University

László Trócsányi (born 6 March 1956) is a Hungarian lawyer and academic and former diplomat and politician who most recently served as a Member of the European Parliament (MEP) from 2019 to 2024. Formerly, he was the Hungarian ambassador to Belgium and Luxembourg from 2000 to 2004, a member of the Constitutional Court of Hungary from 2007 to 2010, and ambassador to France from 2010 to 2014. He was Minister of Justice in the third and fourth Orbán cabinets, from 6 June 2014 to 30 June 2019.

== Studies and academic career ==
Trócsányi began his university studies in 1975 at the Faculty of Law of the Attila József University of Szeged (József Attila Tudományegyetem, since 2000 University of Szeged). In 1977, he joined the Faculty of Law of the Eötvös Loránd University in Budapest. He graduated in 1980.

He began working as a research associate in the Hungarian Parliament Library and then became a collaborator of the Institute of Legal Studies of the Hungarian Academy of Sciences (Magyar Tudományos Akadémia, MTA). Admitted to the bar, he was hired as a lawyer in 1985 in Budapest, but remained a collaborator at the MTA.

In 1987, he became an assistant at the Department of Constitutional Law at the University of Szeged. From 1989 to 1990, he was a fellow at the Catholic University of Louvain and worked with Professor Francis Delpérée. Trócsányi obtained his doctorate in 1991 with a thesis on the administrative jurisdiction in comparative law.

In 1991, he co-founded the law firm Nagy & Trócsányi with Péter Nagy in Budapest. Throughout his later years in politics, his law firm has remained involved in representing clients in relation with governmental matters.

Trócsányi was appointed lecturer in the Constitutional Law Department of the University of Szeged in 1992 and chaired the department from 1994 to 2010. In addition to these activities, he also held the position of Associate Dean of the Faculty of Law of the University of Szeged. Since 2000, he has been an accredited professor at Szeged University and for many years held the position of Secretary of the International Association of Constitutional Law. Between 2005 and 2007, he chaired the Committee for International Relations of the Budapest Bar Association.

In 2004 he became director of the Center for European Studies at the University of Szeged. Between 2005 and 2008, he worked as an associate professor at Université Lyon-III. In 2013, he initiated the creation of the Centre universitaire francophone at the University of Szeged.

== Judicial and diplomatic career ==
Trócsányi served as Ambassador of Hungary to Belgium and Luxembourg (2000–2004) and to France (2010–2014).

He was also a substitute member of the Venice Commission of the Council of Europe (2005–2013) and a member of the Hungarian Constitutional Court (2007–2010).

== Political career ==
On 6 June 2014, Trócsányi was appointed Minister of Justice in the Third Orbán Government. As Minister, he initiated legislations that the Juncker Commission brought to the European Court of Justice to scrutinize whether they harmonize with the EU laws or not. Among the norms introduced during his tenure were the criminalization of NGOs providing legal assistance to asylum seekers, the amendments to the higher education law that made the Central European University relocate its headquarters from Budapest, and the norms that created legal environment for establishing border transit camps where asylum seekers are detained before a decision is made about whether they are allowed into the country or not. A draft law introducing special administrative courts in charge of corruption cases was finally put on hold as the membership of the Fidesz party was suspended in the European People's Party. With Trócsányi's approval, Hungary chose to extradite two Russian arms-dealers who had previously arrested in a joint operation of the US and Hungarian police, to Russia rather than to the US. Hungary also granted immediate asylum to disgraced former prime minister of North Macedonia Nikola Gruevski, who was convicted in his native country of corruption, while refusing asylum to people fleeing from conflicts abroad. The developments in Hungary under his tenure as Justice Minister raised severe concerns as regards the erosion in the rule of law in the country. The European Parliament called for an Article 7 procedure to be opened against Hungary for serious breach of the founding EU values during his mandate.

Trócsányi was the lead candidate of the Fidesz party list at the 2019 European Parliament election, when he was elected a Member of the European Parliament (MEP).

=== Commissioner-designate ===
Trócsányi was nominated as the EU commissioner from Hungary on 9 September 2019. He had previously considered the vice-presidency of the European Parliament's Committee on Constitutional Affairs. Ursula von der Leyen offered him the portfolio of Commissioner for European neighborhood policy and enlargement. His nomination was criticized by several Balkan scholars and observers, taking account of his alleged role in undermining the rule of law in Hungary. Von der Leyen defended her choice, stating that Hungary's objectives "are clear regarding the integration of the Western Balkans, which are in line with the political agenda of the new European Commission".

Trócsányi had to be confirmed as Commissioner-designate in October by the European Parliament during a committee meeting in the committee on foreign affairs, where he could face strong opposition by Socialists, Greens and Liberals. Commissioner designates have to be assessed by the European Parliament Committee on Legal Affairs (JURI) a committee responsible for legal political affairs, its members being members of parliament, representatives, in the form of a procedure assessing possible conflicts of interest. On 26 September 2019, it was reported that Trócsányi was to be questioned by JURI about declarations of interests, due to a potential financial conflict of interests. Later that day, JURI sent a letter with its decision on the potential conflict of interest to the president of the European Parliament, David Sassoli, having by 11 votes to 9 adopted the decision to reject his nomination, because his personal finances in connection with his law firm, founded before becoming Minister of Justice, were an unacceptable conflict of interest, and raising concerns - without presenting a court judgement or any official document - in relation to the extradition of Russian suspects to Russia based on a court judgement during his time as the Hungarian minister of justice. Trócsányi published a statement on his Twitter account on the 26th, stating that he would take all legal steps against the JURI decision. However, on 27 September, Sassoli asked for clarification on the matter, having decided that the suggestion of the JURI committee was not based on proper evidence. Sassoli asked JURI either to state where the conflict of interest lay and to recommend how the candidate could resolve it, or to conclude that Trócsányi was unable to become a European commissioner. Another hearing of the matter was therefore arranged for the following Monday. On 30 September, JURI - not being able to give a justified recommendation - issued a letter rejecting the Trócsányi nomination by 12 votes to 9, stating that he was unable to fill the position of commissioner-designate due to a possible conflict of interest - still not based on evidence. Thereafter, President-elect Von der Leyen asked Prime Minister Viktor Orbán to propose a new candidate. Orbán nominated Olivér Várhelyi, Hungary's Permanent Representative to the EU, instead of Professor Trócsányi. Francois-Xavier Bellamy, French member of the European Parliament stated that the procedure against László Trócsányi was "politically and ideologically motivated" and that it was completely against the law and against the mission of the JURI committee.

== Views ==
Defending the Orbán government's immigration policy, Trócsányi stated that "Central Europe is very reluctant to accept multiculturalism, especially since it does not seem to work so well in Western Europe". He believes that the issue of migration is decisive, "because it affects the composition of the population of the country, and therefore the type of society in which we will live, not only today but in twenty years." He is critical of the idea of the migrant quotas floated by the European Union that would impose embracement of foreign populations on the EU countries that deny participation in the redistribution of the illegal migrants who arrived in the more economically developed parts of the EU in search of a better standard of living. In his opinion, this obligation may affect the national sovereignty and the constitutional identity of the Hungarian State.

== Personal life ==
László Trócsányi is married and has three children.

Political offices
Preceded by Tibor Navracsics	Minister of Justice; 2014–2019	Succeeded by Judit Varga
