= Momentum Movement =

Momentum Movement Momentum Mozgalom
- Abbreviation: Momentum
- Leader: Kincső Szilas
- Deputy Leader: Lajos Lőcsei
- Executive Board Members: Lajos Lőcsei; Dávid Bedő; János Stummer; Viktória Vajda; Eszter Posch; Milán Ruzsics
- Spokesperson: Áron Varsányi
- Founded: 4 March 2017
- Headquarters: 1077 Budapest, Rózsa utca 22.
- Newspaper: Van remény
- Youth wing: Momentum TizenX
- Membership: 2,500
- Ideology: Liberalism
- Political position: Centre
- European affiliation: Alliance of Liberals and Democrats for Europe
- European Parliament group: Renew Europe (2019–2024)
- International affiliation: Liberal International (observer member)
- Colours: Purple
- Slogan: Új arcok, új Magyarország ('New faces, new Hungary')
- National Assembly: 0 / 199 (0%)
- European Parliament: 0 / 21 (0%)
- County Assemblies: 37 / 381
- General Assembly of Budapest: 0 / 33

Website
- momentum.hu

Momentum Movement (Hungarian: Momentum Mozgalom, Momentum) is a centrist Hungarian political party founded in March 2017. It came to national prominence as a political association in January 2017 after organizing a petition about the Budapest bid for the 2024 Summer Olympics, calling for a public referendum on the matter. The petition, which gathered over 266,151 signatures, was successful, but the government cancelled the Olympic bid before a referendum could have been held. After its establishment as a political party, Momentum quickly built a national following, and presently has approximately 4,000 members. Momentum party candidates appeared on the ballot in most electoral districts in the 2018 Hungarian parliamentary election, promoting the replacement of the government of Viktor Orbán and advocating a new generation of political change in the country. The party obtained 3.06% of the votes, failed to reach the 5% threshold and did not get any seats in the National Assembly. In the 2019 European Parliament election in Hungary, the party obtained 9.86% and became the third largest party in the election. Two candidates of the party – Katalin Cseh and Anna Donáth – were elected to the European Parliament. In the 2022 Hungarian parliamentary election it ran under the list of the United for Hungary and entered parliament for the first time with 10 MPs.

== Political positions ==
Momentum advocates for the replacement of the present Hungarian political elite, including the government of Viktor Orbán, with a "new breed of political community in Hungary." The party is generally pro-European, pro-globalisation, and anti-Putin, claiming that Hungary does not need to sacrifice its own interests in order to fulfil its commitments to the European Union. The party's social views are largely progressive in nature; it supports same-sex marriage, the decriminalisation of cannabis, and abortion rights. Momentum nonetheless calls itself a centrist party, and rejects classification on either side of the political spectrum. It calls for bipartisan co-operation, writing in its mission statement that Hungary "must not be divided by ideological battles, but brought together by common goals."

== History ==
In early 2015, the Momentum Movement group was created by ten Hungarians. On November 3, 2016, the group registered as an association, led by lawyer Dániel Károly Csala. By February 2017, the association lead a drive for a referendum on Budapest's bid for the 2024 Summer Olympics: they had 143 members and 1,800 activists. On March 4, 2017, Momentum Movement became an official political party, with 99 founding members. András Fekete-Győr was elected as party leader, while Anna Orosz, Tamás Soproni, Edina Pottyondy and Barnabás Kádár became deputy presidents.

In May 2017, pollsters estimated that the party stood at 3% national support. Most of its supporters were high school graduates under the age of 40 or college-educated urban residents. In October 2017, the party released its platform for the upcoming election (Hungarian: országos program), a 363-page document proposing solutions to an array of perceived issues in the Hungarian governmental system. The critical reception to the document was mixed: one major Hungarian news outlet, the Magyar Idők, called the document a "pile of empty promises," while another, hvg.hu, wrote that the document's proposed healthcare policy seemed "the most detailed and thorough." In March 2018, the party announced that their parliamentary candidates would be on the ballot in 97 out of 106 electoral districts in Hungary. On April 8, 2018, the party obtained 3.08% of the popular vote in the parliamentary elections. Momentum did not meet the threshold for the party to be recognized in parliament, but qualified for government subsidies for the next term.

On May 5, 2018, the president of the party resigned, and the three head directors of the party temporarily took over leadership. In April 2019, the party was registered for the 2019 European Parliament election. On May 26, 2019, the party obtained 9.86% of the popular vote (becoming the third largest party in the election), thus meeting the 5% threshold: two candidates of the party were elected to the European Parliament.

In 2019 local election, the party managed to win mayorships of three Budapest districts and 29 seats in counties' assemblies (mostly in Pest county).

The party was part of the electoral coalition United for Hungary for the 2022 parliamentary elections. They participated in the 2021 opposition primary. They secured candidates for 15 constituencies and 21.73% of the popular vote. However their candidate for Prime Minister, András Fekete-Győr showed the weakest performance, only receiving 3.39% of votes. Subsequently the party endorsed Péter Márki-Zay on October 7, the day before Gergely Karácsony withdrew in his favor.

Fekete Győr resigned from party leadership on October 10, replaced by MEP Anna Donáth to fill a half-year mandate. Due to her pregnancy, she did not run for re-election on 29 May, 2022, and Ferenc Gelencsér was elected party leader.

From mid-January 2023, the party launched a mysterious billboard campaign featuring a silhouette with the phrase "Who can lead us on a new path?". On February 2 it was revealed this was teasing Anna Donáth's return, who expressed her desire to reorganize the opposition and re-gain voter trust, though Gelencsér remained the party's leader.

Donáth positioned the party in opposition to DK, such as in her editorial on October 25, 2023 criticizing the party for representing a "culture of lies" over a "culture of truth". Though previously it was claimed Gelencsér would remain party leader until the 2024 elections, on December 20, 2023 he himself stated Donáth is ready to take back leadership. She and six members of her presidency took their positions on January 28, 2024.

The party showed a poor performance in the simultaneously held 2024 European Parliament and local elections. They failed to reach the threshold to retain their seats in either the European Parliament (3.70%) or the General Assembly of Budapest (4.98%). Tamás Soproni held his position in Budapest District VI., and András Rózsa was elected mayor in District XIV. over the incumbent MSZP mayor Csaba Horváth. Over the poor results, Anna Donáth resigned from leadership. András Fekete-Győr expressed his desire to return to internal leadership, but was defeated by Márton Tompos.

Over 2025, a number of party members argued the party should not run for the 2026 parliamentary election as to not obstruct Tisza Party's opportunity for "regime change". András Fekete-Győr spoke in favor of this on May 7, 2025; on May 12, the whole presidency and MP Endre Tóth supported the idea.

On 7 June 2025, Telex published a new statement, which said that the Momentum will not run officially in the 2026 parliamentary elections. Several senior party figures, including former leader Fekete-Győr, claimed that Fidesz offered the party a lot of money to run in the election, but it rejected the offer.

== Organizational structure ==
=== Organizational hubs ===
Momentum has 95 organizational hubs across Hungary, as well as ten international hubs in Germany, Austria, the Netherlands, the UK, Belgium, France, Denmark and Sweden.

=== Organizational structure ===
Operation of Momentum is overseen by a chair of five members, including the president of the party (see below), while the Congress of Delegates (Hungarian: Küldöttgyűlés) serves as the party's primary decision-making group.

=== Chair members ===
- President: András Fekete-Győr, a lawyer and one of the founders of Momentum
- Vice President: Anna Júlia Donáth, a sociologist who previously worked with NGOs on problems of immigration and gay rights
- Executive Board Members
  - Dániel Berg, previously the international attorney of Momentum
  - Miklós Hajnal, the leader of Momentum's anti-Olympic bid campaign

== Election results ==
=== National Assembly ===
Election	Leader	Constituency		Party list		Seats	+/–	Status
Election	Leader	Votes	%	Votes	%	Seats	+/–	Status
2018	András Fekete-Győr	75,033	1.36% (#6)	175,229	3.06% (#6)	0 / 199	new	Extra-parliamentary
2022 (Note: Run within United for Hungary coalition.)	Anna Donáth	1,983,708	36.90% (#2)	1,947,331	34.44% (#2)	10 / 199	▲10	Opposition
2026	Did not contest							

=== European Parliament ===
Election	List leader	Votes	%	Seats	+/−	EP Group
2019	Katalin Cseh	344,512	9.93 (#3)	2 / 21	New	RE
2024	Anna Donáth	169,082	3.70 (#5)	0 / 21	▼2	−

== History of leaders ==
	Image	Name	Entered office	Left office	Length of Leadership
1		András Fekete-Győr	4 March 2017	10 October 2021	4 years, 7 months and 6 days
–		Anna Orosz (acting)	10 October 2021	21 November 2021	1 month and 11 days
2		Anna Donáth	21 November 2021	29 May 2022	6 months and 8 days
3		Ferenc Gelencsér	29 May 2022	28 January 2024	1 year, 7 months and 30 days
(2)		Anna Donáth	28 January 2024	7 July 2024	5 months and 9 days
4		Márton Tompos	7 July 2024	31 August 2025	1 year, 1 month and 24 days
5		András Rózsa	31 August 2025	28 July 2026	10 months and 28 days
6		Kincső Szilas	28 July 2026	Incumbent	2 months and 14 days
