= Budapest bid for the 2024 Summer Olympics =

Bids for the 2024 Summer Olympics and Paralympics
Overview
- Games of the XXXIII Olympiad; XVII Paralympic Games

Details
- City: Budapest, Hungary
- Chair: Balázs Fürjes
- NOC: Hungarian Olympic Committee (MOB)

Previous Games hosted
- None • Bid for 1916, 1920, 1936, 1944 and 1960

Decision
- Result: Candidacy withdrawn: Paris selected as the host of the 2024 Summer Olympics; Los Angeles selected as the host of the 2028 Summer Olympics

The Budapest bid for the 2024 Summer Olympics and Summer Paralympics was announced by the Hungarian Olympic Committee (Hungarian: Magyar Olimpiai Bizottság, MOB) on 11 November 2013, although organisers had been planning a bid since 2008. On 1 March 2017, Budapest withdrew its bid to host the 2024 Summer Olympics, leaving only Los Angeles and Paris in the race.

== Bid history ==
In February 2015, the MOB recommended that the bid plan go forward and with the General Assembly of Budapest began work on detailed cooperation for the Games. Then in January 2016, city authorities approved the plan for the potential Olympic Games locations.

The two other candidate cities were Paris in 2024 and Los Angeles in 2028. Hamburg pulled out of the contest in November 2015 and Rome in September 2016. Budapest pulled out of the contest in February 2017.

Water and movement are the key elements of the Budapest 2024 logo, the result of a national contest that involved almost 200 artists, children, graphic designers, and students. It was designed by Graphasel Design Studio in 2016. This was seen as fitting for an Olympic bid that featured the River Danube as a backdrop.

On 27 January 2016, the General Assembly of Budapest approved a list of potential venues.

Despite a seemingly low chance of succeeding with the bid Hungarian capital continued to move ahead with its campaign.

=== Aftermath ===
On 22 February 2017, Budapest announced that it would withdraw its bid to host the 2024 Summer Olympics, leaving only Los Angeles and Paris in the race. Paris hosted the 2024 Summer Olympics and Los Angeles will host the 2028 Summer Olympics.

In January 2021, Budapest resumed the discussion about a possible future Summer Olympics bid for 2032 and beyond. Despite this, the bid was not included and was later given to Brisbane.

== Previous bids ==
Budapest previously bid to host the 1916 Summer Olympics, 1920 Summer Olympics, 1936 Summer Olympics, 1944 Summer Olympics, and 1960 Summer Olympics, but lost to Berlin (cancelled due to World War I), Antwerp, Berlin, London (cancelled due to World War II), and Rome respectively.

== Venues ==
The 2024 Budapest Olympic bid sought to take advantage of the compactness of the city and co-location of venues along the River Danube and others around the Budapest area.

== Design ==
Graphasel Design Studio designed the logo for Budapest’s bid to host the 2024 Summer Olympics. Selected through an open competition announced by Design Terminal, the concept was chosen from nearly 200 entries.The design was inspired by the idea of renewal and sustainability, using segments derived from the five Olympic rings as modular elements that could be rearranged into different forms. Combining references to the Danube, Gellért Hill, sunshine and confetti, the logo aimed to express Budapest’s youthful energy, creativity and ever-changing character while maintaining a human-scale feel. Its playful adaptability was demonstrated through stop-motion animation, reflecting both the concept of renewal and Hungary’s tradition of craftsmanship.

== Budget ==
Based on publicly available information covering earlier estimates of potential costs of an Olympic Games in Budapest, and considering international past experiences, as well as the framework of the organisation of Games set by the Olympic Agenda 2020, the direct costs associated to a potential Budapest Olympics could be estimated at between HUF 500 billion to HUF 1,000 billion (US$1.8 billion to US$3.6 billion).

== Political commitment ==
Budapest's plan has seen opposition from the Együtt ('Together') party and two other minority parties in the General Assembly of Budapest. Some representatives on the council led calls for a public referendum on the issue but this came to an end in January 2016.

The Kúria, Hungary's supreme court, rejected a last-minute proposal that citizens should have the chance to have their say in a public vote.

Prime Minister Viktor Orbán's government had thrown its full support behind the Budapest bid. He had said in a speech: "Hungary believes that sport is always more important than any other political interest, and that is why it must never be diverted into the arena of political battles. The Government supports the bid." Orbán said, "We are not only competing for ourselves, but representing the whole region".

He said that over the past 120 years the Olympics have become a "passion" of the Hungarian people, and this may have developed "because the Olympic spirit represents such a pure form of freedom that was once rare here in Central Europe".

In January 2016, former Hungarian president Pál Schmitt was appointed President of the Budapest 2024 Summer Olympic and Paralympic Games Bid Committee.

According to the research institute Nézőpont Intézet, support among Hungarians for hosting the Olympics has risen from 40% in August 2014 to 53% by January 2016. However, according to a research made by Publicus, in August 2016 only 45% supported the bid.

=== Controversy and referendum petition ===
Most Hungarian opposition parties and civil organisations criticised the government for the bid, accusing it of corruption and of spending money on the Olympic Games instead of developing healthcare, education and transportation in Budapest.

In January 2017 a civil organisation called Momentum Movement started a petition to have a referendum for Budapest residents on whether or not to host the Summer Olympics in 2024. Several opposition parties, such as Lehet Más a Politika (LMP), Együtt, Párbeszéd Magyarországért (PM), Magyar Szocialista Párt (MSZP) and Demokratikus Koalíció (DK) joined the movement, as well as Magyar Kétfarkú Kutya Párt (MKKP), which also started a satiric poster campaign against the bid in February. A total of 138,527 signatures was required to be collected from Budapestians until 17 February 2017 to start a referendum that would be held in Budapest. Only residents of the capital city would be able to cast a valid vote.

266,151 signatures were submitted by Momentum on 17 February. Just three working days later, the government decided on 22 February that, instead of holding a referendum on the Olympic games, they would withdraw the bid. The government cited a lack of unity as the reason for their decision after heavy criticism from opposition parties for not organising a referendum.
