= 2024 European Parliament election in Hungary =

- 9 June 2024

All 21 Hungarian seats to the European Parliament
- Turnout: 59.46% (▲15.98 pp)
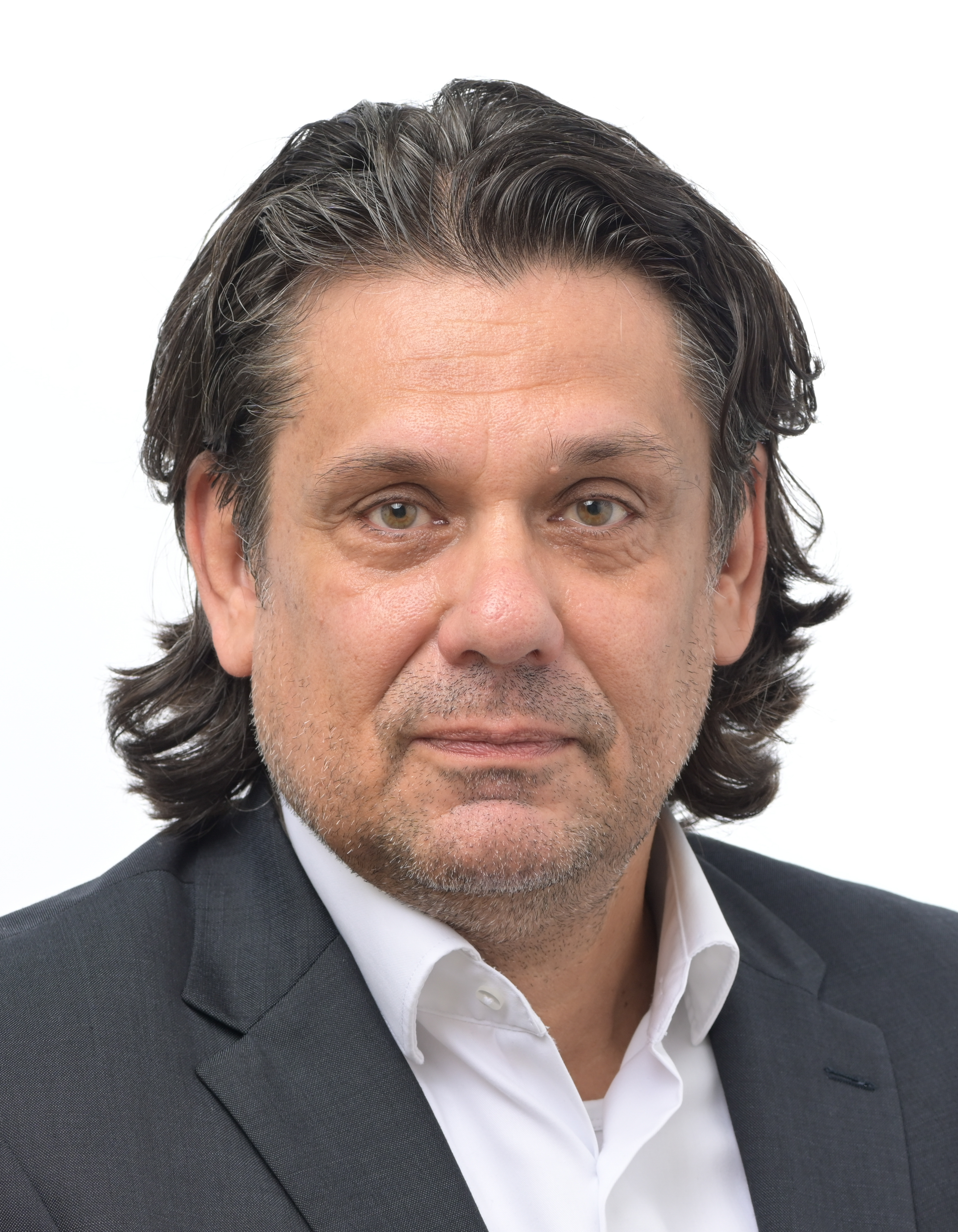

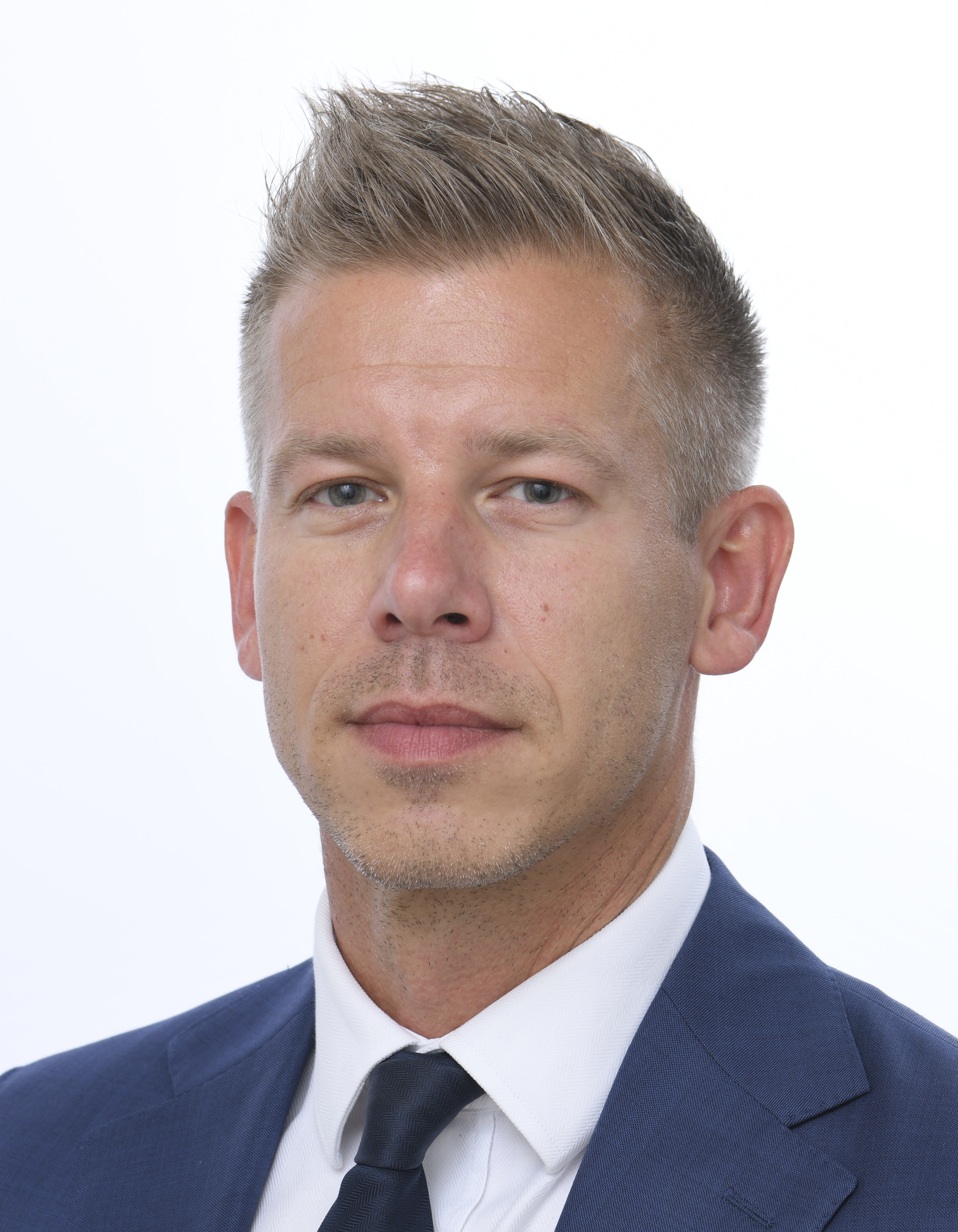

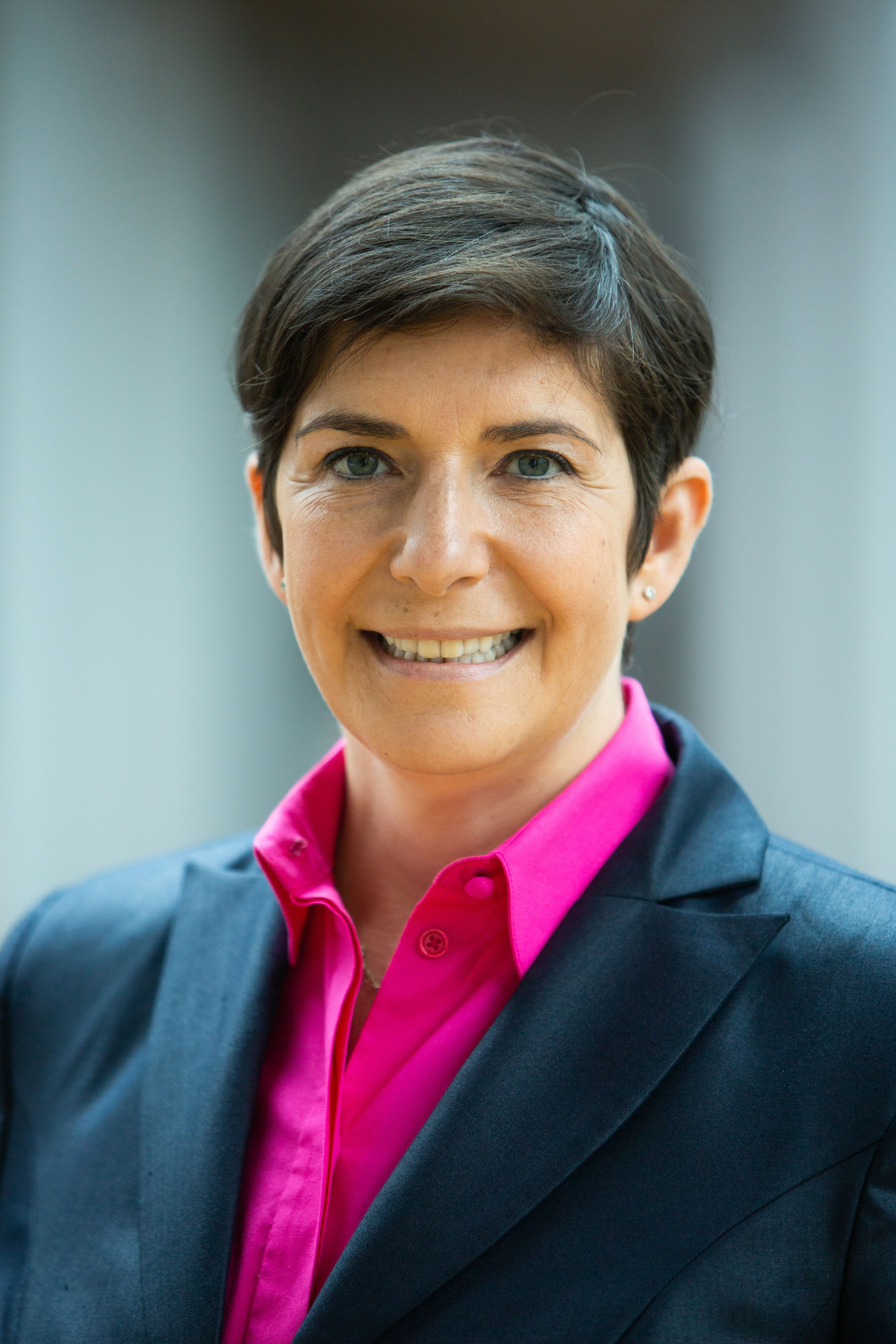

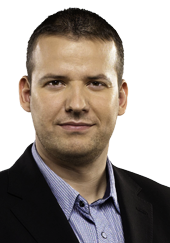
	First party	Second party
Leader	Tamás Deutsch	Péter Magyar
Party	Fidesz–KDNP	TISZA
Alliance	PfE	EPP
Last election	52.56%, 13 seats	Did not exist
Seats won	11	7
Seat change	▼2	New party
Popular vote	2,048,211	1,352,699
Percentage	44.82%	29.60%
Swing	▼7.74pp	New party
	Third party	Fourth party
Leader	Klára Dobrev	László Toroczkai
Party	DK–MSZP–Párbeszéd	MH
Alliance	S&D; Greens/EFA	ESN
Last election	22.66%, 5 seats	3.29%, 0 seats
Seats won	2	1
Seat change	▼3	▲1
Popular vote	367,162	306,404
Percentage	8.03%	6.71%
Swing	▼14.63pp	▲3.42pp
- Results of the election by county.

The 2024 European Parliament elections in Hungary were held on 9 June 2024 as part of the 2024 European Parliament election. This was the first European election to take place after Brexit and on the same day as local elections.

This was the first nationwide election contested by the Tisza Party under Péter Magyar, who became the most popular opposition figure to then-Prime Minister Viktor Orbán since the Novák scandal broke in February 2024. Though the Fidesz–KDNP alliance of then Prime Minister Viktor Orbán won the election, Tisza won the largest share of any non-Fidesz party in a nationwide election since 2010, while Fidesz won its lowest share in a European election since Hungary joined the European Union.

As of 2026, this is the most recent nationwide election won by Fidesz–KDNP, which would lose the 2026 Hungarian parliamentary election to the Tisza Party.

== Background ==
The European Parliament considers Hungary a "hybrid regime of electoral autocracy" since 2022.

== Electoral system ==
Hungary uses closed lists and the D'Hondt method to elect seats to the European Parliament, with a 5% threshold.

== Running parties and candidates ==
Running parties

Party		Main ideology	Lead Candidate	European party	EP Group	2019 result	
Party		Main ideology	Lead Candidate	European party	EP Group	Votes (%)	Seats
Fidesz–KDNP	Fidesz – Hungarian Civic Alliance; Christian Democratic People's Party	National conservatism Right-wing populism Soft Euroscepticism	Tamás Deutsch	none (Fidesz); EPP (KDNP)	PfE	52.56	13
DK–MSZP–Párbeszéd	Democratic Coalition; Hungarian Socialist Party; Dialogue – The Greens' Party	Social liberalism Social democracy Green politics	Klára Dobrev	PES (DK, MSZP); EGP (P)	S&D (DK, MSZP); Greens/EFA(P)	22.66	5
Momentum	Momentum Movement	Liberalism	Anna Donáth	ALDE	Renew	9.93	2
Jobbik	Jobbik – Conservatives	Conservatism	Péter Róna	ECPM	none	6.34	1
MH	Our Homeland Movement	Ultranationalism; Hard Euroscepticism	László Toroczkai	none	Europe of Sovereign Nations	3.29	0
MKKP	Hungarian Two-Tailed Dog Party	Social liberalism Political satire	Marietta Le	PPEU	Greens/EFA	2.62	0
LMP	LMP – Hungary's Green Party	Syncretic politics Green politics	Péter Ungár	EGP (suspended)	none	2.18	0
TISZA	TISZA – Respect and Freedom Party	Conservatism; Populism; Pro-Europeanism	Péter Magyar	none	none	did not exist	
2RK	Second Reform Era Party	Centrism	Gábor Vona	none	none	did not exist	
MMN	Everybody's Hungary People's Party	Liberal conservatism	Péter Márki-Zay	none	none	did not exist	
MEMO	Solution Movement	Digitalization	Viktor Huszár	none	none	did not exist	

Full party lists

	Fidesz–KDNP	DK–MSZP–Párbeszéd	Momentum	Jobbik	MH	MKKP	LMP	TISZA	2RK	MMN	MEMO
1.	Tamás Deutsch	Klára Dobrev	Anna Donáth	Péter Róna	László Toroczkai	Marietta Le	Péter Ungár	Péter Magyar	Gábor Vona	Péter Márki-Zay	Viktor Huszár
2.	Kinga Gál	Csaba Molnár	Katalin Cseh	Márton Gyöngyösi	Dóra Dúró	Katalin Törley	Erzsébet Schmuck	Dóra Dávid	Emese Pekárné Farkas	Botond Szalma	Dóra Karl
3.	András Gyürk	Ágnes Vadai	Tamás Győző Deli	Zoltán Balczó	Zsuzsanna Borvendég	Veronika Juhász	Örs Tetlák	Zoltán Tarr	Balázs Búzás	Tibor Bana	Dániel László Bogó
4.	Balázs Győrffy	Sándor Rónai	Viktória Vajda	Anita Kvárik	Szilveszter Kispalkó	Imre Tóth	Máté Kanász-Nagy	András Kulja	Adrián Száki	Anita Putz	Piroska Paksi
5.	György Hölvényi	Kata Tüttő	Dániel Berg	Róbert Dudás	József Árgyelán	András Becker	Krisztina Hohn	Eszter Lakos	Gábor Tóth	Tamás Mellár	Norbert Szilágyi
6.	Pál Szekeres	Zsolt Gréczy	Benedek Farkas	László György Lukács	Andreas Héjj	András Ecsedi-Derdák	János Kendernay	Gabriella Gerzsenyi	Andrásné Szilvási	Péter Pál Ember	Ferenc Horváth
7.	Viktória Ferenc	Richárd Barabás	Bedő Erik	Bence Nagy	Gyula Popély	Balázs Sándor	Gábor Hanák	Kinga Kollár	Viktor Póka	Balázs Kiss	Mihály Tóth
8.	Annamária Vicsek	Péter Heil	Máté Urfi	Béla Adorján	Patrik Orosz	Zakota Tamás	Dorottya Szabolcs	Csaba Bogdán	Árpád Burány	Fanni Kecskés	
9.	Enikő Győri	Zita Gurmai	Levente Takács	Attila Fazekas	Ágnes Szent-Iványi	Richárd Szin	Viktor D'Elia	Viktor Weisz	Miklós Orbán		
10.	András László	Lajos Oláh	Evelin Hornyák	Péter Balassa	Mihály Földesi		Mónika Andrasek	Dániel Molnár	Lívia Győri-Nagy		
11.	Ernő Schaller-Baross	Krisztián Kocsis	Barnabás Kádár	Réka Lakatos	András Grundtner		László Perneczky	Andrea Anna Bujdosó	Marcell Imre		
12.	Boglárka Ballester-Bólya	Balázs Barkóczi	Anna Mária Benza	Zoltán Magyar	János Lantos		András Szabó	Ildikó Éva Sopov	Pál Ágoston		
13.	Bernadett Petri	Gábor Harangozó	Mátyás Szilvási	Rajmund Baucsek	Zsuzsanna Fiszter		Zoltán Ságodi		Márton Tóth		
14.	Barbara Hegedűs	László Sebián-Petrovszki	Zsuzsanna Nagy	Miklós Vincze	Attila László		Balázs Haladi-Bús		Róbert Oláh		
15.	Ádám Kavecsánszki	Tímea Szabó	Alexandra Nikoletta Hulse	Krisztián Berta	Balázs Éberling				Norbert Riczu		
16.	Hajnalka Juhász	László Andor	Péter Sajószegi	Dénes Szarka	Csaba Binder				József Dakó		
17.	Ádám Kósa	Gergely Arató	Koppány Bendegúz Szarvas		Attila Vidó				Eszter Judit Kiss		
18.	Dóra Hidas	Levente Dávid Bazin	György Juhász		Csongor Vékony				Martin Zsolt Gillich		
19.	Edina Tóth	Olga Kálmán	András Csaba Horváth		Jenő Páli				Csanád Terdik		
20.	Ágnes Zsófia Magyar	Gábor Erőss	Gábor Baranyi		Barna Bartha				Balázs Szőke		
21.	Gábor Tordai-Lejko	Mátyás Eörsi	Dávid Bedő		Tamás Varga				Klára Simon		

=== MEPs not standing for re-election ===
Name	Party	Date announced	Source
István Ujhelyi	Opportunity Community	2 June 2023	
László Trócsányi	Fidesz	22 January 2024	
Andor Deli	Fidesz	4 April 2024	
Balázs Hidvéghi	Fidesz	4 April 2024	
Andrea Bocskor	Fidesz	4 April 2024	
Lívia Járóka	Fidesz	4 April 2024	
Attila Ara-Kovács	Democratic Coalition	25 April 2024	

== Campaign ==
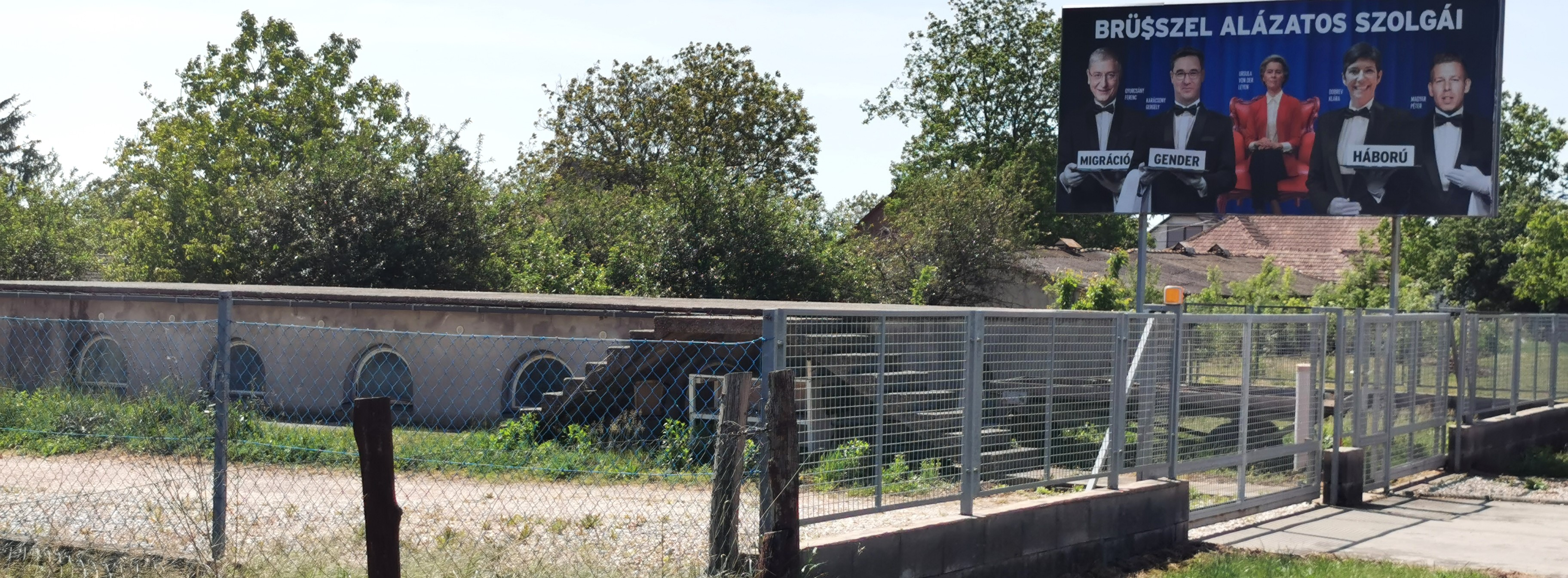
Election poster titled "Bru$sels's humble servants", depicts opposition politicians Gyurcsány, Karácsony, Dobrev, and Magyar as butlers of Ursula von der Leyen, offering migration, gender, and war.

=== Debates ===
Location	Date	Participants										
Location	Date	Fidesz–KDNP	DK–MSZP–Párbeszéd	TISZA	Momentum	MH	MKKP	Jobbik	LMP	MMN	2RK	MEMO
Partizán	2024-05-17	X mark	check	X mark	check	check	check	not invited				
M1	2024-05-30	check	check	check	check	check	check	check	check	check	check	check
ATV	2024-06-01	X mark	check	X mark	check	check	check	not invited				

== Opinion polling ==
Polling firm	Fieldwork date	Sample size	Fidesz–KDNP PfE	Momentum Renew	DK S&D	MSZP S&D	Párbeszéd G/EFA	LMP G/EFA	Jobbik NI	MMN EPP	MH ESN	MKKP G/EFA	MEMO EPP	NP NI	2RK NI	TISZA EPP	Other	Lead
2024 election	9 June 2024	–	44.8	3.7	8			0.8	1	0.6	6.7	3.6	0.4	–	0.7	29.6	0.1	15.2
21 Kutatóközpont	6–8 Jun 2024	1,000	44	3	8			–	–	1	7	4	–	–	1	32	–	12
Publicus	3–5 June 2024	1,001	43	4	15			1	2	–	5	4	–	–	–	25	1	18
Medián	27-29 May 2024	1,000	48	5	9			0	1	1	6	2	–	–	1	29	–	19
IDEA	20–29 May 2024	1,500	44	4	12			0	0	1	5	4	–	–	2	26	2	18
Társadalomkutató	May 2024	4,000	51	1	8			2	1	1	4	5	–	–	1	25	–	26
Real-PR 93	27-29 May 2024	1,000	45	1	10			–	1	1	5	7	1	–	2	28	–	17
Alapjogokért Központ	22-24 May 2024	1,000	47	2	8			1	1	1	6	6	1	–	1	26	–	21
Századvég	20-28 May 2024	1,000	45	3	10			1	1	1	6	9	–	–	1	23	–	22
Nézőpont	20-22 May 2024	1,000	47	1	9			1	1	1	7	7	1	–	1	24	–	23
Závecz Research	2–10 May 2024	1,000	39	4	17			1	1	2	6	3	–	–	1	26	0	13
IDEA	25 Apr–4 May 2024	1,500	40	4	17			0	1	1	4	5	–	2	3	21	2	19
Nézőpont	29 Apr – 2 May 2024	1,000	48	1	12			1	1	1	5	7	–	0	3	21	–	27
Publicus	26–30 Apr 2024	1,000	42	3	24			1	1	–	4	2	–	–	–	23	–	18
Medián	26–29 Apr 2024	1,000	45	4	9			1	1	2	4	6	–	1	2	25	–	20
Iránytű	17–19 Apr 2024	1,073	50	3	10			–	1	–	3	4	–	–	2	26	1	24
Iránytű	9–12 Apr 2024	1,073	53	3	9			–	2	–	6	4	–	–	1	20	2	33
Závecz Research	4–11 Apr 2024	1,000	33	7	26			3	1	–	8	5	–	–	–	14	3	7
Nézőpont	2–4 Apr 2024	1,000	47	4	13			1	1	1	6	11	–	2	2	13	2	34
Ipsos	23 Feb–5 Mar 2024	1,025	47.6	7.2	16.5	–	–	2.6	2.8	3.0	9.6	4.2	2.0	–	–	–	4.7	31.1
Nézőpont	26–28 Feb 2024	1,000	47	7	14	2	2	2	2	4	8	8	–	1; 0	4; 0	–	–	33
21 Kutatóközpont	22–26 Feb 2024	1,200	44	9	18	2	1	2	3	3	7	8	–	1	2	–	–	26 (Note: without leaders)
21 Kutatóközpont	22–26 Feb 2024	1,200	44	9	17	1	1	3	2	5	5	6	–	3	3	–	–	27 (Note: with leaders)
Republikon	Jun 2023	–	46	7	19	4	6		6	–	9	4	–	–	–	–	–	27
Nézőpont	15–17 May 2023	1,000	51	9	16	2	1	3	5	–	6	3	–	–	–	–	4	35
Závecz Research	28 Apr–5 May 2023	1,000	46	8	19	6	2	4	6	–	7	3	–	–	–	–	–	27
Nézőpont	2–4 Jan 2023	1,000	56	6	14	2	1	3	2	6	–	4	–	–	–	–	6	42
2022 parliamentary election	3 Apr 2022	–	54.1	34.4							5.9	3.3	1.0	–	–	–	1.3	19.7
2019 election	26 May 2019	–	52.6	9.9	16.1	6.6		2.2	6.3	–	3.3	2.6	–	–	–	–	0.4	36.5

== Results ==
=== Turnout ===
Time	Votes	% Turnout	±% from 2019
7:00	148 427	1,88%	▲0.4pp
9:00	785 546	9,98%	▲2.2pp
11:00	1 802 332	22,89%	▲5.73pp
13:00	2 609 173	33,14%	▲9.13pp
15:00	3 310 686	42,04%	▲11.52pp
17:00	3 991 444	50,69%	▲13.63pp
18:30	4 416 794	56,09%	▲14.35pp
Overall	4 640 398	59,46%	▲15.98pp

=== Results ===
Party	Votes	%	Seats	+/–
Fidesz–KDNP	2,048,211	44.82	11	–2
Respect and Freedom Party	1,352,699	29.60	7	New
DK–MSZP–Dialogue	367,162	8.03	2	–3
Our Homeland Movement	306,404	6.71	1	+1
Momentum Movement	169,082	3.70	0	–2
Hungarian Two-Tailed Dog Party	163,960	3.59	0	0
Jobbik – Conservatives	45,404	0.99	0	–1
LMP – Hungary's Green Party	39,646	0.87	0	0
Second Reform Era Party	30,961	0.68	0	New
Everybody's Hungary People's Party	29,285	0.64	0	New
Solution Movement	16,806	0.37	0	New
Total	4,569,620	100.00	21	0
Valid votes	4,569,620	98.58		
Invalid/blank votes	65,949	1.42		
Total votes	4,635,569	100.00		
Registered voters/turnout	7,655,344	60.55		
Source: Nemzeti Választási Iroda

=== Results by county and in the diaspora ===
County	Fidesz–KDNP	TISZA	DK–MSZP–Párbeszéd	MH	Momentum	MKKP	Jobbik	LMP	2RK	MMN	MEMO	Turnout
Bács-Kiskun	48.36	28.60	6.25	8.66	2.28	2.91	0.85	0.60	0.55	0.54	0.40	55,10%
Baranya	46.59	27.14	9.39	6.31	3.00	3.60	1.16	1.14	0.64	0.58	0.45	59,35%
Békés	45.57	29.82	7.23	8.67	2.32	2.63	1.26	0.63	0.64	0.82	0.41	56,16%
Borsod-Abaúj-Zemplén	48.77	27.30	7.97	7.57	2.13	2.32	1.77	0.64	0.52	0.55	0.46	58,13%
Budapest	33.12	32.81	12.30	4.46	7.89	5.92	0.40	1.39	0.91	0.50	0.32	63,98%
Csongrád-Csanád	38.32	31.71	7.84	8.52	3.61	4.03	0.67	0.62	0.60	3.76	0.33	58,71%
Fejér	45.88	29.21	7.14	7.42	3.00	3.83	1.18	0.70	0.68	0.52	0.43	58,83%
Győr-Moson-Sopron	48.02	30.55	5.97	6.58	2.66	3.07	0.86	0.90	0.61	0.44	0.37	62,66%
Hajdú-Bihar	48.13	30.28	5.89	7.46	2.94	2.54	0.83	0.61	0.59	0.45	0.29	55,06%
Heves	47.13	28.74	7.41	7.34	2.53	2.42	2.04	0.50	1.13	0.45	0.32	59,80%
Jász-Nagykun-Szolnok	47.16	29.69	7.21	6.91	1.94	2.23	2.35	1.16	0.58	0.50	0.28	55,00%
Komárom-Esztergom	42.65	31.74	8.79	7.08	2.81	3.46	0.93	0.83	0.78	0.48	0.44	56,06%
Nógrád	51.60	24.43	8.04	8.85	1.66	2.30	1.07	0.75	0.49	0.47	0.35	59,56%
Pest	41.38	32.09	7.10	7.22	4.42	4.50	0.64	0.88	0.80	0.55	0.42	58,98%
Somogy	50.18	27.19	7.85	6.80	1.86	2.40	1.62	0.66	0.54	0.49	0.41	60,25%
Szabolcs-Szatmár-Bereg	54.47	26.80	6.33	6.36	1.30	1.61	1.37	0.52	0.41	0.44	0.39	59,58%
Tolna	51.94	24.94	7.02	7.75	2.30	2.57	1.21	0.87	0.52	0.51	0.38	58,98%
Vas	51.30	26.73	7.15	5.91	2.70	2.98	0.81	0.91	0.55	0.59	0.37	64,76%
Veszprém	45.56	29.28	8.12	6.94	2.74	3.49	1.32	1.07	0.69	0.46	0.34	61,36%
Zala	49.83	28.19	7.14	6.74	2.83	2.52	0.99	0.53	0.46	0.43	0.32	62,16%
Foreign representations	18.86	50.82	3.77	2.26	12.08	9.65	0.20	0.58	1.07	0.54	0.16	-
Diaspora	90.03	4.42	0.83	1.97	0.90	0.95	0.15	0.29	0.11	0.21	0.14	-
Total	44.82	29.60	8.03	6.71	3.70	3.59	0.99	0.87	0.68	0.64	0.37	59,46%

=== Results by settlement size ===
Settlement size	Fidesz–KDNP	TISZA	DK–MSZP–Párbeszéd	MH
Budapest	33.1	32.8	12.3	4.5
Cities with county rights	38.8	35.1	9.2	6.1
20,000–	39.9	34.0	8.4	7.0
10,000–20,000	44.5	30.9	7.5	7.6
5,000–10,000	47.8	28.7	6.8	7.6
3,000–5,000	49.4	27.3	6.3	7.9
1,000–3,000	53.6	24.3	5.8	8.0
0–1,000	58.3	20.4	5.5	7.8

== See also ==
- 2024 Hungarian local elections, held simultaneously on the same day
- 2026 Hungarian parliamentary election, held two years later
