= Péter Jakab =

Hungarian politician

Péter Jakab MP
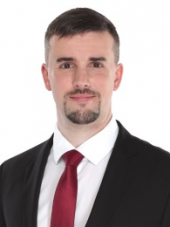

President of Jobbik
- In office 25 January 2020 – 8 June 2022
- Preceded by: Tamás Sneider
- Succeeded by: Anita Potocskáné Kőrösi (acting)

Member of the National Assembly
- In office 8 May 2018 – 9 May 2026

Personal details
- Born: Péter Dénes Jakab; 16 August 1980 (age 45) Miskolc, Hungary
- Party: Jobbik (2009–2022); On the People's Side (2023–present)
- Children: 3
- Profession: Politician

Péter Dénes Jakab (born 16 August 1980) is a Hungarian politician and member of the National Assembly. He served as president of the right-wing Jobbik between January 2020 and June 2022. He had been the parliamentary group leader of Jobbik from July 2019 to July 2022. He was the deputy leader of the parliamentary group from February to June in 2019. He was elected Member of Parliament in the 2018 parliamentary election. He was a Member of the House Committee on Legislation from 2018 to 2019 and he was the Vice Chairman of the Committee on Justice in 2019 in the National Assembly.

== Early life ==
Jakab was born in Miskolc on 16 August 1980. He has always openly talked about his Jewish origin. His great-grandfather was murdered in Auschwitz. His grandmother converted to Christianity in 1925 and raised 11 children in Mezőtúr. Jakab graduated in 1998 at the Faculty of Biology of Diósgyőri High School. He graduated from the University of Miskolc in 2004. He was a history teacher in Buda Secondary School from 2004 to 2007. He worked as a boarding school teacher from 2008 to 2009 at the secondary and vocational boarding school in Miskolc. From 2009 to 2010, he was history teacher in Kalyi Jag Roma Minority Secondary and Vocational School in Miskolc. Due to his political activity and party affiliation, Jakab was fired from his teaching post. Jakab filed a labor lawsuit, but lost it, the court ruled that "mentioning the name of Jobbik to the Gypsies is frightening" in July 2011.

== Political career ==
He had been the President of Jobbik's Miskolc group since 2009. In 2010, he was the councilman in Miskolc City Council and a member of the City Council's Legal and Public Security Committee. He has worked as Jobbik's Borsod-Abaúj-Zemplén County Vice President since 2012. In 2014 he was the mayoral candidate for Miskolc in the 2014 municipal elections. He got 20.53% of the votes, finishing third behind incumbent mayor Ákos Kriza (42.37%) and former city Police Chief Albert Pásztor (33.26%). In September 2016, Jakab was appointed Jobbik's spokesman.

He was Jobbik's MP candidate in Constituency I of Borsod-Abaúj-Zemplén County at the 2018 Hungarian national elections. He got 20597 votes, which was 127 less than Fidesz' Katalin Csöbör's, making it the closest single-member constituency race in these elections.

After he was elected Member of Parliament he became the party's deputy leader of the parliamentary group in January 2019, then group leader after Márton Gyöngyösi was elected as MEP.

Since Jobbik's board collectively resigned due to the poor results achieved at the 2019 European Parliament election, he expressed his interest to run for the presidential seat. Interviewed by ATV's Straight Talk show on 29 August 2019, Péter Jakab announced his candidacy for Jobbik's presidential seat at the party's National Congress in September. Jakab later withdrew because the party did not support his idea in the Electoral Board meeting to extend the board's mandate in such a way that it would only expire after the 2022 national elections. He did not run in the 2019 municipal election, he endorsed the joint opposition candidate, Pál Veres.

=== Leader of Jobbik ===
On 25 January 2020, Péter Jakab was elected for president in Jobbik. He received more than 87 percent of the votes. On 30 June 2020, Jakab and Koloman Brenner, a representative of the party's strategic council, defined the party's direction and ideology, that is, Jobbik's Declaration of Principles. The party defined itself as a national, Christian, conservative, center-right, socially sensitive people's party in the document, which mentions the creation of a welfare Hungary and a civil society as one of its goals. Jakab said that his election ended Jobbik's process to become a people's party from a far-right organization. The document defines Jobbik as the only people's party in Hungary. According to Jakab's statement, the party has arrived at the political centre, offering the opportunity for freedom and prosperity to all decent Hungarians, especially those who have not received it in the last three decades.

After his election, Jakab rapidly ousted far-right elements from the party and centralized the party leadership, pushing party rivals to the periphery. Several prominent members left Jobbik in the subsequent months, including János Bencsik, István Szávay, Tibor Bana, former leader Tamás Sneider, Gergely Farkas and Ádám Mirkóczki, while Andrea Varga-Damm was expelled from the party. Under the leadership of Jakab, Jobbik joined the electoral alliance of six opposition parties on 15 November 2020 in order to jointly contest the 2022 parliamentary election against the ruling party Fidesz.

On 25 January 2021, Péter Jakab announced he would run in the primary election as candidate for Prime Minister. Jakab started his campaign very early, demonstrating he is one among ordinary people (he was accused of populism by both pro-government and independent media when he showed that he eats parizer and kifli before the parliamentary session). In the spring of the year, many pollsters rated him as the most likely and popular candidate within the united opposition. Simultaneously, Jakab became known for his outspoken and offensive tone in parliamentary sessions during the Questions to the Prime Minister Viktor Orbán. Therefore, Jakab was fined several times by legislative speaker László Kövér and the office of the national assembly. During the selection process of the candidates, Jobbik entered into an alliance with the Democratic Coalition (DK), the two parties supported each other's candidate in a number of places during the primary, despite the past political and ideological differences. In the first round of the prime ministerial primary, Jakab – who though was featured as a front-runner in opinion polls – came to only the fourth place (14.08%) and was eliminated. Jakab won only four constituencies. Nevertheless, Jobbik gained 29 mandates, the second most after the Democratic Coalition. Analysts said Jakab started the campaign too early, which suffocated in the autumn, the politician could not change the pace and the image of the "ordinary man" could not be turned into votes. Between the two rounds, Jakab opposed the cooperation negotiations between Gergely Karácsony and Péter Márki-Zay, who finished second and third, respectively, which aimed to defeat Klára Dobrev, winner of the first round. He said he could support it if two candidates came together to increase the number of opposition voters. "But if the two of you get together so that the third doesn't win, all they do is do wounds", he added. Jakab refused to support any candidates (Dobrev and Márki-Zay) in the second round, but he repeatedly criticized some of the latter candidate's actions, which some attributed to the tacit endorsement of Klára Dobrev and the former political pact between Jobbik and DK. After the victory of Márki-Zay in the primary, Jakab assured the winner of his support.

The United for Hungary alliance suffered a heavy defeat against the ruling party Fidesz in the 2022 parliamentary election. A major factor was, according to analysts, that hundreds of thousands of former Jobbik voters turned away from the party and supported far-right Our Homeland Movement or did not go to the polls. No individual candidate of the Jobbik was able to win his constituency and the party received only 10 MPs in the new parliament via the joint national list. Márki-Zay shared this assessment, admitting that the united opposition may have lost up to "two thirds" of Jobbik voters.

Immediately after the disclosure of results, Jakab blamed Márki-Zay for the defeat, claiming that the prime-minister-candidate "received an army of six opposition parties in October and a huge advantage. This eventually turned into a massive defeat, with two-thirds going to Fidesz". Despite the failure, Jakab did not resign from the party leadership and was re-elected leader of the party's parliamentary group too. Jakab was re-elected president of the Jobbik on 7 May 2022 with the 71.4 percent of the vote, defeating his rival János Stummer. A month later, on 8 June 2022, Péter Jakab resigned from Jobbik's presidency following internal disputes between him and the presidency in the party. He was replaced as leader of the parliamentary group too on 15 July 2022.

=== On the People's Side ===
On 20 August 2022, Péter Jakab announced the formation of his own political movement named "On the People's Side" (Hungarian: "A Nép Pártján"). On 20 August 2023, the movement officially became a party. The party planned to run in the 2024 European Parliament election. However, the National Election Office (NVI) found 400 recommendation forms that were invalidated, so the 20,000 recommendation forms required for the run were not met. For this reason, the party was not allowed to run in the election.

Jakab ran as a candidate of the left-wing Democratic Coalition (DK) in Miskolc (Borsod-Abaúj-Zemplén County 1st constituency) during the 2026 Hungarian parliamentary election, but he lost.

== Personal life ==
He is divorced and has three children.

== See also ==
- Csanád Szegedi

National Assembly of Hungary
Preceded by Márton Gyöngyösi	Leader of the Jobbik parliamentary group 2019–2022	Succeeded by László György Lukács
Party political offices
Preceded by Tamás Sneider	President of Jobbik; 2020–2022	Succeeded by Anita Potocskáné Kőrösi (acting)
