= Shadow Cabinet of Klára Dobrev =

2022–24 Hungarian opposition group

Dobrev Shadow Cabinet
- Shadow Cabinet of Hungary
- 2022 – 2024
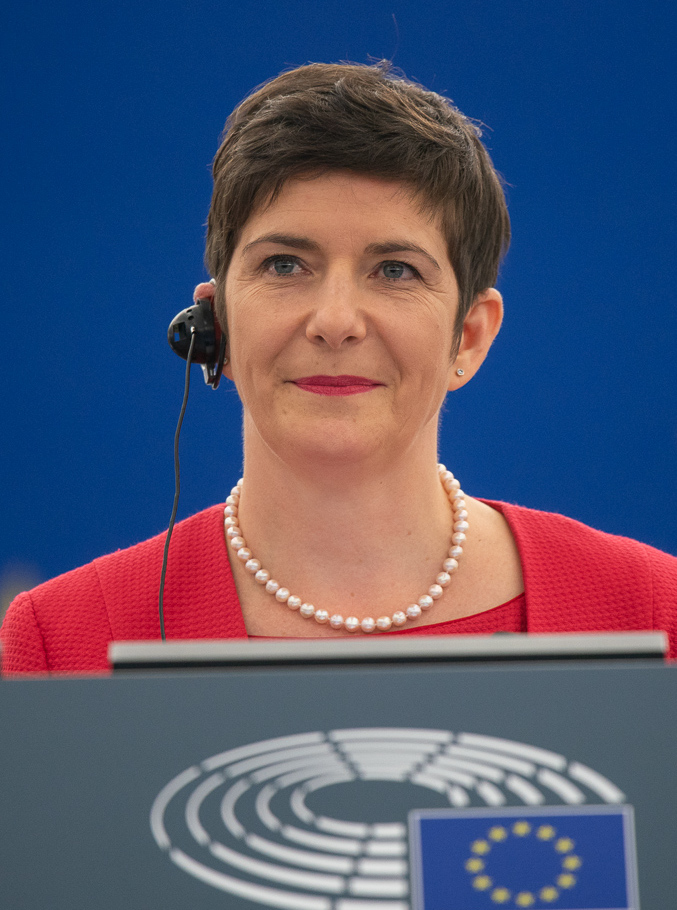
- Klára Dobrev Shadow Prime Minister
- Date formed: 16 September 2022
- Date dissolved: 10 June 2024

People and organisations
- Shadow Prime Minister: Klára Dobrev
- Shadow Deputy Prime Minister: Csaba Molnár
- Prime Minister being shadowed: Viktor Orbán (Fifth Orbán Government)
- Total no. of members: 17
- Member party: Democratic Coalition
- Status in legislature: Opposition 15 / 199 (8%)

History
- Legislature terms: 2022–2026 Hungarian parliament

The Dobrev Shadow Cabinet was a shadow cabinet in Hungary formed by the Democratic Coalition (DK) party in autumn 2022. According to their statement, its purpose was to build a credible alternative to the incumbent Fifth Orbán Government.

== History ==
On September 16, 2022, the Democratic Coalition announced that it would form a shadow cabinet. The party's presidency asked Klára Dobrev to lead it, and she accepted the request.

On September 19, 2022, Klára Dobrev introduced the 16 members of her shadow cabinet.

Following the party's poor performance (8%) in the 2024 European Parliament election in Hungary on June 9, Klára Dobrev announced the dissolution of the shadow cabinet the next day, on June 10, 2024.

== Members ==
At its formation, the shadow cabinet had 16 members.

Portfolio	Shadow Minister	Party
Shadow Prime Minister	Klára Dobrev	Democratic Coalition
Shadow Deputy Prime Minister	Csaba Molnár	Democratic Coalition
Shadow Minister of Finance	Zoltán Bodnár	Independent
Shadow Minister of Foreign Affairs	Sándor Rónai	Democratic Coalition
Shadow Minister for Government Program	Gergely Arató	Democratic Coalition
Shadow Minister of Interior	Géza Mustó	Democratic Coalition
Shadow Minister for Wages and Labor	Ferenc Varga	Democratic Coalition
Shadow Minister of Health	Zoltán Komáromi	Democratic Coalition
Shadow Minister for Energy and Utility Affairs	László Varju	Democratic Coalition
Shadow Minister of Economy	Ferenc Dávid	Democratic Coalition
Shadow Minister of Defense	Ágnes Vadai	Democratic Coalition
Shadow Minister for Innovation and Artificial Intelligence	Lajos Oláh	Democratic Coalition
Shadow Minister of Agriculture	Szilveszter Benedek	Democratic Coalition
Shadow Minister of Education and Culture	Balázs Barkóczi	Democratic Coalition
Shadow Minister of Local Government	Sándor Szaniszló	Democratic Coalition
Shadow Minister of Environment and Climate Affairs	Olivio Kocsis-Cake	Democratic Coalition
Shadow Minister of Social Affairs and Pensions	Erzsébet Gy. Németh	Democratic Coalition

=== Additional associated politicians ===
Portfolio	Name	Party
Chief Advisor for Rural Municipal Affairs	Péter Szitka	Hungarian Socialist Party
Spokesperson of the Shadow Cabinet	Olga Kálmán	Democratic Coalition
Romani Affairs Advisor	Marietta Herfort	Independent
