= Annamária Vicsek =

Serbian-Hungarian politician (born 1973)

Annamária Vicsek MEP
- Анамарија Вичек
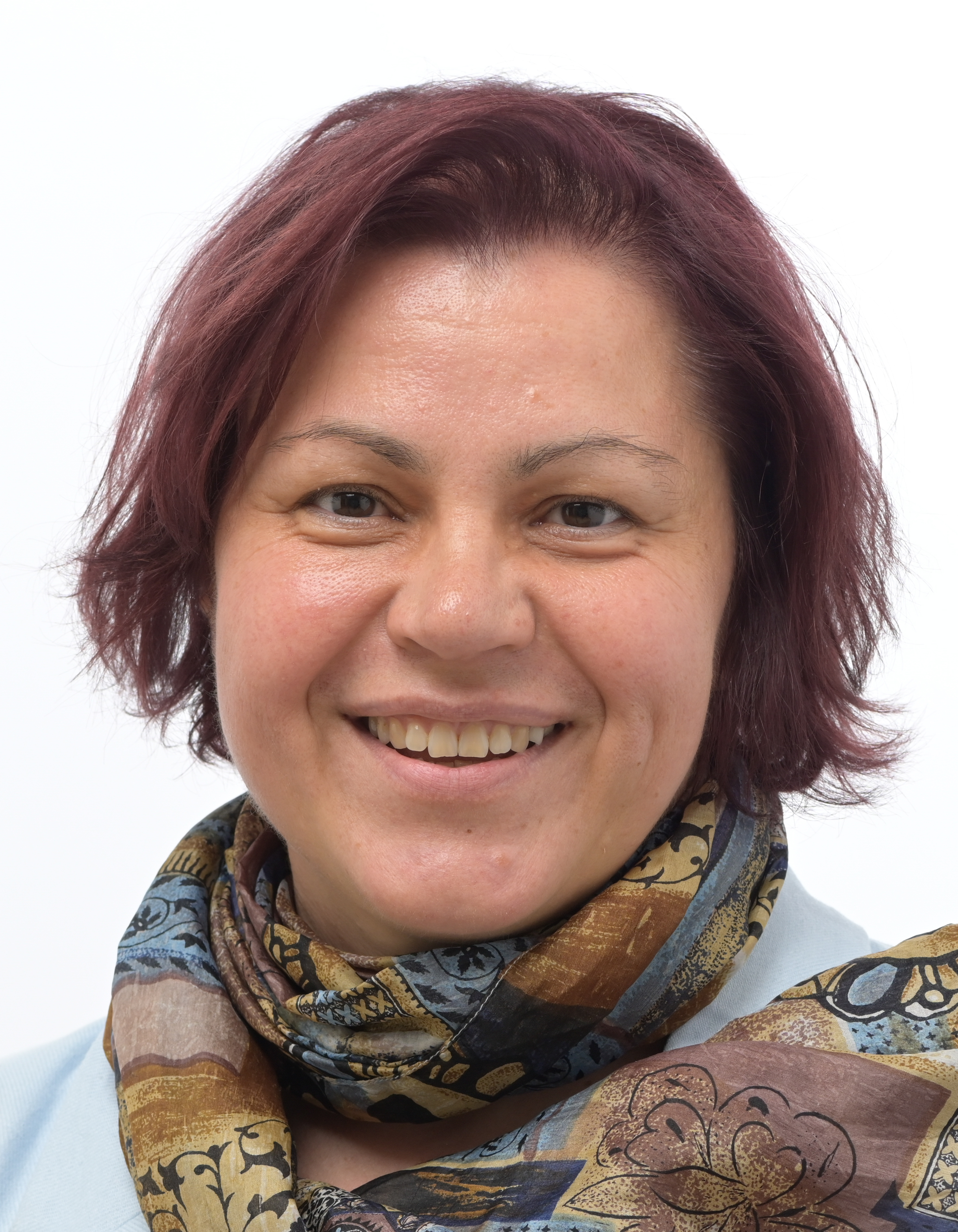
- Official portrait, 2024

Member of the European Parliament for Hungary
- Incumbent
- Assumed office 16 July 2024

Member of the National Assembly of the Republic of Serbia
- In office 3 August 2020 – 27 November 2020
- In office 16 April 2014 – 3 June 2016

Personal details
- Born: 9 February 1973 (age 53) Subotica, SAP Vojvodina, SR Serbia, SFR Yugoslavia
- Party: VMSZ (Serbia); Fidesz (Hungary)
- Education: Eötvös Loránd University; University of Novi Sad

Annamária Vicsek (Serbian: Анамарија Вичек, romanized: Anamarija Viček; born 9 February 1973) is a Serbian politician from the country's Hungarian community. She has been a member of the European Parliament since July 2024, serving with Hungary's national delegation as a member of Fidesz. She previously served two terms in the Serbian national assembly and was a secretary of state in Serbia's education ministry from 2016 to 2024. In Serbian politics, Vicsek is a member of the Alliance of Vojvodina Hungarians (VMSZ), which is aligned with Fidesz.

== Early life and career ==
Vicsek was born in Subotica, in what was then the Socialist Autonomous Province of Vojvodina in the Socialist Republic of Serbia, Socialist Federal Republic of Yugoslavia. She received her primary and secondary school education in Novi Sad, graduated from the Bárczi Gusztáv Faculty of Special Needs Education in Budapest, and later took post-graduate studies at Eötvös Loránd University. In 2008, she received a master's degree in pedagogy from the University of Novi Sad. She is a speech therapist and development instructor and has designed a number of continuing education programs inclusive of children with special needs. Since 2010, she has led the developmental department at the Pedagogical Institute of Vojvodina in Novi Sad.

== Politician ==
=== Serbia ===
Vicsek joined the VMSZ in 2008 and has served on the presidency of its Novi Sad city board. She was given the sixth position on the party's electoral list in the 2012 Serbian parliamentary election and narrowly missed election when the list won five seats. She received the same position in the 2014 parliamentary election and was elected to her first term when the list won six seats.

The Serbian Progressive Party (SNS) won a majority government in the 2014 election, and the VMSZ afterward supported the administration in the assembly. Vicsek was a member of the education committee, (Note: Formally known as the Committee on Education, Science, Technological Development, and the Information Society.) the labour committee, (Note: Formally known as the Committee on Labour, Social Issues, Social Inclusion, and Poverty Reduction.) and the health and family committee; a deputy member of the committee on constitutional affairs and legislation and the committee on the rights of the child; and a member of Serbia's parliamentary friendship groups with Denmark and Finland.

She was promoted to the fifth position on the VMSZ's list in the 2016 Serbian parliamentary election and missed election when the list fell to four mandates. The party again provided parliamentary support for the SNS-led administration, and in September 2016 Vicsek was appointed as a secretary of state in the education ministry. In this position, she was responsible for overseeing pre-school education, inclusion, education of minority communities and vulnerable groups, and the prevention and overcoming of violence and discrimination in education. She also played a leading role in co-ordinating the ministry's response to the COVID-19 pandemic in 2020.

The VMSZ led a successful drive to increase its voter turnout in the 2020 parliamentary election and won a record nine seats. Vicsek, who again appeared in the fifth position on the party's list, was elected to a second term. The SNS won a landslide majority victory. When the new administration was formed, Vicsek was again appointed as a secretary of state in the education ministry and resigned her assembly seat on 27 November 2020.

Vicsek was given the twelfth position on the VMSZ's electoral list in the 2022 parliamentary election and was not re-elected when the list won five seats. For the 2023 Serbian parliamentary election, she appeared in the eighth position and was not elected when the party won six seats. She continued serving as a state secretary in the education ministry until 2024.

Vicsek has received the symbolic final position (thirtieth) on the VMSZ's electoral list for Novi Sad in the 2024 Serbian local elections.

=== European Parliament ===
Although Serbia is not a member state of the European Union (EU), Vojvodina's Hungarian community has had de facto representation in the European Parliament for several years. From 2014 to 2024, Andor Deli represented the community as a member of Hungary's national delegation, serving with Fidesz. He did not seek re-election in the 2024 European Parliament election in Hungary, and Vicsek was nominated in his place, receiving the eighth position on the electoral list of the Fidesz–KDNP alliance.

The Fidesz-KDNP list scored a disappointing overall result in 2024, falling to eleven seats out of twenty-one, but this was sufficient for Vicsek to be elected. She now serves with Fidesz as part of the Patriots for Europe assembly group. She is a member of the committee on culture and education and the European Union–Serbia stabilization and association committee, and a deputy member of the committee on transport and tourism, the committee on budgets, the committee on budgetary control, and the European Union–Montenegro stabilization and association committee. In January 2025, she was chosen as a vice-president of the European Union's working group on traditional minorities, national communities, and languages.
