= Kinga Kollár =

Hungarian politician (born 1978)

Kinga Kollár MEP
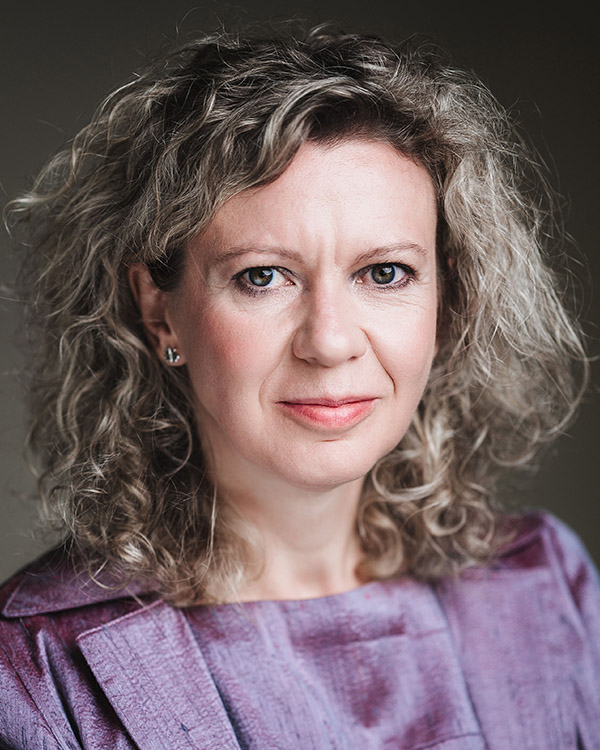
- Kinga Kollár in 2024

Member of the European Parliament
- Incumbent
- Assumed office 16 July 2024
- Constituency: Hungary

Personal details
- Born: 6 March 1978 (age 48) Esztergom, Hungary
- Party: Tisza
- Other political affiliations: European People's Party
- Education: Eötvös Loránd University (JD)
- Occupation: Lawyer • Politician

Kinga Kollár (born 6 March 1978) is a Hungarian politician of the Tisza Party who was elected member of the European Parliament in 2024. She previously worked at the Directorate-General for Economic and Financial Affairs.
