= Tibor Bana =

Hungarian politician (born 1985)

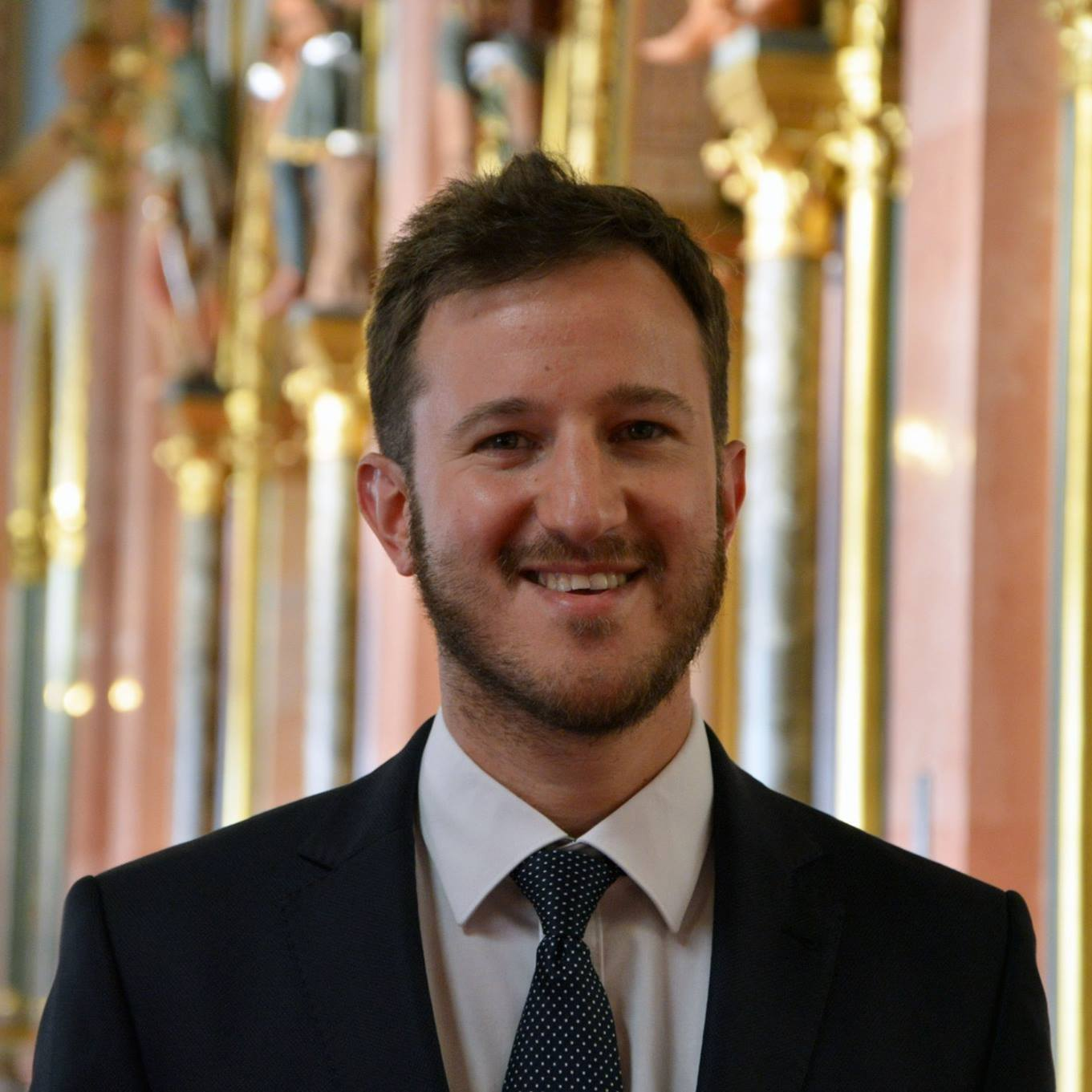
- Tibor Bana in 2018

Member of the National Assembly
- In office 14 May 2010 – 1 May 2022

Personal details
- Born: 1 December 1985 (age 40) Körmend, Hungary
- Party: MIÉP (2004–2006); Jobbik (2007–2020)
- Profession: economist, political scientist, politician

Tibor Bana (born 1 December 1985) is a Hungarian economist, political scientist and politician, who was the member of the National Assembly (MP) between 2010 and 2022, sitting as a Jobbik politician until 2020, then as a non-partisan.

== Profession ==
Tibor Bana was born in Körmend on 1 December 1985. He is Calvinist. He was elected presbyter of the local Calvinist parish in Szentgotthárd in 2012 and was re-elected in 2017.

He finished his secondary studies at the Nagy Lajos Secondary Grammar School in Szombathely in 2004. He earned a degree in political science and economics at the Corvinus University of Budapest in 2009. Currently, he attends Doctoral School of Demography and Sociology, University of Pécs.

== Political career ==
Bana was a member of the youth organization of the far-right Hungarian Justice and Life Party (MIÉP) between 2004 and 2006. He presided the organization from 2005 until his quit from the party in the autumn of 2006. He joined Jobbik in early 2007 and participated in the establishment of its local branch in Vas County. He was elected president of the Vas County branch of Jobbik in 2008. He was a domestic assistant of MEP Zoltán Balczó from 2009 to 2010. He was re-elected in 2010, 2012, 2014 and 2016. He was elected one of the vice-presidents of the party in May 2018. He held the position until January 2020. He was elected president of the Vas County branch again in February 2020.

Bana ran as candidate for MP for Körmend (Vas County 5th constituency) in the 2010 parliamentary election. Ha came to the second place (15.6 percent) after Fidesz candidate and winner Zsolt V. Németh. Nevertheless, Bana was elected MP via the national list of the Jobbik. As he was one of the youngest MPs for years, he acted as a senior recorder during the inaugural plenary sessions either in 2010, 2014 and 2018. Bana was again the candidate of his party in Körmend (Vas County 3rd constituency) in the 2014 parliamentary election, but Zsolt V. Németh defended his mandate and Bana came to the second place with 22.02 percent. Bana obtained a mandate from the national list of the Jobbik. Bana unsuccessfully contested for Körmend constituency for the third time in the 2018 parliamentary election, where Zsolt V. Németh was re-elected. Bana received 26.81 percent of the vote. He became MP via the national list of the Jobbik. Bana has been a member of the Committee on European Affairs since 2010. He served as vice-chairman of the committee from 2014 to 2020. He was also a member, then vice-chairman of the Ad hoc Committee on Innovation and Development between 2011 and 2014.

Disagreeing with the direction and methods of the new party leadership led by Péter Jakab, who was elected president of Jobbik in January 2020, Bana announced his quit from Jobbik and its parliamentary group on 2 March 2020. He said, "he wanted the party to operate as a center-right, civic and European force, instead nihilism, populism and internal showdown came under the leadership of Péter Jakab and Márton Gyöngyösi, which is completely unacceptable". Bana retained his parliamentary seat, sitting as an independent MP, until the end of the parliamentary term in 2022. He founded the civil organization Association for Vas County in June 2020. He participated in the 2021 opposition primary as a candidate of the Everybody's Hungary Movement (MMM) in Körmend constituency. He defeated Momentum candidate Dániel Pleva, consequently he became the joint opposition candidate of United for Hungary against the ruling party Fidesz in the 2022 parliamentary election. In case of victory, Bana decided to will join the caucus of the LMP – Hungary's Green Party. In the 2022 parliamentary election, Bana was defeated by Fidesz candidate Zsolt V. Németh, and because he was not on national list of opposition alliance this time, he left parliament after 12 years.
