= Dóra Dávid =

Hungarian politician (born 1985)

Dóra Dávid MEP
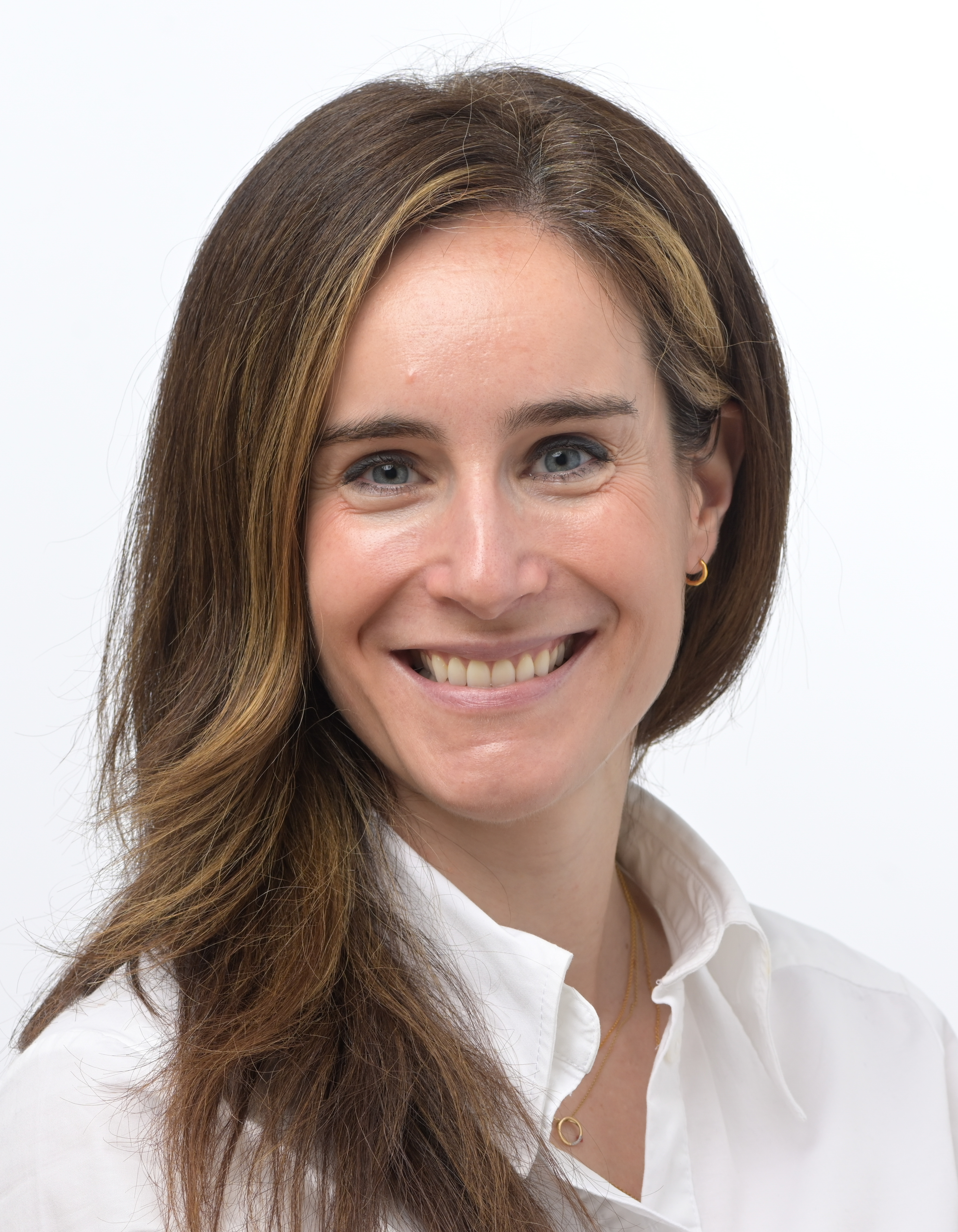
- Official portrait, 2024

Member of the European Parliament
- Incumbent
- Assumed office 16 July 2024
- Constituency: Hungary

Personal details
- Born: 14 March 1985 (age 41) Pécs, Hungary
- Party: Tisza
- Other political affiliations: European People's Party
- Education: King's College London; University of Cambridge

Dóra Dávid (born 14 March 1985) is a Hungarian politician of the Tisza Party who was elected member of the European Parliament in 2024.

== Early life and career ==
Dávid was born in Pécs and has lived in London since 2001. She graduated from King's College London and the University of Cambridge, and studied German at Heidelberg University with an Erasmus scholarship. After interning and volunteering for the European Commission and the United Nations, she worked as legal advisor to the Jamie Oliver Group, StubHub and Meta.
