= Márton Gyöngyösi =

Hungarian politician

Márton Gyöngyösi MEP, MP
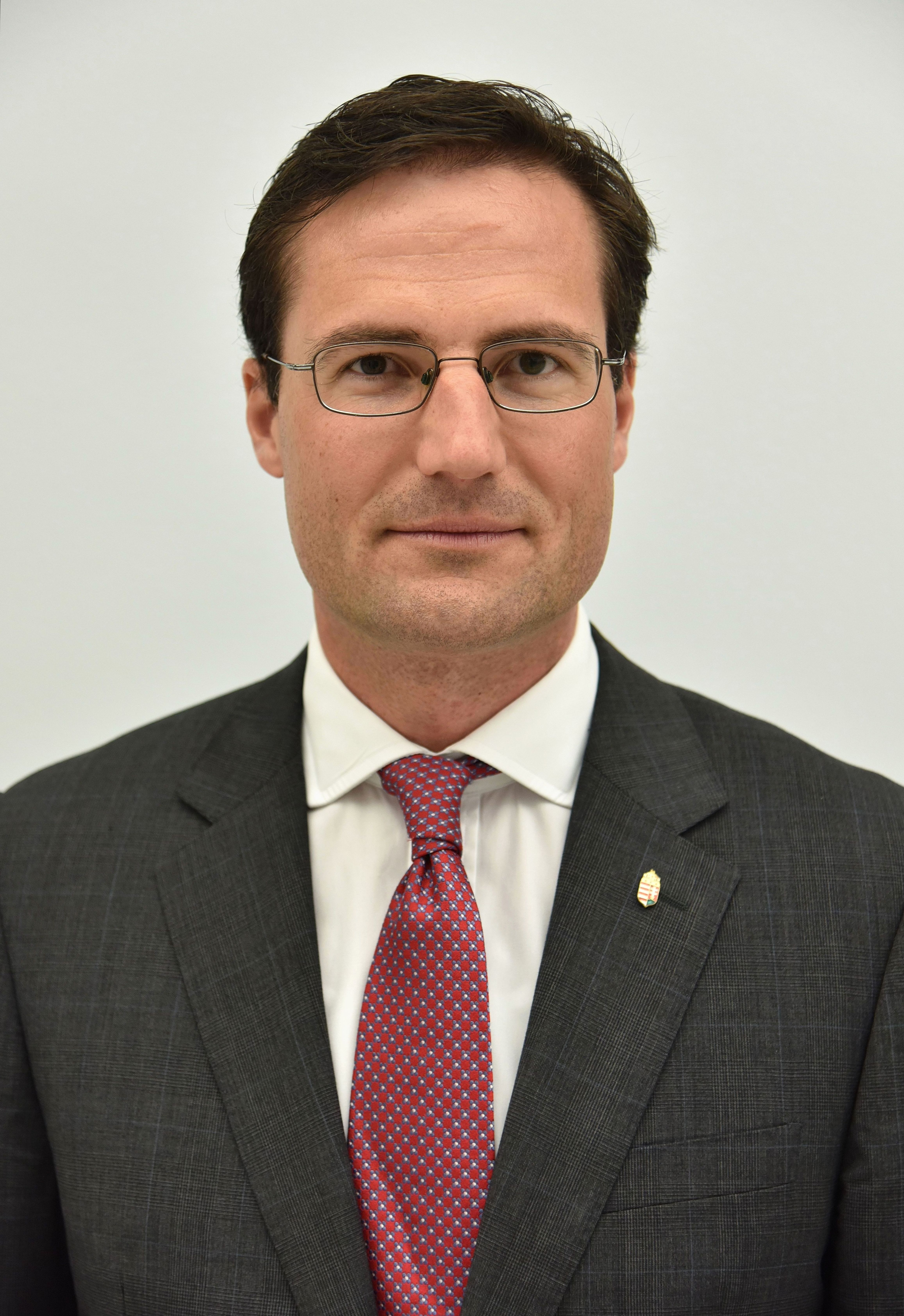

President of Jobbik
- In office 2 July 2022 – 29 June 2024
- Preceded by: Péter Jakab
- Succeeded by: Béla Adorján

Member of the National Assembly
- In office 14 May 2010 – 25 June 2019

Member of the European Parliament
- In office 2 July 2019 – 15 July 2024
- Constituency: Hungary

Personal details
- Born: 8 June 1977 (age 49) Kecskemét, Hungary
- Party: Jobbik (2006–2024)
- Spouse: Ágnes Gyöngyösiné Cserhalmi
- Children: 1
- Education: Trinity College, Dublin
- Profession: politician, economist

Márton Gyöngyösi (born 8 June 1977) is a Hungarian economist and former politician, who served as the leader of the political party Jobbik between 2022 and 2024. He was a Member of Parliament from 2010 to 2019. He was the leader of the Jobbik's parliamentary group from 2018 to 2019. He was elected a Member of the European Parliament (MEP) in the 2019 European Parliament election, as a result he resigned from his seat in the national parliament.

== Early life ==
As a child of Hungarian foreign trade experts, Márton Gyöngyösi spent the most of his childhood in Egypt, Iraq, Afghanistan and India. He graduated from Trinity College, Dublin, in 2000, where he studied economy and political science. He studied for one year at Friedrich Alexander-University in Nuremberg as an exchange student. In Ireland he participated in the professional chartered accountancy examinations (ACA).

In December 2004 he moved back to Hungary and started working as a tax consultant in the Budapest office of KPMG. Between 2007 and 2010 he worked as an expert at Ernst&Young.

He speaks Hungarian, English, German and Russian.

== Political career ==
Gyöngyösi has been participating in the activity of Jobbik since the autumn of 2006. Within a short time, he has become an advisor to the president of the party, Gábor Vona. On the 2010 elections, he was nominated as a candidate for foreign minister of a future Jobbik government.

From 2003 through 2010, he regularly published articles of political and public interest in Hungarian daily Magyar Nemzet as well as business and economy related publications in business daily Napi Gazdaság. Gyöngyösi was elected MP via the party's national list in the 2010 and 2014 parliamentary elections. Between 2010 and 2018 he served as the vice-chair of the Foreign Committee of the Hungarian National Assembly. He was the leader of the Jobbik's parliamentary group from 2018 to 2019.

In 2019, he was nominated as the lead candidate of Jobbik's European Parliament list. Jobbik received 6.34% of the vote in the European Parliament election, a serious throwback from the 14.67% they received at the last European election in 2014. Despite the setback, the party was able to secure 1 mandate, so that Gyöngyösi was elected to the European Parliament.

Gyöngyösi is member of Committee on Foreign Affairs and the Delegation to the ACP-EU Joint Parliamentary Assembly and he is the substitute of Committee on International Trade, Subcommittee on Human Rights and Delegation for relations with the United States.

Following internal disputes, Gyöngyösi was elected leader of the Jobbik on 2 July 2022, acquiring 68 percent of the vote. He defeated István Földi, a confidant of former party president Péter Jakab. Gyöngyösi told "in Hungary, there is no real national and real conservative party on the political spectrum", he wants to lead and build one. He added "my task is to shake up the opposition voters, to shake up the opposition, to show with the leadership of Jobbik that it is indeed possible to offer an alternative to this [Orbán] government".

Following Jobbik's poor result in the 2024 European Parliament election, he announced that he will not run for the party leadership again. In October 2024, he announced his retirement from politics.

During the 2026 Hungarian parliamentary election, he endorsed the Tisza Party.

=== International politics ===
Gyöngyösi has been a key figure in the transformation of Jobbik to a mainstream party. As the politician of Jobbik in charge of foreign affairs he was the initiator of the Wage Union European Citizens’ Initiative. According to Gyöngyösi the European Union should give more powers to its member states, but close cooperation is necessary.

According to Political Capital, Márton Gyöngyösi was found to be the most hawkish against Russia, regularly condemning authoritarian actions with his votes in Russia, China, Venezuela, Bolivia or Nicaragua – among others.

In December 2022 in the interview given to Ukrainska Pravda Gyöngyösi explained his position on Ukraine and on the Russian invasion of Ukraine.

=== Inter-parliamentary relations ===
On March 26, 2007 the Hungarian Parliament established the Hungary-Azerbaijan interparliamentary friendship group. Márton Gyöngyösi was the chairman of this Group.

== Personal life ==
Gyöngyösi is married. His wife is Ágnes Gyöngyösiné Cserhalmi, jurist and economist. They have a son.

== Controversies ==
In 2012, as a junior MP in the Parliament, Gyöngyösi suggested that there should be a list of Jews in the National Assembly. Later he apologised, and told that his statement was “a bad sentence, it was a not-well-thought-through sentence, it was a disastrous sentence.”

Gyöngyösi has been accused of antisemitism a couple other times. On a separate occasion he claimed Israel to run on a "Nazi system, based on racial hatred", and declared in an interview when talking about the numbers of Hungarian Jews murdered during the Holocaust that it is "a fantastic business to jiggle around with the numbers."

National Assembly of Hungary
Preceded by János Volner	Leader of the Jobbik parliamentary group 2018–2019	Succeeded by Péter Jakab
Party political offices
Preceded by Anita Potocskáné Kőrösi (acting)	President of Jobbik; 2022–2024	Succeeded by Béla Adorján
