= Zsuzsanna Borvendég =

Hungarian politician (born 1974)

Zsuzsanna Borvendég MEP
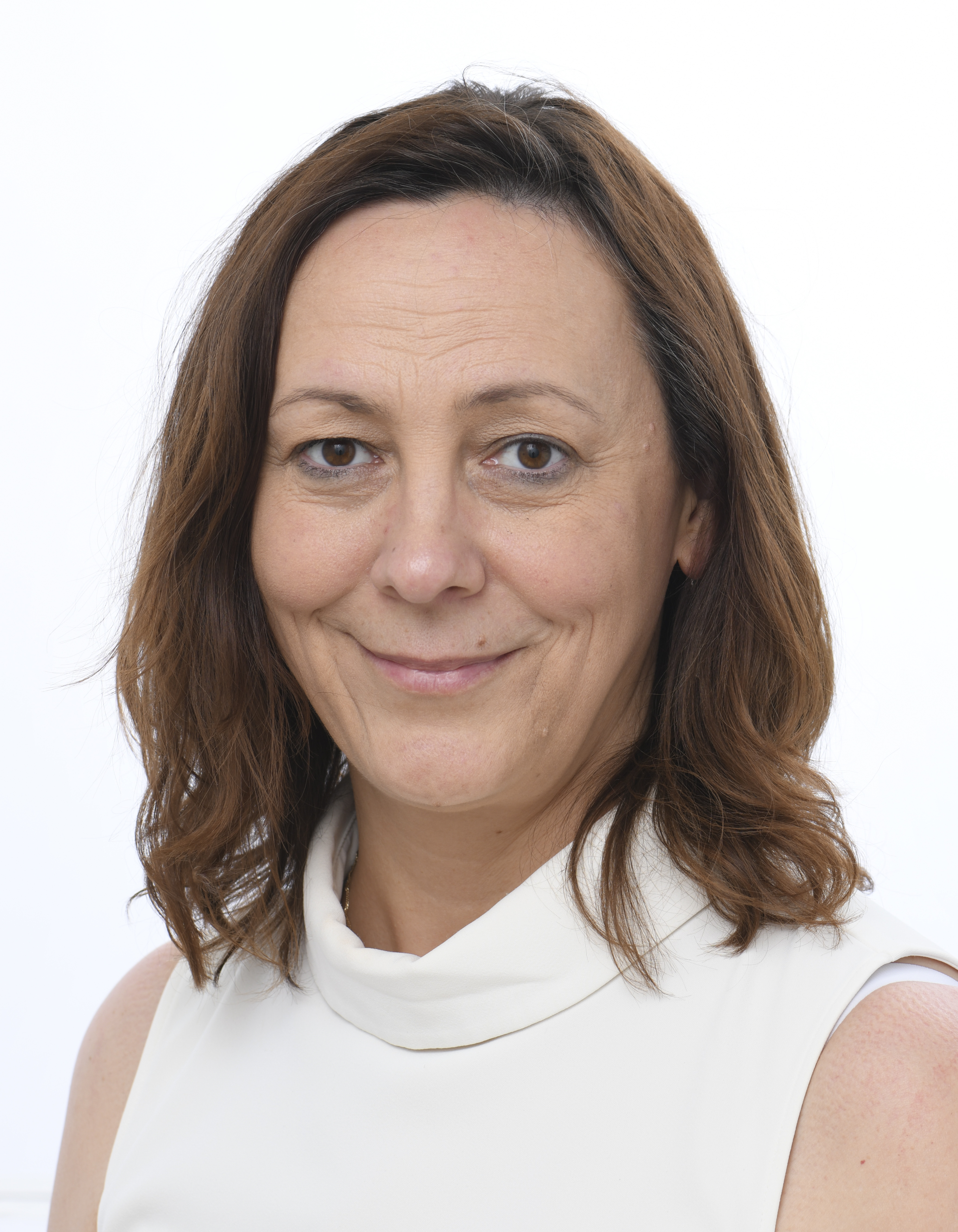
- Official portrait, 2024

Member of the European Parliament for Hungary
- Incumbent
- Assumed office 16 July 2024

Personal details
- Born: 4 November 1974 (age 52) Tatabánya, Hungary
- Party: Our Homeland Movement
- Other political affiliations: Europe of Sovereign Nations
- Awards: Hungarian Order of Merit

Zsuzsanna Borvendég (born 4 November 1974) is a Hungarian historian and politician of Our Homeland Movement who was elected member of the European Parliament in 2024. She previously worked at the Hungarian Research Institute and was awarded the Knight's Cross of the Hungarian Order of Merit in 2022.

== Biography ==
Borvendég was born in Tatabánya, Hungary.

Borvendég completed secondary school at the Bárdos László Gymnasium in Tatabánya in 1993. She graduated from the Faculty of Humanities of Pázmány Péter Catholic University in 1999, and from the university's Faculty of Law and Political Sciences in 2001. In 2016, Borvendég completed a PhD at Pázmány Péter Catholic University with a dissertation titled ''Újságírók és külkereskedők a Kádár-rendszer hírszerzésében'' ("Journalists and foreign-trade officials in the intelligence service of the Kádár regime"). Borvendég worked as a researcher at the Historical Office and later the Historical Archives of the State Security Services. According to her professional CV, she was on unpaid leave for childcare from 2001 to 2011.

Borvendég later worked as a research fellow at the Historical Research Centre of the Institute of Hungarian Research. In May 2024, after becoming an official candidate of the Our Homeland Movement for the European Parliament election, she resigned from the institute.

Her research has focused on Hungary's post-1945 history, particularly state security and intelligence services, Cold War-era foreign trade and economic networks, and the role of state security and economic elites during the transition from communism. Borvendég has criticised efforts to declassify files of former Ministry of Internal Affairs III informants, arguing that the degradation of documents over time has made identifying informants and their motives difficult more difficult.

Borvendég is married and has three children.
