= István Ujhelyi =

Hungarian politician and MEP for Hungary

István Ujhelyi MEP
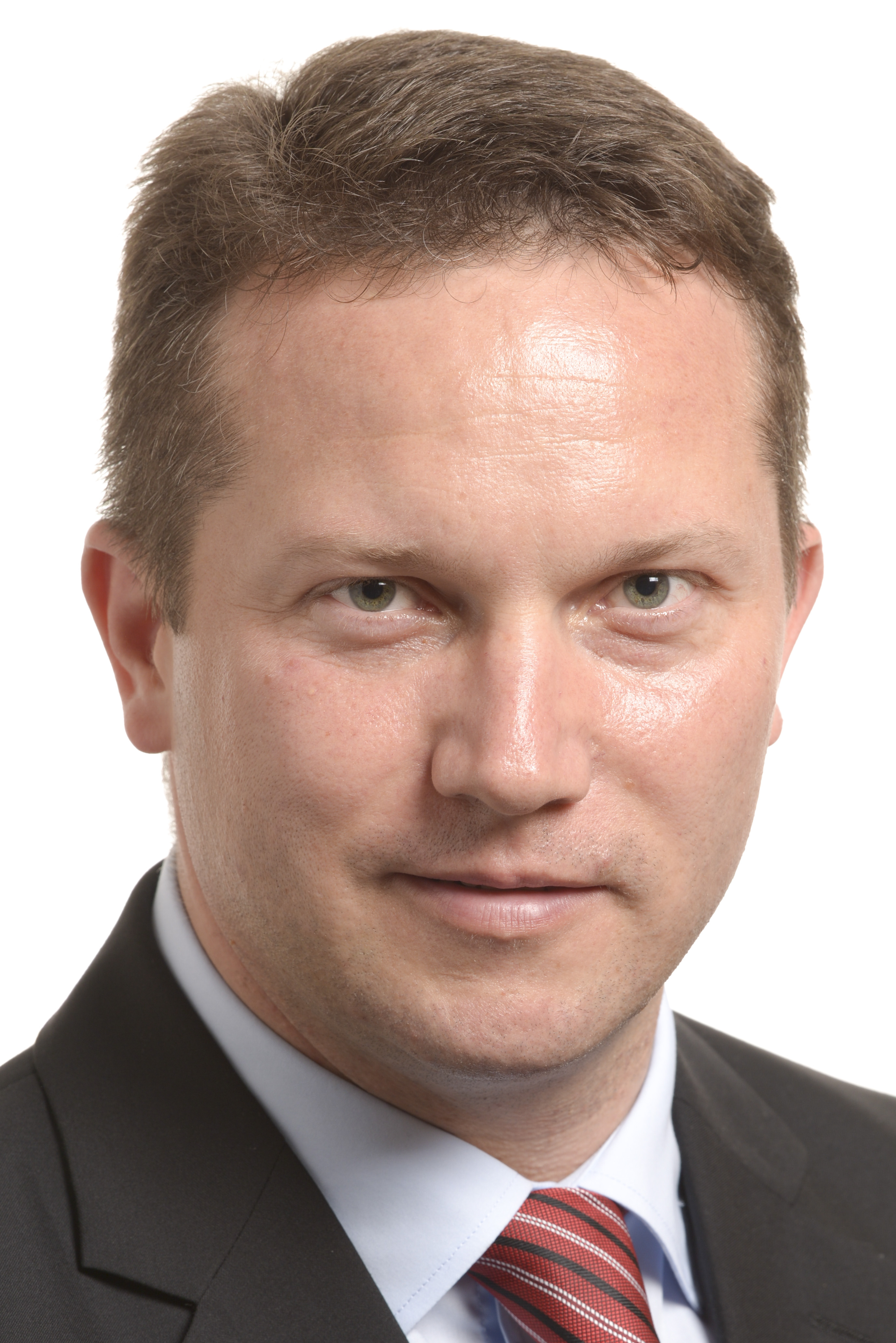

Member of the National Assembly
- In office 15 May 2002 – 5 May 2014

Member of the European Parliament
- In office 5 May 2014 – 15 July 2024

Personal details
- Born: 28 February 1975 (age 51) Berettyóújfalu, Hungary
- Party: Hungarian: MSZP (1993–2022); Opportunity Community (2023–); EU: Party of European Socialists
- Spouse: Éva Péntek
- Children: Balázs; Eszter; Emese; Enikő; Csenge
- Profession: politician

Dr. István Ujhelyi (born 28 February 1975) is a Hungarian politician from the Hungarian Socialist Party, who was MP in the National Assembly of Hungary between 2002 and 2014. He served as a Member of the European Parliament (MEP) from 2014 to 2024.

== Life ==
Ujhelyi finished Tóth Árpád Grammar School in Debrecen in 1993. He graduated from the Faculty of Law and Political Sciences of the University of Szeged in 2002. He went on a political study tour to London as a scholarship-holder of the Council of Europe and to Washington, D.C., on an American scholarship. He was delegated by the youth organizations to the board of trustees of the Hungarian Television Public Foundation and later of the Hungarian Radio Public Foundation. Also in 1999, he was elected a member of the governing body of the Hungarian UN Society.

== Political career ==
Ujhelyi joined the Hungarian Socialist Party (MSZP) in 1993. He was national vice-president of the Left-wing Youth Association from 1995; when the Association changed its name to Young Left-wing in 1999, he remained national vice-president, and has been national president since 2002. He was confirmed in his presidency in February 2004. He was elected president of the local branch of the party, and served as vice-president of its Csongrád County organization from 1998 to 2000. He has been president of the Youth Section of the Socialist Party since 1996, as well as a member of the National Board and, since November 2002, of the national presidium of the party. In 2003 he was elected again to the Socialist Party's most important body, the national presidium. He was elected a representative of the Szeged City Assembly in both the 1994 and 1998 local elections. From 16 October 2004 he was national vice-president and the youngest member of the presidium.

=== Member of the National Assembly, 2002–2014 ===
Ujhelyi first ran in the 1998 parliamentary elections. He later secured a mandate in the 2002 parliamentary election for Szeged, Csongrád County Constituency I. He was an alternate member of the Hungarian delegation to the NATO Parliamentary Assembly. From 2004 he served as a governmental commissioner for Child and Youth Affairs. In the parliamentary election in 2006 he obtained an individual mandate for Szeged. He was the State Secretary of the Ministry for Local Government and Regional Development between 1 July 2006 and 14 May 2008. After that he served as State Secretary of Prime Minister's Office from 21 April 2009 to 29 May 2010 in the Cabinet of Gordon Bajnai.

In the 2010 national election Ujhelyi was elected to the National Assembly of Hungary again from the party's national list. His party nominated him for the position of one of the deputy speakers of the National Assembly of Hungary.

=== Member of the European Parliament, 2014–2024 ===
Ujhelyi was elected as a Member of the European Parliament in the May 2014 European Parliament election. He has since been serving as vice chairman of the Committee on Transport and Tourism under the leadership of chairman Michael Cramer and later Karima Delli.

In addition to his committee assignment, Ujhelyi is a substitute member of the parliament's delegation for relations with the People's Republic of China, Committee on the Environment, Public Health and Food Safety and Subcommittee on Public Health. He is also a member of the European Internet Forum.

Following the 2022 Hungarian parliamentary election, In April 2022, Ujhelyi showed interest in running for MSZP leadership and he proposed a new name "Opportunity – Party Community of Hungarian Social Democrats" (Hungarian: Esély – Magyar Szociáldemokraták Pártközössége). On 2 October 2022, Ujhelyi announced that he is leaving the Hungarian Socialist Party, criticizing "MSZP's lack of vision". The party demanded he return his parliamentary seat. Shortly before he left the party, Ujhelyi founded Esély Közösség, a community for social democrats, which transformed itself into a party after Ujhelyi's quit from MSZP.

In September 2022, Ujhelyi was the recipient of the Infrastructure, Transport and Tourism Award at The Parliament Magazine's annual MEP Awards.

In June 2023, Ujhelyi announced he would end his career as an MEP and not run in the 2024 Parliament election. Ujhelyi was appointed ambassador of the UN Tourism in Brussels in June 2024.
