= László Sebián-Petrovszki =

Hungarian academic and politician

Member of the National Assembly of Hungary
- In office 2 December 2019 – April 2022

Member of the National Assembly of Hungary
- In office 2 May 2022 – 9 May 2026

Personal details
- Born: 15 September 1977 (age 48) Békéscsaba, Hungary
- Party: Democratic Coalition (Hungary)

László Sebián-Petrovszki (born in Békéscsaba, Hungary on 15 September 1977) is a Hungarian academic and politician. He is a member of parliament in the National Assembly of Hungary (Országgyűlés) since 2 December 2019. In 2004, he served as a secretary of state in the Prime Minister's Office. During the 2022 general elections he was re-elected member of parliament. He is also the second openly-gay MP in the Hungarian National Assembly.
