= Opportunity Community =

Opportunity Community Esély Közösség
- Abbreviation: EK
- Leader: István Ujhelyi
- Founded: 2022
- Split from: Hungarian Socialist Party
- Ideology: Social democracy Pro-Europeanism
- Political position: Centre-left
- European Parliament group: Progressive Alliance of Socialists and Democrats
- Colours: Red
- National Assembly: 0 / 199
- European Parliament: 0 / 21

Website
- eselykozosseg.hu

Opportunity Community (Hungarian: Esély Közösség, EK) is an organisation led by Member of the European Parliament István Ujhelyi. In April 2022, Ujhelyi showed interest in running for MSZP leadership and he proposed a new name "Opportunity – Party Community of Hungarian Social Democrats" (Hungarian: Esély – Magyar Szociáldemokraták Pártközössége). He left the Hungarian Socialist Party after the failure of United for Hungary in the 2022 parliamentary election, criticizing "MSZP's lack of vision".
