= Klára Dobrev =

Hungarian politician (born 1972)

Klára Dobrev MEP
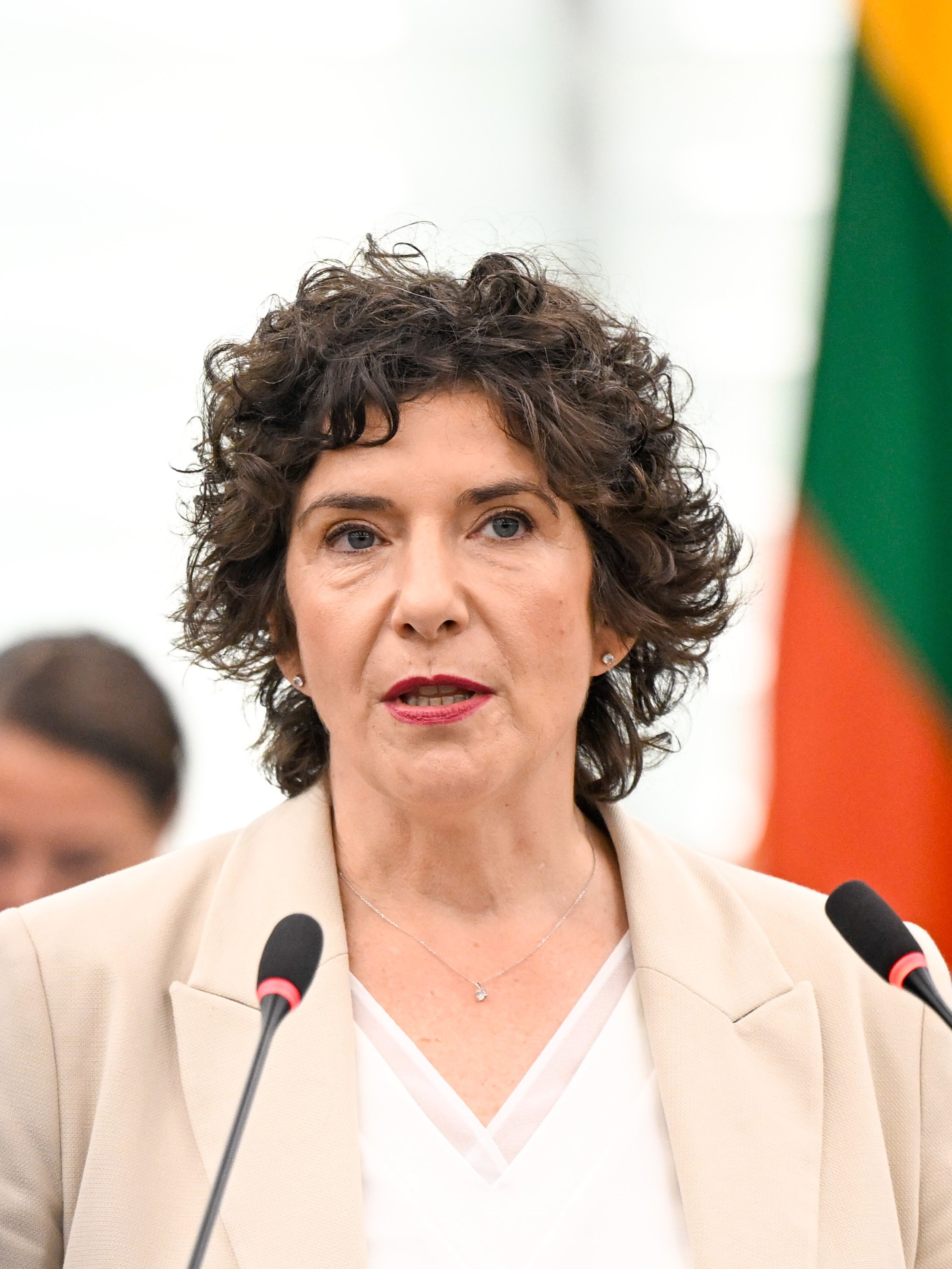
- Dobrev in 2025

Leader of the Democratic Coalition
- In office 1 June 2025 – 8 June 2026
- Preceded by: Ferenc Gyurcsány
- Succeeded by: László Varju

Member of the European Parliament for Hungary
- Incumbent
- Assumed office 2 July 2019

Vice-President of the European Parliament
- In office 2 July 2019 – 18 January 2022 Serving with See List
- President: David Sassoli; Roberta Metsola (acting)

Personal details
- Born: Klara Petrova Dobreva; 2 February 1972 (age 54) Sofia, Bulgaria
- Party: DK (2011–present)
- Other political affiliations: MSZP (1994–2011)
- Spouse: Ferenc Gyurcsány (m. 1995; div. 2025)
- Children: 3
- Relatives: Antal Apró (grandfather)
- Education: Corvinus University of Budapest; Eötvös Loránd University

Klára Dobrev (born Klara Petrova Dobreva, Bulgarian: Клара Петрова Добрева; on 2 February 1972) is a Hungarian politician who serves as Member of the European Parliament and was a leader of the Democratic Coalition until 12 April 2026. She has previously served as Vice-President of the European Parliament and Shadow Prime Minister of Hungary.

== Early life and education ==
Dobrev was born in Sofia, Bulgaria to a Hungarian mother, Piroska Apró, and a Bulgarian father, Petar Dobrev. Her maternal grandfather, Antal Apró, a communist politician, served as Minister of Industry, Deputy Prime Minister and also Speaker of the National Assembly in the Hungarian People's Republic.

Dobrev holds a degree in economics from Corvinus University of Budapest, and a law degree from Faculty of Law of the Eötvös Loránd University. During her years at the University of Economics she was a member of AIESEC, and at the organization's 1992 world conference she was the animator board's vice president responsible for public relations. Dobrev spent her internship at Modi Xerox as a marketing assistant in Bangalore, India.

== Political career ==
=== Early years ===
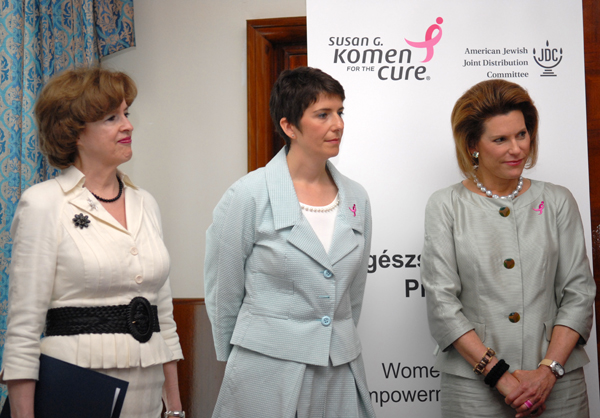
Klára Dobrev (center) with U.S. Ambassador to Hungary April H. Foley (left) and Nancy Brinker, former ambassador to Hungary (right). Budapest, 10 July 2008

Dobrev has held several government positions in the past, including Chief Cabinet to Péter Medgyessy during the 2002 parliamentary election, and vice-president of the Office for the National Development Plan and EU Support, where she served from 2002 until her husband's nomination for prime minister in 2004, when she resigned.

Dobrev is a senior lecturer at Eötvös Loránd University. She is chairperson of the Hungarian section of the UN Women. Dobrev became CEO of Altus Ltd. in 2009, a development consultant company, owned by her husband.

=== Since 2019 ===
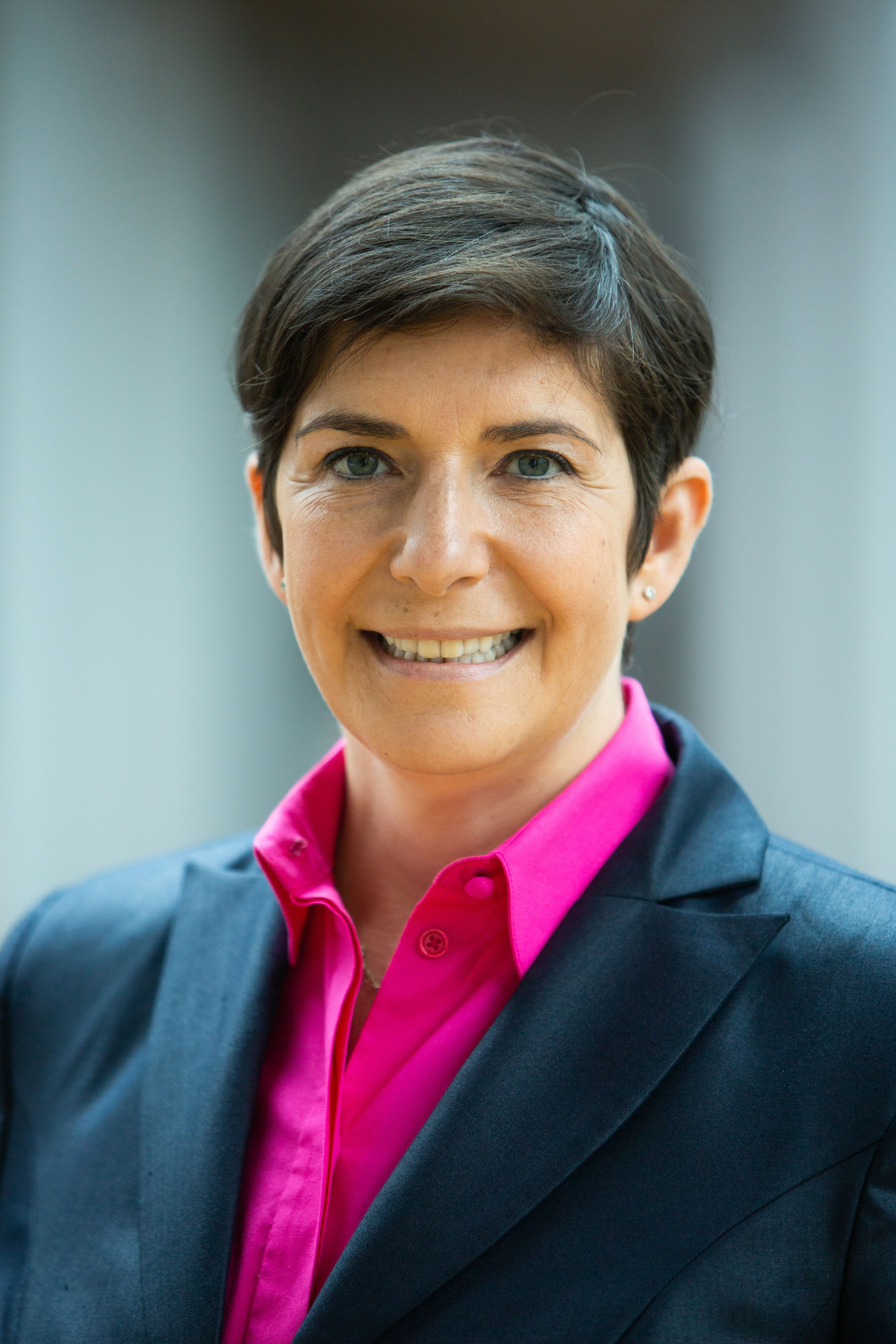
In 2021

In 2019, Dobrev re-entered politics, as the lead candidate of the Democratic Coalition's European Parliament list for the 2019 election. With a stunning and surprising, 16.05% result for her party, better than all the surveys predicted, she was elected a Member of the European Parliament. Dobrev was elected a Vice-President of the European Parliament on 3 July 2019.

In October 2021, Dobrev stated that she was the frontrunner in the primary election of the coalition meant to run united against Viktor Orbán in the 2022 parliamentary election. Dobrev gained 34% of the votes in the first round in September 2021, running as the candidate of the Democratic Coalition and the Hungarian Liberal Party. In the second round held in October, she received 43% of the votes and was consequently defeated by Péter Márki-Zay of the Everybody's Hungary Movement, who gained 57%.

On 16 September 2022, the Democratic Coalition announced that it would form a British style shadow cabinet led by Dobrev, in to build a credible alternative to the incumbent Fifth Orbán Government. Three days later she introduced all the 16 members of her shadow cabinet. Following the party and its allies' poor performance (8%) in the 2024 European Parliament election in Hungary on June 9, Dobrev announced the dissolution of the shadow cabinet which ended on the next day.

On 8 May 2025, her husband Ferenc Gyurcsány resigned as DK leader and retired from politics. 24 days later, the party elected her as Gyurcsány's successor.

After the 2026 parliamentary election on 12 April, in which the Democratic Coalition failed to reach the 5% threshold to enter parliament (receiving only 1.18% of the vote), Dobrev announced her resignation as party leader, accepting responsibility for the electoral defeat.

== Other activities ==
- European Council on Foreign Relations (ECFR), Member (since 2021)

== Personal life ==
Dobrev was married to Ferenc Gyurcsány, Prime Minister of Hungary, since 1994, they have three children. In May 2025, the couple announced their divorce.

== Recognition ==
She was recognized as one of the BBC's 100 women of 2013.

== Sources ==
- "A Glimpse into Hungary" (PDF) Ministry of Economy and Transport for the Republic of Hungary, August 2005, retrieved 23 November 2005.
- "Interview with Klára Dobrev" by András Lindner and Zoltán Horváth, 1 September 2005, retrieved 23 November 2005.
- Edit Kéri: Kik lőttek a Kossuth téren 56-ban? ISBN 9630619830
