= Edina Tóth =

Hungarian politician

Edina Tóth MEP
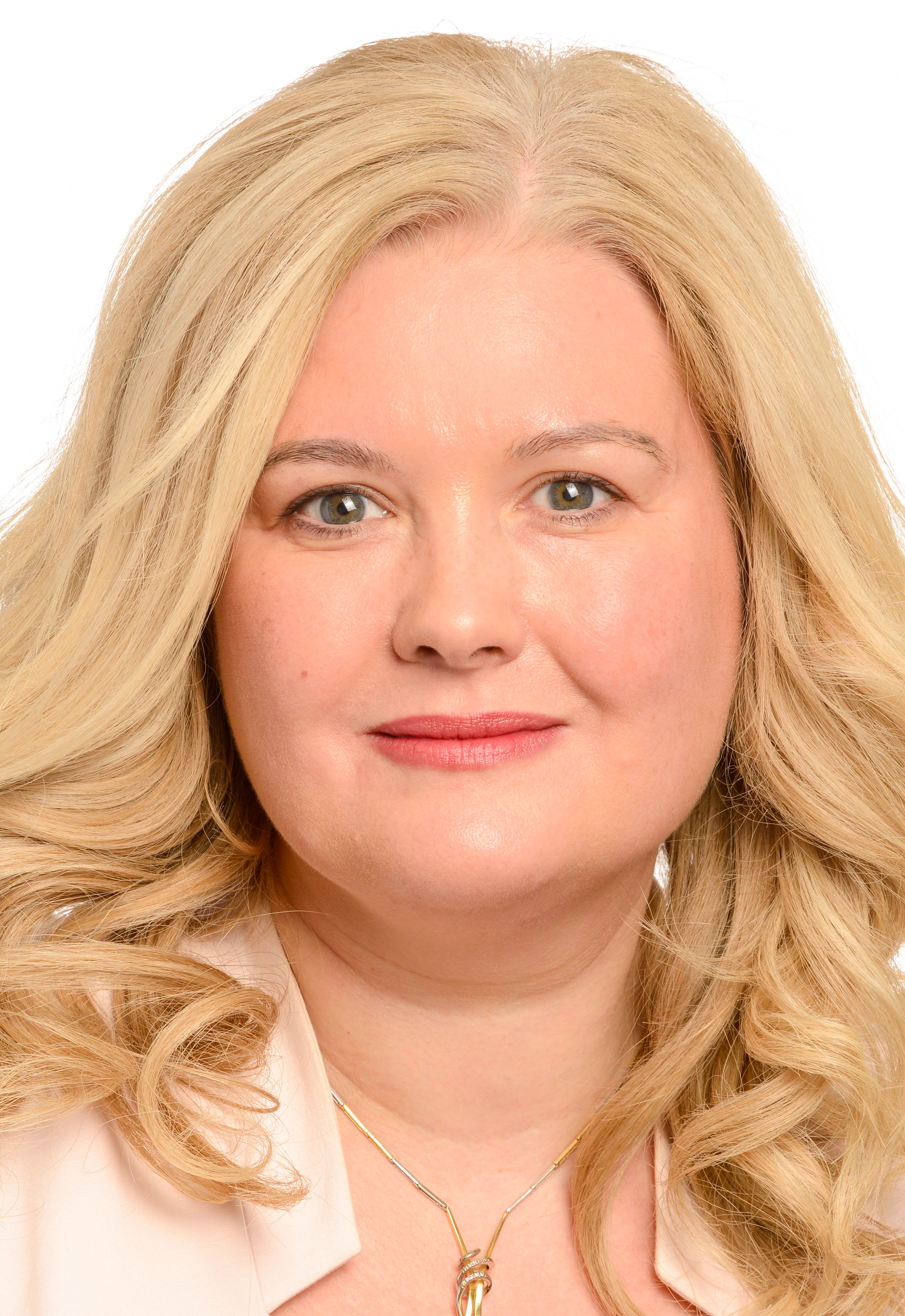

Member of the European Parliament for Hungary
- In office 2 July 2019 – 15 July 2024

Personal details
- Party: Fidesz

Edina Tóth (born 11 March 1975) is a Hungarian politician currently serving as a Member of the European Parliament for Fidesz.

== Education ==
Tóth graduated from Pázmány Péter Catholic University in 1998 and from Századvég School of Politics in 1999.

== Career ==
Tóth was vice-president of Fidelitas from 1996 until 2003 and vice-president of European Democrat Students from 1999 until 2001. She then worked for the Hungarian Ministry of Foreign Affairs and MEP József Szájer until 2004. In 2004, she started working in the European Parliament as a political advisor to the European People's Party as a member of the Committee on Women's Rights and Gender Equality, and from 2007 until 2019 on the Committee on Industry, Energy and Research.

In 2019, Tóth was elected MEP. She is currently a member of the Committee on the Environment, Public Health and Food Safety, the Subcommittee on Public Health and the Delegation for relations with the Arab Peninsula.
