= László Varju =

Hungarian politician (born 1961)

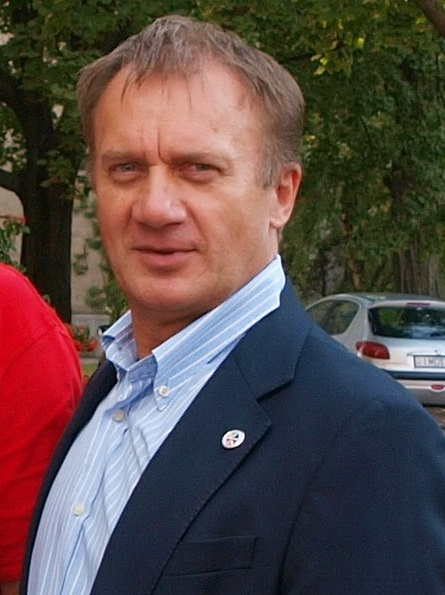
- László Varju in 2013

Member of the National Assembly
- In office 24 March 2025 – 8 May 2026
- In office 30 June 2014 – 6 December 2024
- Preceded by: Csaba Molnár
- In office 15 May 2002 – 5 May 2014

Leader of the Democratic Coalition
- Incumbent
- Assumed office 8 June 2026
- Preceded by: Klára Dobrev

Personal details
- Born: 22 August 1961 (age 65) Komló, Hungary
- Party: MSZP (1989–2011); DK (2011– )
- Occupation: Politician

László Varju (born 22 August 1961) is a Hungarian politician and mining engineer, current leader of the extra-parliamentary Democratic Coalition (DK). He had been a member of the National Assembly of Hungary from 2002 to 2026 (with brief interruptions in 2014 and 2024–2025). He served as Secretary of State for National Development and Economy from 2008 to 2010.

== Profession ==
László Varju was born on 22 August 1961 in Komló, Baranya County. He spent his childhood in Mágocs. He attended Károly Zipernovszky Secondary School of Mechanical Engineering in Pécs, where he obtained a qualification of electrical technician in 1979. He also obtained a qualification in collier, blasting and mining at the Mining Technical School in Pécs. He worked for the Mecsek Ore Mining Company between 1979 and 1989. After the transition to democracy, he managed a company in the private sector between 1989 and 1992.

In 2005 he studied at Szent István University as an economist, but he graduated from Károly Róbert College with a degree in economics (present-day both part of the Hungarian University of Agriculture and Life Science) and graduated from Corvinus University of Budapest in 2008. Currently he is a PhD student at the Miklós Zrínyi University of National Defense (ZMNE) and its successor, the National University of Public Service (NKE). He is married and father of two daughters and a son.

== Political career ==
Varju was a founding member of the Hungarian Socialist Party (MSZP) since 1989. He served as vice-president of the Left Youth Association (BIT), the youth organization of the party, from 1992 to 1995. Varju was a member of the General Assembly of Pest County between 1994 and 2002, where he worked for the youth and sport committee. He was also deputy leader of the MSZP caucus in the county assembly during the eight-year period. Varju served as mayor of Taksony from 2002 to 2006. He was defeated by an independent candidate László Kreisz in the 2006 local elections.

He was elected a Member of Parliament via his party's regional list of Pest County in the 2002 parliamentary election, 2006 and 2010 parliamentary elections. He was a member of the Regional Development Committee from 2002 to 2008. He was also Chairman of the Central Hungary Regional Development Council from 2007 to 2008. Varju served as Secretary of State for National Development and Economy in the cabinets of Ferenc Gyurcsány and Gordon Bajnai, from 1 December 2008 to 29 May 2010. After the 2010 national election, when the Socialist Party was defeated by Fidesz, Varju was a member of the Health Committee from 2010 to 2011.

Thereafter, Varju became a part of Gyurcsány's inner circle, which heavily criticized the leadership of the MSZP. As a result, he joined Democratic Coalition Platform founded by the former prime minister. When the platform split from the Socialists on 22 October 2011 he joined to the newly formed party and left the MSZP and its parliamentary group. Formally, Varju was an independent MP between 2011 and 2018. He was a member of the Committee on Human Rights, Minorities, Civil and Religious Affairs from 2011 to 2014.

Varju failed to win a parliamentary seat during the 2014 parliamentary election. However, fellow DK member Csaba Molnár resigned because he had become a Member of the European Parliament, as a result the DK presidency had asked Varju to fill the vacancy in the Hungarian parliament. He took his seat on 30 June 2014 and worked for the Economic Committee from 2014 to 2017 and for the Committee on Budgets since 2017. He is vice-president of the DK since 2015. Varju was elected MP for Újpest (Budapest Constituency XI) in the 2018 parliamentary election, defeating Fidesz candidate Barna Pál Zsigmond. He joined the newly formed Democratic Coalition caucus. He was appointed chairman of the Committee on Budgets in May 2018.

In the 2021 Hungarian opposition primaries, his party also ran in Budapest 11 - Újpest, Angyalföld - constituency with the support of the All Hungary Movement. With the support of the opposition parties DK, MSZP, Momentum, Párbeszéd, LMP, Jobbik and the Liberal Party, László Varju won the primary election and the 2022 Hungarian parliamentary election in his constituency as the sole candidate.

Varju lost his parliamentary mandate in the 2026 Hungarian parliamentary election, when he came to the fourth place in Budapest 12th constituency and DK failed to reach 5% threshold. Following the resignation of Klára Dobrev, Varju was elected leader of the party on 8 June 2026.
