= Anita Potocskáné Kőrösi =

Hungarian politician

Member of the National Assembly
- In office 18 May 2018 – 1 May 2022

Personal details
- Born: May 23, 1981 (age 44) Siófok, Hungary

Anita Potocskáné Kőrösi (born 23 May 1981 in Siófok), is a Hungarian politician, economist, tax advisor, and chartered accountant, who was a member of Hungarian National Assembly from 2018 to 2022 and vice-president of Jobbik.

== Early life ==
In 2005 she graduated from College of Dunaújváros in economics. In 2013 she took a degree in accountancy from University of Pannonia. From 2013 she is a PhD student in University of Kaposvár.

She has a state qualification in two foreign languages.

== Political career ==
She was the deputy mayor of Siófok between 2014 and 2018.

From 2018 to 2022, she is a member of Hungarian National Assembly. She became MP replacing Dávid Janiczak, who decided to remain the mayor of Ózd. On 25 January 2020, she was elected for vice-president of Jobbik. She became deputy president of the party on 7 May 2022.
