= Olga Kálmán =

Hungarian television personality

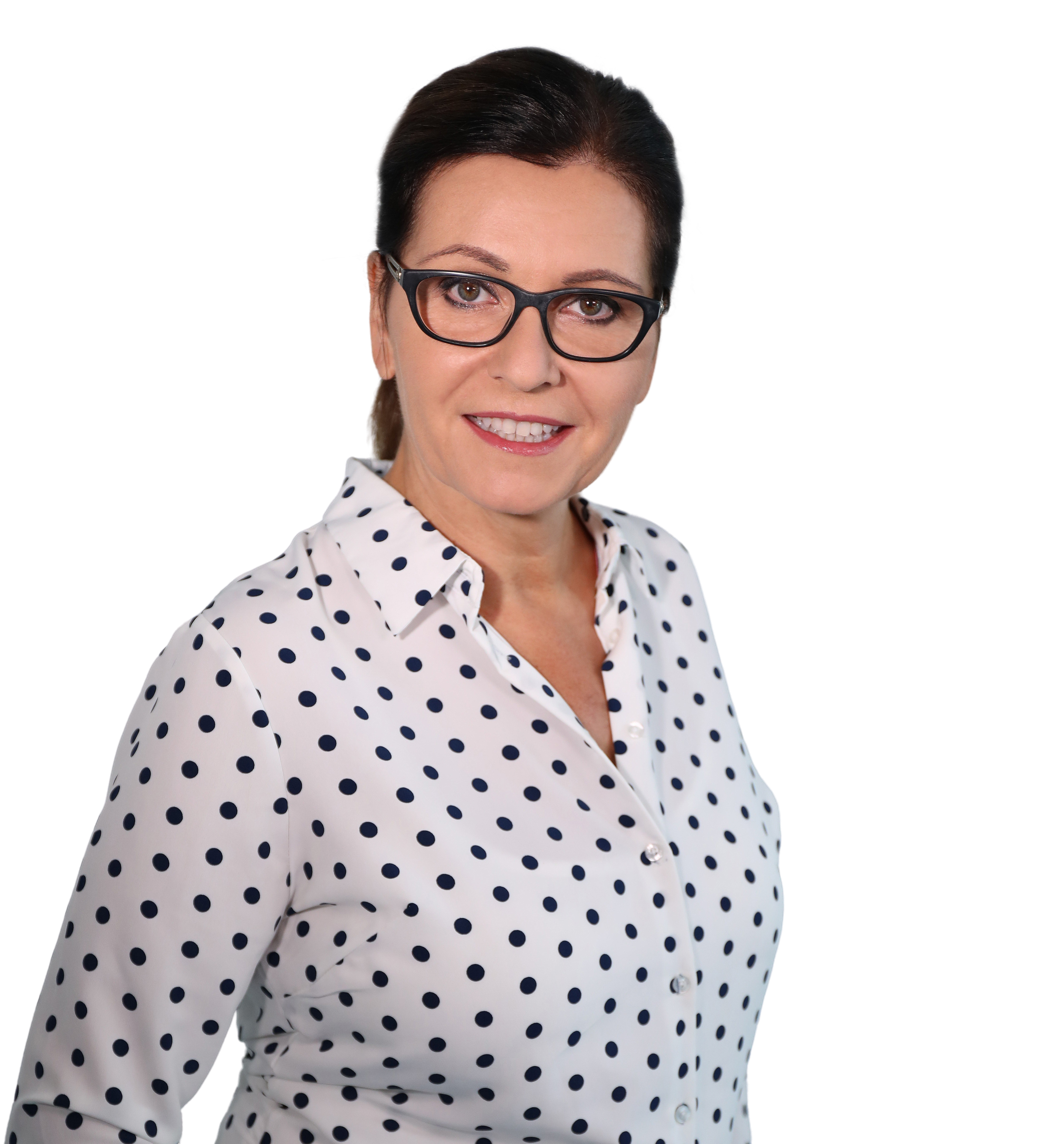
- Kálmán in 2021
- Born: 23 February 1968 (age 58)
- Occupations: News editor; television host; politician; author

Olga Kálmán (born 23 February 1968) is a politically independent Hungarian news editor, television host, left-wing politician, member of parliament, and author. Between 2003 and 2016, she was the host of ATV's Straight Talk (Egyenes Beszéd).

== Career ==
Kálmán is the author of the book Straight Talk. She has received the János Déri award for lifetime achievement and the Hungarian Spokesman Organization's award.

In 2019, Kálmán was announced as the candidate of the Democratic Coalition for the second round of the primaries for the 2019 Budapest mayoral election. Her opponents were Gergely Karácsony of Dialogue for Hungary and the entrepreneur Gábor Kerpel-Fronius (hu) of Momentum. The second round primary took place between 20 and 26 June, with both online and in-person voting. On 23 June a televised debate was held between the three candidates on the channel ATV.

Budapest mayoral primary - second round
Party	Candidate	Votes	%
PM	Gergely Karácsony	33,356	48.9%
DK	Olga Kálmán	25,093	36.8%
Momentum	Gábor Kerpel-Fronius	9,792	14.3%
Total votes		68,363	100.0%

This left Karácsony as the candidate of the opposition to stand against the incumbent mayor, István Tarlós of Fidesz–KDNP, and at the election on 13 October 2019 Karácsony defeated Tarlós with the support of Kálmán.
