= Andor Deli =

Hungarian politician

Andor Deli MEP
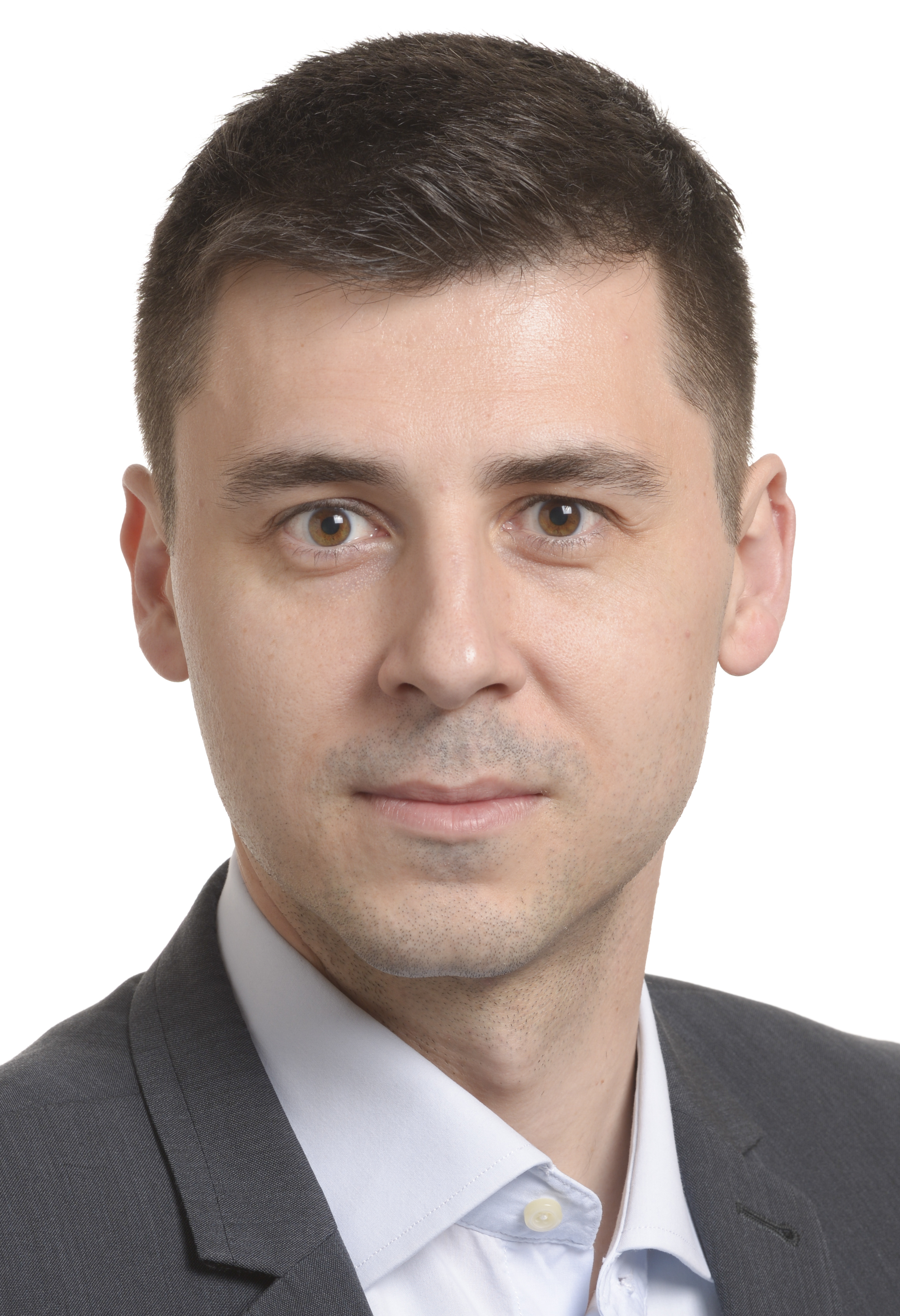

Member of the European Parliament
- In office 1 July 2014 – 15 July 2024
- Constituency: Hungary

Personal details
- Born: 2 May 1977 (age 49) Bečej, SFR Yugoslavia
- Party: Serbian; Alliance of Vojvodina Hungarians; Hungarian; Fidesz; EU; European People's Party
- Children: two daughters
- Education: University of Novi Sad Faculty of Law
- Website: https://deli.fidesz-eu.hu/hu/

Andor Deli (born 2 May 1977) is a Hungarian politician from Vojvodina, Serbia, and Member of the European Parliament (MEP) for Hungary's Fidesz since 2014.

== Career ==
Andor Deli was born into an ethnic Hungarian family in Bečej, SFR Yugoslavia (Hungarian: Óbecse; today Serbia) on 2 May 1977. He attended the University of Novi Sad Faculty of Law, where earned a degree of jurist in 2000. He won a research scholarship to the Europa-Institut at Saarland University for a trimester in 2003. He passed a judicial examination in 2004. He earned a master's degree at the University of Novi Sad in 2008.

Deli joined the Alliance of Vojvodina Hungarians (SVM–VMSZ) in 2001. He worked for the Provincial Secretariat for Education, Administration and National Community in the Autonomous Province of Vojvodina in different positions from 2002 to 2014. He was appointed head of the secretariat and thus became a Vice President of the Government of Vojvodina in 2012. Deli was elected a Member of the European Parliament (MEP) in the 2014 European Parliament election in Hungary as a candidate of the Fidesz party, which sent delegates to the European Parliament in order to represent each Hungarian diaspora in the neighboring countries. Deli aims to represent the Hungarian minority of Vojvodina, Serbia in Brussels. He became a member of the Committee on Transport and Tourism (TRAN) and of the Delegation to the EU-Serbia Stabilisation and Association Parliamentary Committee. He is also a substitute member of the Committee on Regional Development and of the Delegation to the ACP–EU Joint Parliamentary Assembly.

Deli was re-elected MEP in 2019.
