= 2010 Budapest mayoral election =

Mayoral election in Budapest, Hungary

- 3 October 2010
- Turnout: 43.59 %
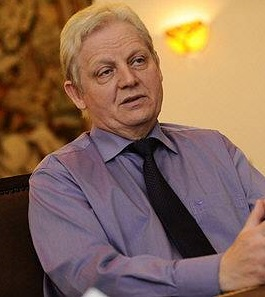

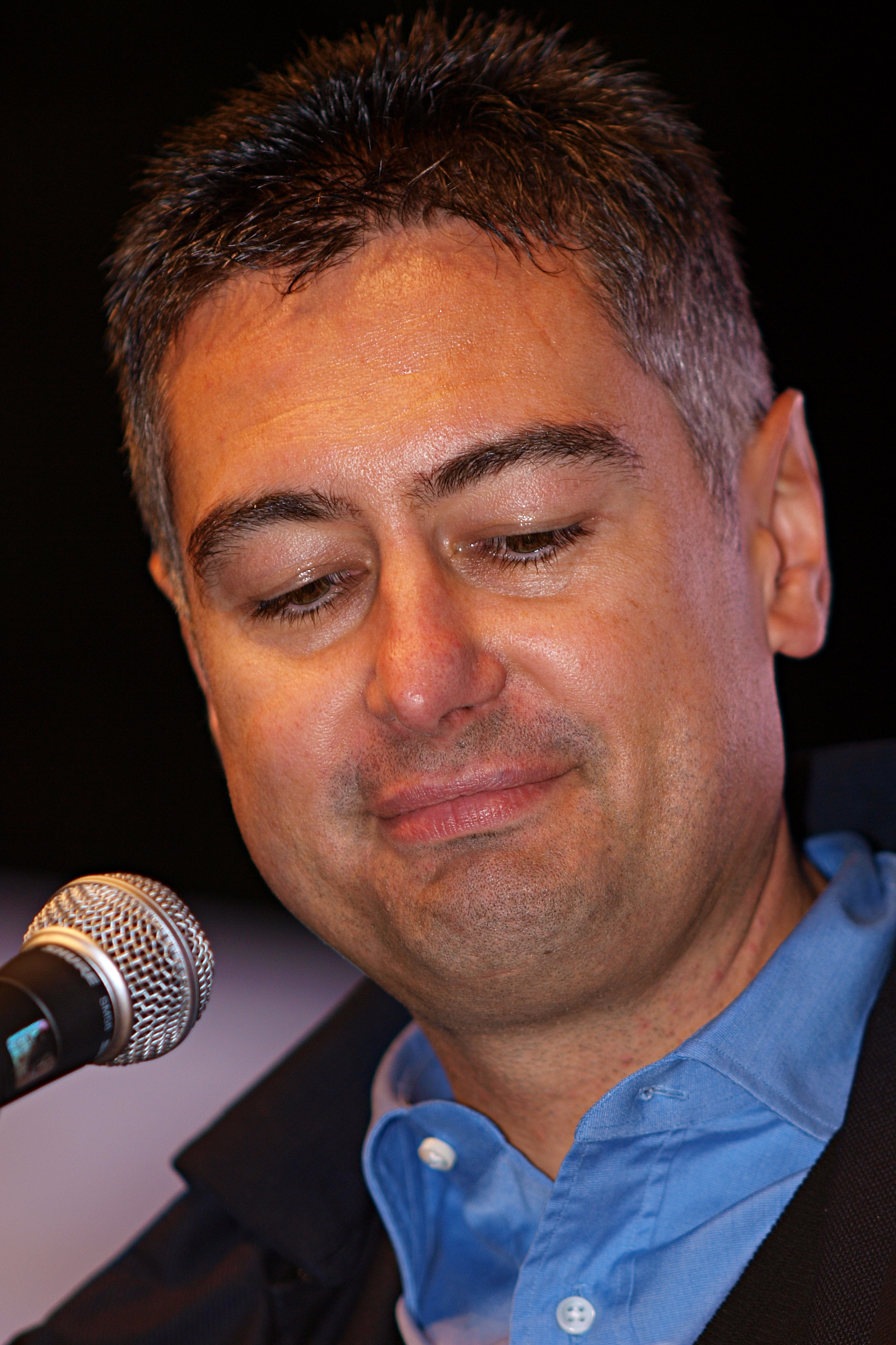

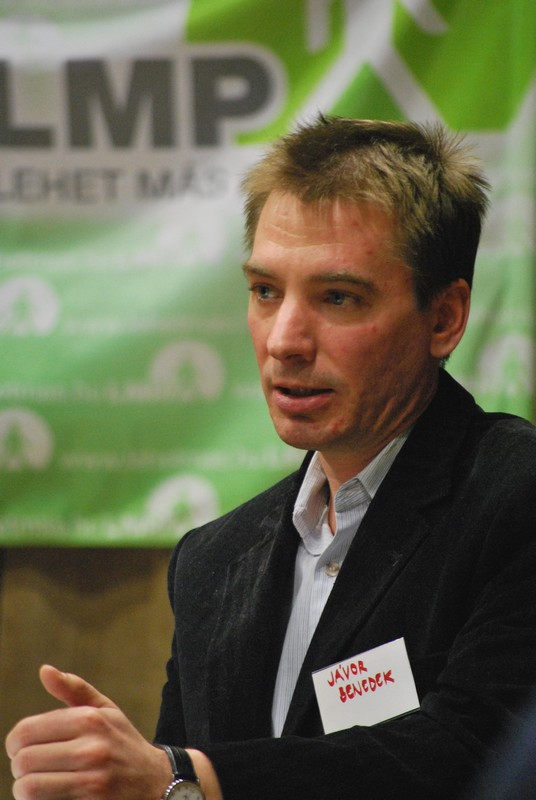

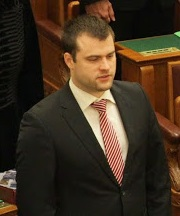
Candidate	István Tarlós	Csaba Horváth
Party	Independent	MSZP
Alliance	Fidesz–KDNP
Vote	321 908	177 783
Percentage	53.37%	29.47%
Candidate	Benedek Jávor	Gábor Staudt
Party	LMP	Jobbik
Vote	59 638	43 839
Percentage	9.89%	7.27%
Mayor before election
Gábor Demszky
SZDSZ
Elected Mayor
István Tarlós
Fidesz–KDNP

The 2010 Budapest mayoral election was held on 3 October 2010 to elect the Mayor of Budapest (főpolgármester). On the same day, local elections were held throughout Hungary, including the districts of Budapest. The election was run using a First-past-the-post voting system. The winner of this election served for 4 years.

The election was won by the governing parties' candidate, István Tarlós.

== Campaign ==
Five-term incumbent Gábor Demszky did not run, due to low approval and the collapse of his party SZDSZ.

== Results ==
Candidate	Party	Votes	%	+/–
István Tarlós	Fidesz–KDNP	321,908	53.37	+8.17
Csaba Horváth	Hungarian Socialist Party	177,783	29.47	–17.39 (Note: Compared to the SZDSZ-MSZP candidate in the previous election.)
Benedek Jávor	Politics Can Be Different	59,638	9.89	New
Gábor Staudt	Jobbik	43,839	7.27	New
Total		603,168	100.00	–
