= Erzsébet Gy. Németh =

Hungarian politician

Erzsébet Gy. Németh DM MGA
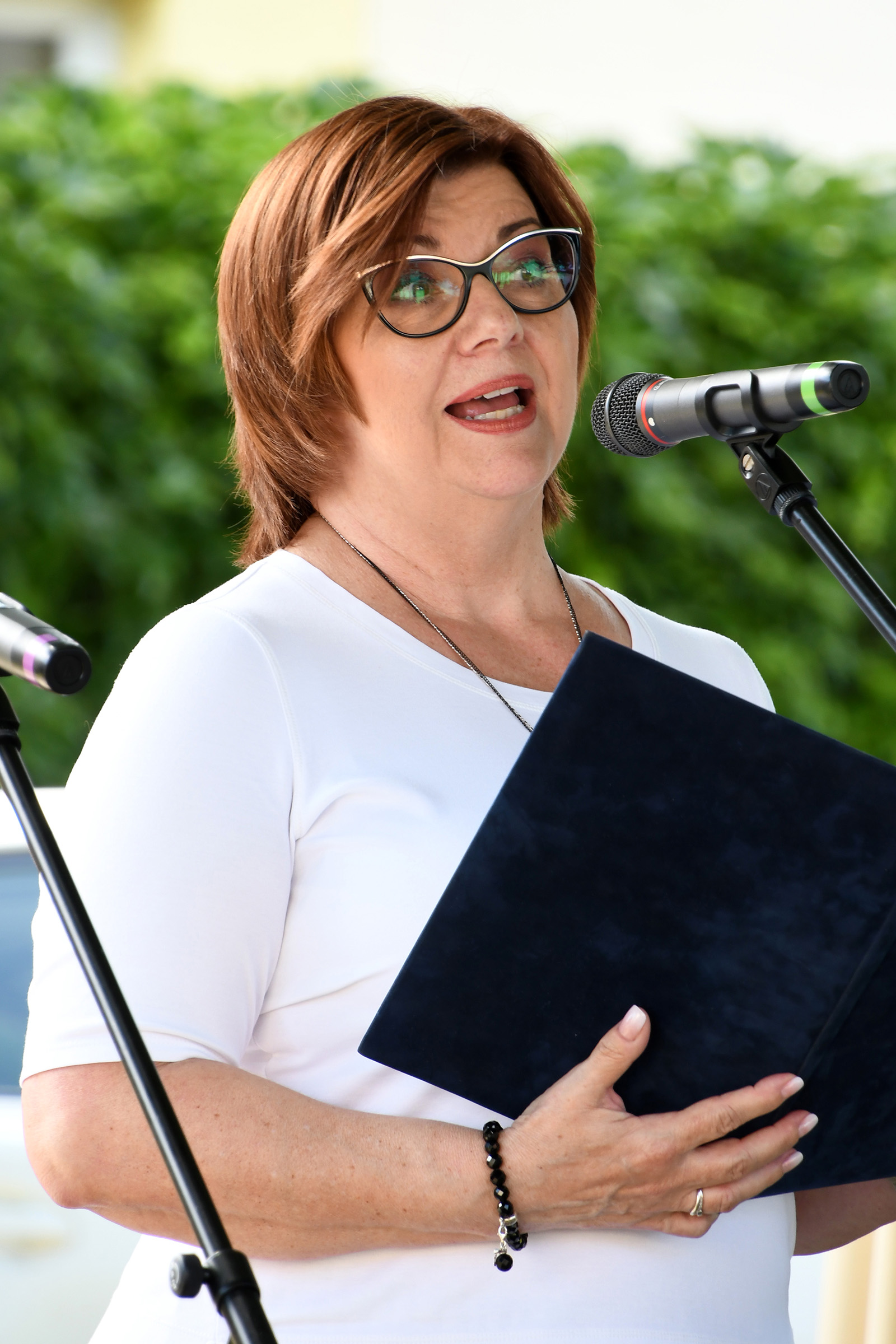
- Gy. Németh in 2021

Deputy Mayor of Budapest
- In office 5 November 2019 – 1 May 2022
- Succeeded by: Anett Bősz

Member of the National Assembly
- In office 15 May 2002 – 13 May 2010
- In office 2 May 2022 – 9 May 2026

Personal details
- Born: 21 January 1962 (age 64) Budapest, Hungary
- Party: DK
- Education: ELTE

Erzsébet Gy. Németh (born 21 January 1962) is a Hungarian politician. Previously she served as member of the National Assembly, member of the Budapest General Assembly and member of the board of the Democratic Coalition. From 2019, she is one of the deputy mayors of Budapest.

== Career ==
She graduated from the Miklós Steinmetz Grammar School in Budapest (now Gábor Sztehlo Evangelical Kindergarten, Primary School and Grammar School) and then graduated as a teacher of geography at the Primary School Teachers' Training College at the Eötvös Loránd University in 1988. She was involved in the pioneer movement since 1984. She was the leader of the election office of the Left Youth Association from 1989 to 1994.

She became an MSZP member in 1993, and a member of the General Assembly of the Capital City since 1994, where she served as the deputy leader of the MSZP's Budapest Fraction until 2000. In 2000 Gy. Németh became the leader of the MSZP's Budapest Fraction, serving in this position until 2006. She was candidate for the position of Mayor of Budapest in the 2002 mayoral election, but came to only the third place after Gábor Demszky and Pál Schmitt.

In 2006, she was elected as an MSZP Budapest List candidate on the national election. She unsuccessfully ran for mayor of Rákosmente (District XVII of Budapest) in 2014 and 2019 too, but was defeated by Levente Riz and Tamás Horváth, respectively. Gy. Németh ran for an individual seat in Újbuda Budapest 2nd constituency) during the 2018 parliamentary election, but was defeated by Fidesz candidate István Simicskó. She was appointed Deputy Mayor of Budapest for Human Policies in November 2019.

On the Hungarian Opposition Primary, 2021, she unsuccessfully ran as an individual constituency candidate. After she won a seat in the National Assembly on the 2022 Hungarian parliamentary election by being the 14th candidate on the national list of the joint opposition alliance United for Hungary, she gave up her deputy mayoral position, because under Hungarian law one cannot hold local governmental and national politician offices in the same time.
