= General Assembly of Budapest =

Budapest legislature

General Assembly of Budapest Fővárosi Közgyűlés

Type
- Type: Unicameral

Leadership
- Mayor: Gergely Karácsony, PM since 9 June 2024
- Deputy Mayor(s): vacant
- City Clerk: Tamás Számadó

Structure
- Seats: 33 Assembly Members
- Political groups: Governing coalition (7): DK (3); Párbeszéd (3); MSZP (1); Opposition (26): Fidesz–KDNP (10); Tisza (10); Podmaniczky Movement (3); MKKP (3)
- Committees: Human Resources and Foreign Relations; Budget; Finance and Monitoring; Public Procurement; Ownership, Economy and Public Space; Urban Development, Transport and Environment; Local Government and Police

Elections
- Voting system: Proportional representation
- Last election: 9 June 2024 (mayor)
- Next election: 2029

Meeting place
- Budapest City Hall; Városház Street 9-11; Budapest, H-1052; Hungary

Website
- www.budapest.hu

The General Assembly of Budapest (Hungarian: Fővárosi Közgyűlés, lit. 'Capital City Assembly' [ˈføːvaːroʃi ˈkøzɟyːleːʃ]) is a unicameral body consisting of 33 members, who are elected by proportional representation in a single citywide constituency with an electoral threshold of 5%, and the Mayor of Budapest (who is elected directly). Each term for the mayor and assembly members lasts five years.

== 2024 election results ==
=== Mayoral ===
Result of the mayoral election:

Candidate	Party	Votes	%
Gergely Karácsony	Dialogue–DK–MSZP	371,538	47.53
Dávid Vitézy	VDB–LMP	371,245	47.49
András Grundtner	Our Homeland Movement	38,984	4.99
Total		781,767	100.00
Valid votes		781,767	96.96
Invalid/blank votes		24,548	3.04
Total votes		806,315	100.00
Registered voters/turnout		1,333,795	60.45
Source: NVI

=== General Assembly ===
Party	Votes	%	+/–	Seats	+/–
Fidesz–KDNP	227,285	28.69		10	–3
Respect and Freedom Party	216,609	27.34	New	10	New
DK–MSZP–P	131,696	16.62		7	–6
VDB–LMP	80,402	10.15		3	+3
Hungarian Two-Tailed Dog Party	62,541	7.89		3	+3
Momentum Movement	39,471	4.98		0	–4
Our Homeland Movement	30,208	3.81		0	0
Hungarian Workers' Party	1,835	0.23		0	0
On the People's Side Party	1,315	0.17	New	0	New
Szolidaritás–LP7–HP	930	0.12	New	0	New
Total	792,292	100.00	–	33	–
Valid votes	792,292	98.29			
Invalid/blank votes	13,743	1.71			
Total votes	806,035	100.00			
Registered voters/turnout	1,333,795	60.43			
Source: NVI

== List of mayors ==
Election	Mayor	Party
1994	Gábor Demszky	Alliance of Free Democrats
1998	Gábor Demszky	Alliance of Free Democrats
2002	Gábor Demszky	Alliance of Free Democrats
2006	Gábor Demszky	Alliance of Free Democrats
2010	István Tarlós	Fidesz
2014	István Tarlós	Fidesz
2019	Gergely Karácsony	Dialogue
2024	Gergely Karácsony	Dialogue

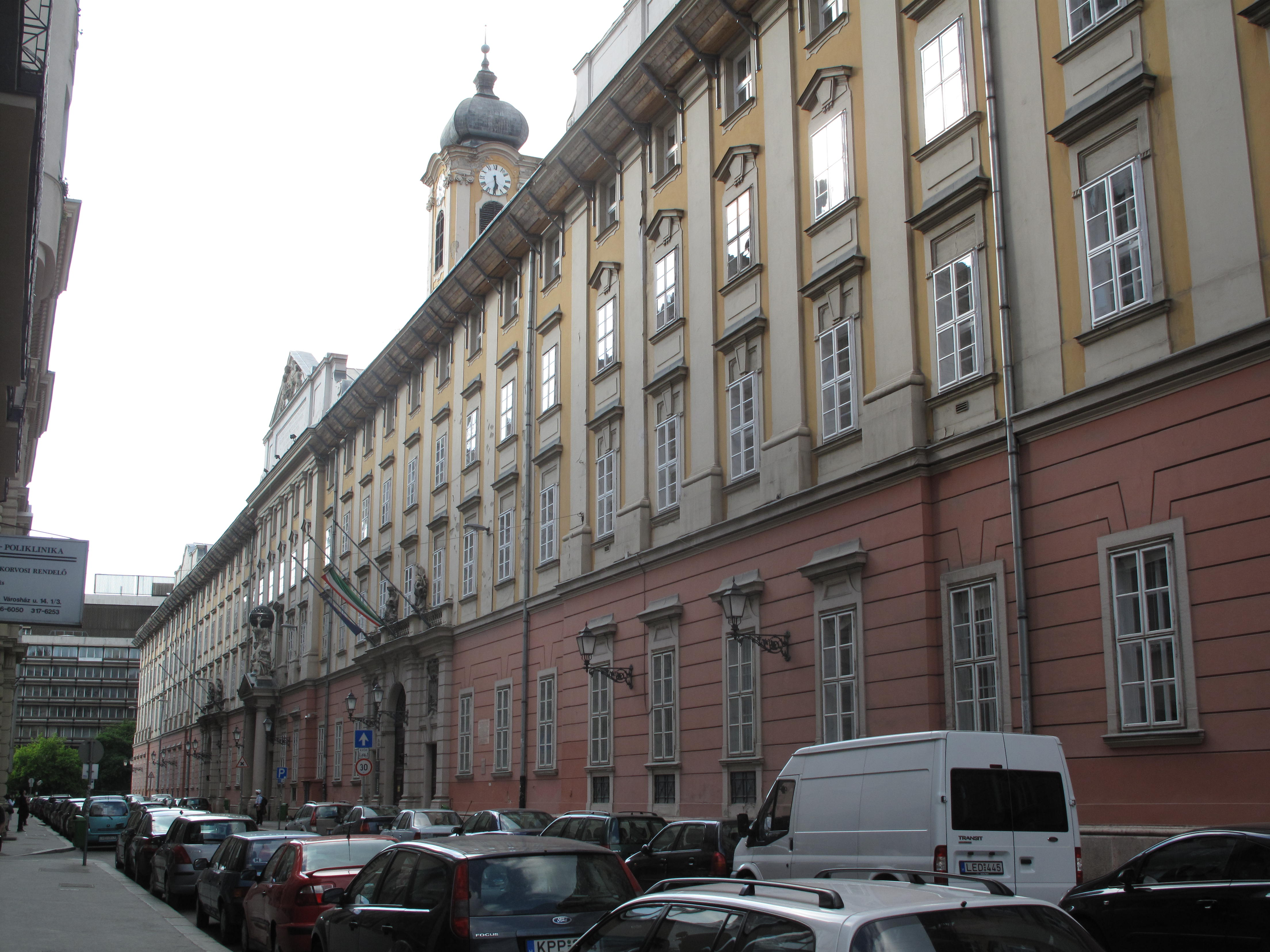
Budapest City Hall building near Deák Ferenc tér in Városház street, the office of Budapest's Mayor

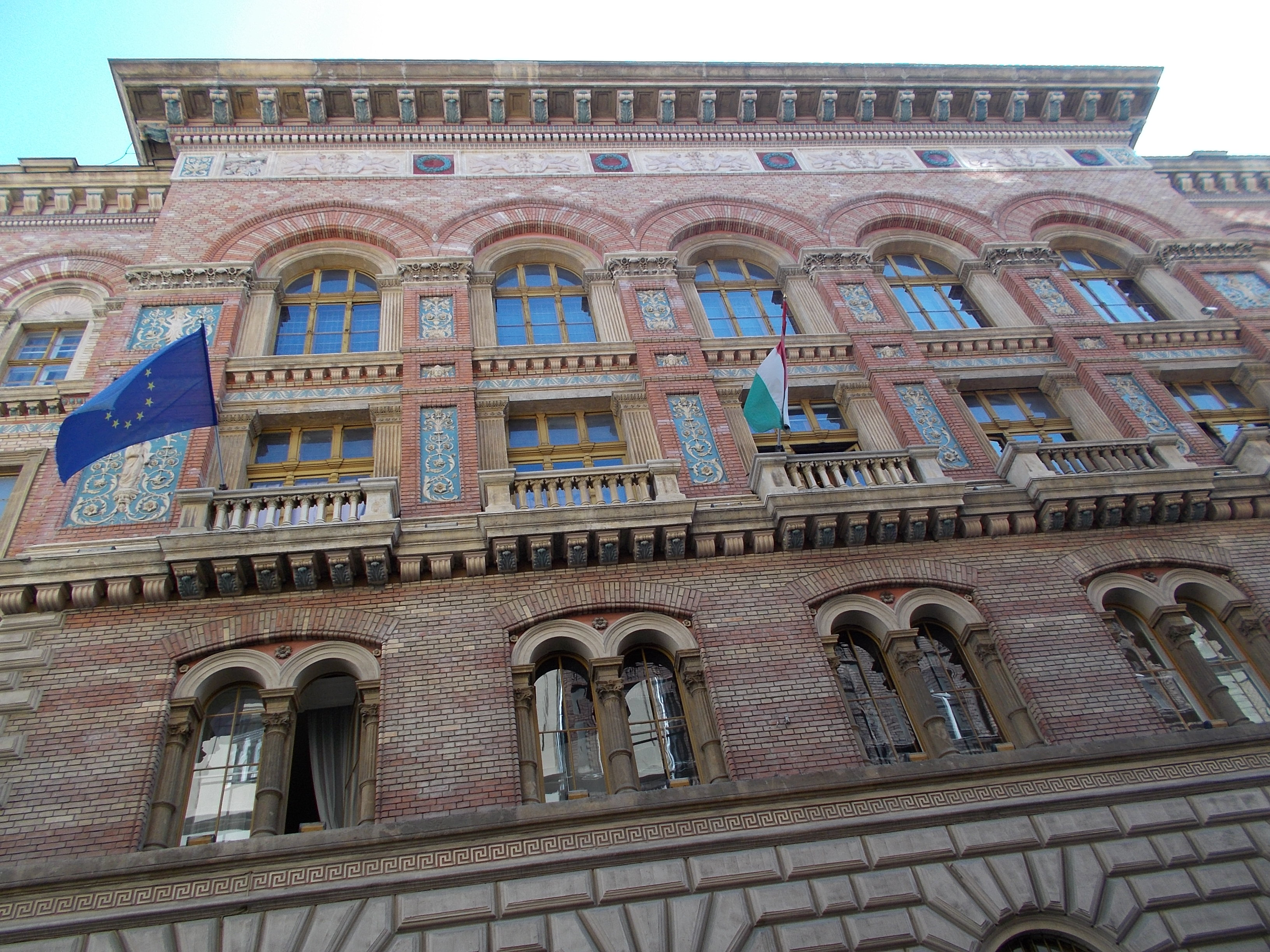
The eclectic building of New Budapest City Hall in Váci Street, the seat of the General Assembly

== Council history ==
	SZDSZ	MDF	Fidesz	KDNP	MSZP	PM	DK	LMP - P	FKGP - MIÉP	TISZA	MKKP
1990-1994	25	20	13	3	5						
1994-1998	19	19			21				7		
1998-2002	18	22			20				6		
2002-2006	16	21			24				5		
2006-2010	9	3	30		24				Jobbik		
2010-2014			17		10			3	3		
2014-2019			20		6	2	2	1	1		
2019-2024			13		18						
2024-2029			10		1	3	3	3		10	3

== Assembly members ==
Fraction	Members	Leader
Fidesz–KDNP	10 / 33	Anna Szepesfalvy
Tisza	10 / 33	Árpád István Orbán
Democratic Coalition (DK)	3 / 33	Sándor Szaniszló
Dialogue – The Greens' Party	3 / 33	Richárd Barabás
Podmaniczky Movement	3 / 33	József Gál
Hungarian Two-Tailed Dog Party (MKKP)	3 / 33	Krisztina Baranyi
Independent (MSZP)	1 / 33	

Fidesz–KDNP	TISZA	DK	Dialogue	Podmaniczky	MKKP	Independent
Anna Szepesfalvy; László Böröcz; Franciska Janó-Veilandics; Ádám Lehoczki; Dániel Szécsényi; Zoltán Havasi; Tibor Papp; Péter Böjthe; Gergely Kristóf Gulyás; Bence István György	Árpád István Orbán; Gabriella Gerzsenyi; György Bovier; Judit Annamária Barna; Kinga Kollár; Dániel Molnár; Balázs Balogh; Eszter Lakos; András Kulja; Szilvia Gémes	Sándor Szaniszló; Tibor Déri; Dorottya Keszthelyi	Gergely Karácsony (Mayor); Richárd Barabás; András Béres	József Gál; Anna Szilágyi Margit; Borbála Hutiray	Krisztina Baranyi; Gergely Kovács; Zsuzsanna Döme	Kata Tüttő (MSZP)

== Committees ==
	Human Resources and Foreign Relations	Urban Development Transport and Environment	Budget and Public Procurement	Ownership
President	Dorottya Keszthelyi (DK)	József Gál (Podmaniczky)	Krisztina Baranyi (MKKP)	Árpád Orbán István (TISZA)
Deputy President	Anna Szilágyi Margit (Podmaniczky)	Judit Barna Annamária (TISZA)	Árpád István Orbán (TISZA)	András Béres (Dialogue)
Representative Members	Judit Barna Annamária (TISZA); Döme Zsuzsanna (MKKP); Szilvia Gémes (Tisza); Anna Szepesfalvy (Fidesz)	Tibor Déri (DK); Richárd Barabás (Dialogue); Tibor Papp (Fidesz); Balázs Balogh (TISZA)	Borbála Hutiray (Podmaniczky); Sándor Szaniszló (DK); Péter Böjthe (Fidesz); Dániel Szécsényi (Fidesz)	Kinga Kollár (Tisza); Bence István György (Fidesz); Kata Tüttő (MSZP); Gergely Kovács (MKKP)
Non-representative Members	Géza Balog; Ádám Semer; Rafael Petróczi; Róbert Halmai; Csaba Falvai	Péter Biczók (TISZA); Bálint Ákos Dományi; Dániel Varga; Zoltán Várady; Tamás Andrejszki (TISZA)	Tamás Elekes; Márton Havas; Károly Deschelák; Dániel Kaltenecker; Imre Vas	Károly Lukoczki; Péter Galambos; Ádám Ruszinkó; György Soós; Attila Soltész

== See also ==
- National Assembly (Hungary)
- Budapest
