= 2019 Budapest mayoral election =

Budapest mayoral election in 2019

- 13 October 2019
- Turnout: 51.47%
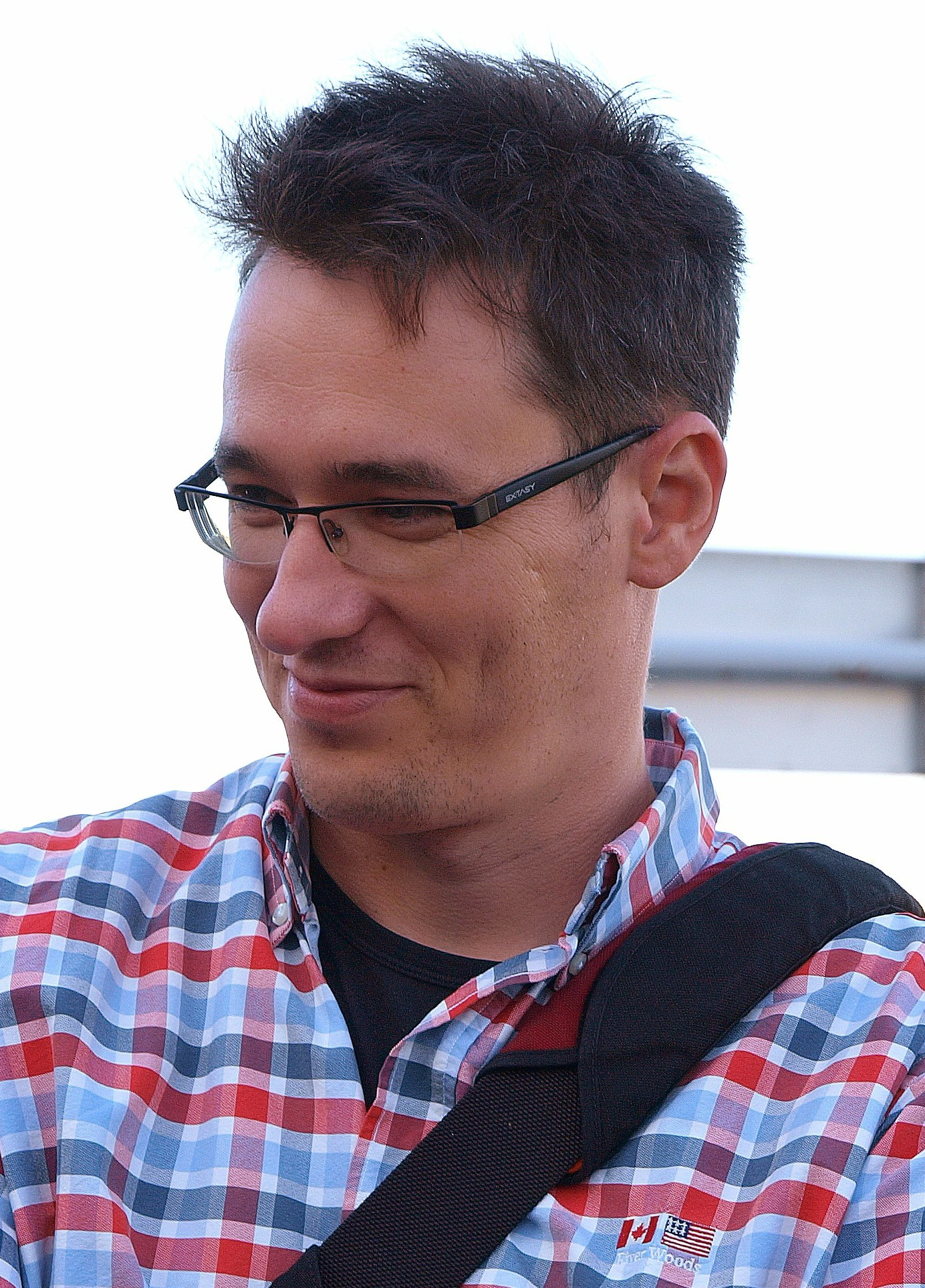

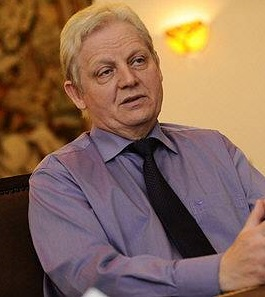
| Candidate | Gergely Karácsony | István Tarlós |
| Party | Párbeszéd | Independent |
| Alliance | Momentum–DK–MSZP–Párbeszéd–LMP | Fidesz–KDNP |
| Vote | 353,593 | 306,608 |
| Percentage | 50.86% | 44.10% |
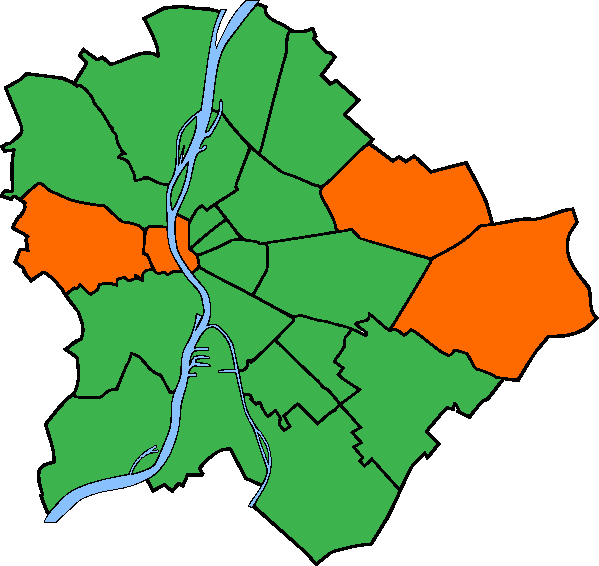
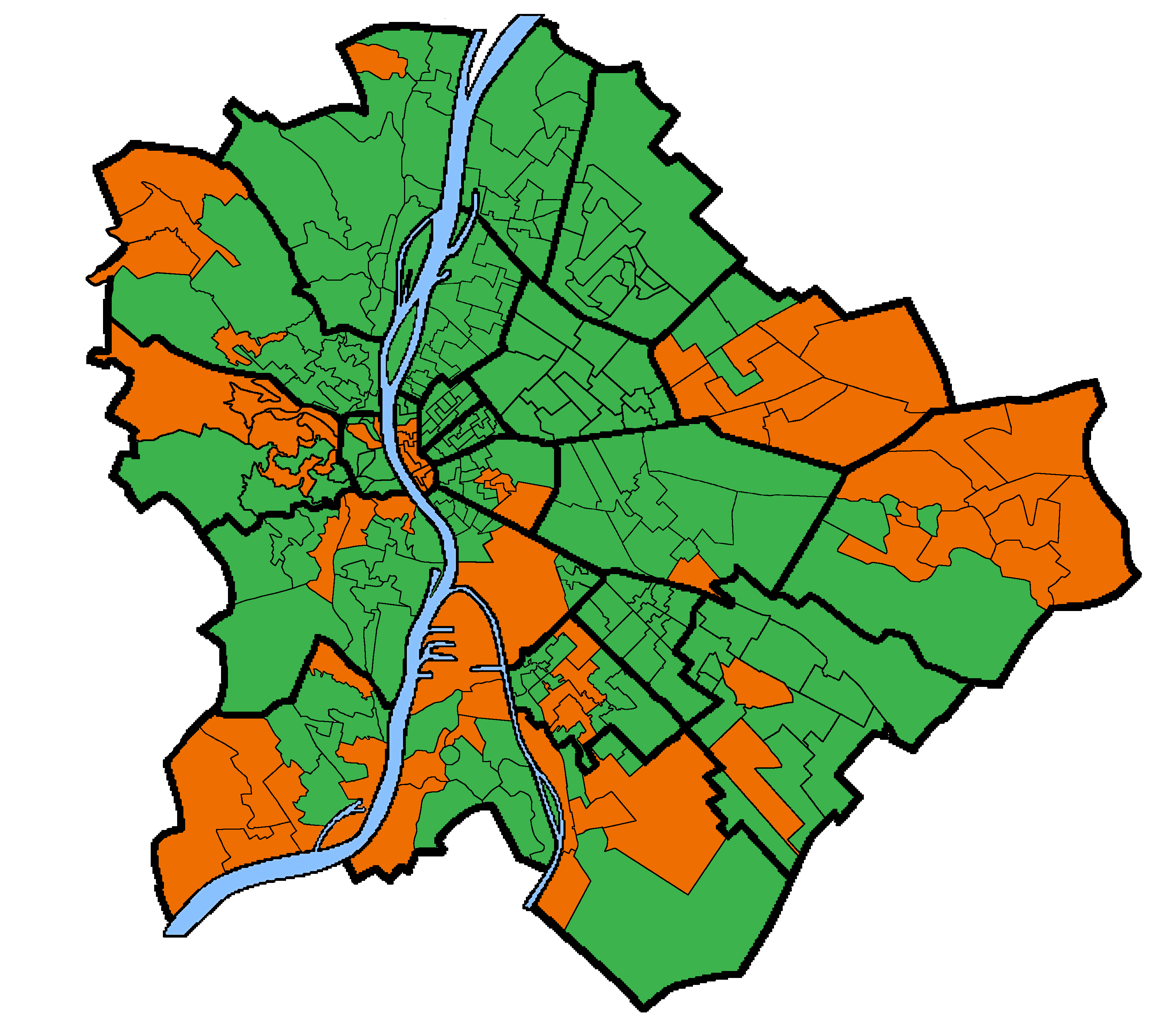
- Green denotes districts won by Karácsony, while orange denotes districts won by Tarlós.
Mayor before election
István Tarlós
Fidesz–KDNP
Elected Mayor
Gergely Karácsony
Dialogue

The 2019 Budapest mayoral election was held on 13 October 2019 to elect the Mayor of Budapest (főpolgármester). On the same day, local elections were also held throughout Hungary, including the districts of Budapest which will determine the composition of the General Assembly. The election is run using a first-past-the-post voting system. The winner of the election will serve for a term of five years.

== Candidates ==
On 10 October 2018, István Tarlós announced that he will run for a third term as Mayor, after negotiating about his future role with Prime Minister Viktor Orbán. Also in October, independent publicist Róbert Puzsér declared his run for the mayorship, and published his manifesto Walking Budapest.

=== Opposition primary ===
In December 2018, the Hungarian Socialist Party reached an agreement with independent candidate Róbert Puzsér about a two-round primary. According to that, there would be a first round (in February), where the socialists and their allies would participate, and a second round (in June) where the "candidate of the centre" would join them.

The first round was conducted between 28 January and 3 February. Two candidates participated: Csaba Horváth (MSZP group leader in the General Assembly) and Gergely Karácsony (Dialogue, mayor of Zugló).

Budapest mayoral primary - first round
| Party | Candidate | Votes | % |
|---|---|---|---|
| PM | Gergely Karácsony | 27,598 | 80.66% |
| MSZP | Csaba Horváth | 6,535 | 19.10% |
| Total votes | | 34 214 | 100.0% |

After the first round, a second round between Karácsony and Puzsér was planned in July. Opposition parties Politics Can Be Different and Jobbik endorsed Puzsér, with the condition that he takes part in the primary. Multiple forums and debates were held between the two, but on 8 April Puzsér announced he would not take part, citing a recent agreement about district mayoral candidates which did not include the parties supporting him.

The European Parliament election caused a major change in the balance of power, as the Socialists-Dialogue alliance gained only 6% of the votes, with the Democratic Coalition taking 16% and new party Momentum (M) taking almost 10%. This prompted Momentum to announce their candidate, entrepreneur Gábor Kerpel-Fronius (hu) on 3 June, followed by the Democratic Coalition on 6 June, their candidate being television host Olga Kálmán.

The second round was conducted between 20 and 26 June with online and in-person voting. On 23 June a televised debate was held between the three candidates on the channel ATV.

Budapest mayoral primary - second round
| Party | Candidate | Votes | % |
|---|---|---|---|
| PM | Gergely Karácsony | 33,356 | 48.79% |
| DK | Olga Kálmán | 25,093 | 36.71% |
| Momentum | Gábor Kerpel-Fronius | 9,792 | 14.32% |
| Total votes | | 68,363 | 100.0% |

According to the organizers' self-imposed criteria, the primary was valid, as more than 50 000 valid votes were cast.

== Opinion polling ==
| Pollster/client(s) | Date(s) conducted | Sample size | | | | | | | | | | |
| Pollster/client(s) | Date(s) conducted | Sample size | Tarlós | Karácsony | Kálmán | Kerpel-Fronius | Puzsér | Berki | Thürmer | Sermer | Neither | Don't know |
|---|---|---|---|---|---|---|---|---|---|---|---|---|
| Medián | 2-4 Oct 2019 | 1000 | 48% | 47% | – | – | 5% | – | – | – | – | – |
| Iránytű | 11-21 Sep 2019 | 1000 | 37% | 35% | – | – | 4% | 1% | – | – | 8% | 14% |
| Nézőpont | 11-21 Sep 2019 | 1000 | 53% | 40% | – | – | 7% | 0% | – | – | – | - |
| Publicus / Népszava | 9–14 Sep 2019 | 1000 | 37% | 34% | – | – | 4% | 0% | – | – | – | 25% |
| Nézőpont | 4–14 Sep 2019 | 1000 | 50% | 42% | – | – | 7% | 1% | – | – | – | – |
| Republikon | 5-12 Sep 2019 | 800 | 35% | 34% | – | – | 5% | 1% | – | – | - | 25% |
| Závecz | 2–5 Sep 2019 | 800 | 49% | 45% | – | – | 4% | 1% | 1% | – | – | – |
| Nézőpont | 23–27 Aug 2019 | 500 | 51% | 43% | – | – | 6% | – | – | – | – | – |
| Publicus / Népszava | 11–14 Jun 2019 | 800 | 27% | 26% | – | – | 5% | – | – | 1% | 5% | 32% |
| Publicus / Népszava | 11–14 Jun 2019 | 800 | 28% | – | 20% | – | 4% | – | – | 1% | 8% | 34% |
| Publicus / Népszava | 11–14 Jun 2019 | 800 | 28% | – | – | 15% | 6% | – | – | 1% | 10% | 34% |

== Results ==
2019 Budapest mayoral election
| Party | Candidate | Votes | % | ±% |
|---|---|---|---|---|
| Momentum–DK–MSZP–PM–LMP | Gergely Karácsony | 353,593 | 50.86% | N/A |
| Fidesz–KDNP | István Tarlós | 306,608 | 44.10% | −4.96% |
| Independent | Róbert Puzsér | 30,972 | 4.46% | N/A |
| Independent | Krisztián Berki | 4,045 | 0.58% | N/A |
| Total votes | | 695,218 | 100.0% | |
