= Mayor of Budapest =

Highest ranking elected official in Budapest, Hungary

Lord Mayor of Budapest
- Budapest főpolgármestere
- Coat of arms of Budapest

- Flag of Budapest

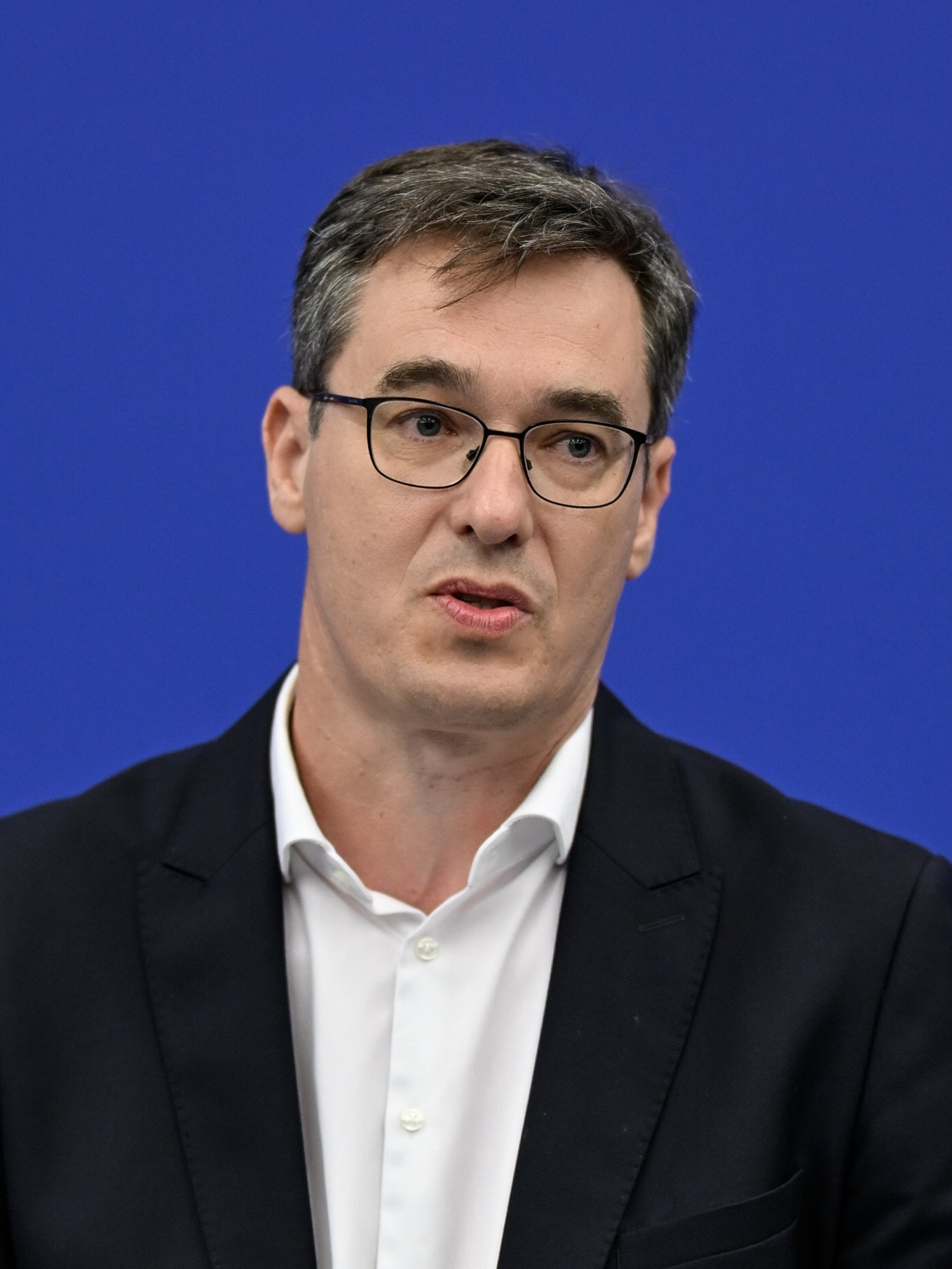
- Incumbent; Gergely Karácsony since 13 October 2019
- Office of the Lord Mayor
- Member of: General Assembly of Budapest
- Seat: Budapest City Hall
- Term length: Five years, no term limit
- Constituting instrument: City Unification Act (1872)
- Inaugural holder: Károly Kamermayer
- Formation: 4 November 1873
- Deputy: Vice-Mayor
- Salary: 62,431 USD annually
- Website: Budapest.hu

The Lord Mayor of Budapest (Hungarian: Budapest főpolgármestere, pronounced [ˈbudɒpɛʃt ˈføːpolɡaːrmɛʃtɛrɛ]) is the head of the General Assembly of Budapest, Hungary, elected directly for 5-year term since 2014 (previously, municipal elections were held quadrennially). Until 1994, the mayor was elected by the General Assembly. The office was called President of the Council of the Capital Budapest (Hungarian: Budapest főváros tanácselnöke) between 1950 and 1990, during the Hungarian People's Republic.

The position is known as Lord Mayor (Hungarian: főpolgármester) to distinguish the office from that of the mayors (Hungarian: polgármesterek) who lead each of Budapest's 23 districts. Between 1873 and 1945, the Lord Mayor of Budapest was the royal government's representative in the city and the head of the capital's municipal authority, a position analogous to the Lord-Lieutenants of Counties (Hungarian: ispánok).

== History ==
=== Austria-Hungary ===
The newly elected 400-member General Assembly of Budapest held its inaugural session on 25 October 1873, as a major step in the unification process of Buda and Óbuda on the west bank, with Pest on the east bank of the river Danube. The assembly elected the first Lord Mayor among the three candidates nominated by countersignature of King Francis Joseph I after consultations with the Ministry of Interior. On 30 October 1873, four candidates selected by an election commission headed by Lord Mayor Károly Ráth for the position of Mayor. According to the city unification law (Statute XXXVI of 1872), the Mayor of Budapest was head of the local government, while the Lord Mayor became representative of the executive branch (the government) to establishing a two-tier local government system in Budapest. On 4 November 1873, Károly Kamermayer was elected the first Mayor of Budapest, obtaining 297 votes of the total of 348 votes.

The mayor, the two deputy mayors and the other senior officials were elected for a term of six years by a simple majority of General Assembly. The Law on classification of civil servants (Statute I of 1883) required legal and political science graduate from the office-holder. Consequently, the position was rather administrative than political position during the dual monarchy of Austria-Hungary. Until 1945, the majority of the mayors were civil servants who were passing through the promotion ladder during their careers. The mayor also served as head of the executive council which prepared and presented cases to the General Assembly, and was responsible for financial and property management too. As Chairman of the General Assembly, the Mayor of Budapest also substituted the Lord Mayor in case of obstacles. A lot of administrative scope concentrated in the hands of the mayor (civil registration of births, marriages, citizenship naturalization, authorisation of water management etc.). Thus the administrative system of Budapest was often called as "water-headed". By 1899 some corrections were made: few minor administrative cases assigned to lower-ranking committees and councils. The mayor could exert significant influence through the appointment of the administrative staff, which also depended on the mayor's personality and habit. For instance, Mayor István Bárczy personally directed the affairs of Budapest in practice, while the council meetings gradually became formal.

=== Interwar period and aftermath ===
During the dual monarchy, Budapest had much greater autonomy than other towns in countryside, thus the Lord Mayor had much less jurisdiction than Ispáns (or Lord Lieutenants) of the counties. It was because of the restricted suffrage and virilism which secured wide room for maneuver for the upper middle class and the elite senior administrative bureaucracy. This tendency had crucially been changed after the defeat in World War I and the outbreak of the Aster Revolution on 31 October 1918. Budapest became the main scene of revolutionary activity. Following the formation of the Hungarian Soviet Republic in March 1919, Mayor Tivadar Bódy was deposed and the Communist regime set up an Executive Committee to administer the capital city. After the collapse of the Soviet Republic, Admiral Miklós Horthy entered Budapest at the head of the National Army on 16 November 1919. He was greeted by the recurrent Bódy and other city officials in front of the Hotel Gellért. In a fiery speech horthy accused the capital's citizens of betraying Hungary by supporting Bolshevism. On the other hand, after the abolishment of virilism and expansion of suffrage in 1920, a party-based political system has evolved in the General Assembly of Budapest, which became more democratic and liberal than other parts of Hungary.

This phenomenon has caused several jurisdictional conflicts between the Hungarian government and the General Assembly of Budapest during the era of Prime Minister István Bethlen in the 1920s. Both 1920 and 1924 municipal laws sought to limit the capital's autonomy. The most important manifestation of this intention was the expansion of the Lord Mayor's powers, who could initiate the dissolution of the General Assembly after the adoption of that laws. On 1 April 1920, Jenő Sipőcz was appointed Government Commissioner, outranking Mayor Tivadar Bódy. Bethlen's Unity Party was also trying to extend its influence over Károly Wolff's Christian Municipal Party which gained an absolute majority in the 1920 local election in Budapest. The United Municipal Civic Party was founded in 1924 in order to offset Wolff's influence. In practise the party functioned as the Budapest branch of the governing Unity Party.

The Statute XVIII of 1930 completely reorganized Budapest's administrative structure in the spirit of centralization. 32 life members were elected to the General Assembly by a caucus appointed by the Lord Mayor, the government's representative. The government of Gyula Gömbös launched a new offensive against the General Assembly. After the adoption of the Statute XII of 1934, the election result of the position of the Mayor and his two deputies had to be confirmed by the head of state, Regent Miklós Horthy.

== Mayors of Budapest (1873–present) ==
#	Portrait	Name (birth–death)	Term of office		Political party (political coalition)
Mayors of Budapest (1873–1950)
1		Károly Kamermayer (1829–1897)	4 November 1873	25 November 1896	Independent
2		József Márkus (1852–1915)	25 November 1896	25 October 1897	Independent
3		János Halmos (1847–1907)	8 November 1897	17 February 1906	Independent
4		István Bárczy (1866–1943)	19 June 1906	10 April 1918	Independent
5		Tivadar Bódy (1868–1934)	10 April 1918	24 March 1919	Independent
Budapest was governed by an Executive Committee during the Hungarian Soviet Republic
–		Ferenc Harrer (1874–1969) contested by Tivadar Bódy	1 August 1919	6 August 1919	Independent
(5)		Tivadar Bódy (1868–1934)	7 August 1919	1 September 1920	Independent
6		Jenő Sipőcz (1878–1937)	1 September 1920	28 November 1934	Independent
7		Károly Szendy (1885–1953) deposed	14 December 1934	30 April 1944	Independent
8		Ákos Farkas (1894–1955)	19 May 1944	23 December 1944	NYKP-HM
Collapse of the local government during the Siege of Budapest
9		János Csorba (1897–1986)	19 January 1945	16 May 1945	FKGP
10		Zoltán Vas (1903–1983)	16 May 1945	28 November 1945	MKP
11		József Kővágó (1913–1996) acting until 14 December	28 November 1945	5 June 1947	FKGP
12		József Bognár (1917–1996)	18 July 1947	20 June 1949	FKGP
13		Kálmán Pongrácz (1898–1980)	20 July 1949	15 June 1950	MDP
Chairmen of the Council of Budapest (1950–1990)
(13)		Kálmán Pongrácz (1898–1980) acting until 3 November	15 June 1950	31 October 1956	MDP/MSZMP
(11)		József Kővágó (1913–1996)	31 October 1956	4 November 1956	FKGP
(13)		Kálmán Pongrácz (1898–1980)	4 November 1956	16 November 1958	MSZMP
14		József Veres (1906–1993)	12 December 1958	11 March 1963	MSZMP
15		István Sarlós (1921–2006)	11 March 1963	1 December 1970	MSZMP
–		Lajos Kelemen (1923–2008) acting	1 December 1970	7 May 1971	MSZMP
16		Zoltán Szépvölgyi (1921–2006)	7 May 1971	17 December 1986	MSZMP
17		Pál Iványi (1942–)	1 January 1987	20 December 1988	MSZMP
18		József Bielek (1934–2008)	10 February 1989	18 September 1990	MSZMP
(Lord) Mayors of Budapest since 1990
19		Gábor Demszky (1952–)	31 October 1990	3 October 2010	SZDSZ
20		István Tarlós (1948–)	3 October 2010	13 October 2019	Fidesz
21		Gergely Karácsony (1975–)	13 October 2019	Incumbent	Dialogue

== Elections ==
=== 2024 ===
- 2024 Budapest mayoral election

Overview of interim results
Candidate	Party	9 June Initial result		14 June Recount of invalid votes		12 July Recount of valid votes - Final result	
Candidate	Party	Votes	%	Votes	%	Votes	%
Gergely Karácsony	Dialogue–DK–MSZP	371,467	47.53	371,578	47.51	371,538	47.53
Dávid Vitézy	VDB–LMP – Hungary's Green Party	371,143	47.49	371,537	47.50	371,245	47.49
András Grundtner	Our Homeland Movement	38,943	4.98	38,995	4.99	38,984	4.99
Total		781,553	100.00	782,110	100.00	781,767	100.00
Valid votes		781,553	96.95	782,110	97.02	781,767	96.96
Invalid/blank votes		24,589	3.05	24,041	2.98	24,548	3.04
Total votes		806,142	100.00	806,151	100.00	806,315	100.00

=== 2019 ===
2019 Budapest mayoral election
Party	Candidate	Votes	%	±%
Momentum–DK–MSZP–PM–LMP	Gergely Karácsony	353,593	50.86%	N/A
Fidesz–KDNP	István Tarlós	306,608	44.10%	−4.96%
Independent	Róbert Puzsér	30,972	4.46%	N/A
Independent	Krisztián Berki	4,045	0.58%	N/A
Total votes		695,218	100.0%	

=== 2014 ===
- 2014 Budapest mayoral election

Candidate	Party	Votes	%	+/–
István Tarlós	Fidesz-KDNP	290,675	49.06	–4.31
Lajos Bokros	Modern Hungary Movement	213,550	36.04	New
Gábor Staudt	Jobbik	42,093	7.10	–0.17
Antal Csárdi	Politics Can Be Different	33,689	5.69	–4.20
Zoltán Bodnár	Hungarian Liberal Party	12,461	2.10	New
Total		592,468	100.00	–

=== 2010 ===
- 2010 Budapest mayoral election

Candidate	Party	Votes	%	+/–
István Tarlós	Fidesz-KDNP	321,908	53.37	+8.17
Csaba Horváth	Hungarian Socialist Party	177,783	29.47	–17.39 (Note: Compared to the SZDSZ-MSZP candidate in the previous election.)
Benedek Jávor	Politics Can Be Different	59,638	9.89	New
Gábor Staudt	Jobbik	43,839	7.27	New
Total		603,168	100.00	–

=== 2006 ===
2006 Budapest mayoral election
Party	Candidate	Votes	%	±%
SZDSZ	Gábor Demszky	362 289	46.86%	+0.16%
Independent	István Tarlós	349 412	45.20%	+9.35%^{[a]}
MDF	Kálmán Katona	46 367	6.00%	N/A
MIÉP	László Zsinka	10 791	1.40%	−1.86%
Workers' Party	Péter Székely	4 212	0.54%	+0.12%
Total votes		773 071	100.0%	

=== 2002 ===
2002 Budapest mayoral election
Party	Candidate	Votes	%	±%
SZDSZ	Gábor Demszky	348 534	46.70%	−11.52%
Independent	Pál Schmitt	267 563	35.85%	−3.12%^{[a]}
MSZP	Erzsébet Gy. Németh	98 289	13.17%	N/A
MIÉP	István Csurka	24 341	3.26%	N/A
Centre	György Droppa	4 404	0.59%	N/A
Workers' Party	Lajosné Karacs	3 121	0.42%	−2.38%
Total votes		754 674	100.0%	

=== 1998 ===
1998 Budapest mayoral election
Party	Candidate	Votes	%	±%
SZDSZ	Gábor Demszky	373 969	58.22%	+21.94%
Fidesz	János Latorcai	250 335	38.97%	+10.54%
Workers' Party	Pál Kollát	18 008	2.80%	+0.65%
Total votes		642 312	100.0%	

=== 1994 ===
1994 Budapest mayoral election
Party	Candidate	Votes	%	±%
SZDSZ	Gábor Demszky	215 374	36.28%	
KDNP	János Latorcai	168 731	28.43%	
MSZP	Etele Baráth	155 365	26.17%	
FKGP	János Szabó	33 651	5.67%	
Workers' Party	Pál Kollát	12 767	2.15%	
Republican Party	György Magyar	7 706	1.30%	
Total votes		593 594	100.0%	

== Sources ==
- Sipos, András (2008). ""Dualizmus" a főváros élén. A főpolgármesteri és a polgármesteri intézmény, 1873–1950". In Feitl, István (ed.). A főváros élén. Budapest főpolgármesterei és polgármesterei, 1873–1950 [=At the Helm of the Capital: Lord Mayors and Mayors of Budapest, 1873–1950] (in Hungarian). Napvilág Kiadó. pp. 11–26. ISBN 978-963-9697-19-5.
