= 2002 Budapest mayoral election =

Mayoral election in Hungary

← 1998	20 Oct 2002	2006 →
- Turnout: 52.68%
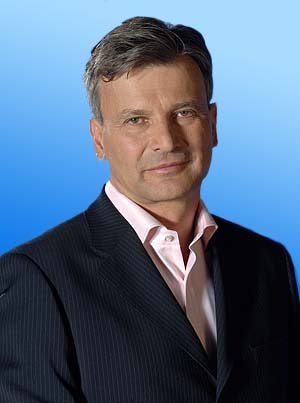

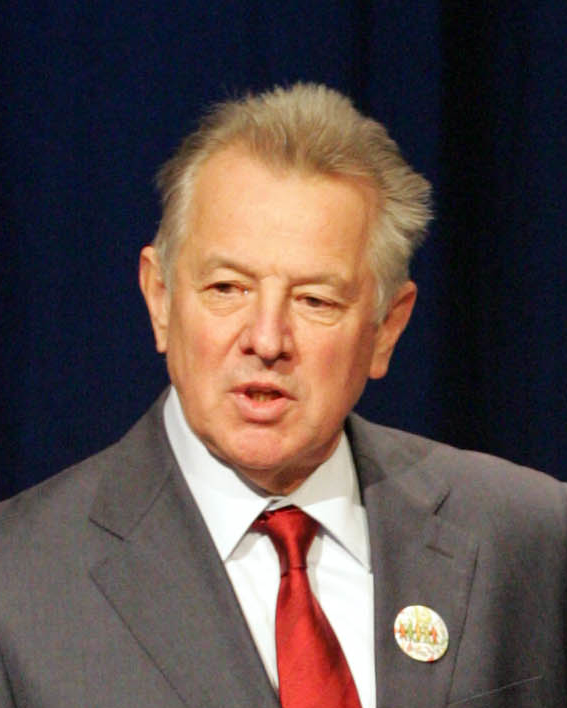

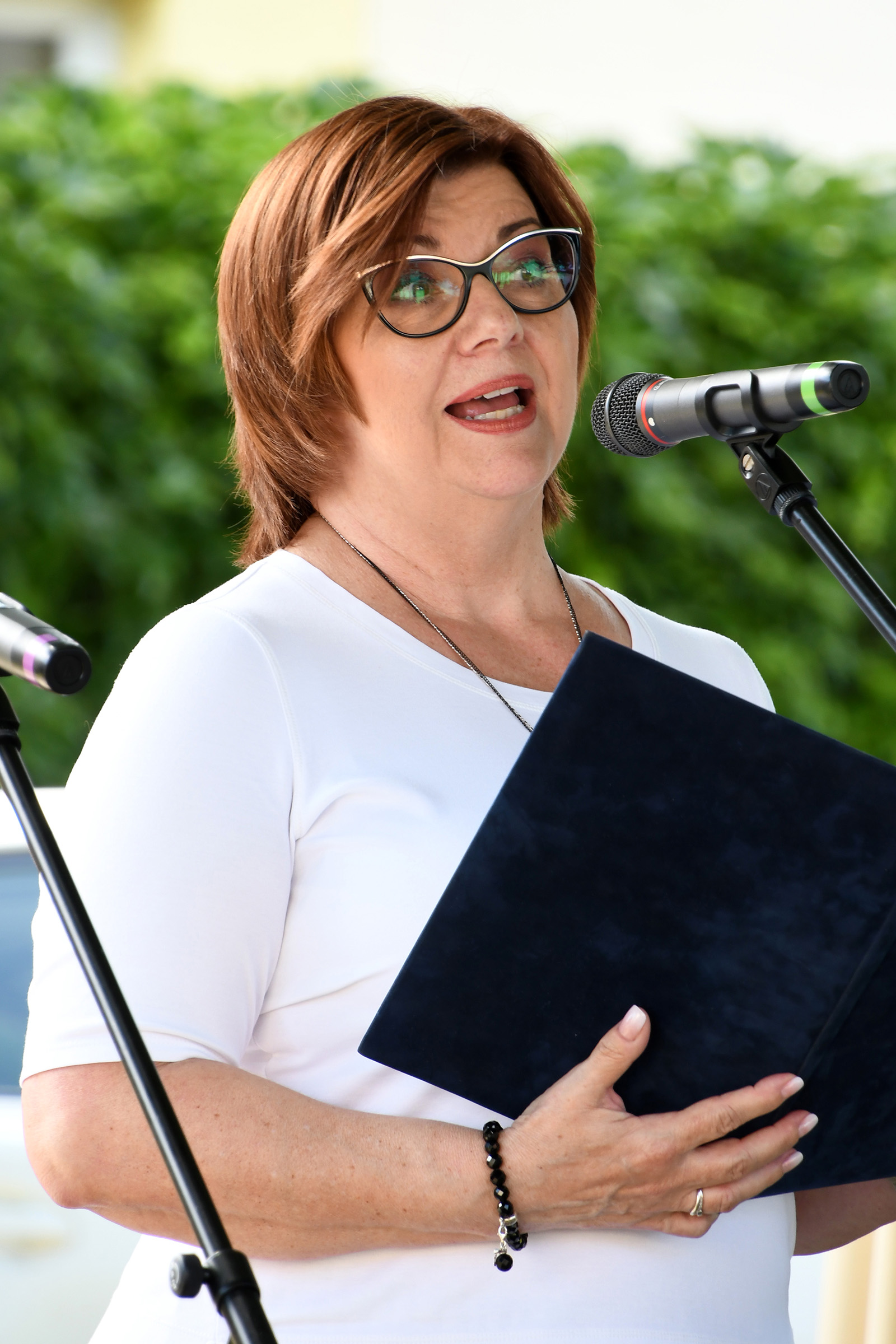
Candidate	Gábor Demszky	Pál Schmitt	Erzsébet Gy. Németh (hu)
Party	SZDSZ	Independent	MSZP
Alliance		Fidesz
Vote	348 534	267 563	98 289
Percentage	46.70%	35.85%	13.17%
Mayor before election
Gábor Demszky
SZDSZ
Elected Mayor
Gábor Demszky
SZDSZ

The 2002 Budapest mayoral election was held on 20 October 2002 to elect the Mayor of Budapest (főpolgármester). On the same day, local elections were held throughout Hungary, including the districts of Budapest. The election was run using a First-past-the-post voting system. The winner of this election served for 4 years.

The election was won by three-time incumbent, Gábor Demszky.

== Results ==
2002 Budapest mayoral election
Party	Candidate	Votes	%	±%
SZDSZ	Gábor Demszky	348 534	46.70%	−11.52%
Independent	Pál Schmitt	267 563	35.85%	−3.12%^{[a]}
MSZP	Erzsébet Gy. Németh	98 289	13.17%	N/A
MIÉP	István Csurka	24 341	3.26%	N/A
Centre	György Droppa	4 404	0.59%	N/A
Workers' Party	Lajosné Karacs	3 121	0.42%	−2.38%
Total votes		754 674	100.0%	

== Notes ==
a. Compared to Fidesz candidate in the previous election
