= Flag of Budapest =

Hungarian municipal flag

City of Budapest
- Proportion: 2:3
- Adopted: 15 September 2011
- Design: Budapest's coat of arms on a white field, with alternating red and green triangles on the top and bottom edges

The flag of Budapest is the official municipal flag of Budapest, Hungary. The current design features the city's coat of arms on a white field. The top and bottom edges of the flag are occupied by alternating red and green isosceles triangles. It has been in effect since 15 September 2011, following a decree from the General Assembly of Budapest.

== Design and symbolism ==
Flag construction sheet

The 11 triangles (6 red, 5 green) on the top and bottom edges span the whole length of the flag and have a height of one-tenth that of the flag. The colours red, white, and green represent the national colours of Hungary, as featured on the nation's flag. The colours as used on Hungary's flag symbolize strength (red), faithfulness (white), and hope (green). The coat of arms, first created in 1873, depicts two castles on a red field, with the one-tower castle on top representing Pest, and the three-towered castle on the bottom representing Buda and Óbuda. Separating the two castles is a wavy white line, representing the Danube. Surrounding this shield is a lion on its hind legs to the left and a mythological gryphon to the right. On top of the shield is the Holy Crown of Hungary. The shield is about one-third the height of the flag.

== Gallery ==
=== Historical flags of Budapest ===
Flag of Buda (until 1873)

Flag of Pest (until 1873)

Proposed flag of Budapest (1873)

Proposed flag of Budapest (1873)

Flag of Budapest (1873–1930)

Proposed flag of Budapest (1929)

Flag of Budapest (1930–1949)

Flag of Budapest (1984–1990)

Flag of Budapest (1990–2011)

Flag of Budapest in 2011

Current flag of Budapest since 2011
