= Gergely Karácsony =

Hungarian politician and Mayor of Budapest (born 1975)

Gergely Karácsony M MGA
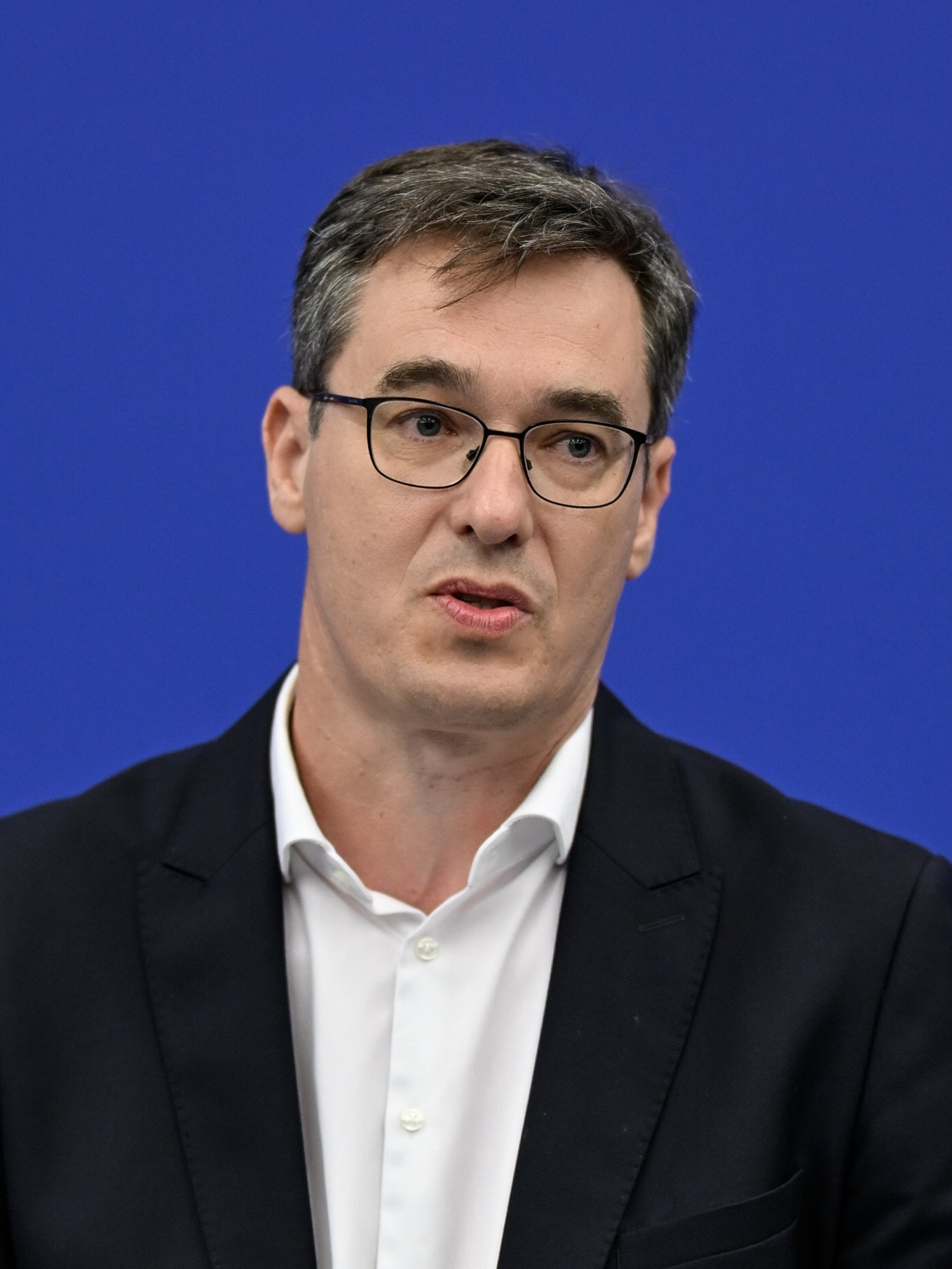
- Karácsony in 2025

Mayor of Budapest
- Incumbent
- Assumed office 13 October 2019
- Preceded by: István Tarlós

Mayor of Zugló District XIV, Budapest
- In office 12 October 2014 – 13 October 2019
- Preceded by: Ferenc Papcsák
- Succeeded by: Csaba Horváth

Member of the National Assembly
- In office 14 May 2010 – 5 May 2014
- In office 8 May 2018 – 28 May 2018

Personal details
- Born: Gergely Szilveszter Karácsony; 11 June 1975 (age 51) Fehérgyarmat, Hungary
- Party: Dialogue for Hungary (since 2013); LMP (2009–2013)
- Other political affiliations: United for Hungary (2020–2022)
- Spouse: Virág Kiss
- Children: 1
- Education: Eötvös Loránd University (BA)
- Profession: Political scientist, politician

Gergely Szilveszter Karácsony (Note: Hungarian pronunciation: [ˌɡɛrɡɛj ˌsilvɛstɛr ˈkɒraːt͡ʃoɲ]) (born 11 June 1975) is a Hungarian politician, sociologist, political scientist, activist and the current Mayor of Budapest. He previously served as member of the National Assembly (MP) from 2010 to 2014 and Mayor of Zugló from 2014 to 2019.

== Profession ==
Karácsony worked for the Medián market and public opinion research company as a research manager. He became Director of Research in 2007. Between 2002 and 2008 he was a political advisor at the Prime Minister's Office. In addition to that, he worked as a teaching assistant at the Corvinus University of Budapest from 2004, an assistant lecturer from 2007 and an assistant professor from 2008.

In May 2021, the Hungarian Office of Education (Oktatási Hivatal) opened an investigation into his appointments as assistant lecturer and assistant professor at Corvinus University. In September, the Office concluded that he did not meet some requirements related to language certificates and doctoral studies required by the university's policy.

== Political career ==
Karácsony became a member of the newly formed Politics Can Be Different (LMP) party in 2009. During the 2010 parliamentary election he served as campaign manager of the party. He became a Member of Parliament from the Budapest regional list (3rd place). In May 2010 he was elected deputy leader of the LMP parliamentary fraction. As a result he left the Medián firm.

Karácsony was the party's candidate at the Budapest District II by-election in November 2011. He came third with 6.45 percent after Zsolt Láng (Fidesz) and Katalin Lévai (MSZP). Both MSZP and LMP agreed that the candidate who received fewer votes would withdraw in favour of the stronger one; however, Karácsony also participated in the run-off.

In January 2013, the LMP's congress rejected electoral cooperation with other opposition forces, including Together 2014. As a result, members of LMP's "Dialogue for Hungary" platform, including Karácsony, announced their decision to leave the opposition party and form a new organisation. Benedek Jávor, leader of the "Dialogue for Hungary" platform, said the eight MPs leaving LMP would keep their parliamentary mandates. The departing MPs established Dialogue for Hungary (Hungarian: Párbeszéd Magyarországért, or PM) as a full-fledged party.

In June 2014, Karácsony was elected co-chair of Dialogue for Hungary (PM) alongside Tímea Szabó, when his predecessor Jávor became a Member of the European Parliament (MEP) in the 2014 European Parliament election. Karácsony won the mayoral election in Zugló during the 2014 local elections as a joint candidate of the Hungarian Socialist Party, Democratic Coalition, and the Together 2014–Dialogue for Hungary alliance. According to the new rules, he also became a member of the General Assembly of Budapest.

In April 2017, Karácsony was re-elected co-leader of the Dialogue for Hungary and was also appointed as his party's candidate for the position of prime minister in the 2018 parliamentary election. The Hungarian Socialist Party also elected Karácsony as their candidate for the position of prime minister in December 2017. The two parties also decided to jointly contest the 2018 national election. Consequently, Together have terminated their cooperation agreement with the Dialogue for Hungary. Under the leadership of Karácsony, the MSZP–PM joint list received 11.91% and came only third after Fidesz and Jobbik.

=== Mayor of Budapest ===
==== First term (2019–2024) ====
In June 2019, in the opposition's first primary election, he was elected as the opposition (MSZP-P-DK-Momentum-LMP-MLP)'s candidate. While Jobbik did not endorse Karácsony outright, the party opted not to run a candidate against him. This left Karácsony as the sole opposition candidate for the position of Lord Mayor of Budapest in the 2019 local elections, against incumbent Lord Mayor István Tarlós, who was supported by the ruling coalition, Fidesz–KDNP. He then went on to win the election on 13 October 2019 with 50.86% of the votes being cast in his favor, with Tarlós receiving 44.10%.

On Karácsony's initiative, the mayors of the capitals of all four Visegrád Group countries signed the Pact of Free Cities in Budapest in December 2019. The pact promotes "common values of freedom, human dignity, democracy, equality, rule of law, social justice, tolerance and cultural diversity".

He gained international popularity in 2021 when he renamed four streets in Budapest to "Free Hong Kong Street", "Uyghur Martyrs Street", "Dalai Lama Street" and "Bishop Xie Shiguang Street" in protest of the Hungarian government's decision to open a branch of China's Fudan University in Budapest. In 2019, the university had formally changed its educational status and philosophy, notably removing the phrase "academic independence and freedom of thought" and including "commitment to follow the leadership of the Communist Party". Fudan's Budapest campus was thus considered by Karácsony and thousands of Hungarian citizens who had protested against the opening of the university as a sign of a pernicious expansion of Chinese influence in Hungary.

Karácsony called Budapest a "republic" and an “island of freedom" during his term. He argued that the Fidesz government had made the equivalent of a declaration of war on the city due to their defeat in the 2019 election. The social values against which the government oriented its policies were present in Budapest, he added. Karácsony emphasized that, in addition to the COVID-19 pandemic and the global energy crisis, the Fidesz government took a lot of powers and financial resources away from Budapest in the 2019–2024 term purely for political reasons, which made the city budget unstable. Thus, the implementation of many municipal projects was delayed or became impossible. During his re-launch campaign, Karácsony argued that Budapest's future would be decided by the city's ability to provide affordable housing in the short and long term. In this regard, he wanted to rely on directly callable EU funds, bypassing the government's distributive role. Karácsony argued that he had demonstrated his ability to cooperate with the Hungarian government after a common tariff system was established with the participation of Hungarian State Railways (MÁV), Volánbusz and Budapesti Közlekedési Zrt. Under Karácsony, the BuBi bicycle-sharing network was also re-organized and expanded. Karácsony established a housing agency that provides municipal housing for the homeless. The reconstruction of Metro Line M3 was completed under his term, but the lack of accessibility and air-conditioning remained an unfulfilled campaign promise. The Széchenyi Chain Bridge and Blaha Lujza tér were also renovated.

==== Second term (2024–present) ====
On 9 June 2024, Karácsony ran for and won a second term as mayor of Budapest in the 2024 Budapest mayoral election, narrowly beating LMP candidate Dávid Vitézy, who was backed by Fidesz candidate Alexandra Szentkirályi, after she left the race two days before the election due to poor polling performance.

In late May 2025, Karácsony held a press conference in which he claimed that Budapest was on the brink of bankruptcy, and that the Hungarian Government was demanding the capital municipality pay 50 billion forint to pay the "Solidarity Tax", which was a tax paid by wealthier municipalities to distribute money to less wealthy municipalities. This tax has significantly risen since Karácsony became mayor, with him calling this rise in tax a political move by the government. He also asked for legal protection from the courts to avoid the government from taking this unpaid tax money from the municipality’s accounts. The government then deducted 10.2 billion forint from the municipality, which Karácsony deemed illegal, and asked the city-owned public transport company, the Budapesti Közlekedési Központ (BKK), to make a plan to conserve money in case more money was deducted. He also said that all public transport operated by the BKK would completely halt for 10 minutes on the 6th of June between 11:50 AM and 12:00 PM, as a protest against the government's actions against the municipality. Around this time, the CEO of BKK, Walter Katalin, resigned from his office, due to pressure around corruption claims. Then, on 17 June 2025, the courts granted financial protection to the Budapest municipality, and ordered that the Hungarian State Treasury return the 10.2 billion forint taken from the city.

When the Hungarian Pride parade ban was put into law on 18 March 2025, Karácsony was completely against the ban, and claimed that Budapest Pride would still happen that year, and that it "could be bigger than ever." He then travelled to the 2025 Vienna Pride parade, where he made a speech in which he claimed that "if Pride can be banned in an EU member state, then no EU citizen is safe". Karácsony then declared that Budapest Pride would be classified as a municipal event, meaning that the police would not have the authority to ban it, which the police did anyway. The parade took place despite the ban, with around 100,000 people attending. Karácsony attended the parade, with him making a speech near the end of the event. He also got into some controversy when some people accused him of making the Nazi salute whilst making the speech, which was echoed by far-right Anti-Islam Dutch politician Geert Wilders, with him saying that Karácsony made an "antisemitic Nazi gesture". However, this was disproven, as a recording of Karácsony's speech from a different angle showed that he was not doing a Nazi salute, but rather pointing to the Carmelite Monastery of Buda, the official seat of the Prime Minister of Hungary, whilst saying "You (Viktor Orbán) have no power over us." Karácsony responded to Wilders' allegations by saying on X, formerly Twitter, "I'm pointing toward the office of your ideological ally while saying: 'You have no power over us.' 200,000 free Hungarians understood perfectly."

On 1 August 2025, Karácsony was questioned by Hungarian police at the National Investigation Bureau on his involvement in the Budapest Pride parade earlier that year. Karácsony then made a speech after the questioning, saying that he did not answer any of the police’s questions, instead choosing to read out a statement of his legal position, which was that given the event was a municipal event, it did not apply to the law banning events of that nature. He said he found it surreal that someone can be tried for a municipal or local event, whilst “thieves of public funds, embezzlers of 100 billions” are not even being dealt with. On 28 January 2026, prosecutors charged Karácsony for organizing Budapest Pride last year, despite it being banned by assembly law.

=== Opposition primary ===
In May 2021, six opposition parties formed a coalition against Fidesz and Viktor Orbán in the 2022 national elections. Karácsony ran as the prime ministerial candidate of three parties (PM, MSZP and LMP) in the 2021 primary election. During his candidacy, he announced the establishment of a cross-party political movement called 99 Movement (Hungarian: 99 Mozgalom) on 15 May 2021. Karácsony mentioned the following as its main policy goals:

Our purpose and faith are no more, no less: the dethronement of 1 percent of the privileged few for the benefit and benefit of the 99 percent majority. To replace the people of power with the power of the people. For Hungary to breathe, to calm down and to be a common home for all of us. ... The next chapter of Hungary will be the history of all Hungarians. Instead of a country decorated around today's privileged people, we are creating a homeland that offers everyone a chance, a future and a happy life. It is time to build a new policy that represents the interests of 99% of the country instead of 1% of the richest.

He also stressed that he wanted a country where no one considers the other a traitor, where there is no need to choose between homeland and progress, nation and Europe, Budapest and the countryside.

Karácsony came in second in the first round of the opposition primary (27.3%) and, beside a few places in the countryside, he could only win in the constituencies of Budapest, where he is serving as mayor (altogether 15 constituencies). Following a week-long negotiation and political tactics, beside the result of opinion polls, Karácsony dropped out and endorsed Péter Márki-Zay, who came in third place and eventually won the second round against Klára Dobrev and became the nominee of the opposition for the position of prime minister in the 2022 parliamentary election. Political analysts described his withdrawal as a political failure, which, for the first time, has stalled his upward career since 2010. Before the opposition primary, Karácsony was considered the towering favorite of the primary, who in recent years has built an image of the face of the opposition. The ruling party Fidesz also targeted him with a negative campaign (the slogan "Stop Gyurcsány, stop Karácsony!") during the primary. According to experts, Karácsony launched his campaign late, did not campaign in the summer (unlike his opponents), had no strong message and was prematurely focused on the 2022 election and defeating Viktor Orbán.

Political offices
Preceded by Ferenc Papcsák	Mayor of Zugló; 2014–2019	Succeeded by Csaba Horváth
Preceded by István Tarlós	Mayor of Budapest; 2019–present	Incumbent
Party political offices
Preceded by Tímea Szabó	Co-President of Dialogue for Hungary; 2014–2022; Served alongside: Tímea Szabó	Succeeded by Rebeka Szabó
Preceded by Benedek Jávor	Co-President of Dialogue for Hungary; 2014–2022; Served alongside: Tímea Szabó	Succeeded by Bence Tordai
