= 2006 Budapest mayoral election =

Mayoral election in Hungary

- 1 October 2006
- Turnout: 55.89%
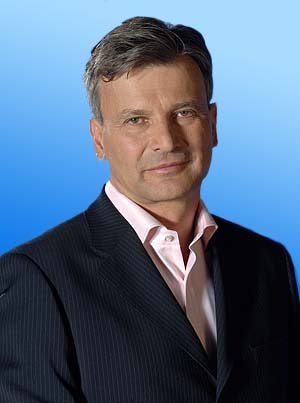

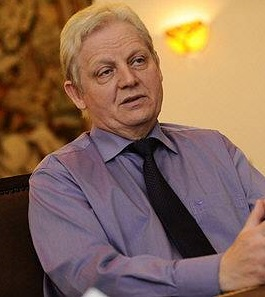
Candidate	Gábor Demszky	István Tarlós
Party	SZDSZ	Independent
Alliance	SZDSZ - MSZP	Fidesz–KDNP
Vote	362 289	349 412
Percentage	46.86%	45.20%
Mayor before election
Gábor Demszky
SZDSZ
Elected Mayor
Gábor Demszky
SZDSZ

The 2006 Budapest mayoral election was held on 1 October 2006 to elect the Mayor of Budapest (főpolgármester). On the same day, local elections were held throughout Hungary, including the districts of Budapest. The election was run using a First-past-the-post voting system. The winner of this election served for four years.

The election was won by four-time incumbent, Gábor Demszky.

== Results ==
2006 Budapest mayoral election
Party	Candidate	Votes	%	±%
SZDSZ	Gábor Demszky	362 289	46.86%	+0.16%
Fidesz–KDNP	István Tarlós	349 412	45.20%	+9.35%^{[a]}
MDF	Kálmán Katona	46 367	6.00%	N/A
MIÉP	László Zsinka	10 791	1.40%	−1.86%
Workers' Party	Péter Székely	4 212	0.54%	+0.12%
Total votes		773 071	100.0%	

== Notes ==
a. Compared to the independent candidate endorsed by Fidesz in the previous election
