= Gábor Staudt =

Hungarian politician

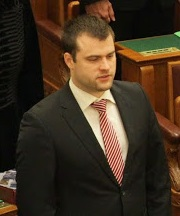
- Gábor Staudt in 2014

Member of the National Assembly
- In office 14 May 2010 – 31 January 2019

Personal details
- Born: 10 May 1983 (age 43) Budapest, Hungary
- Party: Jobbik (since 2004)
- Profession: jurist, politician

Gábor Staudt (born 10 May 1983) is a Hungarian jurist and politician of the right-wing Jobbik. He served as a member of the National Assembly (MP) from 2010 to 2019. He was the Jobbik's candidate for the position of mayor of Budapest in the 2010 and 2014 local elections.

== Profession ==
Gábor Staudt was born in Budafok-Tétény (22nd district of Budapest) into a Roman Catholic on 10 May 1983. He finished is secondary studies at the Kempelen Farkas Secondary Grammar School of Budafok-Tétény in 2002, where he also served as president of the student government for two years. He obtained doctorate in law from the Eötvös Loránd University (ELTE) in 2007. He served as president of the student self-government of the faculty in 2005. He took a legal examination in 2012. He earned a degree of master of laws in international and European law at the Eötvös Loránd University in 2015.

== Political career ==
Staudt was member of the German minority self-government of the 22nd district from 2002 to 2010. He joined the Jobbik and established its local branch in Budafok-Tétény in 2004, presiding the branch since then. Staudt also led the party's ethics and discipline committee after 2006. He was a candidate of the MIÉP–Jobbik Third Way Alliance of Parties in Budafok-Tétény (Budapest 32nd constituency) during the 2006 parliamentary election, where received 3.5 percent of the vote and came to fourth and last place in the first round after Ildikó Lendvai (MSZP), Zoltán Németh (Fidesz) and István Lányi (SZDSZ). Staudt was elected to the representative body of Budafok-Tétény in the 2006 local elections, serving in this capacity until 2010. He was chairman of the Committee on Culture, Sport and Tourism.

As head of the legal office of the Jobbik, Staudt took part in shaping the party's election program for the 2010, 2014 and 2018 parliamentary elections. He was elected a Member of Parliament via the national list of the Jobbik. He was involved in the Committee on Constitutional Affairs, Judiciary and Procedure from 2010 to 2014. He was the Jobbik's candidate in the 2010 Budapest mayoral election. He came to the fourth and last place, receiving 7.27 percent. Staudt served as president of the Jobbik's Budapest branch from 2010 to 2011.

Staudt ran for an individual seat in Budafok-Tétény (Budapest 18th constituency) in the 2014 and 2018 parliamentary elections, but came to the third place both times with 12.18 and 9.17 percent, respectively. He secured a mandate via the Jobbik's national list in both elections. He again ran for the position of mayor in the 2014 Budapest mayoral election. He came to the third place with 7.1 percent. In the parliament, he was a member of the Legislative Committee from 2014 to 2018 and the Committee on Legal Affairs from 2015 to 2019. He also functioned as vice-chairman of the latter committee between 2016 and 2019. Staudt served as a deputy leader of the Jobbik parliamentary group from October 2015 to May 2018 and from September 2018 to January 2019. Staudt was re-elected MP via the Jobbik's national list in the 2018 parliamentary election.

Staudt resigned from his parliamentary seat on 18 December 2018, citing reasons of privacy. His mandate has expired on 31 January 2019. He was replaced by Tamás Csányi. The Fidesz-backed Magyar Nemzet falsely claimed in November 2020 that the prosecutor's office prosecuted a VAT fraud case in which a witness testified that Gábor Staudt was involved and that was the reason he resigned three years earlier. Staudt won the rectification lawsuit against Magyar Nemzet.
