= Tímea Szabó =

Hungarian politician

Tímea Szabó MP
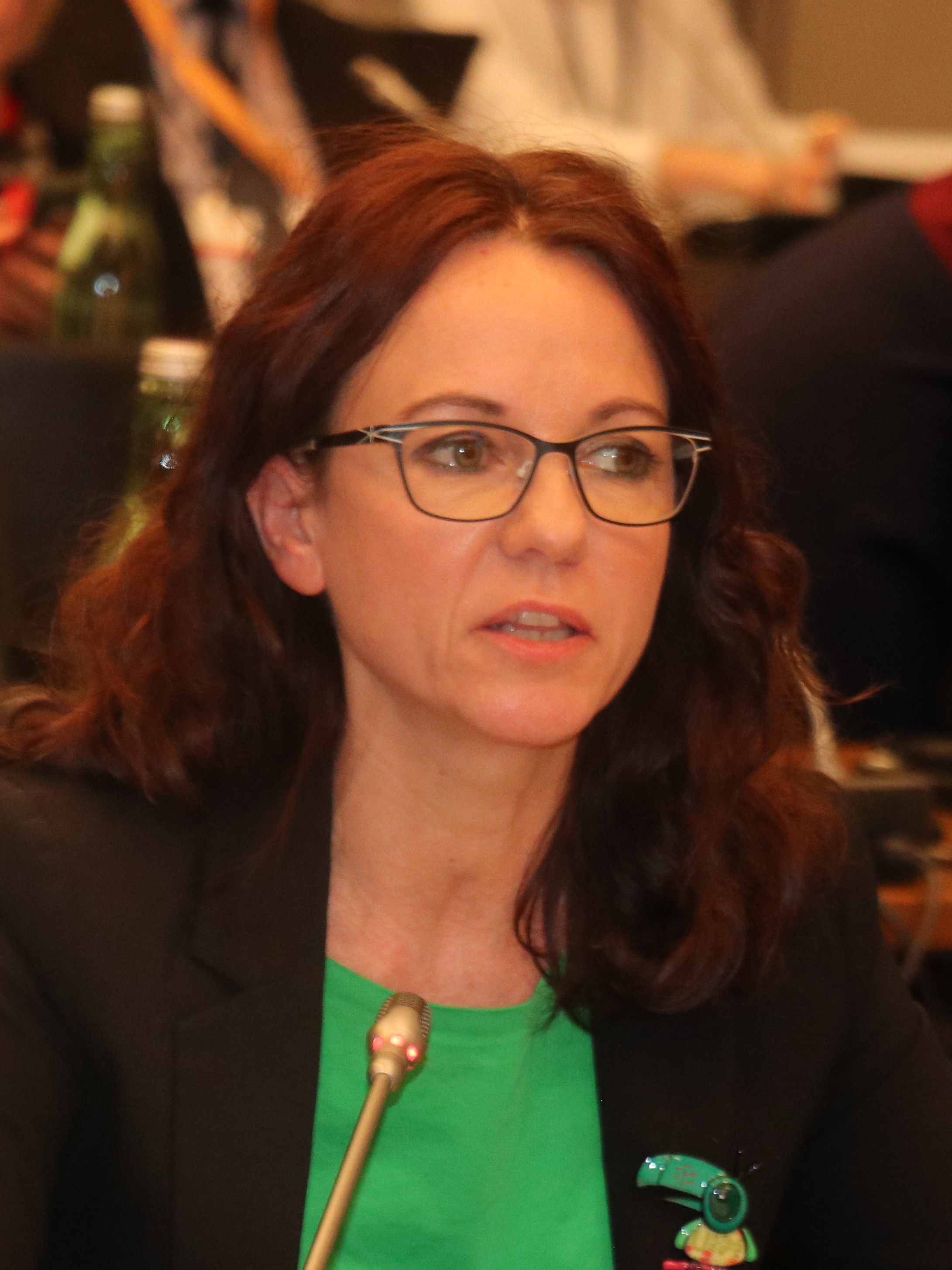
- Tímea Szabó in 2024

Member of the National Assembly
- In office 14 May 2010 – 8 May 2026
- Constituency: Budapest 10
- Majority: 6,614 (11,79%)

Personal details
- Born: 18 January 1976 (age 50) Budapest, Hungary
- Party: LMP (2009–2013); Dialogue (2013–present)
- Children: 2
- Profession: Humanitarian worker, journalist, politician

Tímea Szabó (born 18 January 1976) is a Hungarian humanitarian worker, journalist and politician. She was a member of the National Assembly (MP) from 2010 to 2026. She was first elected via the Politics Can Be Different (LMP) National List, and since the 2014 election as a member of Dialogue for Hungary (PM).

She served as co-president of the Dialogue for Hungary since the formation of the party in February 2013 until July 2022. She also functioned as the leader of the party's parliamentary group from 2018 to 2024, with a brief interruption. She has been the managing co-leader of the party, beside the two co-leaders, since February 2024.

== Biography ==
=== Research career ===
Szabó graduated from the University of Szeged (communication) in 2001. According to her, she attended Harvard Law School although there is no record of her at the Harward Registrar's Office. She worked as a journalist for British and American newspapers and news agencies and reported on Hungary for five years. Later she joined a research program in the Harvard Law School where she became research manager. She conducted research on armed conflict-prevention strategies and protection of vulnerable groups, commissioned by the United Nations (UN).

She worked for three months in Pakistan at the civic organization of International Rescue Committee, where she dealt with the issues of Afghan refugees, among others. She returned to Boston a week before the September 11 attacks, where she conducted research in connection with the peaceful settlement of the Afghan conflict after the outbreak of war. After the end of American bombings, she moved to Afghanistan and participated in the United Nations Assistance Mission in Afghanistan (UNAMA) on behalf of Harvard University. She was responsible for the development of a new Afghan government. Few months later she joined CARE International.

=== Political career ===
Szabó moved back to Hungary in 2003 and joined the Hungarian Helsinki Committee in 2004, where she coordinated the refugee program for four years. She was a founding member of the LMP party between 2009 and 2013. She led the common list of the Politics Can Be Different with the Humanist Party (HP) in the 2009 European Parliament election. She was elected to the National Assembly from the party's National List during the 2010 Hungarian parliamentary election. She served as Vice-chairperson of the Committee on Human Rights, Minority, Civic and Religious Affairs between May 14, 2010 and February 11, 2013. After party split, she became a member of the same committee on February 25, 2013.

In January 2013, the LMP's congress rejected the electoral cooperation with other opposition forces, including Together 2014, for the second time. As a result, members of LMP's “Dialogue for Hungary” platform, including Tímea Szabó, announced their decision to leave the party and form a new organization. Benedek Jávor said the eight MPs leaving LMP would keep their parliamentary mandates. The leaving MPs established Dialogue for Hungary as a full-fledged party.

The Dialogue for Hungary (PM) held its inaugural congress on 17 February 2013. Szabó was elected co-president of the party, alongside Benedek Jávor. The congress also authorized the party's presidency to open the negotiations with Together 2014. On 8 March 2013, the PM party entered into an alliance with Together 2014, which officially formed as a political party. Gordon Bajnai said the two parties will run on a joint ticket and field joint candidates for prime minister and deputies in the country's next parliamentary election in Spring 2014. Jávor and Szabó, co-chairs of PM also became members of Together 2014's board.

On 14 January 2014, left-wing opposition parties agreed to submit a joint list (Unity) for the spring general election. Co-leader of the Dialogue for Hungary (PM) Tímea Szabó was placed fifth on the joint national list of the MSZP, E14-PM, DK and Liberals. She was elected MP in the 2014 national election and did not join any parliamentary groups. She became a member of the Committee on Welfare. She ran as a joint individual candidate of the Dialogue for Hungary and the Hungarian Socialist Party (MSZP) in the 2018 Hungarian parliamentary election. She defeated Fidesz candidate Erzsébet Menczer and became MP for Óbuda-Békásmegyer (Budapest Constituency X). Her party was able to form a parliamentary group and she was elected leader of the party's caucus.

Szabó was selected as the candidate of the joint opposition alliance United for Hungary in Óbuda-Békásmegyer constituency during the 2021 opposition primary for the upcoming 2022 Hungarian parliamentary election. Szabó supported the candidacy of Péter Márki-Zay during the competition of prime minister-candidates. She defeated Fidesz candidate Balázs Bús in the election, defending his parliamentary mandate. Since the opposition alliance suffered a heavy defeat, Szabó announced she will not run for the party presidency in the next PM party leadership election, which is due in the summer of 2022. Szabó was also replaced as leader of the party's parliamentary group by Bence Tordai in May 2022. She resumed the position in September 2022, when Tordai was elected co-leader of the party. She held the office until January 2024, when she was elected managing co-leader of the party responsible for the implementation of strategy and operational tasks, beside the two co-leaders. Tordai succeeded her as caucus leader again.

She initially run as MP for Óbuda–Békásmegyer again, but withdrew her candidacy in favor of Tisza Party during the 2026 Hungarian parliamentary election.

== Personal life ==
Her ex-husband is Gábor Hunyadi, a former member of Jobbik and the party's delegate to the National Election Committee during the 2010 parliamentary election. Hunyadi joined the neo-Nazi movement Hungarian Dawn (based on the Greek Golden Dawn) in 2012. Their son is Gergő.

Party political offices
Preceded by New party	Co-President of Dialogue for Hungary; 2013–2022; Served alongside: Benedek Jávor (2013–2014); Gergely Karácsony (2014–2022)	Succeeded by Rebeka Szabó; Bence Tordai
National Assembly of Hungary
Preceded by First	Leader of the PM parliamentary group 2018–2022	Succeeded by Bence Tordai
Preceded by Bence Tordai	Leader of the PM parliamentary group 2022–2024	Succeeded by Bence Tordai
