= 1994 Budapest mayoral election =

- 11 Dec 1994
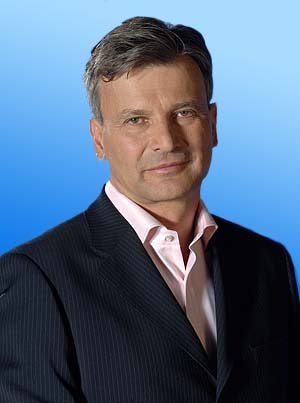

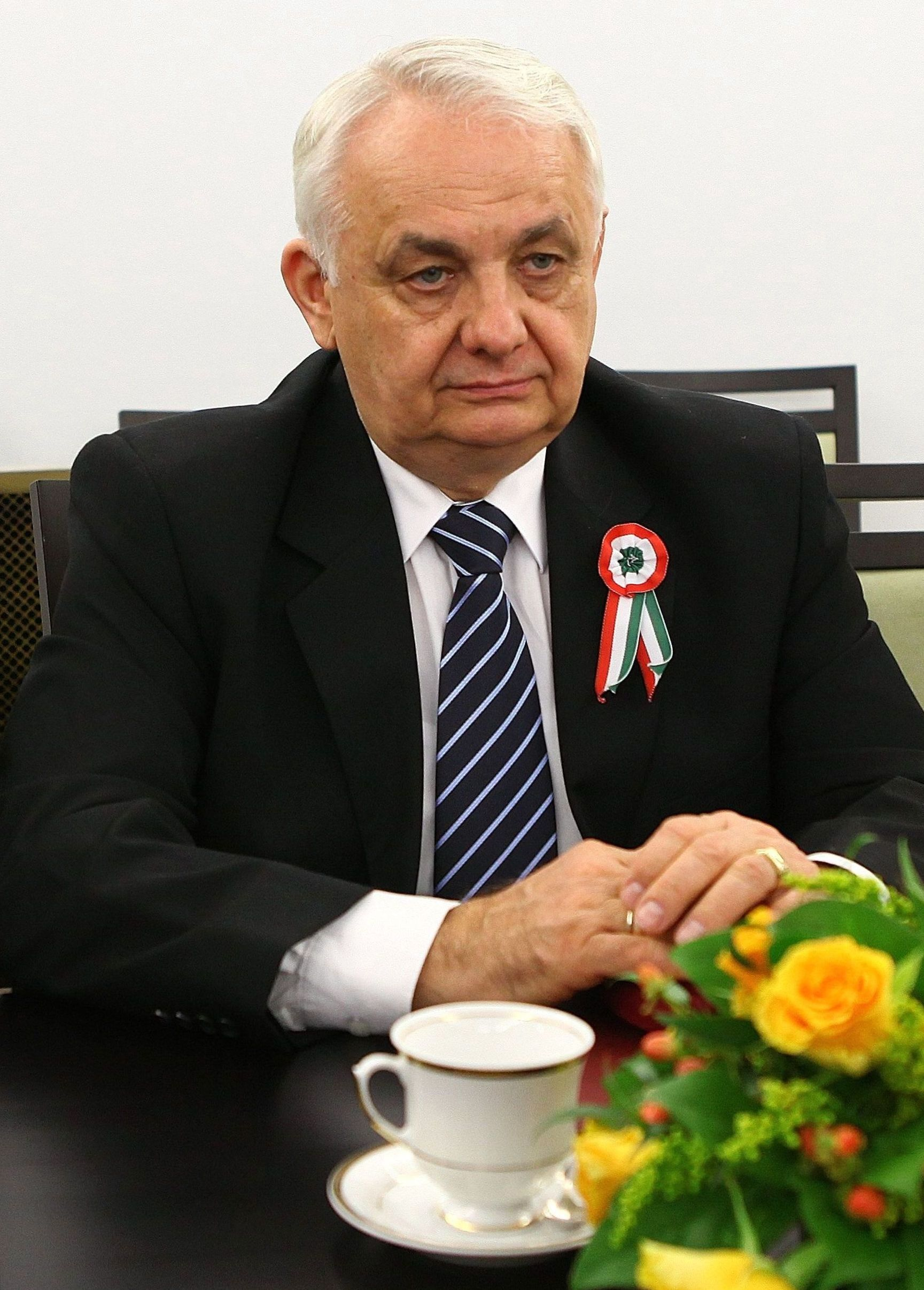

Candidate	Gábor Demszky	János Latorcai	Etele Baráth (hu)
Party	SZDSZ	KDNP	MSZP
Alliance		KDNP-MDF-Fidesz
Vote	215 374	168 731	155 365
Percentage	36.28%	28.43%	26.17%
Mayor before election
Gábor Demszky
SZDSZ
Elected Mayor
Gábor Demszky
SZDSZ

The 1994 Budapest mayoral election was held on 11 December 1994 and was the first direct election to elect the Mayor of Budapest (főpolgármester). On the same day, local elections were held throughout Hungary, including the districts of Budapest. The election was run using a First-past-the-post voting system. The winner of this election served for 4 years.

The election was won by the incumbent, Gábor Demszky.

== Results ==
1994 Budapest mayoral election
Party	Candidate	Votes	%	±%
SZDSZ	Gábor Demszky	215 374	36.28%	
KDNP	János Latorcai	168 731	28.43%	
MSZP	Etele Baráth	155 365	26.17%	
FKGP	János Szabó	33 651	5.67%	
Workers' Party	Pál Kollát	12 767	2.15%	
KP	György Magyar	7 706	1.30%	
Total votes		593 594	100.0%	
