= András Kupper =

Hungarian physician and politician

Member of the National Assembly
- In office 16 May 2006 – 5 May 2014

Faction leader of Fidesz in Budapest
- In office November 2003 – 1 October 2006
- Preceded by: Tamás Deutsch
- Succeeded by: István Tarlós

Personal details
- Born: 23 February 1964 (age 62) Budapest, Hungary
- Party: Fidesz
- Children: 2
- Profession: physician, politician

Dr. András Kupper (born 23 February 1964) is a Hungarian physician and politician, member of the National Assembly (MP) for Újbuda (Budapest Constituency XVII) between 2010 and 2014. He led Fidesz–MKDSZ faction in the General Assembly of Budapest between 2003 and 2006. He was also a Member of Parliament from the Fidesz Budapest Regional List between 2006 and 2010. He had been a member of the Committee on Health Affairs from 30 May 2006 to 5 May 2014.

Kupper served as Chancellor of the Franz Liszt Academy of Music between 2014 and 2015. He was dismissed by Prime Minister Viktor Orbán in April 2015, following his increasing number of conflicts with Andrea Vigh, the rector of the academy.

== Personal life ==
He is married and has two children.
