= Ákos Farkas =

Hungarian politician (1894–1955)

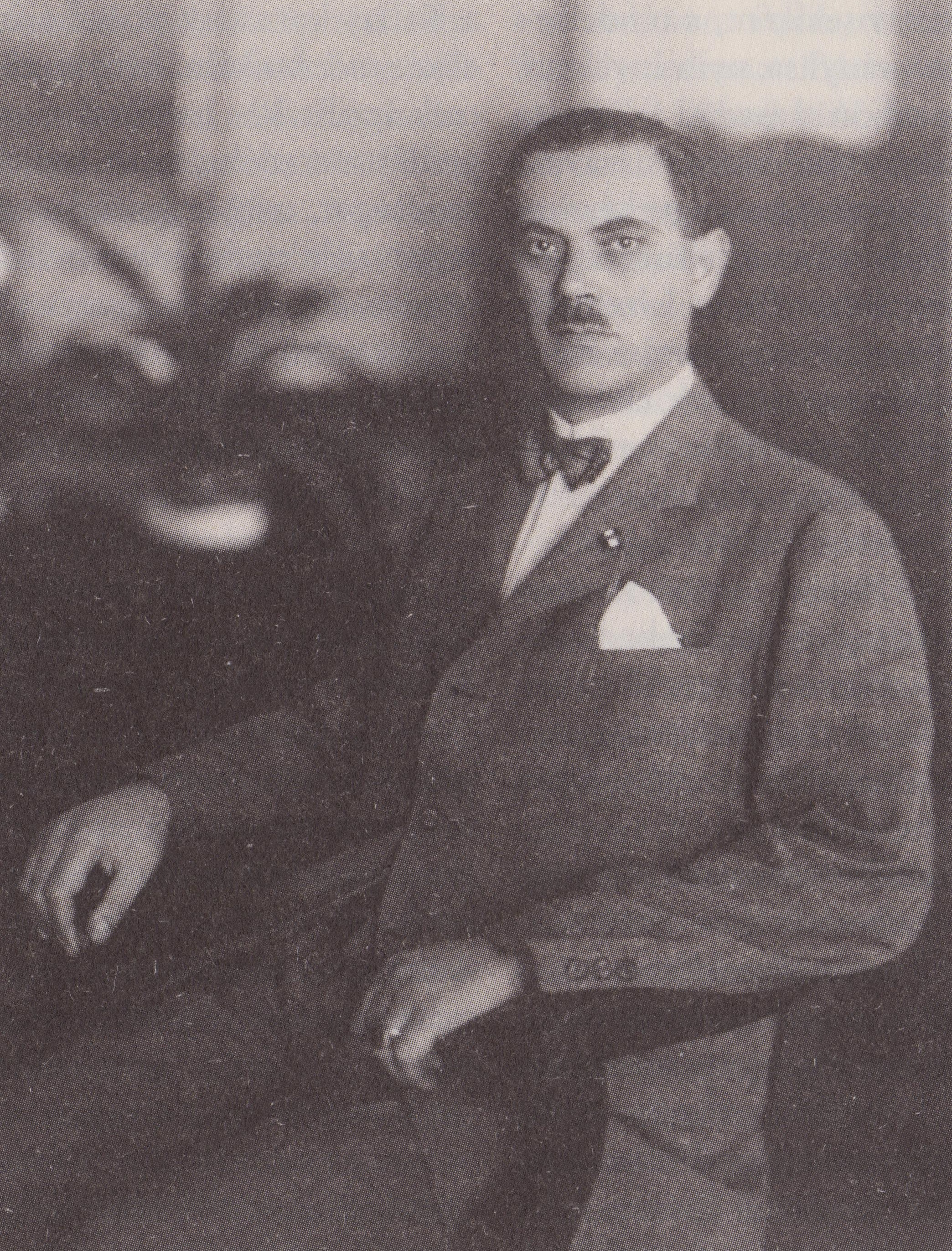

Mayor of Budapest
- In office 19 May 1944 – Late 1944
- Preceded by: Károly Szendy
- Succeeded by: János Csorba

Personal details
- Born: August 22, 1894 Tiszakürt, Austria-Hungary
- Died: 1955 Budapest, Hungary
- Party: Arrow Cross Party
- Profession: politician, jurist

Ákos Farkas de Dorog (22 August 1894 – 1955) was a Hungarian jurist and politician, who served as Mayor of Budapest during the Nazi occupation of Hungary. In his office he played a major role in the deportation of the Hungarian Jews, as a result after the Second World War he was sentenced to 10-year imprisonment by a People's Tribunal in Hungary.

== Life ==
Ákos Farkas finished his studies of law in the University of Budapest, after that, in 1913 he began to work at the capital's mayor office. During the First World War he was working at the Serbian General-Governmentship. After 1919, Farkas became secretary for mayor Jenő Sipőcz, where he served till 1933. In 1935 Farkas joined the "Association Against Noxious Vermin", the most prominent antisemitic propaganda organization.

After Operation Margarethe, the Hungarian mayor, Károly Szendy resigned as a protest against the occupation. He was succeeded by Ákos Farkas, who was elected as mayor on 19 May 1944. During his service, he played a major role in the application of the Sztójay government's act about the collection of the Jews of Budapest in ghettos. On 16 June 1944, Farkas issued a mayoral decree that marked out almost 2,000 apartment buildings in Budapest, "in which Jews (obliged under the existing decrees to wear the mark of the yellow star) may reside" [emphasis in the original].

After the Arrow Cross Party's coup d'état, he remained in his office, and played an active role in the deportation of the Jews of Budapest. When the Soviet troops arrived to Budapest, he left the city, and moved to Germany, where he was captured by the US Army. In 1946 he was transported to Hungary as a war criminal and sentenced to 10 years of imprisonment. He spent his punishment at Vác prison, where he died in illness, in 1955.

== Sources ==
Magyar Életrajzi Lexikon
