= Benedek Jávor =

Hungarian politician

Benedek Jávor MEP
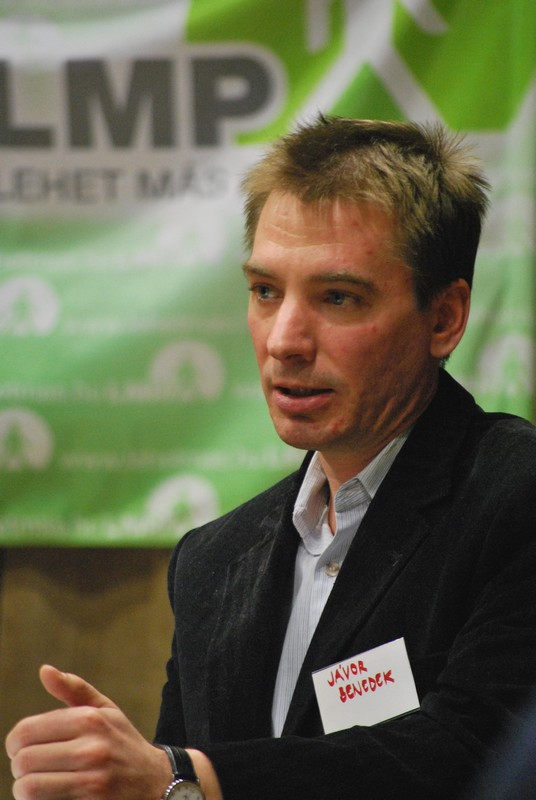

Member of the European Parliament
- In office 1 July 2014 – 1 July 2019
- Constituency: Hungary

Member of the National Assembly
- In office 14 May 2010 – 5 May 2014

Personal details
- Born: 2 July 1972 (age 54) Budapest, Hungary
- Party: Dialogue – The Greens' Party (2013–present)
- Other political affiliations: LMP (2009–2013)
- Children: 2
- Education: Eötvös Loránd University
- Website: www.javorbenedek.hu

Benedek Jávor (born 2 July 1972) is a Hungarian politician and a former Member of the European Parliament (MEP) from 2014 to 2019. He is a member of Dialogue for Hungary, part of the European Green Party.

== Biography ==
He finished his secondary studies at the Benedictine High School of Pannonhalma. He graduated in biology at the Faculty of Science of the Eötvös Loránd University in 1997 (MSc), and in 2006 he received his Ph.D. at the same university. He has been assistant professor at the department of environmental law at the Pázmány Péter Catholic University.

In 2000 he was a founding member of the environmental NGO Védegylet (Protect the Future!). He was an active organizer to support the election of László Sólyom as President of Hungary. In 2009 he was a founding member and one of the spokespersons of the Politics Can Be Different party. In the parliamentary election in 2010 he won a seat in the National Assembly. He served as Chairman of the Committee on Sustainable Development between 2010 and 2013. He was the LMP party's candidate for the position of Mayor of Budapest in the 2010 Budapest mayoral election. He received 9.89% of the vote and came to the third place. After the resignation of András Schiffer he was appointed leader of the LMP parliamentary group on 29 January 2012. During the party's congress in November 2012, the Politics Can Be Different decided not to join Together 2014, the electoral alliance of opposition parties and movements led by Gordon Bajnai. As a result Jávor, a follower of the agreement, resigned from his position of parliamentary group leader.

In January 2013, the LMP's congress rejected against the electoral cooperation with other opposition forces, including Together 2014. As a result members of LMP’s “Dialogue for Hungary” platform, under the leadership of Jávor, announced their decision to leave the opposition party and form a new organization. Benedek Jávor said the eight MPs leaving LMP would keep their parliamentary mandates. The leaving MPs established Dialogue for Hungary as a full-fledged party.

The Dialogue for Hungary (PM) held its inaugural congress on 17 February 2013. Jávor was elected co-president of the party, alongside Tímea Szabó. The congress also authorized the party's presidency to open the negotiations with Together 2014. On 8 March 2013, the PM entered into an alliance with the Together 2014, which officially formed as a political party. Jávor and Szabó, co-chairs of the PM also became members of the Together 2014's board.

Jávor was elected Member of the European Parliament (MEP) in the 2014 European Parliament election and joined The Greens–European Free Alliance (Greens/EFA). In June 2014, he was replaced as co-chair of the party by Gergely Karácsony. His name appeared in the joint list of the Hungarian Socialist Party (MSZP) and the Dialogue for Hungary during the 2019 European Parliament election, but did not win a mandate. In 2019, Jávor was the recipient of the Environment Award at The Parliament Magazine's annual MEP Awards.

He was appointed as head of the official representation of Budapest (led by mayor Gergely Karácsony, fellow Dialogue member) in Brussels on 1 January 2020. He was appointed board member of the Green European Foundation in October 2022.

== Personal life ==
He is married and has two children.

National Assembly of Hungary
Preceded by András Schiffer	Leader of the LMP parliamentary group 2012	Succeeded by András Schiffer
Party political offices
Preceded by New party	Co-President of Dialogue for Hungary alongside Tímea Szabó; 2013–2014	Succeeded by Tímea Szabó; Gergely Karácsony
