= Csaba Horváth (politician) =

Hungarian politician

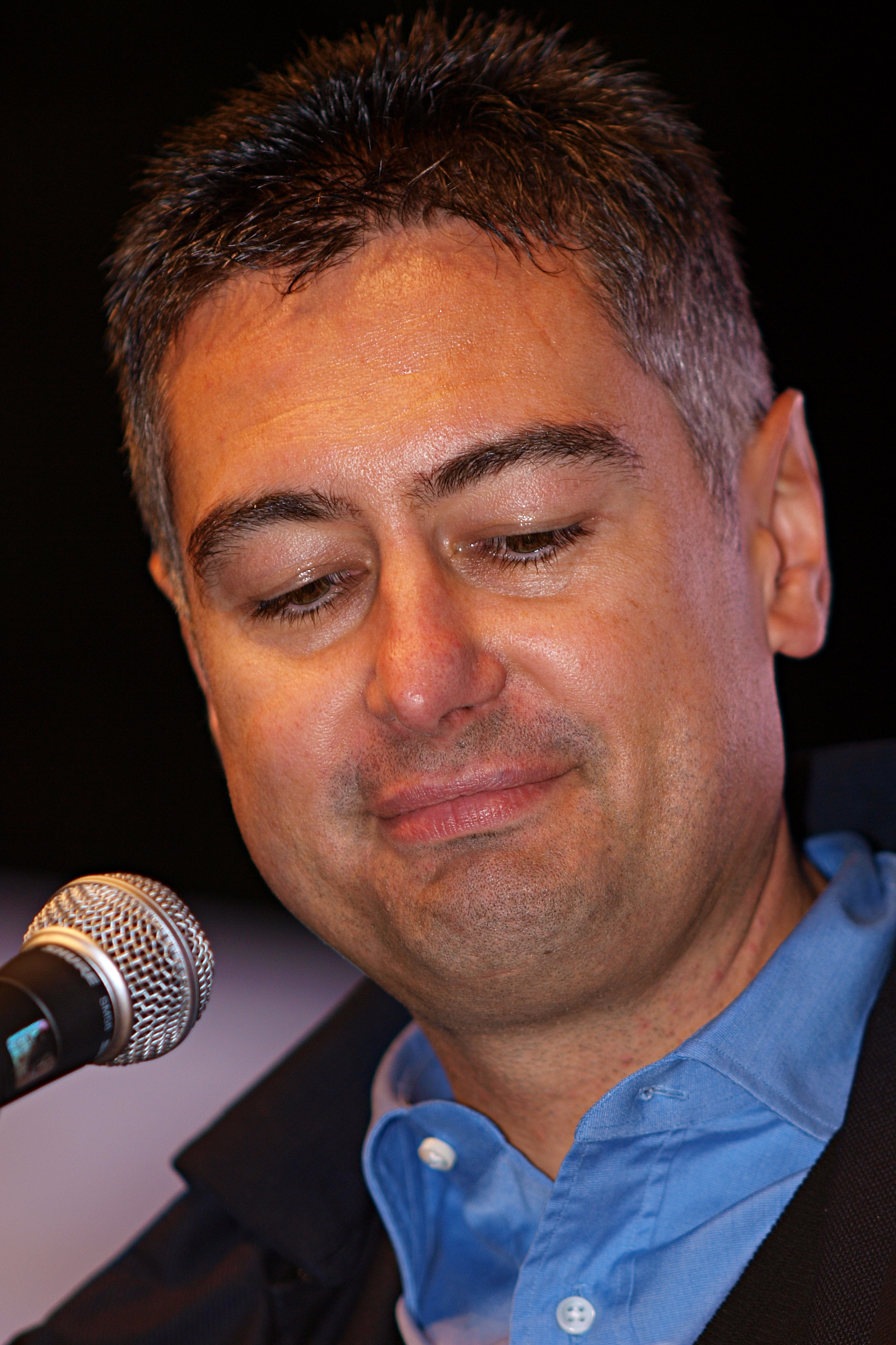
- Csaba Horváth in 2011

Mayor of Zugló
- In office 28 October 2019 – 1 October 2024
- Preceded by: Gergely Karácsony
- Succeeded by: András Rózsa

Deputy Mayor of Budapest for Human Affairs
- In office 15 February 2007 – 20 November 2009

Mayor of District II, Budapest
- In office 20 October 2002 – 1 October 2006
- Preceded by: György B. Bencze
- Succeeded by: Zsolt Láng

Member of the National Assembly
- In office 15 May 2002 – 7 October 2010

Personal details
- Born: November 19, 1969 (age 56) Budapest, Hungary
- Party: MSZP (since 1999)
- Children: 3
- Profession: salesperson

Csaba Horváth (born 19 November 1969) is a Hungarian politician.

== Biography ==
He served as the mayor of the 2nd district of Budapest from 2002 to 2006, and as Deputy Mayor of Budapest during the last term of Mayor Gábor Demszky, between 2007 and 2009. He was elected member of the National Assembly (MP) from the Budapest Regional List of the Hungarian Socialist Party (MSZP) in 2002, holding the position until his resignation in 2010. He was the MSZP's candidate for the position of Mayor of Budapest in the 2010 municipal election, but defeated by Fidesz-candidate István Tarlós. Thereafter he became leader of the Socialists' group in the General Assembly of Budapest.

Since 2019 he serves as the mayor of the Zugló.
