= Dialogue – The Greens' Party =

Hungarian political party

Dialogue – The Greens' Party Párbeszéd – A Zöldek Pártja
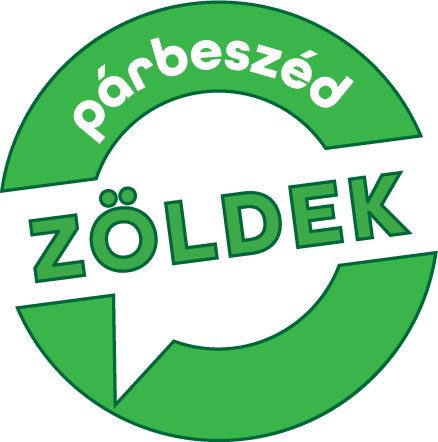
- Abbreviation: Párbeszéd – Zöldek; PM
- Leader: Rebeka Szabó; Tímea Szabó (managing)
- Founded: 17 February 2013
- Split from: LMP – Hungary's Green Party
- Ideology: Green politics; Social liberalism
- Political position: Centre-left to left-wing
- National affiliation: Unity (2014); United for Hungary (2020–2022); DK–MSZP–Dialogue (2024)
- European affiliation: European Green Party (associate member)
- Colours: Green
- National Assembly: 0 / 199
- European Parliament: 0 / 21
- County Assemblies: 0 / 381
- General Assembly of Budapest: 3 / 33

Party flag

Website
- parbeszed.hu

Dialogue – The Greens' Party (Hungarian: Párbeszéd – A Zöldek Pártja [ˈpaːrbɛseːd ɒː ˈzøldɛk ˈpaːrcɒ], prior to 2023 known as Dialogue for Hungary, Hungarian: Párbeszéd Magyarországért [ˈpaːrbɛseːd ˈmɒɟɒrorsaːɡeːrt]), in short Párbeszéd or Párbeszéd – Zöldek, is a green political party in Hungary that was formed in February 2013 by eight MPs who left the Politics Can Be Different (LMP) party. Since its foundation, the party has never independently participated in any election. In 2026, the party decided not to participate in the upcoming Hungarian parliamentary election.

== History ==
The Dialogue for Hungary party had formed a coalition with the Together 2014 party; together, they won four seats in the national assembly and one seat in the European Parliament. Dialogue for Hungary took one seat from the four in the Hungarian parliament and had one representative in Brussels.

On 24 August 2016, spokesperson Bence Tordai announced that the shortened form of the party's name would change to "Dialogue". In September 2016, the party's logo was changed to Párbeszéd (Dialogue), instead of "PM" by removing the word Hungary.

In the spring of 2018 the party formed an alliance with the Hungarian Socialist Party (MSZP). In the 2019 local elections the party's chairman Gergely Karácsony was elected as Mayor of Budapest.

In 2026, the party decided not to participate in 2026 Hungarian parliamentary election.

== Symbols ==
Party logo, 2013–2016

Party logo, 2016–2023

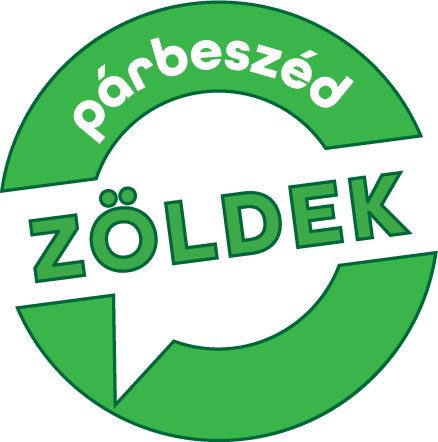
Party logo, since 2023

== Co-leaders ==
Term	Male co-chair	Female co-chair	Managing co-chair
2013–2014	Benedek Jávor	Tímea Szabó	Did not exist
2014–2022	Gergely Karácsony	Tímea Szabó	Did not exist
2022–2024	Bence Tordai	Rebeka Szabó	Did not exist
2024–	Richárd Barabás	Rebeka Szabó	Tímea Szabó

== Election results ==
=== National Assembly ===
Election	Leader	Constituency		Party list		Seats	+/–	Status
Election	Leader	Votes	%	Votes	%	Seats	+/–	Status
2014 (Note: Run within Unity coalition.)	Benedek Jávor; Tímea Szabó	1,317,879	26.85% (#2)	1,290,806	25.57% (#2)	1 / 199	New	Opposition
2018 (Note: Run in coalition with MSZP.)	Gergely Karácsony; Tímea Szabó	622,458	11.31% (#3)	682,701	11.91% (#3)	3 / 199	▲2	Opposition
2022 (Note: Run within United for Hungary coalition.)	Gergely Karácsony; Tímea Szabó	1,983,708	36.90% (#2)	1,947,331	34.44% (#2)	6 / 199	▲3	Opposition
2026	Did not contest							

=== European Parliament ===
Election	List leader	Votes	%	Seats	+/−	EP Group
2014 (Note: Run in a joint list with Together 2014.)	Benedek Jávor	168,076	7.25 (#5)	1 / 21	New	Greens/EFA
2019 (Note: Run in a joint list with MSZP.)	Bertalan Tóth	229,551	6.61 (#4)	0 / 21	▼1	−
2024 (Note: Run as part of the DK–MSZP–Dialogue coalition.)	Klára Dobrev	367,162	8.03 (#3)	0 / 21	0	−

== See also ==
- List of political parties in Hungary
