= István Tarlós =

Hungarian politician

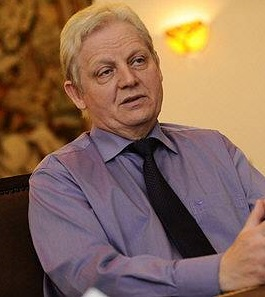
- Tarlós in 2014

Mayor of Budapest
- In office 3 October 2010 – 13 October 2019
- Preceded by: Gábor Demszky
- Succeeded by: Gergely Karácsony

Faction leader of Fidesz in Budapest
- In office 1 October 2006 – 3 October 2010
- Preceded by: András Kupper
- Succeeded by: Zoltán Németh

Mayor of Óbuda-Békásmegyer
- In office 30 September 1990 – 1 October 2006
- Preceded by: Imre Kiss (as Chairman of the Council)
- Succeeded by: Balázs Bús

Personal details
- Born: 26 May 1948 (age 78) Budapest, Hungary
- Party: Independent (since 1994)
- Other political affiliations: Fidesz–KDNP (2006–); Alliance of Free Democrats (1989–1994)
- Spouse: Cecília Nagy (m. 1973)
- Children: 2 daughters, 1 son
- Education: Budapest University of Technology and Economics (M.Sc)
- Profession: politician, engineer
- Website: Personal website

István Tarlós (Note: Hungarian pronunciation: [ˈiʃtvaːn ˈtɒrloːʃ]) (born 26 May 1948) is a Hungarian politician who served as the mayor of Óbuda-Békásmegyer from 1990 to 2006 and as mayor of Budapest from 2010 to 2019. Between 2006 and 2010, Tarlós was the chairman of the Fidesz–Christian Democratic People's Party (KDNP) Fraction-Alliance in the General Assembly of the Municipality of Budapest and served as the political leader of the 2008 Social Referendum.

== Early life ==
Tarlós was born in Budapest on 26 May 1948. Both his father, Dr. István Tarlós Sr., a lawyer, and his mother, Hilda Dienes, a chief accountant, worked for the Hungarian Academy of Sciences. Tarlós has described his family as civic-minded and religious.

After his graduation from Árpád High School's Humanities Department, Tarlós worked as an unskilled laborer before he was conscripted into the military in Orosháza. After his military service, Tarlós attended the Budapest University of Technology and Economics, receiving his degree in civil engineering. He went on to complete a graduate program in Finance and Organization from Ybl Miklós Technical College.

Tarlós worked for 15 years in the building industry, mostly in investing and contractor tasks. During his civil engineer career, Tarlós held numerous positions, including foreman, deputy construction leader, construction leader, technical controller, and head of production department.

Tarlós married Cecília Nagy, a civil engineer, in 1973. They have three children and six grandchildren. In the early 1990s, Tarlós launched his own architect studio with his wife.

== Political career ==
=== Mayor of Óbuda-Békásmegyer ===
Tarlós first entered politics by becoming a member of the anti-communist Alliance of Free Democrats (SZDSZ) in 1989. He then became Budapest District III (Óbuda-Békásmegyer) Mayor in 1990 with the support of the SZDSZ and Fidesz.

Campaign flag of Tarlós for the 2006 mayoral election

Tarlós left SZDSZ in the summer of 1994 because of ideological and moral differences. He claims he could not accept the radical change in directions and principles of the party within the short period of its existence. He has been an independent politician since then. As an independent, he was reelected as Major of Budapest District III with large majorities in 1994, 1998 and 2002.

During his political career, Tarlós was able to establish a functioning coalition between the liberal and socialist fractions within the municipality of his district. The General Assembly regularly passed Tarlós's budget plans and budget reports without abstention or blackball. However, the remains of the first conservative party of the Prime Minister József Antall and the Hungarian Democratic Forum (MDF) considered Tarlós's Budapest mayoral candidacy controversial; which resulted in numerous secessions of party members and leaders as well as demonstrations on the streets of District III and within the town walls.

In 2007, Tarlós entered the local election in 2006 as mayoral candidate of Budapest, and lost by a mere 1 percent against incumbent mayor Gábor Demszky (SZDSZ).

While still identifying as independent but declared conservative politician, Tarlósl ed the Fidesz-KDNP fraction in the General Assembly of Budapest from October 2006 until October 2010. Along with his role as fraction-leader, Tarlós led the "Social Referendum 2008" campaign, initiated by Fidesz and Civil Social Basis.

=== Mayor of Budapest ===
==== First term ====
In 2010 he was elected with the program of bringing the local government-owned companies under direct local government control and under full oversight of the assembly. He pledged to divert more funds to material and salary expenditures of services (police, firefighters, schools, public transport) the state of which he described as neglected. Instead of always choosing between individual developments while the stability of the city is according to him always pressed to the limit, he wants to drive the macroeconomic curves of the city into a long-term self-sustaining. The Prime Minister guaranteed the city will be provided with the funds necessary for finishing ongoing infrastructure investments.

Until 2013 the mayor's administration completely overhauled the structure of the companies owned by the local government. In the new structure the companies operate more efficiently, which resulted in significant reduction of operating costs. This money can be redirected to development.

In 2013 Viktor Orbán's government started a program to lift Hungary's local governments out of debt. 100% of the debts of settlements whose population is under 5000 was repaid by the government. 60% of the debt of Budapest was repaid by the government. Later the remaining 40% was also repaid by the government, after the government decided to eliminate all debts of all local governments. In this year the national government accepted the request of the local government to finance the BKISZ project from EU funds. This project builds the sewerage system in all parts of the city that did not have this infrastructure yet. Construction works will finish in Summer of 2015. The capacity of the city's wastewater treatment plants by 2009 had already been increased to be able to treat all generated wastewater.

In 2013 István Tarlós's administration drafted the city's next development plan, that applies to the 2014-2030 time period. 27 large projects were initiated to be realised from EU funds until 2020. Among them was the complete reconstruction and extension of Metro Line 3, the extension of several tramlines and the purchase of new trams and buses.

From 1 January 2014 the price of most public transport passes for natural persons was decreased by 10%. This was made possible by the reorganized control activity which reduced illegal travel, increased the number of passes sold and the amount of money flowing in from pass sales. This was the first time since the fall of communism that pass prices became cheaper.

On 28 March 2014, the fourth metro line, which was constructed for eight years, was opened to the public. During Tarlós's term the capital renegotiated the contracts, by which act it was able to regain tens of billions of forints of the total cost of more than 400 billion forints.

In spring of 2014 a program was initiated to install 300 ticket and pass automats citywide. These automats allow payment both via cash or credit card. The automats operate 24 hours a day, thus provide more flexibility to customers. The automats also made queues at ticket and pass offices shorter.

The municipal government operates approximately 1300 buses daily. By September 2014 500 modern low-floor buses were bought, of which 300 were newly manufactured. This made it possible to scrap 500 of the oldest buses that were both in a bad state and polluted the environment too much. The municipal government plans to serve the public from 2018 only by modern low-floor buses.

In September 2014 introduction of the FUTÁR information system was completed. It allows the traffic control center to continuously monitor all public transport buses and carriages of the city by having installed GPS in each of them, and it makes communication possible with the drivers concerned, e.g. with all drivers of a specific line, or of all lines affected by an accident on their common route. FUTÁR also provides information to passengers: 263 digital boards were installed to high-traffic bus and tram stops. These boards show the approximate time that remains until the next buses and carriages of the different lines arrive to the stop. The central computer system calculates the time remaining until the buses and carriages reach the stops. The boards also inform passengers about temporary route modifications and other special circumstances. The information provided by the boards can also be accessed via internet, a smartphone application is also available to do this. In September 2014 the MOL Bubi bicycle hire system was opened for public use. It consists of 76 stations in the inner part of the city, which serve 1100 bicycles.

The city was scheduled to receive 47 completely low-floor CAF trams in 2015 and 2016 according to a contract signed on 2014 March 5. As prescribed by another contract signed on 8 October 2014, by 2017 a modern electronic ticket and pass system will replace the current and outdated paper-based system. The system is going to be introduced in multiple phases.

==== Second term ====
Tarlós was re-elected mayor for a second term (which this time was five years long) in the 2014 election. He received 49.06% of the votes.

The reconstruction of tramlines 1 and 3 was finished in this term. These lines run along two beltways at the border of the inner part of the city. The reconstruction eliminated the speed limits that had to be introduced because of poor condition of the tracks. In this term the Interweaving Tramlines Project of Buda (Budai Fonódó Villamos Project) was also completed. This project unified the tramlines of the Buda (western) side of the Capital, creating lines that enable travelling from the northern areas of the city to the southern areas, without the need to transfer from one line to another.

On 11 November 2014 a contract was signed according to which 200 new low-floor buses entered service in 2015. This increased the ratio of low-floor buses in the bus fleet of the city from 55% to 70%. The municipal government announced in June 2017 that the ratio of low-floor buses reaches 95-99% by September 2017.

The first train of Metro Line 3 was handed over in January 2016 to the Russian Metrowagonmash (the original manufacturer) to be reconstructed. Tarlós had preferred buying new trains, but he had been overwritten by the Orbán government. The prototype of the reconstructed trains entered service on 20 March 2017. Since then, the number of reconstructed trains serving the line is scheduled to increase by 2 trains every month.

On 4 September 2017 the contracts for reconstructing the whole tunnel of Metro Line 3 and the stations of the northern section were signed, thus the reconstruction effectively started. The stations will be finished by 31 December 2018. After this phase, the stations of the middle and southern sections will be reconstructed, the order of these two phases is not yet decided. Overhauling the tunnel is set to end by 24 August 2020.

In June 2015, Budapest decided to bid for the 2024 Summer Olympics. Tarlós emphasized the necessary city development projects and the expected boom in tourism. However, in January 2017 a civil organization called Momentum Movement started a petition to have a referendum for Budapest residents whether they want to organize it or not. The Movement campaigned for redirecting the funds from a high-risk investment to immediately support health care and education. On 17 February 2017, it was announced that 266,151 signatures had been collected, to which Tarlós reacted by negotiating with PM Viktor Orbán and the Hungarian Olympic Committee, then agreeing to and withdrawing the bid to host the 2024 Summer Olympics, leaving only Los Angeles and Paris in the race. Tarlós blamed the opposition parties they were "backing out" from their earlier position of supporting the bid, and called this attitude as "treachery".

On 5 February 2018, nine opposition parties started collecting signatures to hold a referendum to ensure all 20 stations of Metro Line 3 are made fully accessible during the line's reconstruction. Until that point, the local government only planned to guarantee this at 12 stations, but on 7 February the mayor's office negotiated with the national umbrella organization for disabled people, then announced it would build inclined elevators next to the existing escalators at 6 more stations. Both the opposition parties and the umbrella organization operating independently from them announced they regard acceptable only full compliance with accessibility standards at all stations. On 21 February, initiator of the referendum Csaba Horváth (socialist floor leader of the Municipal Assembly) cancelled the signature collecting, referring to the Mayor's former announcement and to the calculations regarding the cost of the referendum can cover the cost of building elevators at the two remaining stations.

On 10 October 2018, István Tarlós announced that he would run for a third term as Mayor of Budapest, after negotiating about his future role with Prime Minister Viktor Orbán. According to the press, the two politicians concluded a 15-point agreement, which contained altogether HUF 1,000 billion development package. The Metropolitan Public Development Council was established with members delegated by both the government and the General Assembly of Budapest. Tarlós and Orbán also accepted a 10-year "Budapest 2030" urban development plan. The government guaranteed the functions of garbage disposal and sewerage remained the responsibility of the local municipality. In June 2019, in the opposition's first primary election, Gergely Karácsony was elected as the united opposition's joint candidate to the position of mayor. In the October 2019 local election, Tarlós, receiving 44.10% of the vote, was defeated by Karácsony, while the opposition parties also gained majority in the General Assembly of Budapest. After his defeat, Tarlós announced his retirement from politics and did not take over his gained seat in the General Assembly.

=== Later career ===
Weeks after his defeat during the 2019 local elections, István Tarlós was appointed Prime Ministerial Commissioner for the Development of National Transportation and Public Service Infrastructure on 31 October 2019. Officially, he took the position the following day.

== Social work ==
Through the assignment of numerous district mayors, Tarlós became vice-chairman of the Council of Regional Development between 1999 and 2003. He visited the Institutions of the EU in Brussels on diverse occasions. During this period Tarlós lead the Commission for Strategic Planning of the Central-Hungarian Region and co-founded the Hungarian Society of Law-Enforcement-Science, the Baross Gábor Society and became a member of the Széchenyi Society. Additionally Tarlós was given the task of the honorary chairman of the Disaster-Recovery and Civil Protection Council as well as of the Braunhaxler Association of Budapest District III. He is also a member of the board of the Christian Intellectual Alliance.

== Awards, prizes ==
- Minor Cross of Order of Merit of the Republic of Hungary
- Officer's Cross of the Order of Merit of the Republic of Poland (2008)
- Golden Degree of Szent Gellért Award
- Eötvös József Golden Medal
- Henszlmann Imre Award
- Remembrance Medal for Hungarian Urbanism
- Grand Cross of Allegiance for Fatherland
- Medal for Civil Organisations
- Golden Seal-Ring Award of Mayors
- Silver Medal of the Municipality of Székelyudvarhely
- Palatinus Medal of the Municipality of Révkomárom
- Honored Citizen, Budapest District III (from 2007)

== Book ==
- Tarlós by Károly Boros (Magyar Ház Kiadó, Budapest, 2007)

Political offices
Preceded by Imre Kiss	Mayor of Óbuda-Békásmegyer; 1990–2006	Succeeded by Balázs Bús
Preceded by Gábor Demszky	Mayor of Budapest; 2010–2019	Succeeded by Gergely Karácsony
