= Gábor Demszky =

Hungarian politician

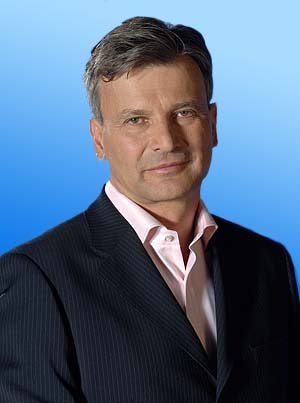

Mayor of Budapest
- In office 31 October 1990 – 3 October 2010
- Preceded by: József Bielek as Chairman of the Council
- Succeeded by: István Tarlós

Personal details
- Born: 4 August 1952 (age 74) Budapest, Hungary
- Party: SZDSZ
- Spouse(s): Martinné K. Róza Hodosán; Vera Révai; Anikó Németh; Noémi Kapitány
- Children: Alma-Mira; Dániel; Dorottya; András
- Profession: politician, lawyer, sociologist

Gábor Demszky (Note: Hungarian pronunciation: [ˈɡaːbor ˈdɛmski]) (born 4 August 1952) is a Hungarian politician, lawyer and sociologist by qualification. Demszky was the Mayor of Budapest from 1990 to 2010. He was a founding member of the Alliance of Free Democrats (SZDSZ) between 1988 and 2010.

== Biography ==
As a teenager, Demszky joined an informal Maoist radical group, which criticized the socialist Kádár's government from an ultra-hardliner communist viewpoint. After two years, he lost faith in political left ideas and took interest in libertarian ideology. He earned a degree in sociology from Eötvös Loránd University. During the late period of communist regime, Demszky was a leading figure of the then illegal underground democratic opposition to the Kádár-system. His main anti-government activities included the organizing of printing and publishing of illegal books, periodicals, and newspapers collectively called 'samizdats'. During this time he was surveyed by the secret services, harassed by authorities and he clashed multiple times with the state police during demonstrations for free press and multi-party democracy.

In the last years of the regime, he was a founding member of the SZDSZ party, which he led briefly during the late 1990s, before he resigned the post of party premier in protest over factionary in-fighting. He did not ask for his membership's renewal in 2010, therefore ceased to be a member. Since he left his office, he is in a set of former mayors who, despite being younger than the retirement age, are eligible for state-pensions, according to the law on local governments. He declared he doesn't plan full-time activity in the future.

== Office ==
Demszky was first elected as Mayor of Budapest in 1990, and has won all the elections in which he run for that position since then (1994, 1998, 2002, 2006). He is with one of the longest serving time among politicians holding the same offices since the fall of communism. During his first term, the primary goal of his mayorship was working against the collapse of public services and order and working against increasing homelessness and unemployment, while dealing with the soviet-era legacy: the environmental damages and the ruined down working infrastructure that had been suffering from underinvestment and lacked satisfactory repairs for at least one decade. Cityscape quality was also ruined because of the pragmatic modernizations of a shortage-economy.

In the first five years they managed to bring unemployment and homelessness down by inviting private investors and building relationships with employee-trainers, but the economy of the city mainly depended on government policy. During the first two terms reconstruction of the Millennium Underground to its Dualism-Era quality was done, as well as building the new Lágymányosi Bridge, and the Hungary Boulevard (the boulevard that is currently the furthest from the city center), while the national government built the southern sector of M0, albeit temporarily on a decreased capacity.

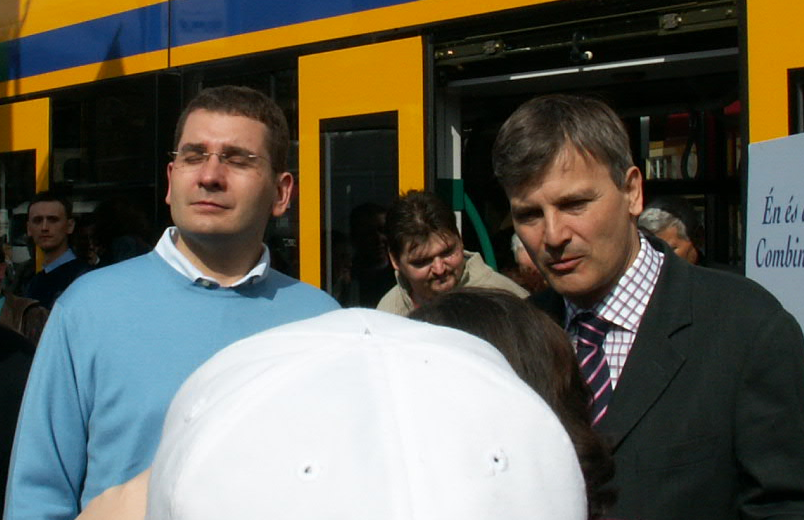
János Kóka and Gábor Demszky at the presentation of the first Siemens Combino tram in 2006

A government denial of transferring of even compulsory funds to compulsory services of the city in the 1998–2002 term led to a stop in infrastructure investment and, in spite of the metropolitan government's own funds were diverted to repair-politics, statistical degradation of the pipe system and all materials (schools, buses, trams, heat plants) in metropolitan ownership took place for four years. Only the cultural life of the city was boosted from government funds constructing the House of Terror, the National Theatre, in Park Millenáris the House of Future and the Palace of Miracles, etc. After what all notable political analysts described as the government fell in trying to make Demszky fall (no Fidesz MEP-nominee could win in, e.g., any electorate district of all districts affected by cancellation of metro line 4, the number of people voting there impacted the rate-defined parliamentary seats dramatically), a faster development started with comprehensive repairs.

From 2004, BKV started a modernization, by 2010 50% of the city's main roads were reconstructed, only the northwestern sector of M0 was missing, the tunnel of metro line 4 was started and metró line 2 was reconstructed, 1 more bridge (Megyeri Bridge) was built and 3 others were completely reconstructed and renovated (Liberty Bridge, Margaret Bridge and North Rail Bridge). Sewage treatment increased from 20% of generated sewage in 1990 to 98% in 2010, pipe-coverage also increased to near 100%. The lighting and traffic-light systems were reconstructed with energy-efficient and non-skypolluting lamps, and the central heating and electric power systems were also reconstructed. In the two last terms the problems to be worked against and finally decreased were rapid increase in modern cars and traffic, and intrusive effects of nightlife. The attention of the local government gradually turned to urban renewal as infrastructure-modernization programs finished and funds spent on them freed up.

== Criticism ==
His party initiated the dissolution of the central local government to district governments which had significant powers like deciding the layouts of areas on the micro-level, or deciding on allowing demolition of large areas after selling them to private investors, which in return built and paved roads and built and replaced pipes in outer districts. He after getting elected as mayor worked for recentralising the city, but could never get the parliament modify the law created during the moment of the second world melting forever.

He became a vocal critic of the districts because they achieved accelerated improvement at the cost of intrusion to the structure of the city, especially to its contiguous areas with potential in tourism or historical reconstruction, and he also became a vocal critic of the passages of the local government law applying to the capital. The districts in turn complained of negligence from the metropolitan government's part and of unfair dealings and distribution of funds and cooperation which outer districts and even professionals of the metropolitan government described as solving problems beginning from the center. His administration was also criticized for not stepping into direct oversight of the financial activities of its companies. This was achieved in cooperation with government agencies (National Bureau of Investigation, Police) during the last government's country-level program of transparency.

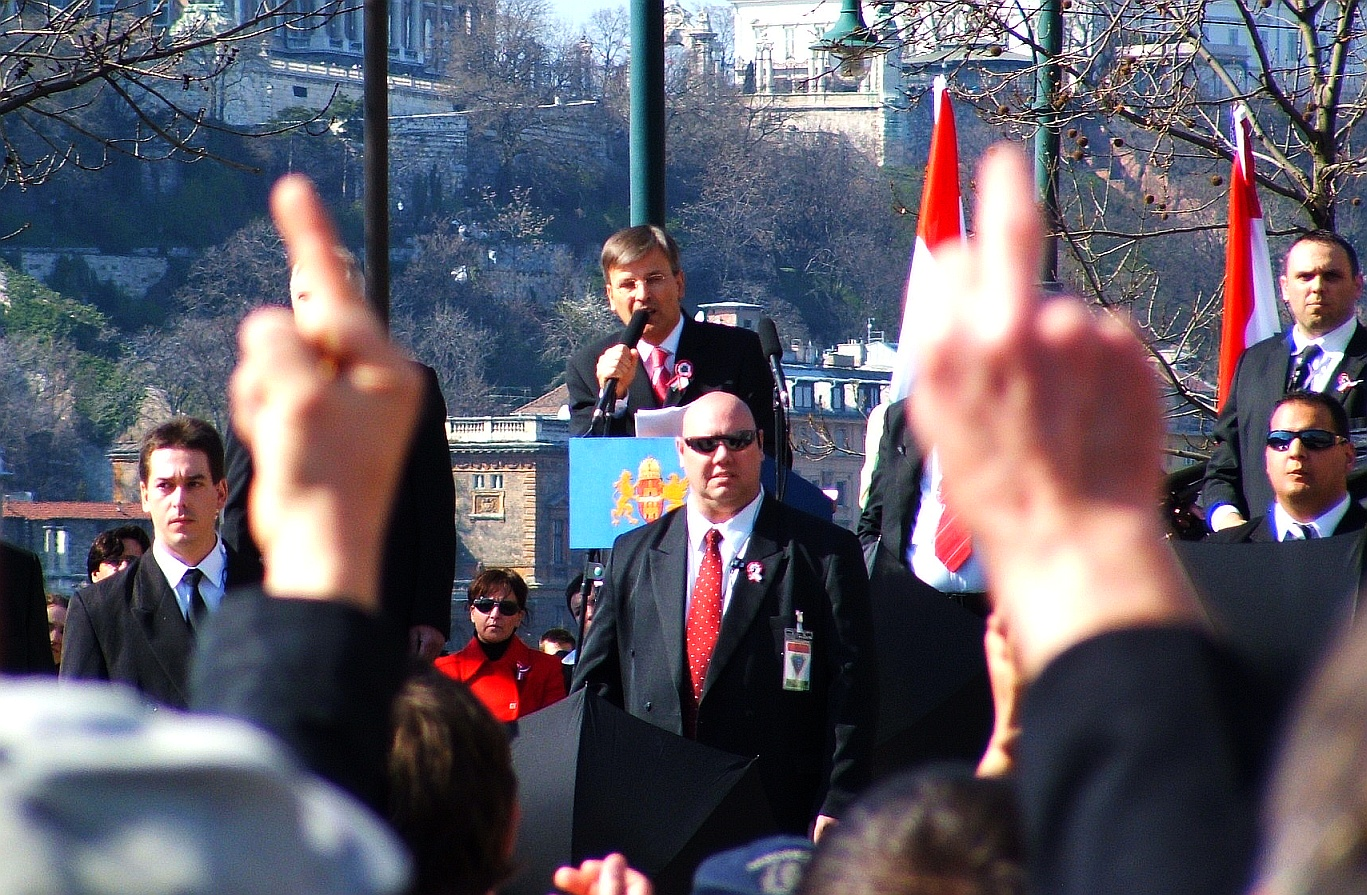
Demonstration against Gábor Demszky during his speech (15 March 2007)

In 2006, after the Ferenc Gyurcsány's audiotape-created political crisis broke out, Demszky's actions to seek ways to limit or otherwise restrict demonstrations critical of the government were criticised by his party's opposition and as well as by civil rights groups. He ordered the posting of 100–150 signs forbidding agricultural vehicles to use Budapest's main roads and enter the city center, to prevent an agricultural association staging a protest against the government and also he initiated a regulation, that mandates a permission to be obtained from the mayor's office to set up a stage for the purpose of a political event and also mandates a permission to be obtained for placing vehicles on public property for non-parking reasons. The regulation has been passed in the city council by the government majority, but it has been widely criticised for contradicting the constitution and the law which regulates public assembly (this is a so-called qualified majority law, i.e. in order to modify that law, a 2/3 majority has to be obtained in the national assembly).

In an interview, Demszky stated that the reason for forbidding the tractors was that they would have eroded the freshly reconstructed roads (200 km roads were reconstructed in the year 2006 only) and would have completely disrupted the full traffic of Budapest and since that they would have expressed only a few hundred people's opinion, it was unacceptable. Nevertheless, he thought that the protest had no real basis, as all fund transfers were done that year, the tractors were funded by the government 40–45%, and the leaders of the agricultural association happening to organise were members of that Fidesz faction which agitated to radicals in front of parliament, and refused to be present in the assembly during the Prime Minister's speeches, the only difference was that these members have drawn into battle their supporters' tractors also. However, he stated he never denied the right of protesting and only protected the reconstructed roads from vehicles not supposed to function there.

He was criticized for the worn state of Metro Line 3, which his successor, István Tarlós inherited. During Tarlós' first term trains started burning or smoking multiple times, but this caused neither fatality nor serious injury. Tarlós reacted by scrapping all carriages older than 40 years and by starting the work leading to reconstruction of the line.

Demszky had mobilized and tied down half of the budgets of his last term to investments in infrastructure (like building Metro Line 4 and the Central Wastewater Treatment Plant, which now treats 50% of the capital's sewage), for which he had also secured national and EU funds supplementing the invested amount of the capital multiple times. Thus he could not afford to reconstruct Metro Line 3, but financing the reconstruction's planning would have cost only a few hundred millions of Forints in the approximately 500-billion-Forint yearly budgets, and it would have allowed the reconstruction to start years earlier.

== Honours and awards ==
- Albania: On 29 February 2008 received a copy of the key of the city of Tirana on the occasion of his state visit to Albania.

== See also ==
- Timeline of Budapest

== Notes ==
1. Mayoral Election results Hungary, 1990–2006 (in Hungarian), on the VoksCentrum website of the Institute of Political History, retrieved October 2, 2006. To retrieve Budapest mayoral election results choose "Budapest" in the search box marked Megyék szerint: or "Budapest főpolgármester" in the search box marked ABC sorrendben:. See also Preliminary results Budapest Mayor and city council, 2006 (in Hungarian), Magyar Hirlap, October 1, 2006, retrieved October 2, 2006.

Political offices
Preceded by József Bielek	Mayor of Budapest; 1990–2010	Succeeded by István Tarlós
Party political offices
Preceded by Bálint Magyar	President of the Alliance of Free Democrats; 2000–2001	Succeeded by Gábor Kuncze
