= Dávid Vitézy =

Hungarian economist and politician

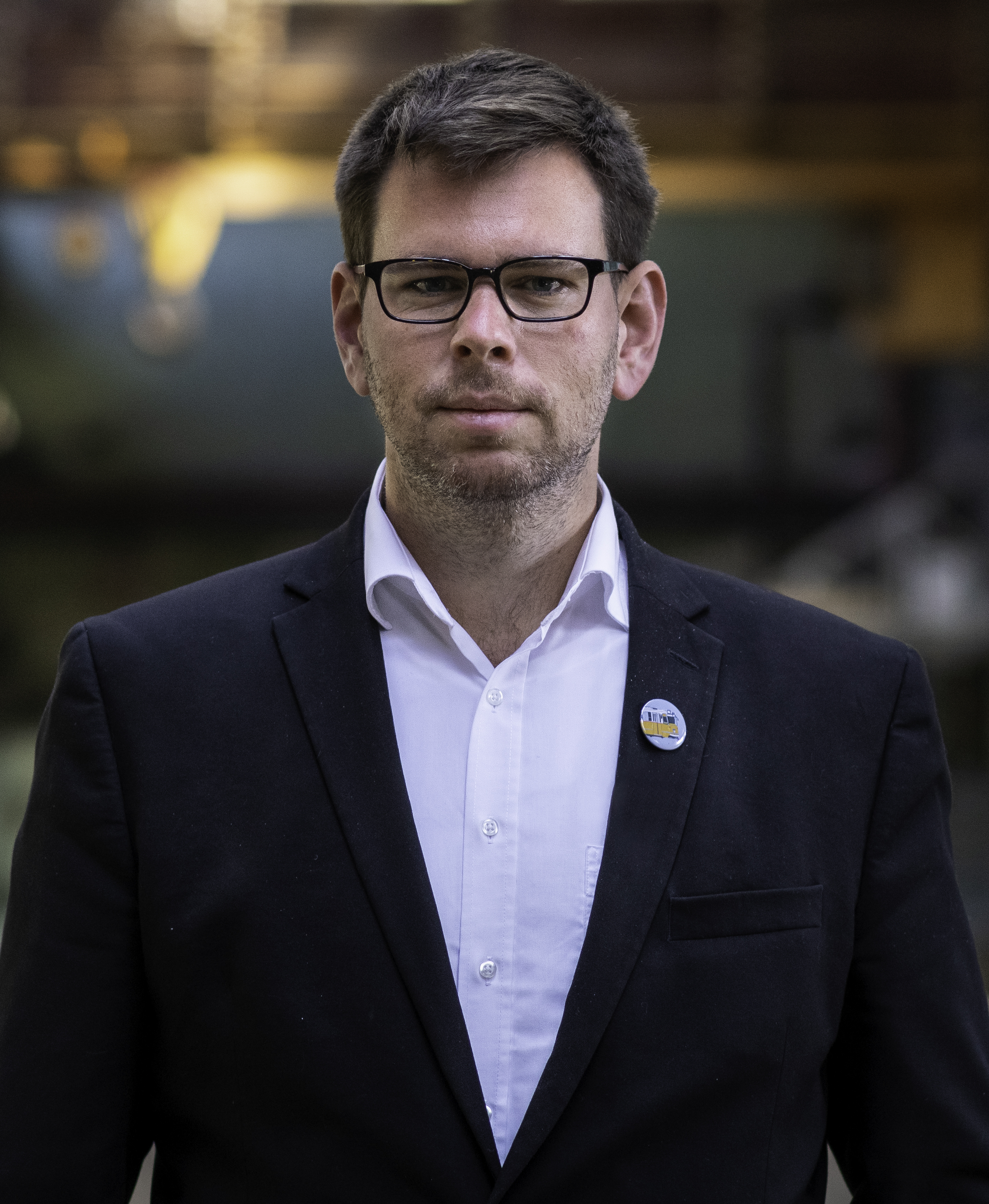
- Vitézy in 2021

Minister of Transport and Investment
- Incumbent
- Assumed office 13 May 2026
- Prime Minister: Péter Magyar
- Preceded by: János Lázár

Secretary of State for Transport
- In office 25 May 2022 – 21 November 2022
- Prime Minister: Viktor Orbán
- Minister: László Palkovics
- Preceded by: László Mosóczi
- Succeeded by: Bálint Nagy

Personal details
- Born: Dávid László Vitézy; 1 December 1985 (age 40) Budapest, Hungary
- Party: Independent (affiliated with TISZA)
- Relations: László Vitézy (father); Ágnes Hankiss (mother)
- Education: Budapest University of Technology and Economics
- Profession: Economist, traffic expert

Dávid László Vitézy (born 1 December 1985) is a Hungarian transport expert, economist, and politician who has served as the Minister of Transport and Investment since May 2026. He previously served as Secretary of State for Transport from May to November 2022. He was a candidate for Mayor of Budapest in the 2024 Budapest mayoral election.

He was a prominent member of the NGO Urban and Suburban Transport Association (VEKE) from 2000 to 2010. He was inaugural CEO of Centre for Budapest Transport (BKK) between 2010 and 2014. He was ministerial commissioner overseeing the development of public transport, especially the coordination of regional and long-distance relations within the Ministry of National Development for some months in 2015. He served as director of the Hungarian Technical and Transport Museum from 2016 to 2022. Simultaneously, he was CEO of Budapest Development Center (BFK) from 2020 to 2022. Following the victory of the Tisza Party in the 2026 elections, incoming Prime Minister Péter Magyar announced that Vitézy will be serving as Minister of Transport and Investment.

== Family and studies ==
Vitézy was born into a family of Jewish origin in Budapest on 1 December 1985, as the son of film director László Vitézy (1940–2024) and his third wife, social psychologist and MEP Ágnes Hankiss (née Erdős; 1950–2021). His maternal grandfather was Péter Erdős (1925–1990), the controller of pop music life during the late Kádár era, and maternal grandmother was Erzsébet Köves (1927–1989), literary historian and secretary of 1956 martyr Géza Losonczy. The first husband of his mother was sociologist Elemér Hankiss (1928–2015). His paternal uncles are entrepreneurs András Vitézy and Tamás Vitézy. The latter's daughter is Rita (Dávid's cousin), spouse of actor and theater director Rodrigo Crespo (born 1973). One of Dávid's half-siblings is Zsófia Vitézy, the Hungarian Ambassador to Colombia since 2022. She is maternal cousin of Viktor Orbán, the longest serving Prime Minister of Hungary. That is why, contrary to some assumptions, Dávid Vitézy is not related by blood to Orbán.

Dávid Vitézy is a confirmed bachelor who has never got married, but owns cats as pets.

Vitézy graduated from Lauder Javne Jewish Community School in 2004. He graduated in economics from the Faculty of Economics of the Budapest University of Technology and Economics (BME), majoring in regional settlement and territorial development, in 2010.

== Professional career ==
=== Early career ===
At the age of 15 in 2000, Vitézy was a founding member of the Urban and Suburban Transport Association (VEKE), an NGO with the aim of improving public transport in Hungarian cities and representing the interests of passengers. He was a board member of the organization from 2002, then head of the association's transport development working group until 2010. Beside that, he functioned as spokesperson of the VEKE from 2006 to 2010. He had a prominent role in the fact that the night transport of Budapest was completely transformed and significantly expanded in 2005 with the introduction of the 900 number series night bus services. He also actively spoke out against the planned reductions in public transport routes.

The opposition party Fidesz delegated Vitézy as a member of the supervisory board of the Budapesti Közlekedési Zrt. (BKV), serving in this capacity from January 2007 to December 2009. As a member of the committee, he was the initiator of several internal investigations that led to the outbreak of later corruption scandals involving the city governance of Budapest under Mayor Gábor Demszky and Deputy Mayor Miklós Hagyó. During his activities, he was attacked several times, according to which he acts according to party political interests since his mother was a Fidesz politician. However, VEKE supported his efforts in this regard. Vitézy left the organization in 2010, following the 2010 Budapest Assembly election, when Fidesz candidate István Tarlós was elected as mayor.

=== CEO of BKK ===
Tarlós appointed Vitézy as the CEO of the newly established Centre for Budapest Transport (BKK) in November 2010. He held this position until December 2014. Under his leadership, BKK was responsible for public transport, bicycle and pedestrian transport, road infrastructure management, city parking, the regulation of taxi services and the implementation and organization of European Union projects related to transport. Under his mandate as CEO, the reorganizations and the comprehensive institutional reform of Budapest transport, which was launched when the company was founded with a team of 1,800 experts together with colleagues taken over from various Budapest companies (FKF, BKV, etc.), were completed successfully. Under Vitézy's leadership, BKK's achievements include the compilation of the Mór Balázs Plan, the new long-term sustainable mobility plan for Budapest.

During these years, the complete reconstruction of tram lines 1 and 3 was carried out, with the creation of grassed tram tracks in several places in Budapest in a previously unknown manner in Hungary; beside that the route of tram line 1 was also extended. BKK's own project was the realization of the interwoven tram network in Buda by connecting the separate tram lines and creating a new barrier-free infrastructure. In connection with this, the Széll Kálmán tér was completely renovated and expanded. An important result is the launch of the MOL BuBi public bicycle system in 2014 with more than 1,000 shared bikes. Additionally, BKK launched a comprehensive new vehicle procurement program, which marks the introduction of a hundred new modern low-floor buses, trolleybuses and trams into service in Budapest.

Under Vitézy, BKK successfully coordinated the launch of the new M4 metro line, including related infrastructure developments: a new bus station, P+R parking lots, public spaces and junctions were also established. In 4 years, BKK led by Dávid Vitézy produced a 20% increase in revenue from ticket sales with a 10% reduction in season tickets. The opening of modern integrated customer centers in several busy junctions has brought a significant quality change that is emblematic and directly perceptible to the traveling public. One of the most complex developments was the launch of the FUTÁR traffic management and passenger information system, which also made it possible to monitor the real situation of routes on a map. Route planning databases and real-time traffic data have become accessible to applications developed by third parties, including Google's travel planner. BKK installed 250 new ticket and pass machines throughout Budapest. Due to the Budapest Taxi Ordinance introduced in 2013 at the initiative of the BKK, the taxi service was reformed, as part of which the uniform yellow color was introduced for taxis, the option to pay by bank card was made mandatory in all vehicles, and strict quality and environmental protection standards were introduced.

Despite all this, the personal relationship between Tarlós and Vitézy was strained. Following the 2014 Budapest mayoral election, when Tarlós was re-elected, Vitézy was dismissed as CEO of BKK on 3 December 2014. Tarlós argued that BKK under Vitézy lost its role and became an over-bloated, over-expanding, autonomous company that became independent from the General Assembly of Budapest. He ironically called Vitézy as a "young, repressed genius and one-man mastermind legend", who is "almost impossible to work with because of his personality", arguing that all the realized developments were included in Tarlós' 2008 urban development program. Vitézy was succeeded as CEO by Kálmán Dabóczi on 1 January 2015. VEKE president Lajos Dorner also claimed that Vitézy acted as a political actor at the head of a professional organization, who "could not wait for opportunities to come, he wanted everything right away". According to an investigative report from October 2017, the rise of Russian influence contributed to Vitézy's ouster, since the latter did not support the renovation of Russian metro trains for M3 metro line, instead he supported the purchase of completely new subway trains from Western Europe. The Russians conducted an active discrediting campaign against Vitézy, which eventually led to his dismissal. Dabóczi reported his predecessor for violation of trade secrets and illegal possession of data assets, but the prosecution rejected the charge.

=== Later positions ===
Vitézy was appointed ministerial commissioner within the Ministry of National Development on 1 February 2015, overseeing the development of public transport, especially the coordination of regional and long-distance relations (MÁV and Volán). He held the position until 31 July in that year. Vitézy stated that his goal is to create a unified ticket purchase system that plans the route between any two settlements, regardless of the type of public transportation. Instead of merger of MÁV and Volán, Vitézy proposed the creation of an organization that jointly manages the two large transport systems as a customer, the purpose of which is to create a uniform timetable, tariff and passenger information system for passengers.

Vitézy became director of the Hungarian Technical and Transport Museum on 16 January 2016, which appointment was considered by the press to be pushed into the political background and Vitézy's marginalization. He served in this capacity until May 2022. However, the museum remained closed throughout under his management, after the main building was demolished in the City Park, but the selection of a new location was constantly postponed by the Hungarian government. Vitézy often spoke on transport policy issues in the following years. For instance, he criticized the disintegration of BKK in January 2016. He expressed his support in favor of the controversial proposal Budapest Museum Quarter. In addition to the criticism of the underground parking construction at József nádor Square, he protested against mayor István Tarlós' "anti-bicycle measures" and "retrograde transport plans" in April 2016. During a conference in May 2016, Vitézy supported the introduction of the congestion charge in Budapest and the development of suburban railway lines. He proposed that the pass system be extended to BuBi bicycles as well. Vitézy argued that Tarlós' management "have turned away from the public transport oriented approach and want to return to the seventies". He also spoke out against route reduction plans in August 2016.

The fourth Orbán government created the Budapest Development Center (BFK), a state institution coordinating governmental developments in Budapest and agglomeration, in early 2020. Vitézy was appointed CEO of the newly established organization on 21 January 2020. Vitézy emphasized that the BFK "does not mean an alternative town hall" against opposition mayor Gergely Karácsony, who defeated Tarlós in 2019. According to him, in the following years, the most important issue will be the implementation of the so-called "M5 metro line" project (also known as "north–south regional high-speed railway", a connection of public transport system from Szentendre to Ráckeve and Csepel through Budapest), a similar to the S-Bahn systems in Germany. Under his leadership, the BFK issued a tender for the complete renovation and modernization of the Budapest Nyugati station.

== Political career ==
After the 2022 Hungarian parliamentary election, Vitézy was appointed Secretary of State for Transport under Minister of Technology and Industry László Palkovics on 25 May 2022. Simultaneously, due to its increased powers, the BFK was transformed into a national organization under the name National Transportation Center (NKK). Vitézy chaired this organization on a temporary basis. Vitézy resigned as museum director in May 2022, following his appointment as state secretary. He was succeeded by Domonkos Schneller in the former position. The NKK was transferred to the Ministry of Construction and Investment under János Lázár in July 2022, and soon ceased to exist as an independent state institution. Lázár referred to the Russo-Ukrainian War and its consequent energy and economic crisis. Vitézy remained state secretary until the resignation of Palkovics in November 2022, which resulted the disintegration of the Ministry of Technology and Industry. Vitézy was succeeded as state secretary by Bálint Nagy.

Following his resignation, Vitézy became a vocal critic of the transport policy of the Orbán government. In March 2023, he accused János Lázár of hindering the development of railway transport, citing that the minister scrapped the project of the planned expansion of the Nyugati station. In the summer of that year, Vitézy emphasized MÁV's outdated equipment, which are already endangering the continuous operation, especially for branch lines and regional lines. He sharply criticized Lázár's decision to cancel ten railway lines. According to Vitézy, MÁV "became unable to provide the public service that the Hungarian state ordered from it". In the same time, Lázár also suspended the implementation of several railway projects (e.g. Galvani bridge). Vitézy argued these steps go against the European trend and reduce Hungary's competitiveness. In January 2024, Vitézy strongly opposed the reductions of BKV routes, which Gergely Karácsony withdrew as a result of the protests.

=== Candidate for mayor ===
Vitézy announced his candidacy for mayor of Budapest in the 2024 local elections on 19 March 2024. In his introductory speech, he outlined the five biggest problems to be solved: housing and expensive sublets, continuous traffic jams from the outer districts and agglomeration, deterioration of health care, little green space and development always only reaches the inner, tourist-frequented districts. His candidacy was endorsed by opposition LMP – Hungary's Green Party. Gergely Karácsony and the left-wing opposition parties accused Vitézy of being the "hidden" candidate of Fidesz, citing his former positions under the fourth and fifth Orbán governments and family relations to Orbán. According to Karácsony, the "official" candidate of Fidesz, Alexandra Szentkirályi would withdraw in favor of Vitézy sometime during the campaign. At the time, both Vitézy and Szentkirályi refused the allegations.

Vitézy campaigned to set up law enforcement on BKK lines against violent and homeless passengers. He pledged to build 10,000 new service apartments, and banish party politicians from the boards of Budapest companies, where he would also introduce the one-third female quota. He also said that the opposition between the capital city Budapest and the countryside is an outdated and artificially stimulated phenomenon by politics. He argued that the unsustainable increase in housing prices has resulted in people moving out of the city, while abandoned "rust zones" await development. According to Vitézy, "Sixty percent of commuters from the agglomeration cross the city limits by car, which is a very bad ratio." He asserted that Budapest had become a "political battleground" between the government and Karácsony, which resulted in the cessation of major investments and the halting of major developments. Vitézy also claimed that Karácsony uses his position as a "national opposition" and a "martyr". According to Vitézy, despite the headwind by the government, more could have been achieved during the five years.

A day before the official campaign began, on 19 April 2024, Vitézy presented his 101-point program with the title "There is much more to this city!". Among others, Vitézy promised the construction of 5 new tram lines, the renovation of suburban junctions, making of them fully accessible, and the rehaul of BHÉV lines and the complete replacement of vehicles, and the construction of parks along the banks of the Danube. On the same day, Jobbik candidate Koloman Brenner withdrew his candidacy and endorsed Vitézy.

On 31 May 2024, Vitézy took part in a YouTube debate with Karácsony, where he confronted the mayor with the non-fulfillment of his previous specific promises. Vitézy argued that Karácsony is too focused on party politics and has neglected the development of Budapest. Vitézy went on to claim that for Karácsony, Budapest is only a tool for his political battles against Fidesz.

Despite continuous denials, Szentkirályi subsequently withdrew, and declared that Fidesz would support Vitézy two days before the elections started. Pro-government media unanimously encouraged people to vote Vitézy for mayor, all the while, maintaining support for the Fidesz–KDNP list in the contemporaneous General Assembly election. As a reaction, Karácsony and the parties supporting him announced that this was the "end of Orbán's play", arguing that Vitézy was, in fact, the real candidate of Fidesz, whose "independence" served to confuse and divide anti-government voters. Vitézy denied these allegations, confirming that in the event of his victory, he would not form a coalition with either Fidesz or DK. According to Vitézy, the withdrawal was a unilateral decision by Fidesz, and it was not preceded by any secret pact. He urged those who support him as mayor to also support the VDB–LMP list in the general assembly vote.

According to official results, Vitézy lost the mayoral election by 324 votes. The election saw a record of invalid votes. Vitézy has officially called for a recount. He has claimed that there are could have been districts where the procedure used to declare certain votes as "invalid" may have been "faulty" and that there are "question marks" and "suspicions". In Hungary, a tight result does not warrant an immediate recount. According to Hungarian electoral law, a recount can only be called if something unlawful happened, and as such Vitézy must show concrete evidence for misconduct, otherwise, according to law, a recount cannot happen. The recount concluded on 12 July, with Karácsony retaining his victory and increasing his lead to 293 votes. In total, about 1,500 votes changed status, including 507 initially valid votes deemed invalid. Vitézy publicly conceded the election to Karácsony, and no further legal appeals were made. As the deadline for appeals also passed on 12 July, the election results were officially confirmed.

=== Member of the Budapest Assembly ===
Although Vitézy was defeated by Karácsony in the mayoral race, his VDB–LMP list gained three seats in the simultaneous Budapest Assembly election. Vitézy was himself also elected, and he formed the Podmaniczky Movement faction – named after 19th-century politician Frigyes Podmaniczky – in the General Assembly of Budapest. Taking his office on 1 October 2024, Vitézy became chairman of the Committee on Climate Protection, Transport and Urban Development, which was the most important committee in the general assembly. Vitézy's name was raised as deputy mayor, supported by the Tisza faction too, but Karácsony ultimately appointed Kata Tüttő against the majority of the general assembly. Beside the assembly group, Vitézy established a local patriotic organization also called Podmaniczky Movement on 17 November 2024.

During his assembly career, Vitézy was a vocal critic of Karácsony's mayoralty, accusing him of corruption and mismanagement. According to Vitézy, Karácsony remained a servant of the remaining socialist political corruption network, which maintained its influence even after the 2010 defeat. Otherwise, Vitézy cooperated with the mayor on several points: for instance, they both spoke out against the sale of the brownfield land Rákosrendező to United Arab Emirates investors. The Fidesz government's plan ultimately failed due to the protests, and Karácsony and Vitézy jointly conducted the international tender for the construction of the Rákosrendező. In addition, Vitézy remained a vocal critic of Lázár regarding the national transportation situation. These matters included, among others, the sale of buildings around railway stations that ultimately failed, the deteriorating situation of MÁV, the airport railway, the transportation museum that was moved to the countryside, and halted investments.

=== Minister for Transport and Investment ===
Following the victory of the Tisza Party in the 2026 elections, incoming Prime Minister Péter Magyar announced that Vitézy will be serving as Minister of Transport and Investment.
