= 2024 Budapest Assembly election =

- 9 June 2024

All 33 seats in the General Assembly of Budapest 17 seats needed for a majority
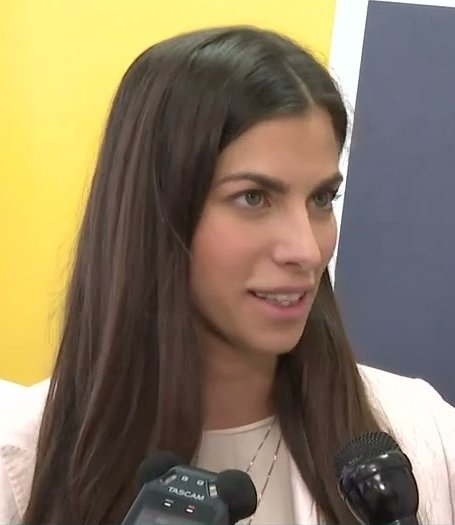

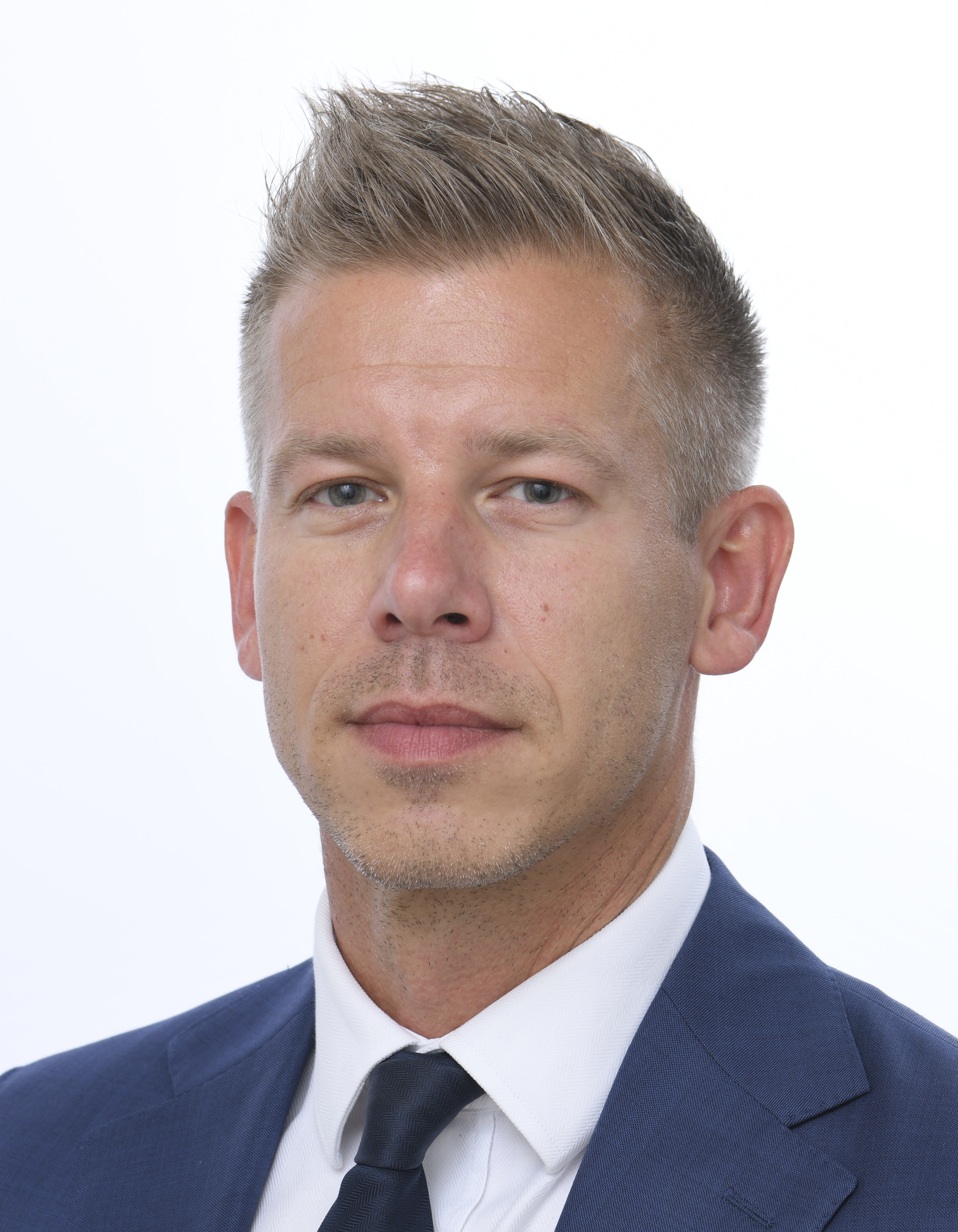

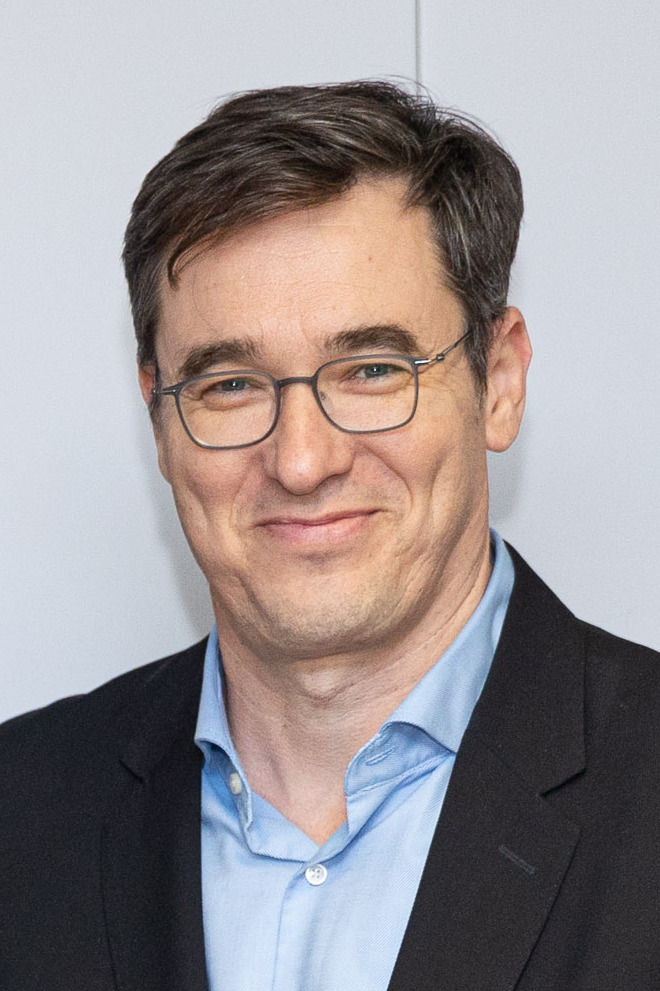

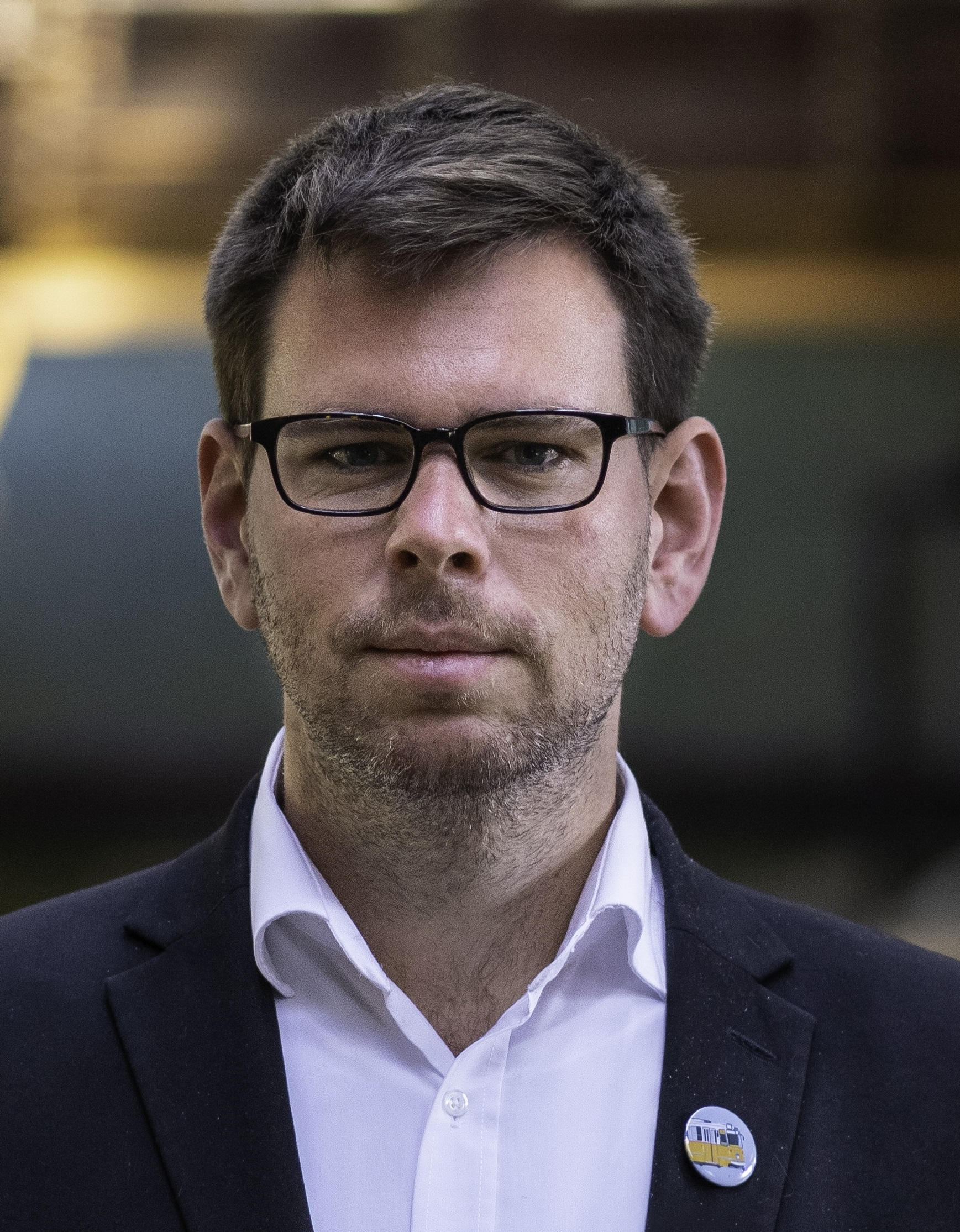

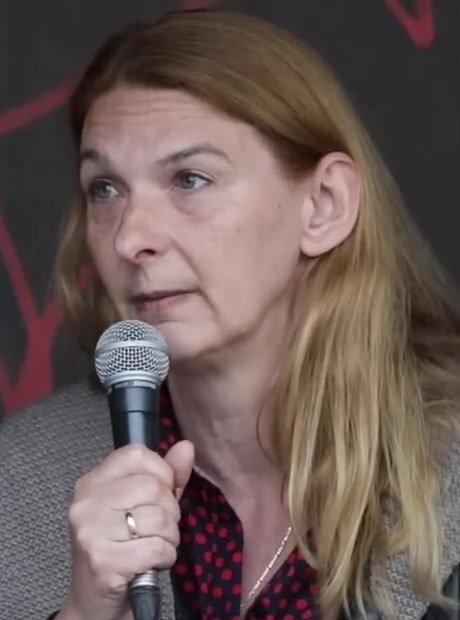
| | First party | Second party | Third party |
|---|---|---|---|
| Leader | Alexandra Szentkirályi | Péter Magyar | Gergely Karácsony |
| Party | Fidesz–KDNP | Tisza | DK-MSZP-Párbeszéd |
| Last election | 13 seats | New | 13 seats |
| Seats won | 10 | 10 | 7 |
| Seat change | ▼3 | New | ▼6 |
| Popular vote | 227,285 | 216,609 | 131,696 |
| Percentage | 28.69% | 27.34% | 16.62% |
| | Fourth party | Fifth party |
| Leader | Dávid Vitézy | Krisztina Baranyi |
| Party | VDB–LMP | MKKP |
| Last election | 0 seats (LMP) | 0 seats |
| Seats won | 3 | 3 |
| Seat change | ▲3 | ▲3 |
| Popular vote | 80,402 | 62,541 |
| Percentage | 10.15% | 7.89% |
- First place winners by district. Orange denotes districts where Fidesz came first, red denotes districts where TISZA came first.
Mayor before election
Gergely Karácsony
Dialogue
Elected Mayor
Gergely Karácsony
Dialogue

The 2024 Budapest Assembly election was held on 9 June 2024, concurrent with other local elections in Hungary. In December 2023, the Hungarian Parliament restored party-list proportional rules, which was last applied in the 2010 Budapest Assembly election. During the election, 32 representatives will be elected, while the Mayor of Budapest will be elected directly by popular vote at the same time.

== Background ==
During the 2014 and 2019 Budapest Assembly elections, voters elected the Mayor of Budapest, and the mayors of the 23 districts directly, while 9 seats in the assembly were distributed proportionally, taking into account votes cast for losing district mayoral candidates.

In October 2023, former liberal MP Gábor Fodor, who by then had become a vocal supporter of the ruling party Fidesz, proposed the restoration of the party-list proportional rules in the Budapest Assembly elections, which was applied between 1994 and 2010. According to Fodor, the dominance of the district mayors in the General Assembly of Budapest results in "the capital's aspects appearing less in the decisions". According to the opposition politicians, Fidesz prepared the amendment of the electoral law with this opinion article months before the election, in the same way as in 2014, along the lines of current political interests. Incumbent mayor Gergely Karácsony argued "It is not realistic that a minion of Viktor Orbán's regime would have come up with this proposal from his own wellhead". Fodor's idea was widely embraced by the pro-government media in the following weeks. Independent media Telex.hu analyzed that the amendment complicates the situation of the opposition parties, who are forced to cooperate while running separately in the simultaneously held European Parliament election.

The opposition Our Homeland Movement submitted the amendment proposal to the parliament in November 2023. According to them, "the current system favors the two largest political poles (Fidesz and the left-wing opposition), which does not correspond to democratic diversity". The parliament, with the government alliance Fidesz–KDNP's two-thirds majority, voted for the amendment to the law in December 2023, restoring the party list system after ten years.

== Election system ==
The old-new election system restored party-list proportional rules. List seats were distributed using the D'Hondt method. The 32 representative seats of the 33-member General Assembly of Budapest are allocated in proportion to the votes cast on party lists (the mayor is the 33th member of the assembly). A metropolitan list can be submitted by that party or organization that has a mayoral candidate in at least three districts or launch a candidate for the position of Mayor of Budapest. Parties whose lists reach the 5% entry threshold enter the General Assembly.

== Debates ==
| Location | Date | Participants | | | | | | | | | |
| Location | Date | DK-MSZP-Párbeszéd | Fidesz–KDNP | Momentum | MKKP | TISZA | VDB–LMP | MH | Munkáspárt | NP | Szolidaritás–LP7–HP |
|---|---|---|---|---|---|---|---|---|---|---|---|
| ATV | 2024-06-02 | check | ☒ | check | check | ☒ | check | check | not invited | | |

== Opinion polling ==
| Fieldwork date | Polling firm | Sample size | Fidesz–KDNP | DK | MSZP | Dialogue | MM | VDB | MH | MKKP | TISZA | Others/No preference | Lead |
|---|---|---|---|---|---|---|---|---|---|---|---|---|---|
| 4–6 June 2024 | Publicus | 1,042 | 24 | 23 | | | 7 | 16 | 1 | 9 | 20 | 1 | 1 |
| 23–25 May 2024 | Medián | 1,000 | 29 | 20 | | | 5 | 11 | 3 | 8 | 24 | – | 5 |
| 17–22 May 2024 | Medián | 1,000 | 31 | 23 | | | 6 | 7 | 4 | 12 | 16 | 1 | 8 |

== Results ==
| Party | Votes | % | +/– | Seats | +/– |
|---|---|---|---|---|---|
| Fidesz–KDNP | 227,285 | 28.69 | | 10 | –3 |
| Respect and Freedom Party | 216,609 | 27.34 | New | 10 | New |
| DK–MSZP–Dialogue | 131,696 | 16.62 | | 7 | –6 |
| VDB–LMP – Hungary's Green Party | 80,402 | 10.15 | | 3 | +3 |
| Hungarian Two-Tailed Dog Party | 62,541 | 7.89 | | 3 | +3 |
| Momentum Movement | 39,471 | 4.98 | | 0 | –4 |
| Our Homeland Movement | 30,208 | 3.81 | | 0 | 0 |
| Hungarian Workers' Party | 1,835 | 0.23 | | 0 | 0 |
| On the People's Side Party | 1,315 | 0.17 | New | 0 | New |
| Hungarian Solidarity Movement–L7–HP | 930 | 0.12 | New | 0 | New |
| Total | 792,292 | 100.00 | – | 33 | – |
| Valid votes | 792,292 | 98.29 | | | |
| Invalid/blank votes | 13,743 | 1.71 | | | |
| Total votes | 806,035 | 100.00 | | | |
| Registered voters/turnout | 1,333,795 | 60.43 | | | |
Source: NVI

=== Results by district ===
| District | Fidesz-KDNP | TISZA | DK–MSZP-Párbeszéd | VDB–LMP | MKKP | Momentum | MH | Munkáspárt | NP | Szolidaritás–L7–HP |
|---|---|---|---|---|---|---|---|---|---|---|
| I. | 33.50 | 25.40 | 14.15 | 9.35 | 9.38 | 5.33 | 2.66 | 0.14 | 0.04 | 0.06 |
| II. | 29.10 | 26.64 | 17.42 | 9.73 | 9.00 | 5.47 | 2.46 | 0.13 | 0.04 | 0.02 |
| III. | 27.81 | 28.52 | 17.53 | 10.19 | 7.33 | 4.38 | 3.87 | 0.19 | 0.14 | 0.03 |
| IV. | 27.23 | 28.48 | 18.93 | 9.92 | 6.99 | 3.84 | 4.03 | 0.25 | 0.29 | 0.04 |
| V. | 36.15 | 26.04 | 13.57 | 8.34 | 7.46 | 4.79 | 3.23 | 0.17 | 0.12 | 0.12 |
| VI. | 26.09 | 24.67 | 14.35 | 8.54 | 7.76 | 15.13 | 3.10 | 0.19 | 0.07 | 0.09 |
| VII. | 27.47 | 25.31 | 17.46 | 9.15 | 10.18 | 5.75 | 3.36 | 0.25 | 0.11 | 0.95 |
| VIII. | 33.62 | 23.25 | 14.37 | 8.54 | 10.42 | 6.07 | 3.15 | 0.25 | 0.19 | 0.14 |
| IX. | 25.82 | 28.06 | 13.99 | 10.23 | 13.12 | 4.80 | 3.43 | 0.25 | 0.15 | 0.16 |
| X. | 30.69 | 27.13 | 16.60 | 10.13 | 6.28 | 4.45 | 4.16 | 0.34 | 0.17 | 0.04 |
| XI. | 28.08 | 26.79 | 16.38 | 10.40 | 8.66 | 6.03 | 3.36 | 0.19 | 0.08 | 0.02 |
| XII. | 30.74 | 23.99 | 11.72 | 9.58 | 15.50 | 5.41 | 2.83 | 0.12 | 0.04 | 0.07 |
| XIII. | 20.99 | 30.25 | 21.73 | 9.84 | 8.43 | 5.23 | 3.07 | 0.28 | 0.12 | 0.07 |
| XIV. | 25.49 | 29.31 | 16.55 | 9.70 | 8.47 | 6.69 | 3.47 | 0.19 | 0.10 | 0.03 |
| XV. | 30.56 | 26.31 | 17.42 | 10.20 | 6.70 | 3.43 | 4.83 | 0.29 | 0.22 | 0.05 |
| XVI. | 32.40 | 28.17 | 13.68 | 10.14 | 6.45 | 4.47 | 4.08 | 0.17 | 0.12 | 0.32 |
| XVII. | 31.49 | 29.30 | 13.67 | 10.51 | 5.64 | 4.59 | 4.37 | 0.21 | 0.18 | 0.04 |
| XVIII. | 29.39 | 25.37 | 21.46 | 10.52 | 5.22 | 2.87 | 4.58 | 0.26 | 0.28 | 0.06 |
| XIX. | 28.86 | 26.35 | 18.74 | 10.11 | 6.86 | 4.10 | 4.37 | 0.32 | 0.24 | 0.05 |
| XX. | 31.39 | 27.19 | 15.32 | 10.15 | 6.43 | 3.40 | 4.73 | 0.31 | 0.29 | 0.80 |
| XXI. | 27.17 | 27.75 | 15.65 | 13.95 | 5.62 | 3.96 | 5.02 | 0.37 | 0.44 | 0.09 |
| XXII. | 31.40 | 26.77 | 13.74 | 10.34 | 7.02 | 5.74 | 4.54 | 0.17 | 0.15 | 0.14 |
| XXIII. | 30.55 | 29.97 | 12.88 | 10.93 | 5.84 | 3.50 | 5.42 | 0.46 | 0.34 | 0.11 |
| Total | 28.69 | 27.34 | 16.62 | 10.15 | 7.89 | 4.98 | 3.81 | 0.23 | 0.17 | 0.12 |

== Party lists ==
=== Overview ===
| Party | Length of list | Seats won |
|---|---|---|
| Fidesz-KDNP | 96 | 10 |
| TISZA | 14 | 10 |
| DK–MSZP-Párbeszéd | 69 | 6 |
| VDB–LMP | 32 | 3 |
| MKKP | 15 | 3 |
| Momentum | 31 | 0 |
| MH | 32 | 0 |
| Munkáspárt | 17 | 0 |
| NP | 3 | 0 |
| Szolidaritás–LP7–HP | 10 | 0 |

=== Candidates ===
| | Fidesz–KDNP | TISZA | DK–MSZP-Párbeszéd | VDB–LMP | MKKP | Momentum | MH | Munkáspárt | NP | Szolidaritás–L7–HP |
|---|---|---|---|---|---|---|---|---|---|---|
| 1. | Alexandra Szentkirályi | Péter Magyar | Gergely Karácsony | Dávid Vitézy | Krisztina Baranyi | Anna Donáth | András Grundtner | Gyula Thürmer | Béla Ruttensdorfer | Sándor Székely |
| 2. | Botond Sára | Eszter Ordas | Sándor Szaniszló | József Gál | Gergely Kovács | Tamás Soproni | Csongor Vékony | László Kerezsi | Nóra Kerékgyártó | György Hunwald |
| 3. | László Böröcz | Áron Porcher | Kata Tüttő | Margit Szilágyi | Zsuzsanna Döme | Gábor Havasi | Csaba Balog | Tamás Fléger | Attila Oravecz | Jolán Hegedűs |
| 4. | Franciska Janó-Veilandics | Szilvia Böröck-Gémes | Richárd Barabás | Dávid Merker | Dávid Nagy | Gábor Kerpel-Fronius | Tibor Pajor | György Barabás | | Dániel Cséplő |
| 5. | Piroska Szalai | Annamária Barna | Tibor Déri | Anna Süveg | Zoltán Bürger | Tünde Szkaliczki | Károly Kvacskay | Péter Gál | | László Nemes |
| 6. | Dániel Szécsényi | György Bovier | András Béres | Márton Barta | Tekla Kocsik | Eszter Kabos | András Bartal | Gábor Baranyi | | Géza Vincze |
| 7. | Zoltán Havasi | András Kulja | Dorottya Keszthelyi | Borbála Hutiray | Kitti Ignáth | Dániel Berg | Csaba Binder | Attila Gazsó | | György Simon |
| 8. | Ádám Sinkovics | Eszter Lakos | Csaba Horváth | Can Togay | Miklós Mendly | Dániel Rádai | János Czeglédi | Zoltán Zilahi | | Éva Pál |
| 9. | Béla Radics | Gabriella Gerzsenyi | Attila Jószai | Balázs Kocsis | Dávid Kovács | Bálint Gergely | Attila Merha | Márk Preyer | | Ádám Galba-Deák |
| 10. | Péter Böjthe | Kinga Kollár | Zita Bakai-Nagy | Katalin Szabó-Kellner | Gyöngyi Abonyi | Diána Stemler | József Juhász | Éva Nagy | | Károly Kál |
| 11. | István György | Andrea Bujdosó | Zoltán Bodnár | Bálint Dományi | Zoltán Várady | András Dukán | Zoltán Tóth | Noémi Terék | | |
| 12. | Tamás Elekes | Dániel Molnár | Károly Lukoczki | László Heltai | Péter Győrffy | Csaba Farkas | Patrik Szecsődi | Sándor Mocsári | | |
| 13. | Kamilla Tóth | István Orbán | Gábor Nemes | Orsolya Megellai | Norbert Ferancz | Andrea Kerekes | Anna Marosvölgyi | Mária Kereszturi | | |
| 14. | Sándor Szarvas | Balázs Balogh | Hanna Sólyomfi | Gergely Horn | Kornél Kiss | Márton Pataki | Attila Nagy | István Fodor | | |
| 15. | Demeter Szilágyi | | György Nagy | Balázs Édes | Krisztina Kazinczy | Áron Iker | Attila Kovács | László Szabó | | |
| 16. | Andrea Gyurákovics | | Péter Gajda | Krisztián Varga | | Koppány Szarvas | Mónika Árendás | Ferenc Végh | | |
| 17. | Péter Kun-Gazda | | Zoltán Mustó | Izabella Fekete | | Zsófia Naszádos | György Ébl | András Fehér | | |
| 18. | Ádám Gyepes | | Ferenc Csizmazia | Pál Nényi | | Zalán Portik | László Fazekas | | | |
| 19. | Károly Takaró | | Márton Kovács | Tas Tóbiás | | Patrik Lengyel | István Zahuczki | | | |
| 20. | Zoltán Dudás | | Katalin Fekete | Attila Vida | | Péter Szaló | Sándor Szabó | | | |
| ... | | | | | | | | | | |
| 40. | Anna Szepesfalvy | | Abd el Rahim Ali | | | | | | | |
| ... | | | | | | | | | | |
| 50. | Gergely Kristóf Gulyás | | Ádám Kemény | | | | | | | |
| | ... | | ... | | | | | | | |
Assembly member; Assembly member as Lord Mayor; Won from list, but declined assembly seat
