= Budapest 15th constituency =

Hungarian legislative district

Budapest 15th constituency (District XVIII.)
- Constituency for the National Assembly
- Location of Budapest 15 within Budapest

- Location of Budapest within Hungary
- City: Budapest
- Electorate: 79,937 (2018)
- Major settlements: 18th District

Current constituency
- Created: 2011
- Party: Tisza Party
- Member: Áron Porcher
- Elected: 2026

The 15th constituency of Budapest (Hungarian: Budapesti 15. számú országgyűlési egyéni választókerület) is one of the single-member constituencies of the National Assembly, the national legislature of Hungary. The constituency standard abbreviation: Budapest 15. OEVK.

Since 2026, it has been represented by Áron Porcher of the Tisza Party.

== Geography ==
The 15th constituency is located in southeastern part of Pest.

=== List of districts ===
The constituency includes the following municipalities:

1. District XVIII.: Full part of the district.

== Members ==
The constituency was first represented by László Kucsák of the Fidesz from 2014 to 2018. Ágnes Kunhalmi of the MSZP was elected in 2018. In the 2026 election, Áron Porcher of the Tisza Party was elected representative.

Election	Member	Party	%
2014	László Kucsák	Fidesz	
2018	Ágnes Kunhalmi	MSZP	
2022	Ágnes Kunhalmi	MSZP	44.6
2026	Áron Porcher	TISZA	61.4
