= 2024 Budapest mayoral election =

Budapest mayoral election in 2024

- 9 June 2024
- Turnout: 60.51%
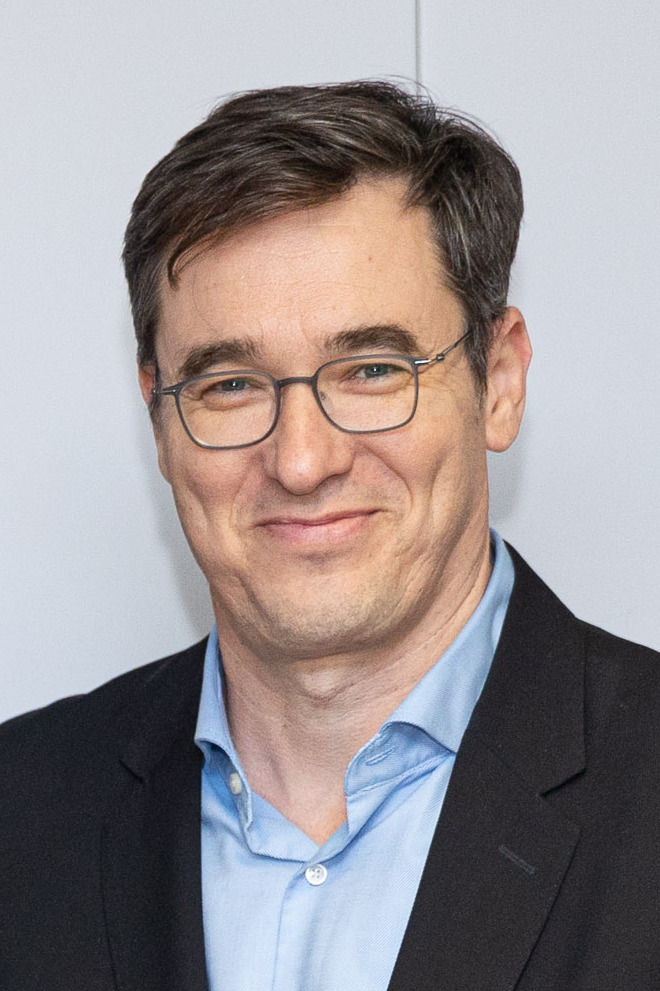

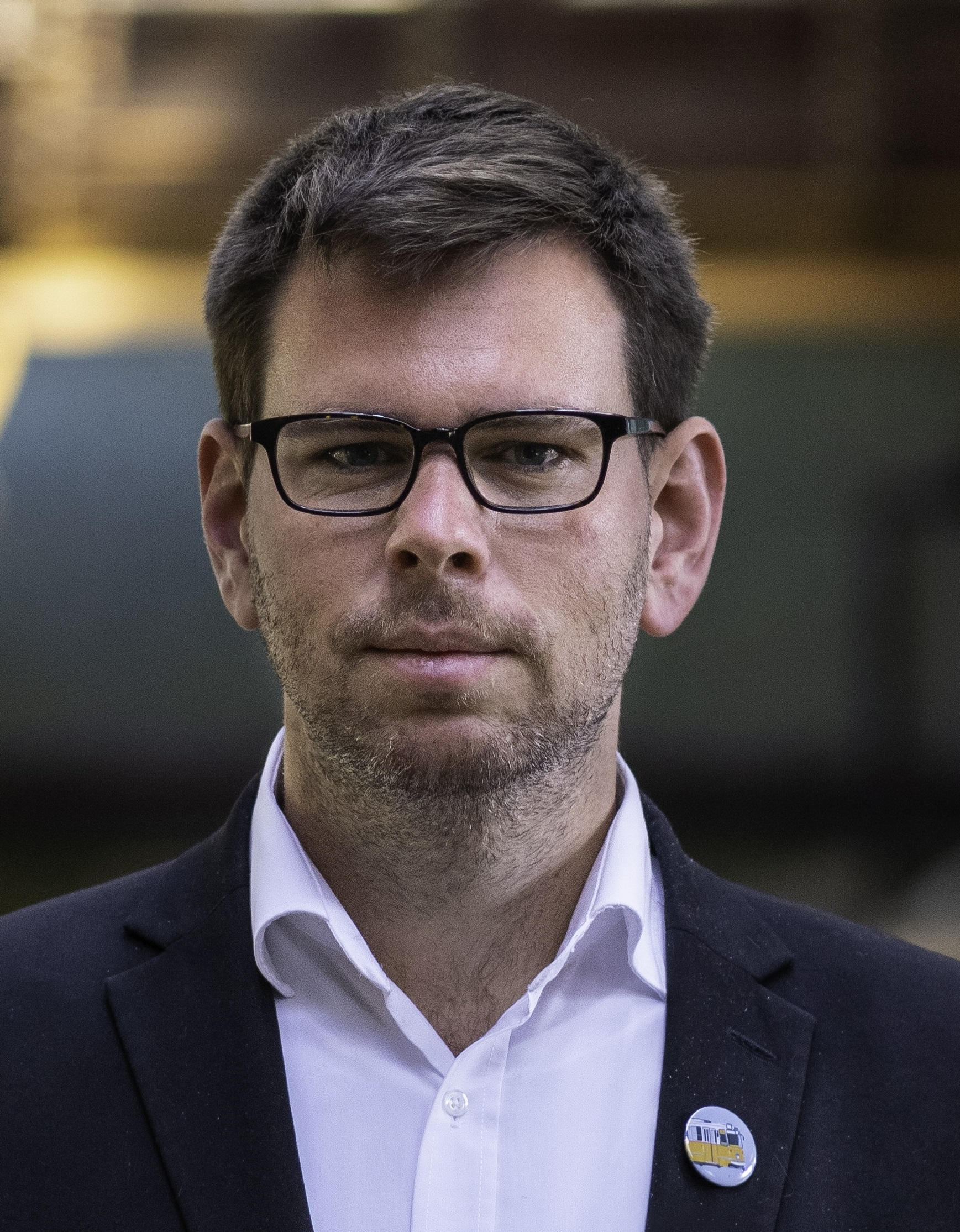
Candidate	Gergely Karácsony	Dávid Vitézy
Party	Párbeszéd	VDB
Alliance	DK–MSZP–Párbeszéd	VDB–LMP
Popular vote	371,538	371,245
Percentage	47.53%	47.49%
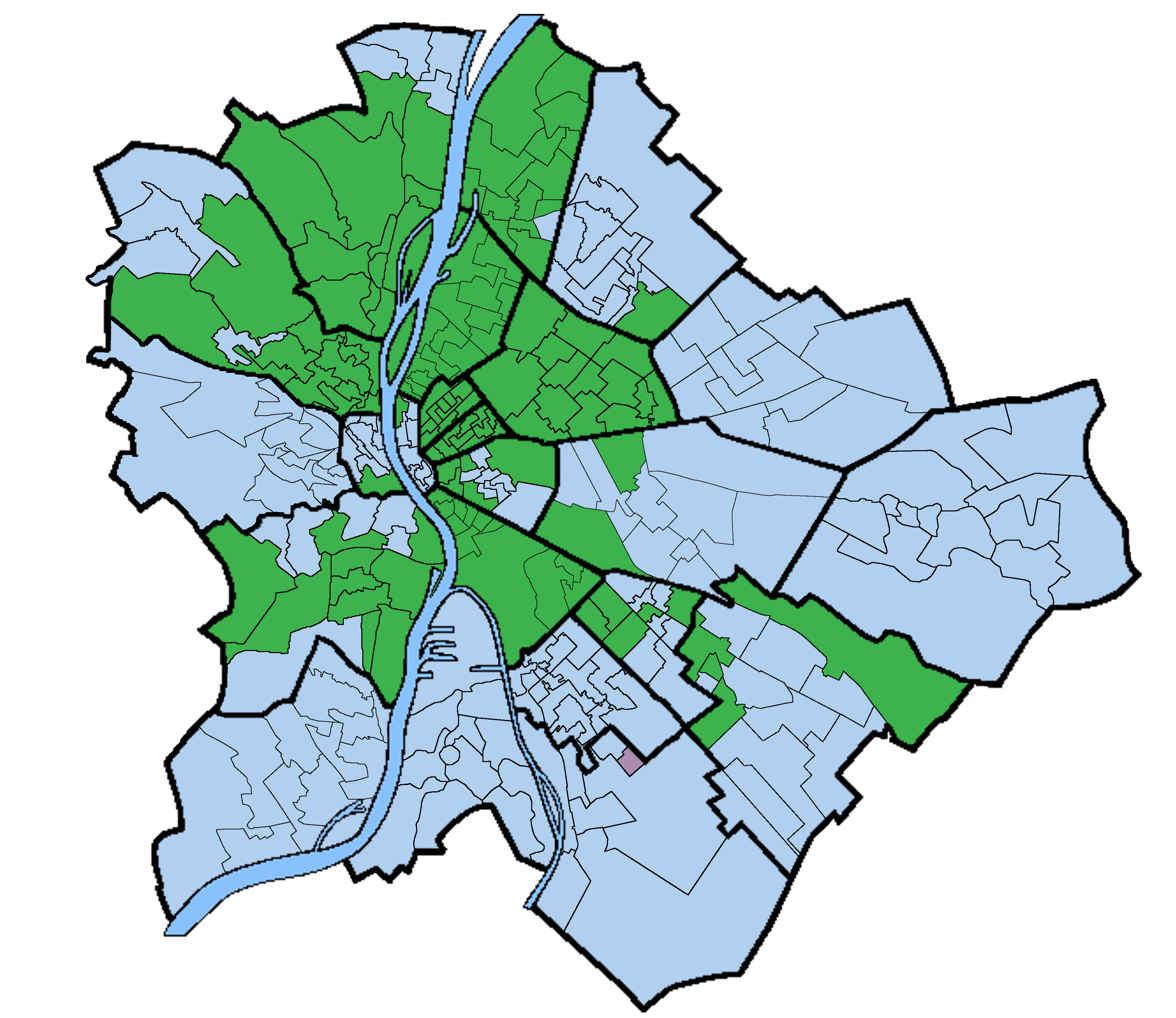
- Green denotes districts won by Karácsony, while light blue denotes districts won by Vitézy.
Mayor before election
Gergely Karácsony
Dialogue
Elected Mayor
Gergely Karácsony
Dialogue

The 2024 Budapest mayoral election was held on 9 June 2024 to elect the mayor of Budapest (főpolgármester). The elected mayor only took office in October. On the same day, local elections were held throughout Hungary, including the districts of Budapest which will determine the composition of the General Assembly. The election was run using a first-past-the-post voting system. The winner of the election would serve for a term of five years.

As the two top-placed candidates, Gergely Karácsony and Dávid Vitézy were only separated by 324 votes, a partial recount took place due to the abnormally large numbers of invalid ballots. On 12 June, Vitézy filed for appeal, and the National Electoral Office decided on recounting all of the invalid votes across the city on 14 June. After the recount, Karácsony retained the mayorship by an advantage of only 41 votes, or 0.005% against Vitézy; however, Karácsony filed for appeal and sought a repeat of the election in the entire city. On 26 June, the Curia rejected Karácsony's appeal for a repeat election. The Constitutional Court annulled the Curia's decision, after which it ordered a city wide recount of all valid votes to be conducted between 9–11 July. The recount determined that Karácsony won by 293 votes.

== Candidates ==
=== Announced candidates ===
- Gergely Karácsony, incumbent Mayor (2019–), supported by DK, MSZP, Dialogue and Momentum
- Dávid Vitézy, former director of the Centre for Budapest Transport (2010–2014), former state secretary for transportation (2022), supported by LMP
- András Grundtner, supported by Our Homeland Movement

=== Withdrawn candidates ===
- Koloman Brenner, member of parliament (2018–), supported by Jobbik; withdrew on 19 April 2024, in favor of Dávid Vitézy.
- Alexandra Szentkirályi, government spokesperson (2020–2024), former deputy mayor of Budapest (2014–2019), supported by Fidesz-KDNP; withdrew on 7 June 2024, in favor of Dávid Vitézy.

== Campaign ==
=== Gergely Karácsony (DK–MSZP–Párbeszéd) ===
Incumbent mayor Gergely Karácsony announced his intention to run for a second term on 20 March 2023. He became the joint candidate of the newly formed DK–MSZP–Dialogue Alliance for the position of mayor on 28 March 2024, also leading its General Assembly party list. The Momentum Movement endorsed Karácsony's mayoral candidacy as well, but decided to run in the election with a separate party list.

During his campaign, Karácsony referred to Budapest as a “republic” and an “island of freedom.” He argued that the people of Budapest would have an easy choice in the election because, for the citizens of the capital, the government only offers a “declaration of war.” According to him, the values that the government’s policies oppose are upheld in Budapest. Karácsony emphasized that, in addition to the COVID-19 pandemic and the global energy crisis, the Fidesz government has taken significant powers and financial resources from Budapest over the past five years purely for political purposes. This, he claimed, destabilized the city’s budget, delaying or even preventing many projects. During his campaign, Karácsony argued that the future of the city hinges on its ability to provide affordable housing in the short and long term. To achieve this, he planned to rely on directly accessible EU funds, bypassing the government’s distributive role. He cited his ability to work with the government, pointing to the establishment of a common tariff system with the participation of Hungarian State Railways (MÁV), Volánbusz and Budapesti Közlekedési Zrt.. Under Karácsony, the BuBi bicycle sharing network was also re-organized and expanded. He established a housing agency to provide municipal housing for the homeless. The reconstruction of Metro Line M3 was also completed under his term. The Széchenyi Chain Bridge and Blaha Lujza tér were also renovated.

Karácsony alleged during the campaign that independent candidate Dávid Vitézy was a covert candidate of Fidesz alongside the “official” candidate, Szentkirályi, predicting that one of them would eventually withdraw. Both Vitézy and Szentkirályi denied the allegations. Despite the continuous denials, Szentkirályi did withdraw on 7 June. Karácsony and the opposition parties that supported him declared this the “end of Orbán’s ploy,” arguing that Vitézy was Fidesz’s real candidate, aiming to confuse and split anti-government voters. Karácsony claimed this was Fidesz’s plan all along, as opposition parties are clearly in the majority in the capital. He argued that Vitézy, if elected with Fidesz’s support, would not effectively oppose the ruling party. According to him, the city is strong until its backbone is broken. "The mayorship of Dávid Vitézy would send a message that Budapest was silenced and oppressed", he argued. He stated that the people of Budapest must choose between “the power of the people or the people of power.” Karácsony claimed that Vitézy’s supporters had become victims of an “evil power struggle” and insisted that “there is only one Fidesz, whose goal is to preserve its power and economic interests.” He added that Vitézy’s ambitious visions could only be realized with government financial support and suggested that Vitézy was unaware of the true state of the city’s budget.

=== Dávid Vitézy (VDB–LMP) ===
Transport and urban mobility expert Dávid Vitézy announced his candidacy on 19 March 2024, representing his own civic organization Association with Dávid Vitézy for Budapest (VDB) and LMP – Hungary's Green Party. During his campaign, Vitézy presented himself as a technocratic outsider, rejecting both Fidesz government policies and the left-wing opposition that has administered Budapest. According to him, Budapest has become a political battleground between the government and Karácsony since 2019, resulting in stalled major investments and halted developments. He claimed that Karácsony used his position as a “national opposition” and “martyr,” and argued that, even amid governmental opposition, more progress could have been made over the past five years if continuous negotiations had taken place.

Vitézy outlined five major issues that needed to be addressed: housing affordability, persistent traffic congestion from outer districts and the suburbs, deteriorating healthcare, lack of green spaces, and development efforts that focus only on tourist-heavy inner districts. He proposed deploying law enforcement on BKK lines to address issues with violent and homeless passengers, constructing 10,000 new service apartments, and removing party politicians from the boards of Budapest companies, while implementing a one-third female quota on these boards. He presented his 101-point programme with the title "This city has so much more potential". Among others, Vitézy promised to build five new tram lines, renovate suburban junctions to improve accessibility, upgrade BHÉV lines with a full replacement of vehicles, and establish green parks along the Danube riverbanks. On the same day, Jobbik candidate Koloman Brenner withdrew his candidacy and endorsed Vitézy. Vitézy took part in a harsh YouTube debate with Karácsony on 31 May 2024 (Partizán), during which he confronted the mayor over unfulfilled campaign promises. Vitézy argued that Karácsony prioritized party politics over Budapest’s development, treating the city as a “shadow government” and a tool for his political battles against Fidesz.

Throughout the campaign, Vitézy’s previous affiliation with the ruling Fidesz party led to questions about his independence. Furthermore, LMP leader Péter Ungár was regarded as part of the “systemic opposition” within Viktor Orbán's regime. The European Green Party formally suspended LMP's membership due to its support of Vitézy. Meanwhile, government-aligned media launched a defamatory campaign against Gergely Karácsony, yet remained silent on Vitézy’s candidacy, failing to mention it in their reports. Karácsony and the left-wing opposition parties accused Vitézy of being a “hidden” candidate for Fidesz, citing his former roles and family connections within Orbán’s governments. Karácsony speculated that Fidesz’s “official” candidate, Alexandra Szentkirályi, would eventually withdraw in Vitézy’s favor. Both Vitézy and Szentkirályi denied these allegations. However, Szentkirályi indeed withdrew her candidacy and endorsed Vitézy on 7 June 2024, two days before the election. Pro-government media unanimously encouraged the election of Vitézy, but the support of the Fidesz–KDNP list in the simultaneous General Assembly election. Karácsony and his supporting opposition parties claimed this was the “end of Orbán’s ploy,” arguing that Vitézy was the real Fidesz candidate, his supposed independence designed to confuse and divide anti-government voters. Vitézy denied these accusations, stating that he would not form a coalition with either Fidesz or DK if elected. He claimed that Szentkirályi’s withdrawal was a unilateral decision by Fidesz, unaccompanied by any secret agreement. He emphasized that those supporting him as mayor should also support the VDB–LMP list in the General Assembly vote.

=== Alexandra Szentkirályi (Fidesz–KDNP) ===
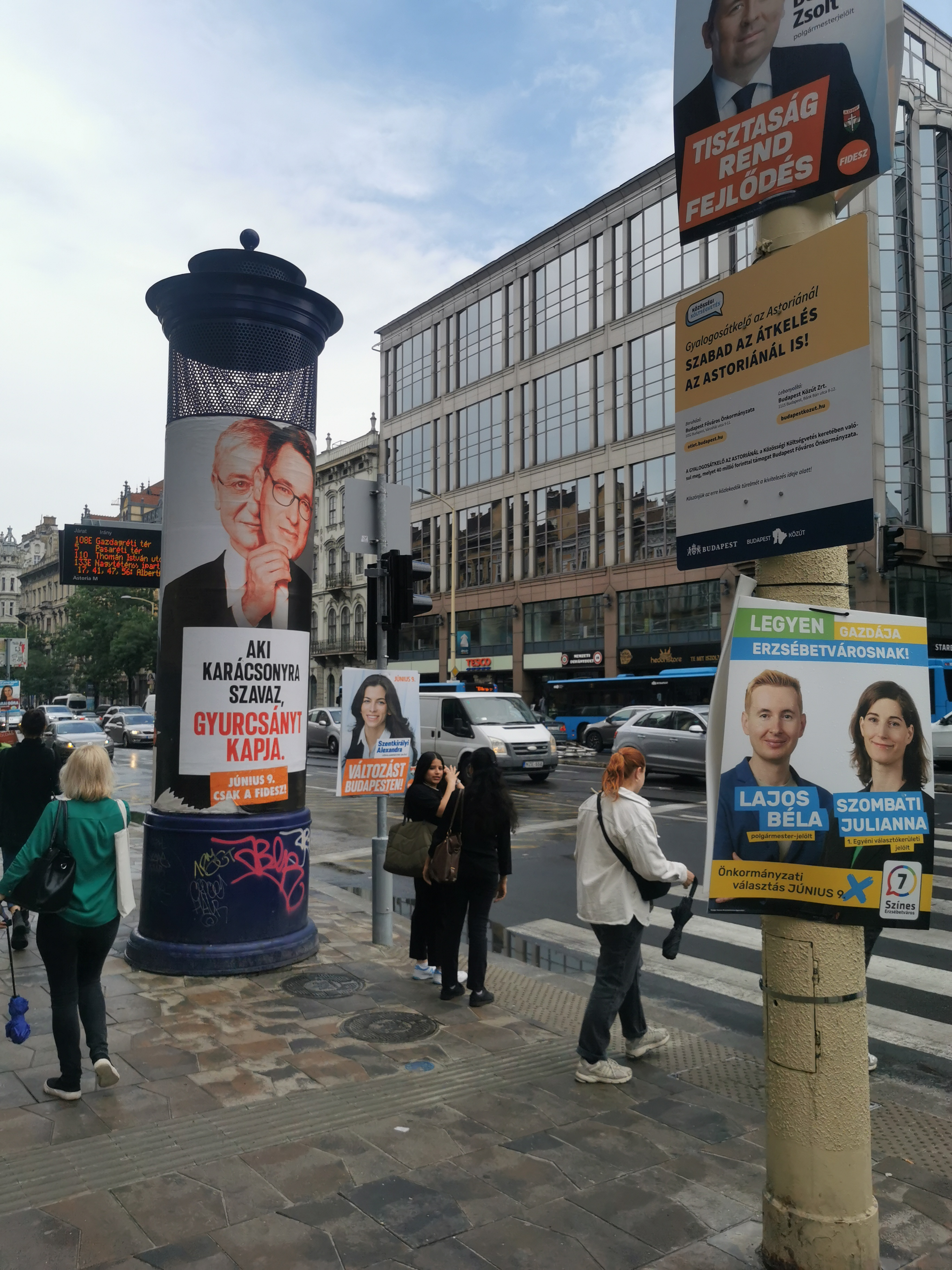
Szentkirályi's poster next to Fidesz's, which equalizes Karácsony with Ferenc Gyurcsány

On 14 March 2024, it was announced that Alexandra Szentkirályi, the party spokesperson and former deputy mayor, would be Fidesz’s candidate for Mayor of Budapest in the 2024 election. During her campaign, Szentkirályi ran an exclusively defamatory campaign against Karácsony, frequently referring to him as the “puppet” of former prime minister and opposition leader Ferenc Gyurcsány. Using the slogan “Budapest needs change,” she sought to demonstrate Karácsony’s incompetence through numerous TikTok videos, though she did not publish her own program or vision. Fidesz leaders, including Prime Minister Viktor Orbán, remained notably passive during her campaign, leading analysts to speculate that Fidesz had anticipated a potential defeat. Szentkirályi refused to participate in debates with Karácsony and Vitézy and, aside from pro-government media, did not give any interviews.

Karácsony speculated that Fidesz’s “official” candidate, Szentkirályi, would eventually withdraw in favor of Vitézy. Both Vitézy and Szentkirályi denied these allegations throughout the campaign. However, Szentkirályi did withdraw her candidacy on 7 June, two days before the election, and endorsed Vitézy. Pro-government media unanimously supported Vitézy’s mayoral bid while endorsing the Fidesz–KDNP list in the simultaneous General Assembly election.

=== András Grundtner (MH) ===
The far-right Our Homeland Movement nominated jurist András Grundtner as their mayoral candidate on 2 September 2023. During his campaign, he spoke out against car traffic restrictions (such as those on the Chain Bridge) and promised to ban Budapest Pride if elected.

Grundtner was not invited to the mayoral debate on 31 May but participated in the debate of party list leaders on 2 June. In this debate, Grundtner rejected both the Orbán government’s and the city leadership’s narratives. He argued that while Budapest and Hungary are interdependent, this relationship is currently unworkable “because Budapest has started to break away from the body of the nation.” He claimed the city administration must maintain good relations with the government to secure adequate subsidies. Grundtner also highlighted concerns about public safety, alleging that “no-go tram routes” exist in the city, and noted the demographic decline of Hungarians, who are moving to the suburbs or abroad, while immigration, primarily from the Third World, has increased in recent years. Additionally, he attributed the rising real estate prices to demand from Airbnb, university students, and residential park developments for investment purposes, advocating for immediate intervention.

Following Szentkirályi’s withdrawal (see above), Grundtner argued that Our Homeland “remains the only force offering a path forward for the nationally committed, tradition-loving population of the capital.” He characterized both Karácsony and Vitézy as part of a “downtown progressive-liberal elitist club” aiming to “drown Budapest in a multicultural swamp”.

=== Debates ===
2024 Budapest Mayoral election debates
Date	Broadcasters	P Present I Invited A Absent N Not invited			
Date	Broadcasters	Karácsony	Szentkirályi	Vitézy	Grundtner
31 May	Partizán	P	A	P	N

== Opinion polling ==
Pollster/client(s)	Date(s) conducted	Sample size						
Pollster/client(s)	Date(s) conducted	Sample size	Karácsony	Szentkirályi	Vitézy	Brenner	Grundtner	Undecided
Nézőpont	7 June 2024	500	45%	–	52%	–	2%	–
Publicus	4–6 June 2024	1,042	50%	20%	28%	–	2%	–
Publicus	4–6 June 2024	1,042	64%	32%	–	–	3%	–
Publicus	4–6 June 2024	1,042	50%	–	47%	–	3%	–
Századvég	30 May–4 June 2024	1000	42%	–	48%	–	4%	6%
Századvég	30 May–4 June 2024	1000	40%	27%	28%	–	2%	3%
Medián	23–25 May 2024	1000	41%	–	40%	–	–	20%
Medián	23–25 May 2024	1000	38%	23%	21%	–	–	19%
Medián	17–22 May 2024	1000	46%	26%	24%	–	4%	–
Republikon	7–10 May 2024	800	40%	30%	25%	–	3%	3%
Publicus	6–10 May 2024	1055	46%	19%	23%	–	3%	9%
Publicus	6–10 May 2024	1055	53%	25%	–	–	2%	21%
Publicus	6–10 May 2024	1055	47%	–	36%	–	2%	16%
Závecz Research	15–21 April 2024	?	38%	16%	22%	–	1%	23%
Pulzus	19–21 Mar 2024	500	39%	16%	22%	1%	2%	20%
Republikon	21–23 Feb 2024	800	53%	–	34%	4%	9%	–
Republikon	10-28 Jul 2023	1500	42%	36%	–	–	5%	17%

== Result ==
Candidate	Party	Votes	%
Gergely Karácsony	Dialogue–DK–MSZP	371,538	47.53
Dávid Vitézy	VDB–LMP – Hungary's Green Party	371,245	47.49
András Grundtner	Our Homeland Movement	38,984	4.99
Total		781,767	100.00
Valid votes		781,767	96.96
Invalid/blank votes		24,548	3.04
Total votes		806,315	100.00
Registered voters/turnout		1,333,795	60.45
Source: NVI

=== Results by district ===
District	Karácsony	Vitézy	Grundtner
I.	44.44	51.92	3.64
II.	49.69	47.49	2.81
III.	47.81	47.32	4.87
IV.	49.43	45.19	5.38
V.	43.75	51.87	4.38
VI.	52.68	42.98	4.34
VII.	51.66	43.66	4.68
VIII.	46.42	48.60	4.98
IX.	50.06	45.49	4.45
X.	45.37	48.62	6.01
XI.	48.25	47.79	3.96
XII.	46.52	50.30	3.18
XIII.	56.04	40.20	3.76
XIV.	50.80	44.86	4.34
XV.	44.86	48.46	6.68
XVI.	43.70	51.08	5.23
XVII.	42.96	50.88	6.16
XVIII.	46.41	47.61	5.98
XIX.	47.40	47.01	5.60
XX.	43.55	49.86	6.63
XXI.	43.11	49.69	7.20
XXII.	44.17	50.35	5.48
XXIII.	41.53	51.28	7.18
Total	47.53	47.49	4.99

== Aftermath ==
Shortly after midnight on 10 June, with over 90% of the vote reported and a narrow lead of a few dozen votes, Dávid Vitézy held a press conference expressing uncertainty over whether the official results would be finalized by morning. He described the election as extremely close and mentioned the possibility of a recount regardless of the outcome. Vitézy also expressed disappointment that Karácsony had consistently refused to answer his calls, where Vitézy intended to propose a mutual agreement for a recount.

At 3:00 am, Gergely Karácsony claimed victory at City Hall, thanking Budapest for choosing to remain a “republic” instead of a “company” under Fidesz leadership. Later that morning, a far-right outlet, Kuruc.info, released a recording in which Karácsony allegedly threatened Vitézy with “blackmail” and expressed a desire to “beat him with a shovel”. The next day, in an interview with the liberal outlet Telex, Karácsony acknowledged the recording’s authenticity but downplayed its importance.

On 11 June, Vitézy revealed issues with ballot handling. Due to Fidesz–KDNP candidate Alexandra Szentkirályi’s withdrawal two days before the election, her name had to be manually removed from ballots. However, in certain districts, the removal did not meet legal standards, with her name simply crossed out with a thin line, creating the impression she was still a candidate. According to Dávid Merker, an ally of Vitézy, “thousands” of ballots marked for both Vitézy and the faintly crossed-out Szentkirályi were invalidated instead of being counted for Vitézy. Vitézy argued this contributed to the unusually high invalid vote count, which exceeded his margin of loss by a significant factor. Consequently, Vitézy’s team requested an official recount in districts where electoral irregularities were suspected. The results were scheduled to be certified on 13 June.

On 12 June, Vitézy held a press conference detailing ballot-handling issues and the serious irregularities his team had previously reported. Two districts, namely Újpest and Erzsébetváros, saw record high number of invalid votes; 5.02% and 6.08%, respectively, while this rate was only around 2-2.5% in other districts. Moreover, Vitézy presented the press with a map showing that invalid votes for the mayoral election were significantly higher in these districts than for the City Assembly vote, with these discrepancies disappearing at polling stations across the street in different districts. Suggested causes included a deliberate choice to use a faint line to cross out Szentkirályi’s name, making it easily overlooked, along with misunderstandings of electoral law by voting supervisors. Districts II and XVI, where Szentkirályi’s name was made illegible with a bold black overprint, had very few invalid votes, and no irregularities were reported in districts II, V, and XVI. However, in over 200 polling stations across the remaining 20 districts, irregularities emerged, which were legally documented by voters, election committee members, or observers.

At 3:30 pm, Vitézy filed official documents with the Capital Electoral Office to appeal the outcome, requesting a full recount of all invalid votes across Budapest. He argued that a recount was essential for legitimacy, as fraud allegations could undermine confidence in the new mayor. The Capital Electoral Office forwarded the appeal to the National Electoral Office, which would then decide on the recount. On 13 June, Karácsony called for a complete re-election, regardless of the recount’s outcome.

On 14 June, the National Electoral Office declared the recount results, with Karácsony’s lead narrowing to just 41 votes. Karácsony announced his intention to appeal the decision to the Curia (Hungary's Supreme Court), arguing that procedural irregularities warranted a new election. Vitézy also filed an appeal, but only for DK-lead Districts IV. and VII. They submitted their motion to the Curia on 17 June, which were rejected on 26 June, upholding the validity of the recount. That day, Karácsony affirmed he would have gone through with a repeated election, but "the Curia's decision closed that debate".

Previously, Vitézy had suggested Karácsony could initiate a new election by resigning, an option Karácsony declined. After the Curia's decision, Vitézy argued Karácsony promised to take all legal means, and he still had the means to appeal to the Constitutional Court, saying he considers Karácsony a legitimate mayor, but "if we take Gergely Karácsony's previous words seriously, he does not consider himself to be one". On 30 June, Vitézy himself filed a complaint to the Constitutional Court, arguing the Curia's decision was unconstitutional.

On 5 July, the Constitutional Court annulled the Curia’s decision, citing a breach of the right to a fair trial. The Curia had ignored requests to recount valid votes; the Constitutional Court argued that, since some invalid votes were accepted on recount, some previously valid votes could also be found invalid. Though a new election was no longer possible (the deadline expired on 7 July), the Curia could still order a full recount of valid votes. Vitézy supported the measure, while Karácsony dismissed the Court’s rationale as "absurd," alleging it exposed Vitézy’s alignment with Fidesz.

On 7 July, the Curia mandated the recount of all valid votes. The National Electoral Office begun recount on 9 July, at 13:00. At the same time, a new complaint was filed with the Constitutional Court, contending that the Curia itself, rather than the Electoral Office, should oversee the recount.

The recount concluded on 12 July, with Karácsony retaining his victory and increasing his lead to 293 votes. In total, about 1,500 votes changed status, including 507 initially valid votes deemed invalid. Vitézy publicly conceded the election to Karácsony, and no further legal appeals were made. As the deadline for appeals also passed on 12 July, the election results were officially confirmed.

Overview of interim results
Candidate	Party	9 June Initial result		14 June Recount of invalid votes		12 July Recount of valid votes	
Candidate	Party	Votes	%	Votes	%	Votes	%
Gergely Karácsony	Dialogue–DK–MSZP	371,467	47.53	371,578	47.51	371,538	47.53
Dávid Vitézy	VDB–LMP – Hungary's Green Party	371,143	47.49	371,537	47.50	371,245	47.49
András Grundtner	Our Homeland Movement	38,943	4.98	38,995	4.99	38,984	4.99
Total		781,553	100.00	782,110	100.00	781,767	100.00
Valid votes		781,553	96.95	782,110	97.02	781,767	96.96
Invalid/blank votes		24,589	3.05	24,041	2.98	24,548	3.04
Total votes		806,142	100.00	806,151	100.00	806,315	100.00

== See also ==
- 2024 Hungarian local elections
- 2024 Budapest Assembly election
- 2024 European Parliament election in Hungary
