= DK–MSZP–Dialogue Alliance =

Electoral alliance in Hungary

DK, MSZP, Dialogue — The Social Democratic Green Alliance DK, MSZP, Párbeszéd — A szociáldemokrata zöld szövetség
- Chairpersons of parties: Ferenc Gyurcsány (DK); Imre Komjáthi (MSZP); Ágnes Kunhalmi (MSZP); Richárd Barabás (P); Rebeka Szabó (P)
- Founded: 28 March 2024
- Dissolved: 19 October 2024
- Preceded by: United for Hungary
- Ideology: Social liberalism Social democracy Green liberalism Green politics Pro-Europeanism
- Political position: Centre-left
- Colors: Blue; Red; Green

The DK–MSZP–Dialogue Alliance (Hungarian: DK–MSZP–Párbeszéd pártszövetség, [ˈdeːkaː ˈɛmɛspeː ˈpaːrbɛseːd ˈpɒrtˈsøvɛt͡ʃːeːɡ]), officially DK, MSZP, Dialogue Social Democratic–Green Alliance (Hungarian: DK, MSZP, Párbeszéd szociáldemokrata-zöld szövetség) was a short-lived Hungarian centre-left political alliance consisting of the Democratic Coalition, the Hungarian Socialist Party and the Dialogue – The Greens' Party in 2024, in response to the centre-right political power of Péter Magyar strengthening. The alliance was dissolved later that year.

== History ==
Péter Magyar announced his intention to found a party on 15 March 2024. A few days later, the not-yet-formed political formation was polled at 15%, so the former opposition coalition's left-wing members, the Democratic Coalition, the Hungarian Socialist Party, and the Dialogue decided to form a long-term political alliance, which was announced by Klára Dobrev, Ágnes Kunhalmi and Gergely Karácsony at the press conference on 28 March 2024. They agreed that the three parties will run on a unified Social Democrat-Green list in the 2024 European Parliament election, 2024 local elections and 2026 parliamentary election.

On 9 June, the alliance finished in 3rd place both in the 2024 European Parliament election and in the 2024 Budapest Assembly election, while Gergely Karácsony was re-elected as Mayor of Budapest. The next day, Klára Dobrev's shadow cabinet was dissolved.

Despite announcing the alliance would continue into the next parliamentary election, DK leader Ferenc Gyurcsány and MSZP leader Imre Komjáthi both declared on 19 October 2024 that their parties would run candidates on their own in 2026, which effectively ended the alliance.

== Composition ==
Party	Abbr.	Main ideology	Leader(s)
Democratic Coalition	DK	Social democracy	Ferenc Gyurcsány
Hungarian Socialist Party	MSZP	Social democracy	Imre Komjáthi; Ágnes Kunhalmi
Dialogue – The Greens' Party	Párbeszéd	Green politics Green liberalism	Richárd Barabás; Rebeka Szabó

== Election results ==
=== European Parliament ===
Election	List leader	Votes	%	Seats	+/−	EP Group
2024	Klára Dobrev	367,162	8.03 (#3)	2 / 21	▼3	S&D

== See also ==
- 2024 European Parliament election in Hungary
- 2024 Hungarian local elections
- Unity (2014)
- United for Hungary (2020-2022)
