= Áron Porcher =

Hungarian politician

Member of the National Assembly
- Assuming office 9 May 2026
- Succeeding: Ágnes Kunhalmi
- Constituency: Budapest 15th

Personal details
- Party: TISZA

Áron Somerville Porcher is a Hungarian politician who was elected member of the National Assembly in 2026. He has been a member of the General Assembly of Budapest since 2024.
