= László Kucsák =

Hungarian politician

Member of the National Assembly
- In office 14 May 2010 – 7 May 2018

Personal details
- Born: 7 January 1964 (age 62) Budapest, Hungary
- Party: Fidesz
- Profession: teacher, politician

László Kucsák (born 7 January 1964) is a Hungarian teacher and politician, member of the National Assembly (MP) for Pestszentlőrinc (Budapest Constituency XXVI then XV) from 2010 to 2018. He is a member of the Fidesz.

He was a member of the Committee on Education, Science and Research between 14 May 2010 and 5 May 2014. He was also a member of the Committee on Health from September 2013 to May 2014. During the 2014 parliamentary election, Kucsák narrowly defeated his opponent, Socialist politician Ágnes Kunhalmi for the seat Pestszentlőrinc. Thereafter, he served as Vice Chairman of the Committee on Culture, and simultaneously a member of the Committee on Legislation from June 2014 to May 2018. He was also a member of the Committee on Welfare from May 2014 to February 2015. He was defeated by Ágnes Kunhalmi in the 2018 parliamentary election.

== Controversy ==
During the campaign period of the 2018 national election, the Pestszentlőrinc local government issued a Christmas calendar by public funds in early December 2017, in which the photo of Kucsák was featured on all pages of the issue, including a crossword, where the solution was the name of the politician.
