= Imre Komjáthi =

Hungarian politician (born 1968)

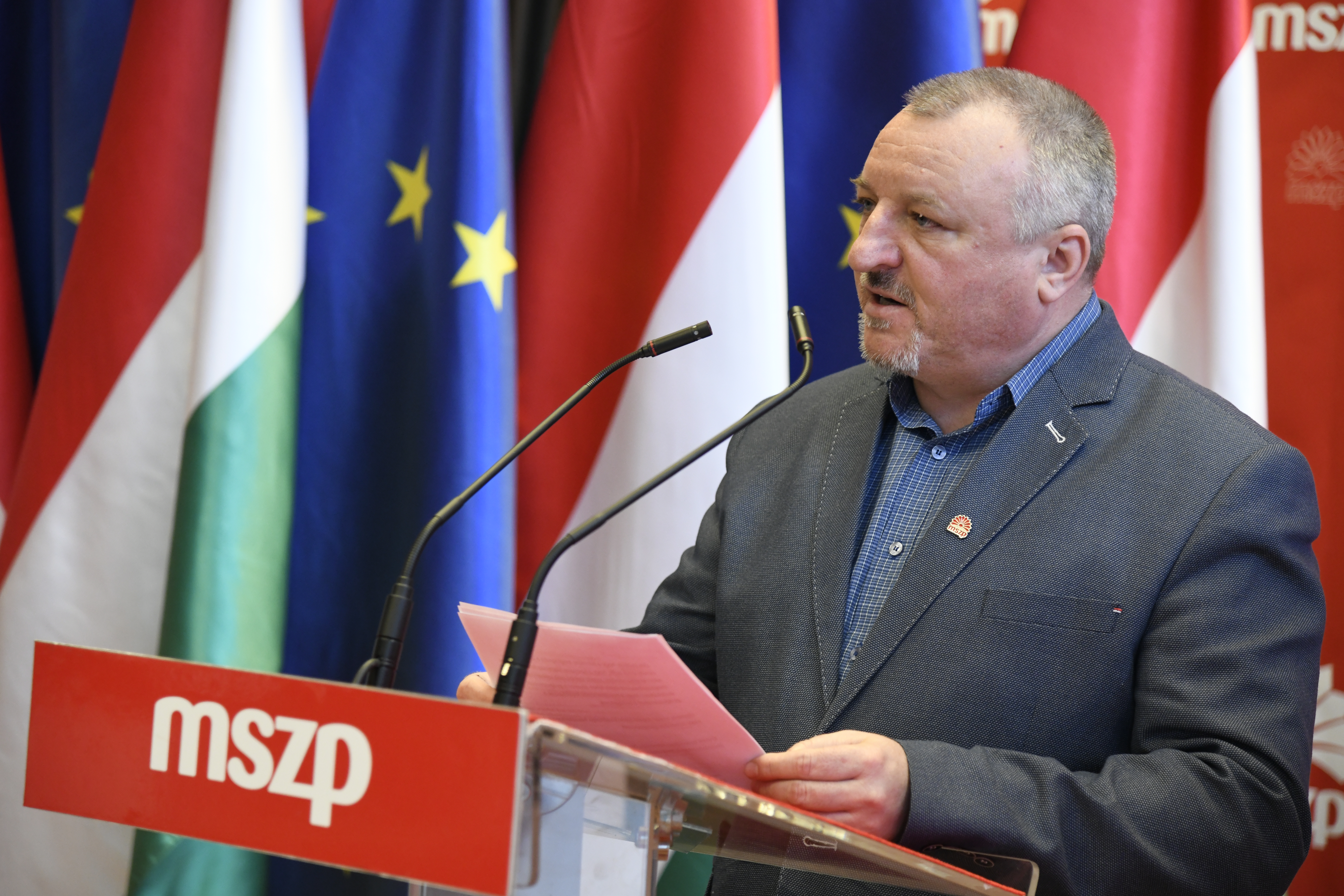
- Komjáthi in 2020

President of the Hungarian Socialist Party
- Incumbent
- Assumed office 19 October 2024
- Preceded by: Position established (Note: Himself and Ágnes Kunhalmi as co-chairs)

Personal details
- Born: 9 March 1968 (age 58)
- Party: Hungarian Socialist Party (since 2006)

Imre Komjáthi (born 9 March 1968) is a Hungarian politician serving as president of the Hungarian Socialist Party since 2024. From 2022 to 2024, he served as co-chair of the party alongside Ágnes Kunhalmi. He has been a member of the National Assembly since 2022.
