= Koloman Brenner =

Hungarian politician

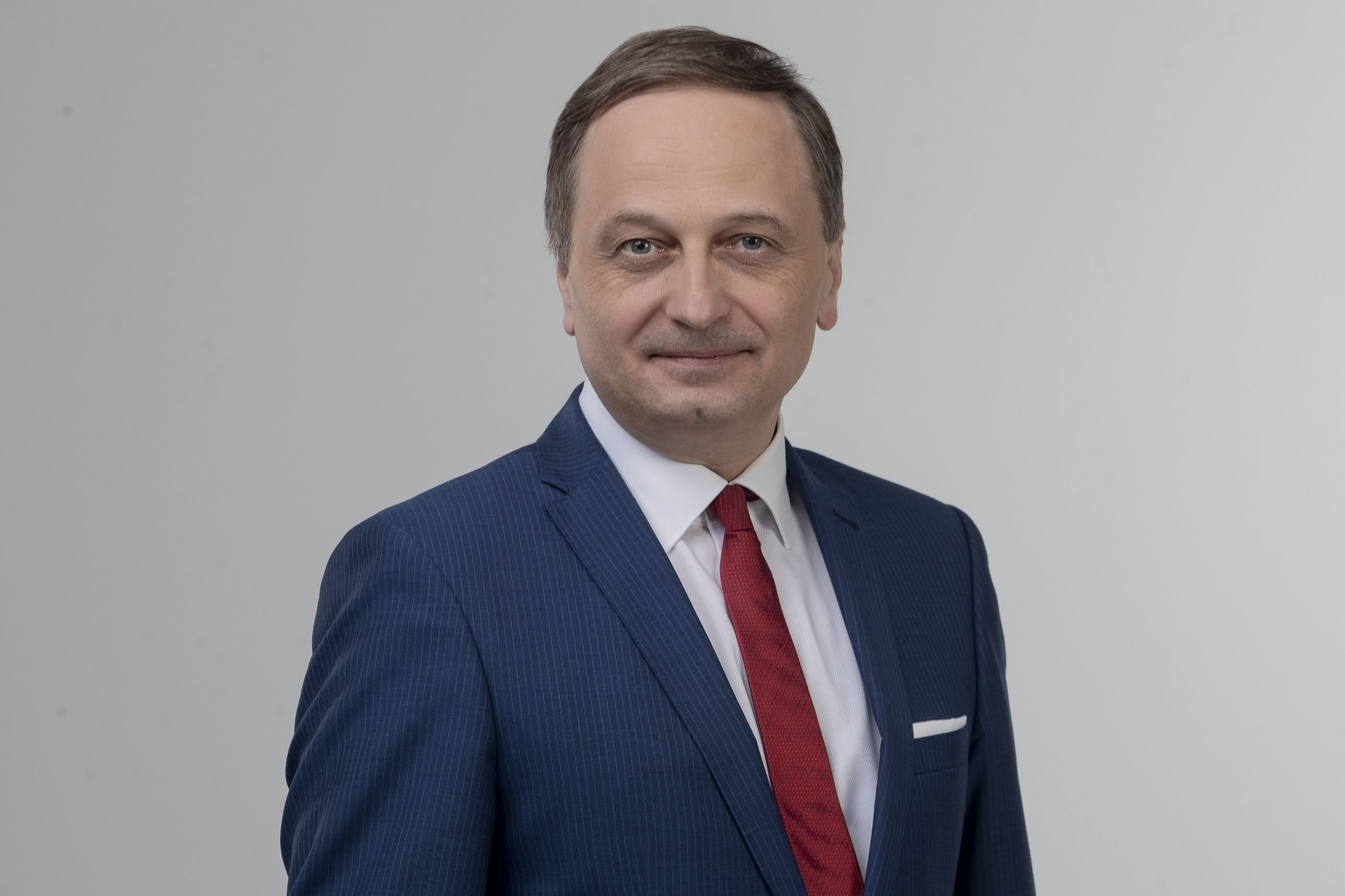
Brenner in 2020

Koloman Brenner (born 28 May 1968) is a Hungarian linguist, politician, and associate professor. He belongs to the ethnic German community of Hungary. Between 2014 and 2017, he was the Deputy Director of the German Institute of the Faculty of Humanities at Eötvös Loránd University. His research fields are the phonetics and phonology of the German language, German and comparative dialectology, minority languages, and multilingualism. He is an active participant in German public life in Hungary. He has been a Member of Parliament since 2018, and he is also a member of the Parliamentary Assembly of the Council of Europe. He served as Deputy Speaker of the Hungarian National Assembly from 2020 to 2022.

== Early life ==
He was born into an ethnic German family in Sopron. He finished his primary and secondary school studies in his hometown. In 1986, he earned his high school diploma from Széchenyi István Grammar School. He began his university studies in 1987 in history and German language at the József Attila University of Szeged, where he graduated as a high school teacher in 1992 and after two years, earned his doctorate.

For three years after his graduation he taught nationality knowledge at Benedek Elek Nursery College of Sopron, between 1995 and 1997 he worked as a teaching assistant at the Dániel Berzsenyi College of Szombathely at the German Language and Literature Department, then as an adjunct. In 1997, he started to teach at the University of Veszprém, where he was a senior adjunct at the Department of German Language and Literature. In 1999, he left Veszprém and started his doctoral studies at the German Doctoral School of Eötvös Loránd University. In addition, he worked at the Faculty of Humanities of the Eötvös Loránd University as an adjunct professor at the German Institute. He was appointed university docent in 2007 and habilitated in 2010. Between 2011 and 2015, he was Deputy Strategic Dean of the Faculty of Arts, and from 2012 to 2016, he was a member of the University Senate. Between 2014 and 2017 he held the position of Deputy Director of Eötvös Loránd University, Faculty of Arts, German Institute. In addition to his work in Hungary, he was a guest lecturer and researcher at a number of German and Austrian universities (Greifswald, Bonn, Vienna, Tübingen, Marburg, Regensburg).

In 2002, he defended his PhD thesis. He became a member of the Linguistics Committee of the Hungarian Academy of Sciences. He is also a member of several scientific associations: Hungarian Germanist Association, International German Dialectological Society (Central German Dialectological Society), Central European German Association (Mitteleuropäischer Germanistenverband), German Central, Eastern, and South-East Europe Central-Research Scientific Adviser, University of Regensburg. He is also a board member of the international editorial board of the online magazine INTRALINEA and a member of the chairman's committee of the publisher of Wiener Sprachblatt. He publishes his scientific publications in Hungarian, German, and English.

== Political career ==
After the end of communism in Hungary, Brenner became an active participant in German national life in Hungary; between 1992 and 1994, he was the head of the Sopron office of the Hungarian Germans' Association. He then became a member of the National Self-Government of Germans in Hungary. From 1996 to 2017, he represented the MNOÖ (the National Self-Government of German in Hungary) in the Federal Union of European Nationalities (FUEN). In 1998, he also became a member of the Association of German Writers and Artists in Hungary (VudAK). In 2015, he also became active in national politics and became an education and foreign affairs expert for the Jobbik, and then in 2017, it was announced that the party would be a Sopron candidate in the 2018 parliamentary elections, which led to his resignation from MNOÖ. He was behind the Fidesz candidate (Attila Barcza) in the election, but won a seat on the national list. In addition, to his foreign affairs committee in Parliament, he will be a member of the national cohesion committee until 2020, and a member of the legislative committee from April 2020. Since the end of 2018, he has held the position of deputy leader of the Parliamentary Group of Jobbik. He is a member of the Parliamentary Assembly of the Council of Europe, where his foreign policy focuses on the protection of national minorities and education policy. Member of the Committee on Culture, Education, and the Media, rapporteur on academic freedom and university autonomy.

After Fidesz tried to hinder his election by not providing a quorum for the parliamentary vote, he was elected for the third run by 109 votes to 1, with 1 abstention.

Brenner was the Jobbik's candidate for Mayor of Budapest in the 2024 mayoral election. He withdrew his candidacy and endorsed independent candidate Dávid Vitézy on 19 April 2024.
