= 2010 Budapest Assembly election =

- 3 Oct 2010

All 33 seats in the General Assembly of Budapest 17 seats needed for a majority
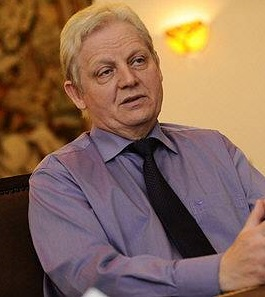

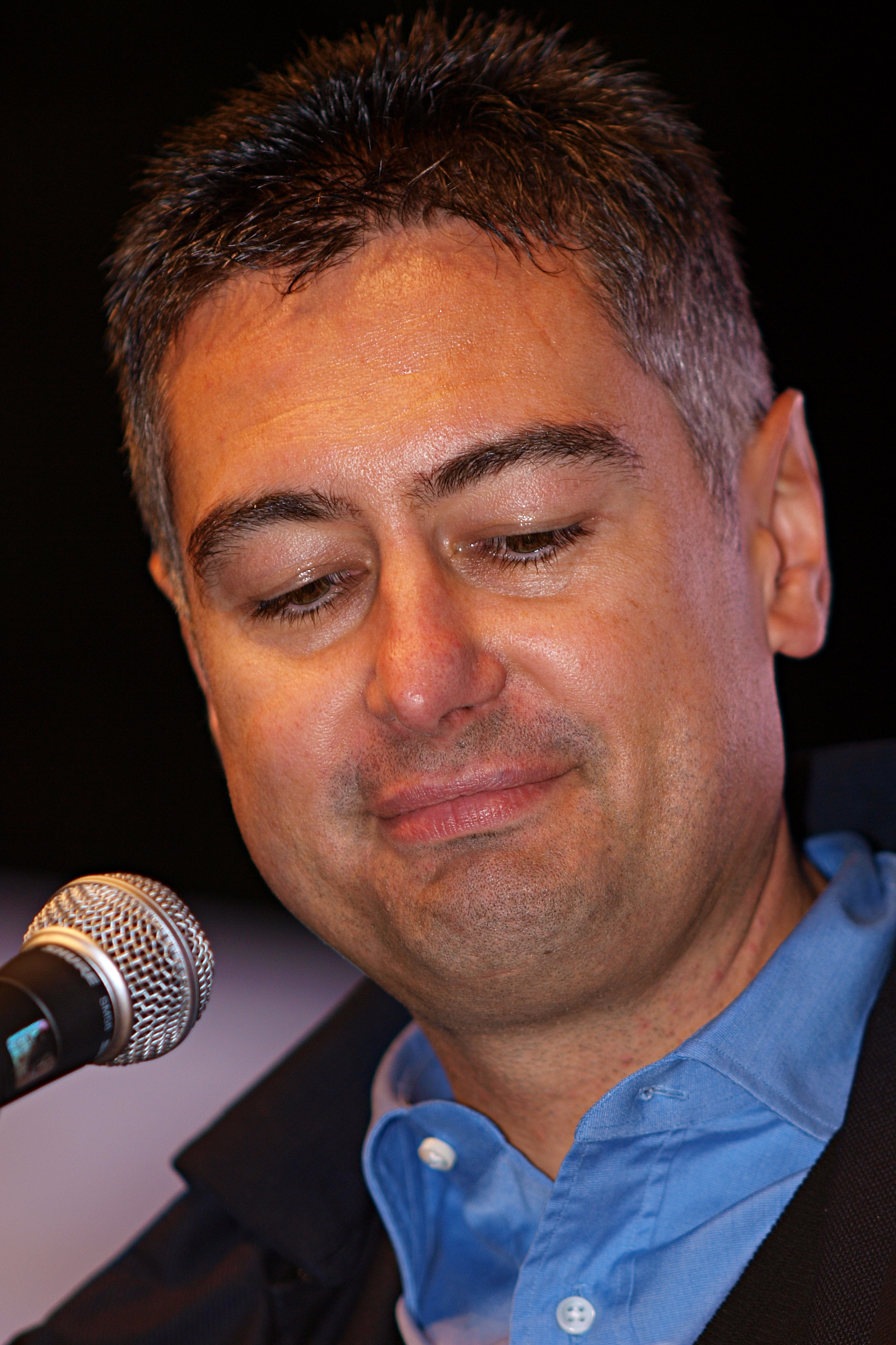

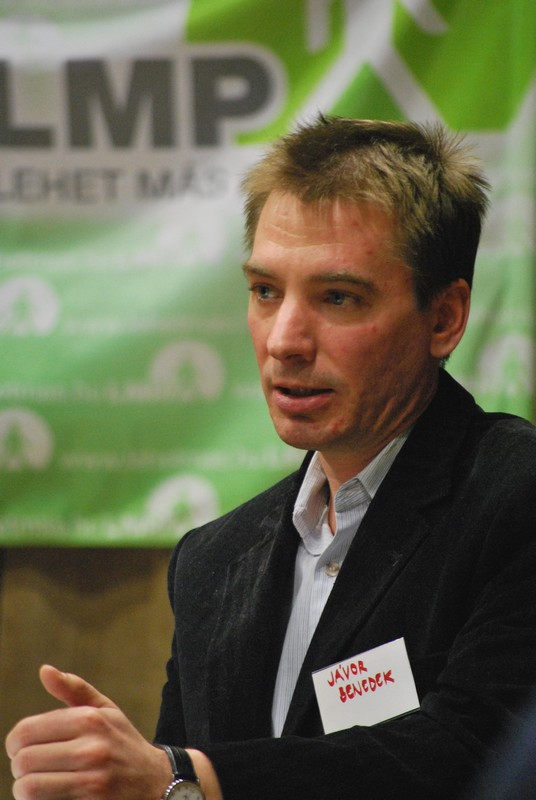

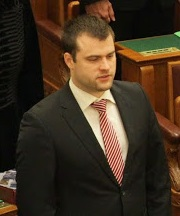
	First party	Second party
Leader	István Tarlós	Csaba Horváth
Party	Fidesz–KDNP	MSZP
Last election	30 seats	24 seats
Seats won	17	10
Seat change	▼13	▼14
Popular vote	302,566	178,507
Percentage	50.18%	29.61%
	Third party	Fourth party
Leader	Benedek Jávor	Gábor Staudt
Party	LMP	Jobbik
Last election	New party	New party
Seats won	3	3
Seat change	▲3	▲3
Popular vote	67,082	54,765
Percentage	11.13%	9.08%

The 2010 Budapest Assembly election was held on 3 October 2010, concurring with other local elections in Hungary. This was the last election for the Assembly with party-list proportional rules until 2024, when this system was restored. The size of the Assembly was reduced from 66 members to 33 at this election.

== Mayor ==
Fidesz–KDNP candidate István Tarlós won the mayoral election with 53.37% of the vote.

== Results ==
List seats were distributed using the D'Hondt method.

Budapest Assembly election, 2010
List	Candidates	Votes	%	±%	Seats	±
Fidesz–KDNP	István Tarlós; Zoltán Pokorni; Imre Pesti; Antal Rogán; István György...	302 566	50.18%	▲7.32%	17	▼13 (Note: Lost seats due to the halving of the size of the assembly)
MSZP	Csaba Horváth; Pál Steiner; Kata Tüttő; Péter Gajda; Ákos Szabados...	178 507	29.61%	▼4.97%	10	▼14
LMP	Benedek Jávor; Jenő Kaltenbach; Ágnes Somfai; Ákos Hanzély; Gergely Simon...	67 082	11.13%	▲11.13%	3	▲3
Jobbik	Gábor Staudt; János Czeglédy; György Szabó; Tibor Pajor; Pál Losonczy...	54 765	9.08%	▲9.08%	3	▲3
