= Volánbusz =

Network of bus operators in Hungary

Volánbusz is a network of transit companies operating intercity, international and city bus lines in Hungary. One Volánbusz company generally served only the area of a specific county. The companies formed from the merger of regional Auto Transit Companies (Hungarian: Autoközlekedési Vállalat; AKÖV) and Cargo Shipping Companies (Hungarian: Teherfuvarozási Vállalat; TEFU).

Children up to the age of 14 and people aged 65 and over can use the Volánbusz buses free of charge.

On end of 2024 the company merged to the MÁV Személyszállítási Zrt. (formerly: MÁV START).

== See also ==
- Budapesti Közlekedési Központ
- BKV Zrt.
