= MOL Bubi =

Bicycle sharing network in Budapest, Hungary

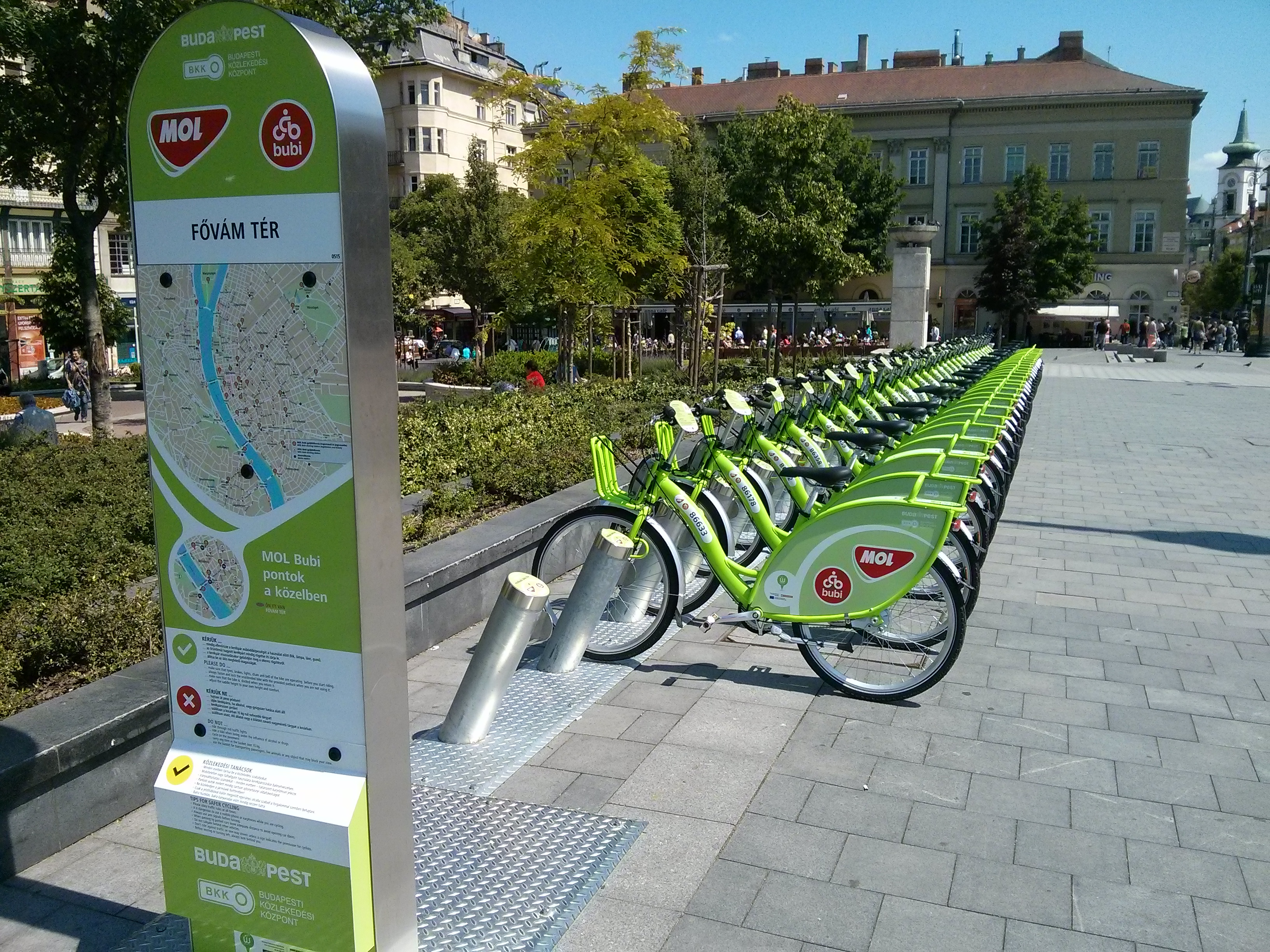

Overview
- Locale: Budapest
- Transit type: Bicycle sharing network
- Number of stations: 208 (April 2024)
- Website: www.molbubi.hu

Operation
- Began operation: September 8, 2014
- Operators: Budapesti Közlekedési Központ, Csepel Zrt.
- Number of vehicles: 2,460 (July 2023)

MOL Bubi (or Bubi for short) is a bicycle sharing network in Budapest, Hungary. Its name is a playful contraction of Budapest and bicikli (bicycle in Hungarian). As of July 2023 the network consists of 211 docking stations and 2,460 bicycles.

== History ==
The Bubi project was established in 2008 by the Municipality of Budapest. The capital investment for this project takes up approx. 900 million HUF (around 3 million €). 85% of this amount is covered by the European Union, and the remaining 15% is paid by the local government. Annual operating costs of est. 250 million HUF (around 800,000 €) are covered by MOL, the largest integrated oil and gas group, and runs a petrol station chain in Hungary – hence the name "MOL Bubi". Unlike basically everywhere else where nextbike's bicycle sharing system is implemented, which includes the hardware and the software and the bicycles, in Budapest it's not operated by nextbike. In Budapest it was operated by T-Systems and Csepel Zrt. Normally, in other implementations of nextbike's bicycle sharing system, the bicycles are assembled in nextbike's own production hall and delivered worldwide, in Budapest, however, the bicycles are produced / assembled by Csepel, a Hungarian bicycle manufacturer. Nevertheless, the bicycles in Budapest are identical to those in Warsaw, as well as to those in several other cities where the bike sharing scheme is created and operated by nextbike.

As of April 2014, the scheme was declared to be a first phase only. It is to be extended if it proves successful. According to János László, President of the Hungarian Cyclists' Club, a network size of 10,000 bicycles would suit the city's needs. In May 2015 the number of bicycles was 1100, and the number of docking stations was 76. In September 2016 the system was extended to 112 stations and 1270 bicycles.

In the summer of 2017 there have been a data breach at T-Systems and large amount of personal data of the Bubi users were leaked. Following the media attention and the controversies BKK decided in 2019 that they will no longer continue their partnership with T-Systems, and from 2020 the operators are BKK and Csepel Zrt.

By December 2018 the number of stations grew to 127 with 1546 bikes and by May 2019 to 143 with 1846 bikes. A few docking stations are sponsored privately by operators of office buildings. In 2023 there were 2,460 bikes and 211 stations. In April, 2024 the Budapest city government and BKK started to plan "Bubi 3.0" to double the number of bikes, include e-bikes and extend the covered area, planned to be finished in 2026.

== Network design ==
The MOL Bubi network consists of 211 docking stations, 2,460 bicycles and 24-hour technical support. The smaller number of docking stations on the Buda side is due to the hills which make cycling harder. The prevailing location of the docking stations can be found on this map.

The network is designed to minimize the risk of having both empty and full docking stations. In order to achieve this, the size of the stations varies with the expected volume. Furthermore, if a bicycle is to be docked in a full station, there are extra stands with non-physical docking capability to which the bicycles can be attached. Each bicycle is equipped with an additional lock which sends an alert to network operators if locked. Then operators can intervene and reallocate bicycles.

Both the size of the area covered and the fare system incentivize short, under-30-minutes runtimes. Therefore, bicycle dockings are expected to be frequent. In order to maintain smooth operation, network logistics is implemented by bicycle-transporting facilities of multiple sizes. The smallest unit can carry two bicycles on a trailer attached to an official bicycle, ensuring quick reallocation of bicycles.

== Equipment ==
=== Dock terminals ===
Bubi users can pay the fares, buy Bubi passes and have deposits returned at the docking stations. The stations are equipped with batteries to supply the terminal and the docks with power, and the terminals are also fitted with solar panels. Each docking station features a surveillance camera to deter theft and vandalism.

=== Bicycles ===
MOL Bubi bicycles are produced by Csepel Zrt.. They are city bikes designed to resist weather and time. In order to prevent theft and vandalism, they are made of irremovable parts which are incompatible with other bicycles.

To satisfy urban cyclists' needs, bicycles are designed to provide their riders with comfort. Each bike is equipped with a front rack with elastic straps for packages, mudguards, chain guards and coat protectors covering the back wheel. Originally they also featured hard wearing puncture-proof tyres, which was one of the most often recited problem, making the bikes bulky and slow; it has been replaced in 2023 by normal tyres, along with making the whole bike 3 kg lighter and upgraded the gear shifting system.

== Fares ==
The fee of using MOL Bubi consists of two distinct parts: the access fee and the usage fee. Planned fares as of April 2025 are summed up in the tables below. Prevailing fares can be found on this webpage.

Access fees
Type	Price
Semi-annual pass	6,500 HUF
Monthly pass	1,500 HUF

Usage fees with a valid monthly or annual pass
Duration	Price
The first 30 minutes of each ride	0 HUF
Rentals exceeding 30 minutes	50 HUF / minute (charged only for time exceeding 30 minutes)

Usage fee without a valid monthly or annual pass
Type	Price
Pay As You Go	50 HUF / minute

== See also ==
- Bicycle sharing system
- BKK
- BKV Zrt.
- Nextbike
- Public transport
- Veturilo — the nextbike system in Warsaw
- List of bicycle sharing systems
