= Alexandra Szentkirályi =

Hungarian lawyer and politician (born 1987)

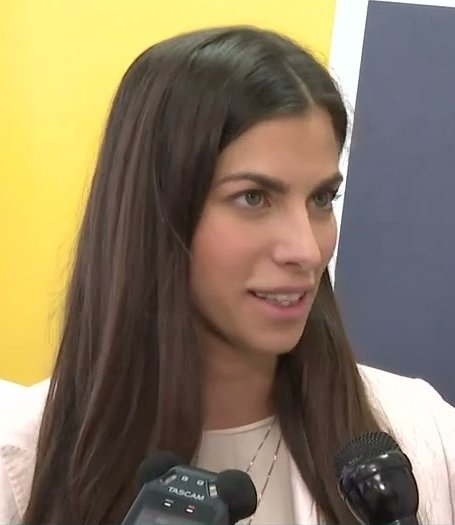
- Szentkirályi in 2022

Member of the National Assembly
- Incumbent
- Assumed office 9 May 2026

Spokesperson of the Government of Hungary
- In office 1 January 2020 – 15 March 2024
- Prime Minister: Viktor Orbán
- Preceded by: István Hollik
- Succeeded by: Eszter Vitályos

Deputy Mayor of Budapest
- In office 7 November 2014 – 13 October 2019

Personal details
- Born: Alexandra Éva Szentkirályi; 11 November 1987 (age 38) Budapest, Hungary
- Party: Fidesz
- Spouse: Kristóf Szalay-Bobrovniczky
- Children: 1
- Education: Pázmány Péter Catholic University (PhD)
- Profession: Politician, lawyer

Alexandra Éva Szentkirályi (born 11 November 1987) is a Hungarian lawyer and politician, a Member of Parliament since 2026. She served as Spokesperson of the fourth and fifth Orbán Government from 1 January 2020 to 15 March 2024. She previously served as Deputy Mayor of Budapest under István Tarlós from 2014 to 2019. She was the Fidesz party candidate for Mayor of Budapest in the 2024 mayoral election, but withdrew her candidacy two days before the election.

== Career ==
Szentkirályi holds a law degree from Pázmány Péter Catholic University. She began her political career at Fidelitas, the youth wing of Fidesz party. Between 2007 and 2010, she was the local leader of Fidelitas in the 1st District of Budapest. From 2009, she worked for Nézőpont Institute, a Fidesz-tied pollster, and at the same time she was the staff member responsible for vendor relations at the Budapest Stock Exchange. In 2011, she became the member of Fidesz–KDNP faction of the General Assembly of Budapest.

From 2012 she was a member of the Board of Directors of the Hungarian Football Federation in Budapest, from 2011 to 2014 she was chairwoman of the supervisory board of BKK Közút Zrt., between 2010 and 2012 she was a member of the supervisory board of Budapest Ornamental and Street Lighting Ltd., and between 2010 and 2012 she was a member of the supervisory board of Fővárosi Közterületfenntartó Zrt.

In 2014, she was involved in István Tarlós's campaign for mayor, and from 7 November to 2019 she became the Deputy Mayor of Budapest, overseeing cultural, education, social and youth policy, sports, environment, tourism and image.

Viktor Orbán has appointed her to succeed István Hollik as spokesperson of the Hungarian government from 1 January 2020.

On 14 March 2024, it was announced that she would be the Fidesz party candidate for Mayor of Budapest in the 2024 mayoral election, against opposition mayor Gergely Karácsony. During her activity, Szentkirályi ran an exclusively defamatory campaign against Karácsony, frequently called him as the "puppet" of former prime minister and opposition leader Ferenc Gyurcsány. Under the slogan "Budapest needs change", she tried to prove Karácsony's incompetence in numerous TikTok videos, but she did not publish her own program or vision. Fidesz leaders, including PM Viktor Orbán remained remarkably passive during her campaign, according to analysts, Fidesz priced the defeat in advance. Szentkirályi refused to attend debates against Karácsony and Vitézy, and, with the exception of pro-government media, she did not give any interviews to the media. Karácsony considered Fidesz "official" candidate Szentkirályi will withdraw in favor of Vitézy sometime during the campaign. Both Vitézy and Szentkirályi refused the allegations throughout the campaign. However, Szentkirályi withdrew her candidacy on 7 June, two days before the election and endorsed Vitézy. Pro-government media unanimously encouraged the election of Vitézy, but the support of the Fidesz–KDNP list in the simultaneous General Assembly election. She was elected a member of the General Assembly, and became leader of the Fidesz caucus there.

Szentkirályi was elected a Member of Parliament via the national list of Fidesz–KDNP during the 2026 Hungarian parliamentary election, where her party fell from power. She was appointed chairperson of the Cultural Committee in May 2026.

== Personal life ==
Her husband is Kristóf Szalay-Bobrovniczky, the former Ambassador of Hungary to the United Kingdom, and former Minister of Defence. They have one child. She can speak English and German fluently.
