= István Hollik =

Hungarian politician

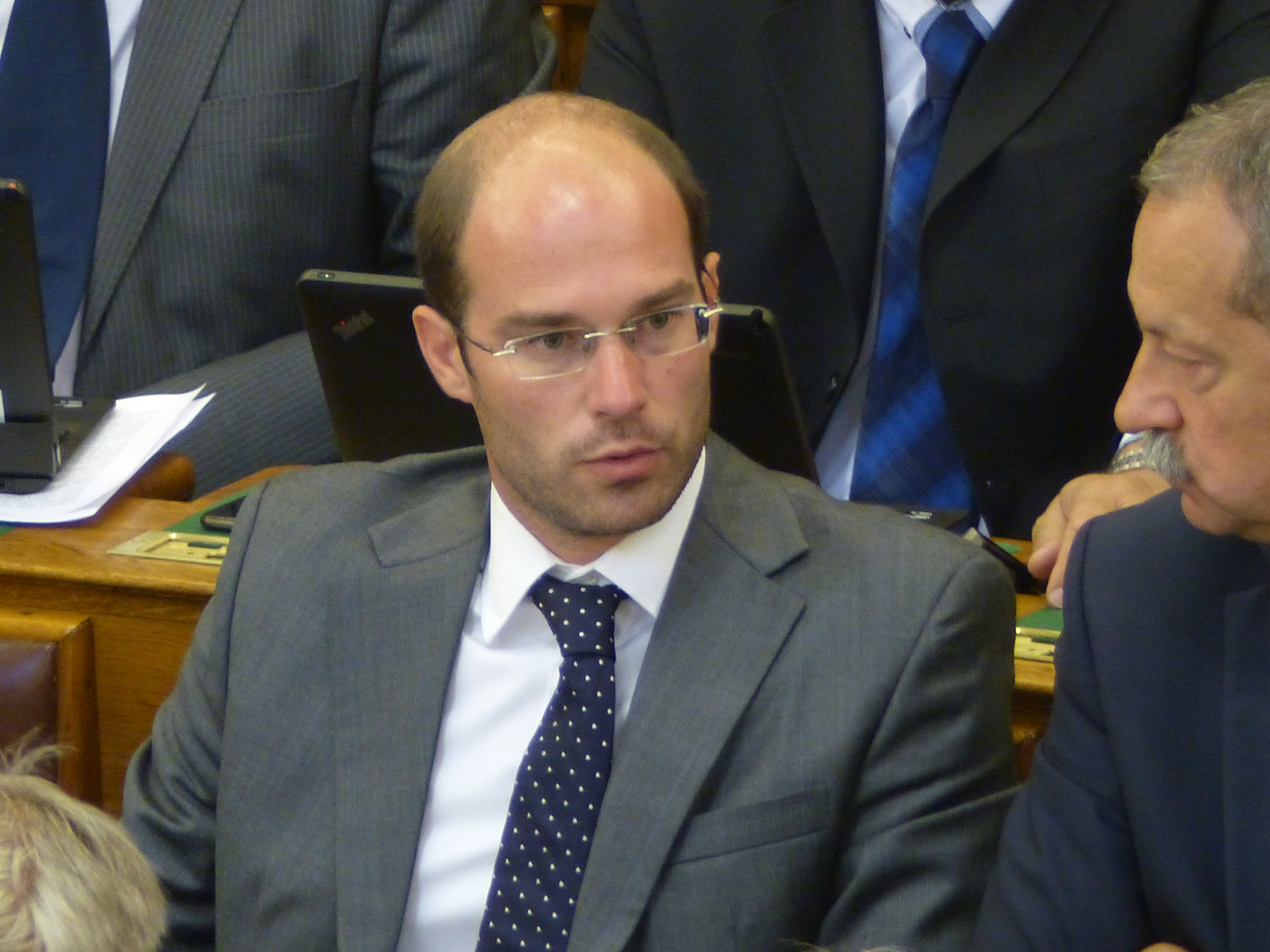
- Hollik in 2016

Member of the National Assembly
- Incumbent
- Assumed office 18 February 2019
- In office 21 September 2015 – 7 May 2018

Deputy Member of the Parliamentary Assembly of the Council of Europe
- In office 27 November 2015 – 31 May 2018

Personal details
- Born: January 23, 1982 (age 44) Budapest, Hungary
- Party: Fidesz

István Hollik (born in Budapest, Hungary on January 23, 1982) is a Hungarian politician. He is a member of National Assembly of Hungary (Országgyűlés) since May 8, 2018. He is a member of Fidesz and has also served as the spokesman for Fidesz since 2020.

== Early life and career ==
István Hollik was born in 1982 in Budapest. While he was a child, he and his family moved to Nagymaros. He graduated from the Piarist High School in Vác and continued his studies at the Faculty of Education of Eötvös Loránd University and the Corvinus University of Budapest - End of the Century Political School. He has been a member of the Youth Christian Democratic Union since 2003. He has been vice-president of the organization since 2005 and president from 2013 to 2015. He joined the KDNP in 2004 and has been a member of Fidesz ever since.

In 2010, he worked in the Cabinet of Ministers of the Ministry of Public Administration and Justice as the editor-in-chief of kormany.hu, a government portal. In 2012, he became the chief political adviser to the Ministry of Human Resources. Until his election as a Member of Parliament in 2015, he served as the Strategic Director of the New Generation Center. He worked as the Spokesman for the Fourth Orbán Government from 2018 to 31 December 2019. In January 2019, he was nominated by Fidesz as a Member of Parliament due to the death of Ferenc Hirt. As of 18 February 2019, he was appointed Government Commissioner for domestic communications.
