= Budapesti Közlekedési Központ =

Public transport company in Budapest, Hungary

Budapesti Közlekedési Központ Zrt.
- Type: Privately held company
- Industry: Public transportation
- Founded: 2011
- Founder: General Assembly of Budapest
- Headquarters: 1075 Budapest, Rumbach Sebestyén u. 19–21.
- Area served: Budapest, neighbouring towns and cities
- Website: https://bkk.hu/en/

The Budapesti Közlekedési Központ (Hungarian: [ˈbudɒpɛʃti ˈkøzlɛkɛdeːʃi ˈkøspont], BKK), officially Budapesti Közlekedési Központ Zrt. (transl. Centre for Budapest Transport), is the largest public transport company in Budapest and one of the largest in Europe. It was founded on 1 January 2011. BKK operates buses (200+ lines, 40 night lines), trams (33 lines), and trolleybuses (15 lines).

== History ==
The last major transport change of Budapest was the foundation of BKV in the 1960s. The foundation of BKK was decided on 27 October 2010 by the General Assembly of Budapest. They appointed Dávid Vitézy as CEO.

From 1 May 2012, BKK began to do many functions of BKV:

- Operating public transportation, planning network, lines and time schedules
- Making public service contracts with BKV and other companies
- Upgrading transportation and planning ideas for upgrading
- Tickets and passes selling and securing

== Transportation ==
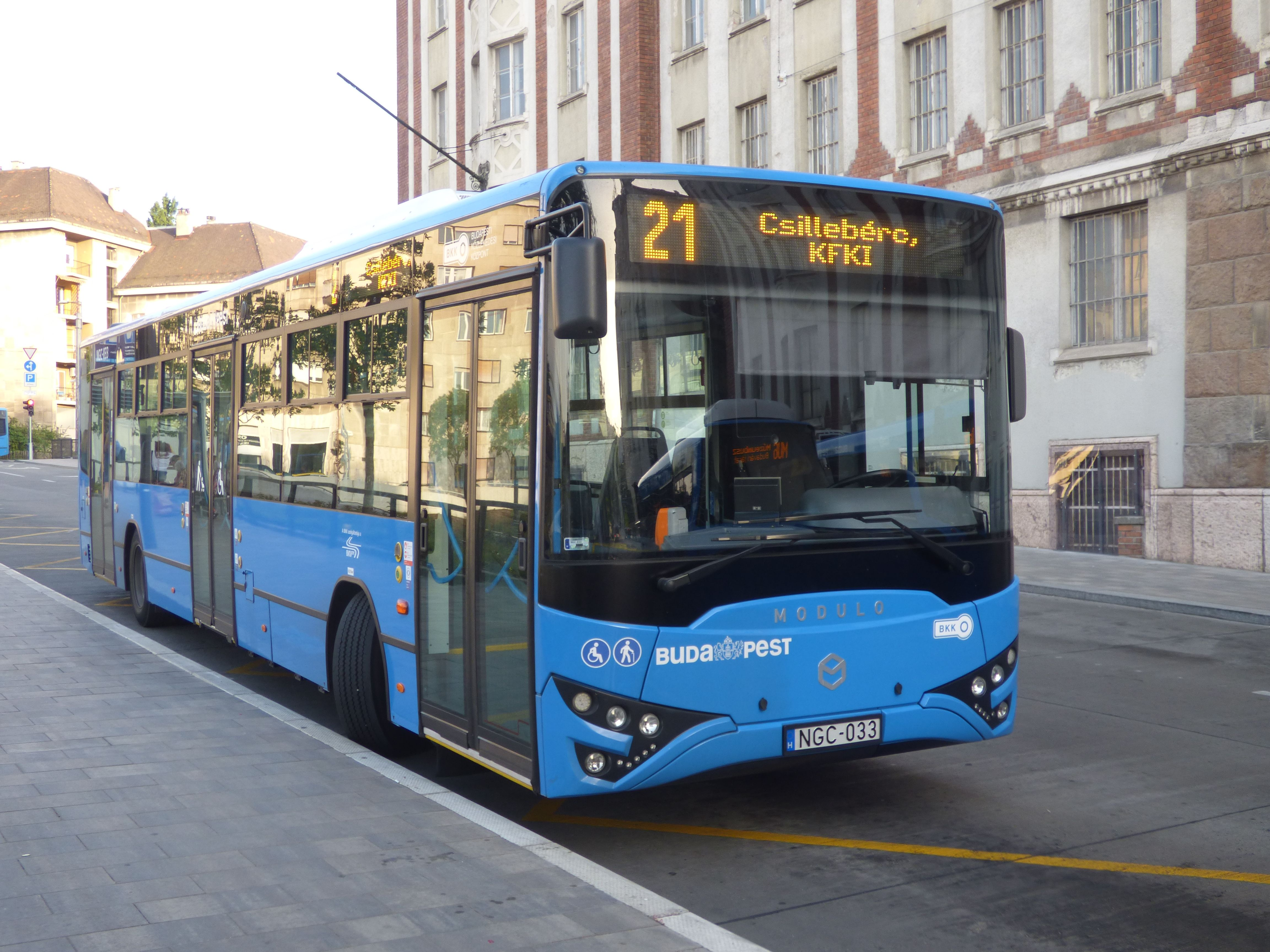
Bus line 21

=== Buses ===
BKK operates over 200 bus lines and 40 night bus lines. The first bus line number is 5. The main bus lines do not have letters in their respective route numbers.

All bus lines operate with low-floor vehicles.
