= Kata Tüttő =

President of the European Committee of the Regions since 2025

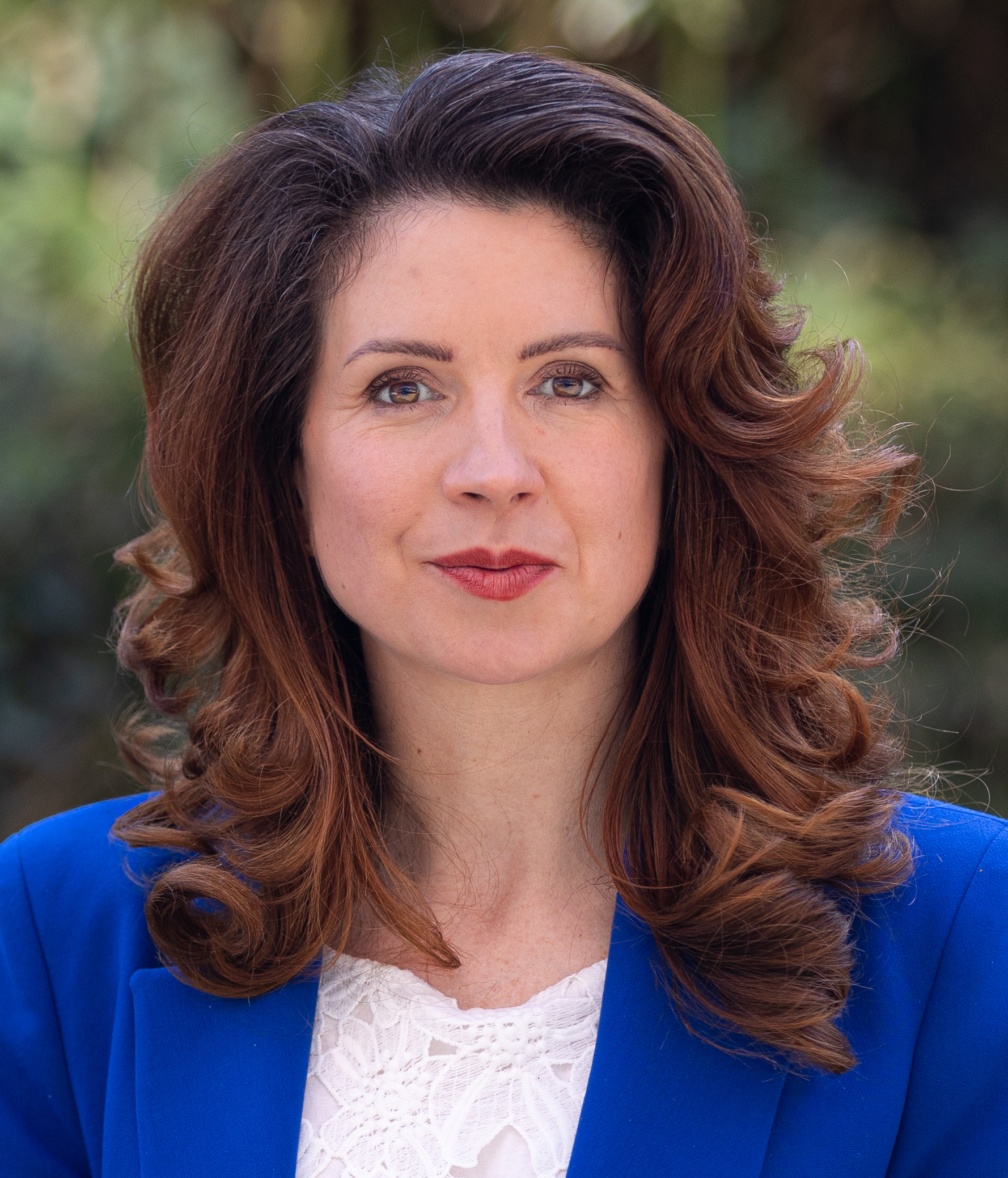
- Tüttő in 2025

President of the European Committee of the Regions
- Incumbent
- Assumed office 19 February 2025
- Vice President: Juanma Moreno
- Preceded by: Vasco Cordeiro

Personal details
- Born: Kata Tüttő; 28 February 1980 (age 46) Budapest, Hungary
- Occupation: Politician
- Profession: Economist

Kata Tüttő (born 28 February 1980) is a Hungarian politician, economist and public servant, President of the European Committee of the Regions since February 2025. Formerly, she has served as Deputy Mayor of Budapest from 2019 to 2024. She now serves as the President of the European Committee of Regions and assumed office in February 2025.

== Education ==
She started school in Charlottesville, Virginia, USA, where her physicist father, István Tüttő, lived due to his work. After moving back to Hungary, she attended Alkotás Street Elementary School, and then from 1994 to 1998, she was a student at Tamási Áron Elementary School and High School in Budapest. She joined the Socialist Party of Hungary before graduating.

Between 1998 and 2003, she obtained a degree in economics from the Faculty of Finance and Accounting of the Budapest Business School, majoring in finance and financial institutions. In 2005, she obtained a degree in international relations from the Zsigmond Király College, majoring in European studies.

Between 2005 and 2010, she studied at the Corvinus University of Budapest, majoring in market analysis, minoring in health economics and technology analysis, where she obtained a degree in economics.

== Political career ==
She joined the Hungarian Socialist Party, MSZP in 1997. In 1998, she became a member of the Youth, Culture and Sports Committee of the 12th District Municipality of Budapest. Since 1998, she has been a member of the MSZP 12th District Committee, and from 2000, member of the party's economic branch. In 2001, she became a member of the Budapest Council of the MSZP. Between 2002 and 2014, she was a representative of the capital's general assembly.

In 2019 she ran for Budapest Mayor as a part of a coalition, but Mayor Péter Szentgyörgyvölgyi remained the mayor of the district. On 5 November 2019, the Metropolitan Assembly elected her Deputy Mayor, responsible for city management. As Deputy mayor she worked in fields like climate adaptation, waste and water management, public transport, and utility services. Currently, she chairs the supervisory board of the Budapest Waterworks Company and the Budapest Sewage Works Company that are 100% public owned companies.

In 2022 she started representing the MSZP as part of the PES Presidency and has been as a board member of the Progressive Alliance, being also vice-chair of the Party of European Socialists group in the European Committee of the Regions. In 2023, Forbes named her the 9th most influential Hungarian woman in public life.

On February 19, 2025, in Brussels, she was appointed the President of the Committee of the Regions, replacing Vasco Cordeiro. She is the first Hungarian person to head an EU institution.

She is a mother of two children.
