= Ágnes Kunhalmi =

Hungarian politician

Ágnes Kunhalmi MP
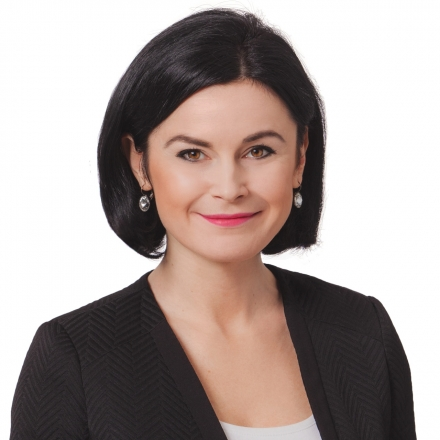

Member of the National Assembly
- In office 6 May 2014 – 8 May 2026
- Constituency: Budapest 15
- Majority: 3,965 (6,6%)

Female co-chair of the Hungarian Socialist Party
- In office 19 September 2020 – 19 October 2024

Personal details
- Born: 31 October 1982 (age 43) Kiskunmajsa, Hungary
- Party: Hungarian Socialist Party

Ágnes Kunhalmi (born 31 October 1982) is a Hungarian socialist politician. She was a Member of the National Assembly, and a Member of the executive board of the Hungarian Socialist Party. She was the Female co-chair of the Hungarian Socialist Party, between 19 September 2020 and 19 October 2024.
