= József Márkus =

Hungarian politician (1852–1915)

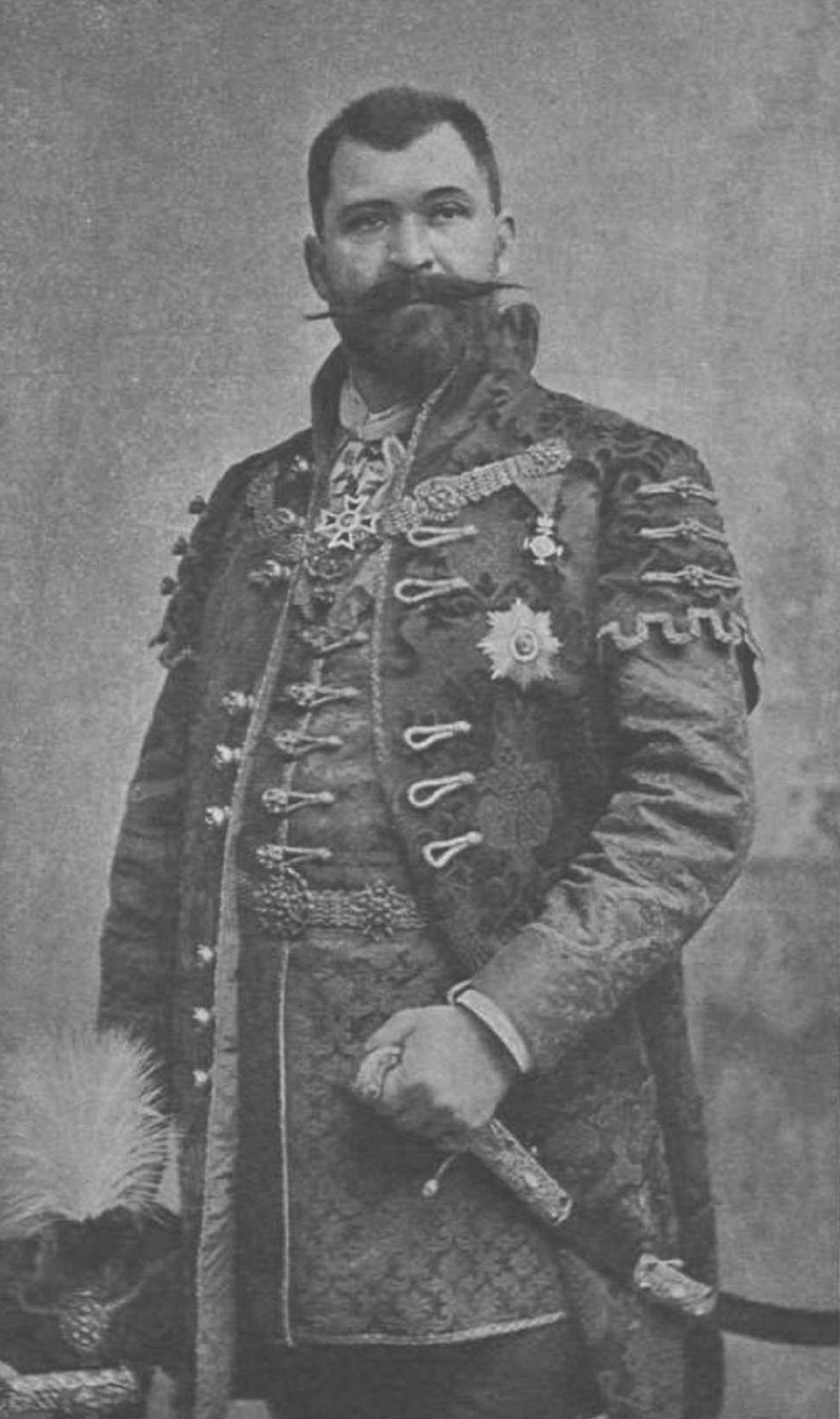
- József Márkus in 1897

Lord Mayor of Budapest
- In office 25 October 1897 – 17 February 1906
- Preceded by: Károly Ráth
- Succeeded by: Kálmán Fülepp

Mayor of Budapest
- In office 25 November 1896 – 25 October 1897
- Preceded by: Károly Kamermayer
- Succeeded by: János Halmos

Personal details
- Born: 16 August 1852 Szombathely, Hungary
- Died: 11 March 1915 (aged 62) Budapest, Austria-Hungary
- Party: National Constitution Party (1906–10); National Party of Work (1910–15)
- Spouse: Janka Feigler
- Children: Jenő; Lily
- Profession: Journalist; politician

József Márkus (16 August 1852 – 11 March 1915) was a Hungarian journalist and councillor, who served as Mayor (1896–1897), then Lord Mayor of Budapest (1897–1906). He was also a Member of Parliament from 1910 until his death.

== Early life ==
He was born into a Transdanubian bourgeois family in Szombathely on 16 August 1852, as the third child of József Márkus Sr. (1822–1873), who worked as a miller at the local gristmill, owned by Prince Fülöp Batthyány. His mother was Anna Rozália Horvát (1823–1916), a sister of jurist and politician Boldizsár Horvát, who served as Minister of Justice between 1867 and 1871, in the cabinet of Count Gyula Andrássy. His parents married on 25 November 1846 in Szombathely. József Márkus had six siblings, including politician István Márkus (1847–1880), poet Miklós Márkus (1849–1882) and actress Emília Márkus (1860–1949). When the mill burned down after an accident, the extended family moved to Boldizsár Horvát. After the early death of their father in 1873, the smaller Márkus children were raised by Horvát in Budapest, who retired from politics by then.

József Márkus finished his elementary and secondary studies in his birthplace. He attended the Faculty of Law of the University of Pest (today Eötvös Loránd University, ELTE). After graduation, he got a job in the Ministry of Justice, when his uncle still held the position of minister. Decades later Ferenc Harrer pointedly noted in his memoir (Egy magyar polgár élete, "The Life of a Hungarian Bourgeois") that Márkus could thank his professional career merely because of his family relationships. He added that Márkus "was lack of knowledge and diligence". In contrast, other contemporaries argued that Márkus had "classical education, brilliant oratorical skills and extraordinary working capacity".

Márkus married to a Hungarian noblewoman Janka Feigler (1858–1931) in 1877. They had two children, author and civil servant Jenő (born 1879) and pianist Lily (born 1888) who was the wife of painter and graphic Lajos Sz. Gyenes (1890–1971).

== Early career ==
Márkus soon continued his career as a journalist. He was an author of the progressive Reform daily newspaper, before joining as a columnist responsible for Budapest affairs to the Nemzeti Hírlap, edited by István Toldy, in 1873. In that capacity, Márkus began increasingly interested in politics and administration of Budapest. Due to the encouragement of his uncle, he took a draftsman traineeship at the Budapest City Hall in 1875. After a few months, he was appointed assistant clerk by Mayor Károly Kamermayer in 1876, thus Márkus became a direct employee to the mayor. In 1879, he was appointed notary at the city council's meetings. He played a major role in the establishment of the Elevator House and several other warehouses in the early 1880s, as a result he was awarded the Crowned Gold Cross of Merit by King Francis Joseph in 1884. Following this success, he was promoted to Chief Notary of Budapest on 1 April 1885. He was elected a councillor to the Municipal Local Board of the General Assembly of Budapest five years later, on 1 April 1890, he was the youngest person who held the dignity during that time. In that capacity, he chaired the Finance and Economy Department.

Following the death of the incumbent office-holder Gusztáv Alkér, Márkus was elected Second Deputy Mayor by the General Assembly on 21 February 1894. As the youngest councillor, he gained 231 of the 279 votes. Mayor Kamermayer cited Márkus' "irreproachable character, unparalleled intellectual ability and professionalism [...]" when his protegee took the office. Shortly thereafter Márkus led a 25-member delegation to Turin, where freedom fighter and statesman Lajos Kossuth died after spending his last years in exile on 20 March 1894. Márkus personally arranged for the repatriation of his corpse. Amid a sensitive political climate, Kossuth was buried in the Kerepesi Cemetery following a huge and ceremonious funeral procession on 1 April 1894. Having regard to the monarch Francis Joseph and the Austrian counterpart, the Hungarian cabinet did not represent officially itself at the event. On behalf of the city administration, Márkus actively involved in the organization of the funeral. Kamermayer also had to stay away from the ceremony, thus Budapest was represented by First Deputy Mayor Károly Gerlóczy at the highest level, who gave a speech too.

Márkus took part in the establishment of a new administrative structure in Budapest, which increased the importance of district offices (called prefectures during that time). Formerly, he was a co-author, alongside Kamermayer, of a draft ("Memoir concerning the market halls"), which described the plan of development of a network of market halls in the 1890s. The most impressive piece of this project was the Great Market Hall, which was completed in 1897, when Márkus already occupied the mayoral seat. In May 1895, along with Jenő Rákosi and Count József Majláth, he was a founding member of the National Association (Hungarian: Országos Nemzeti Szövetség), which set the objective of improve social conditions for workers, and ethnic reconciliation to counteract socialist and nationalist conflicts and protests countrywide. Márkus' political influence gradually increased in parallel with Kamermayer's deteriorating health condition. Throughout the 1896 millennium celebrations, lasted from 2 May to 31 October, which commemorated the anniversary of the Hungarian conquest of the Carpathian Basin, Márkus personally managed the program of events on behalf of the city administration and maintained contact with the Bánffy government. In many banquets and ceremonies, he represented Budapest. His activity was acknowledged by Francis Joseph, who awarded a title of royal counselor to Márkus after the events.

== Mayor of Budapest ==
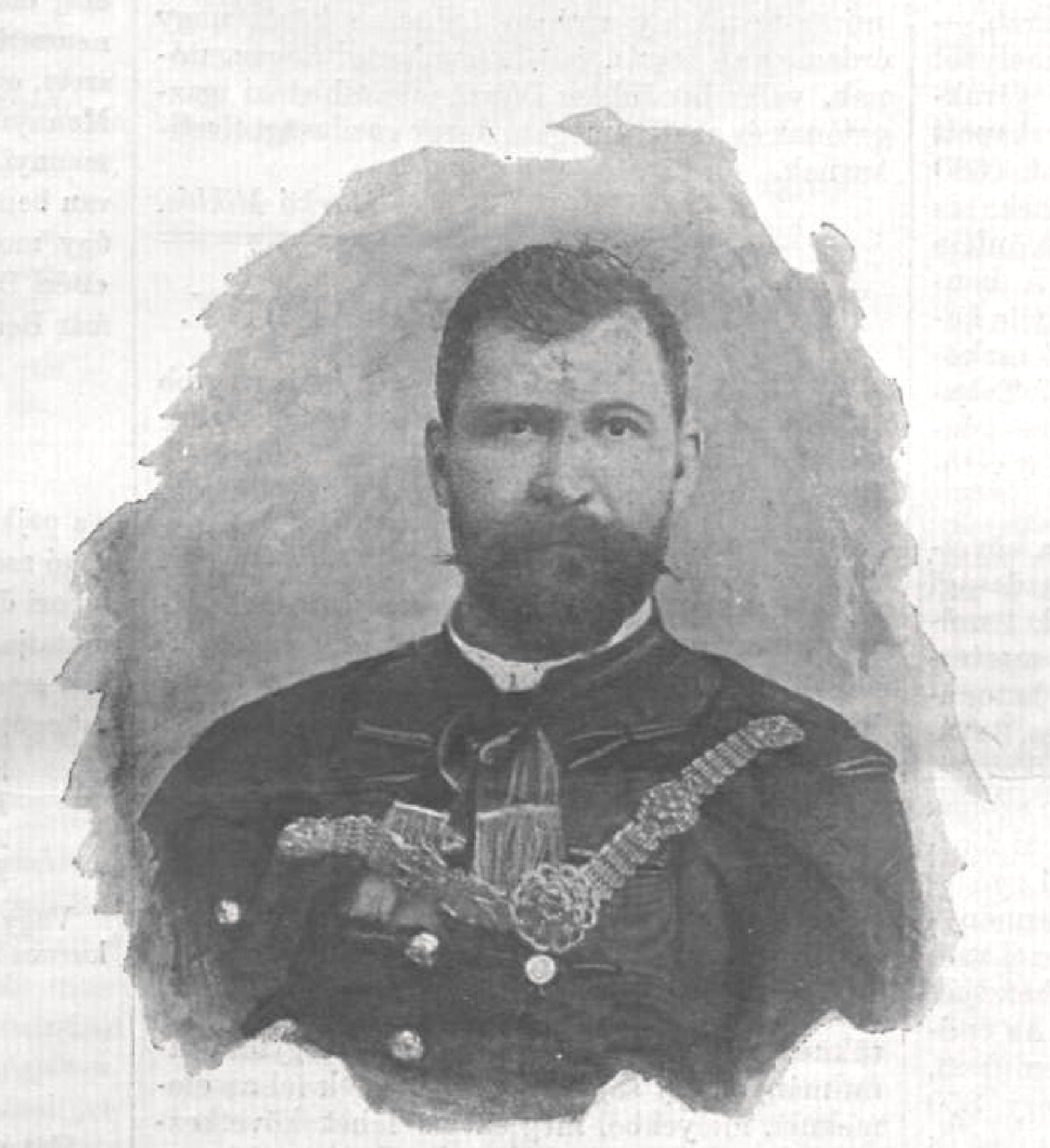
József Márkus in 1896

In October 1896, Kamermayer announced his retirement and resigned from his position of mayor after 23-year term. He considered the relatively young Márkus as his trusted successor, despite the fact that Gerlóczy held the office of First Deputy Mayor since the unification of the city in 1873. According to the first mayor's will, Márkus was elected by the General Assembly as the next Mayor of Budapest, receiving 244 votes, while his opponent, the elderly Gerlóczy gained only 110 votes. The election of Márkus as Mayor marked a generational change within the city administration (Gerlóczy retired from politics at the end of 1897). Ferenc Harrer argued that Márkus became favorite of the urban population owing to his "bohemian nature, powerful presence, but especially singing talent." Harrer, who was critical against the city administration, added that Márkus' "adaptability guided among an emerging political class, which bursted into the place of the dying patriarchy, and they considered [Márkus] as perfect executive of their plans and aspirations".

Márkus took his office on 25 November 1896. After taking the oath, he gave an inaugural speech, where he promised that the city administration will be respect the government's supervision and inspection rights, however he personally will prevent any effort to unauthorized influence and intentions, which fell outside the scope of the municipality law, and, especially, which sought to diminish the city's autonomy. In his speech, Márkus emphasized the need for reform of administrative structure, and also promised the establishment of new departments. During that time, a lot of administrative scope concentrated in the hands of the Mayor of Budapest (for instance, even civil registration of births) which provided a "water-headed" characteristics to the city administration. As a result, Márkus was determined to adopt decentralization laws. At the time of his 11-month term as Mayor of Budapest, Márkus began intensively to reorganize the office of city prosecution, the engineering office and the district agencies. However his proposals were discussed by the General Assembly only in 1899 due intentions from the Ministry of Interior. However Márkus could manage to implement some corrections: few minor administrative cases (e.g. tax collection) were assigned to the lower-ranking committees and councils of the districts. He established the separate Transport Department too.

== Lord Mayor of Budapest ==
After spending 23 1/2 years in office, Lord Mayor Károly Ráth died on 30 July 1897. The position remained vacant for several months due to an intense election struggle. According to the city unification law (Statute XXXVI of 1872), the General Assembly had to elect the next Lord Mayor among the three candidates nominated by countersignature of Francis Joseph after consultations with the Ministry of Interior. Márkus was elected as Lord Mayor on 25 October 1897 with 311 of 339 votes. His two opponents, János Ludvigh, President of the Administrative Court and Péter Ráth, Director of Kassa-Oderbergi Railway received just 28 votes jointly. Harrer published an urban legend in his memoir which suggested that Márkus was actually nominated by Wilhelm II, German Emperor to the position, when visited the millennium celebrations in 1896. As Lord Mayor, Márkus represented his predecessor's role perception, maintaining a broker relationship between the national government and the city administration. Enjoying the confidence of both sides, his election also demonstrated the basically good relations between the two sides then. In comparison to Ráth, Márkus tried to enforce the office's audit function by adopting a more ambitious approach, but that did not lead to conflict regarding Budapest's autonomy.

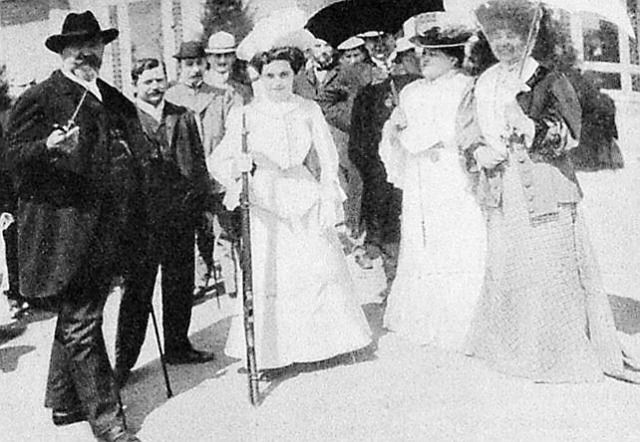
József Márkus (left) with sport shooter Sári Somló and his sister, actress Emília Márkus during an international shooting competition in Pestszentlőrinc in May 1905

According to the contemporary press, the general public in Budapest considered Márkus' election as waste of an agile and energetic career, since the position of Lord Mayor was associated with limitied and more passive powers. Márkus put the emphasis on the balance of interests and rarely came into conflict with the national cabinet. A journalist of the Pesti Hírlap argued that the Lord Mayor showed his forceful behavior only against employees, which vanished during negotiations with equal partners. Nevertheless, Márkus had social prestige in the Hungarian public life. Francis Joseph granted him lifetime membership in the House of Magnates on 21 April 1898. Márkus was also awarded Knight Cross of the Imperial Austrian Order of Leopold on 20 November 1898. He was a member of the Memorial Committee for Empress Elisabeth of Austria, who was assassinated on 10 September 1898. He also received 2nd Class of the Order of the Crown (Prussia), Knight Cross of the Order of the Crown (Romania) and the 2nd Class of the Order of Saint Stanislaus of the Russian Empire. As a member of the House of Magnates, Márkus was active in the legislative and evaluation committees. He participated in the work of several social organizations; he served as a member of the Directorate of the Railway Society of Budapest and functioned as Chairperson of the Home of Private Officials. In 1900, he organized among the members of the General Assembly a fundraising for the deceased civil servants' widows and orphans, called Márkus Fund after him.

On 28 October 1903, Márkus was re-elected as Lord Mayor of Budapest. By then the previous balanced relationship disintegrated between the Hungarian government and the city administration, in addition to economic downturn. Following the 1905 parliamentary election, a major constitutional crisis broke out when Francis Joseph appointed Géza Fejérváry as Prime Minister, ignoring the election results which saw a massive victory of the opposition Party of Independence and '48. Along with others, the Budapest administration declared that the Fejérváry ministry was unconstitutional, and participated in the passive resistance against it. Accordingly, the General Assembly decided not to provide the collected taxes to the central budget, and also authorized Mayor János Halmos to deny to execute the government decrees. Márkus and his narrow circle disagreed with the resistance, thereafter the Minister of Interior József Kristóffy declared void the General Assembly's decision.

Lord Mayor Márkus became an unpopular figure within the city administration. He was unable to mediate between the two parties, as a result he submitted his resignation on 17 February 1906, along with Mayor János Halmos. On behalf of the General Assembly, he was farewelled by Géza Polónyi (a member of the Second Wekerle cabinet one month later), who said Márkus "remained a constitutionalist and patriot even in difficult times, who chose the respect for constitution against the high and dignified office in a risky situation." After his resignation, Márkus was granted Commander with Star of the Order of Franz Joseph by the eponymous monarch.

== Member of Parliament ==
Márkus first appeared as an ordinary councillor in the General Assembly on 24 February 1906. When Francis Joseph intended to appoint a royal commissioner (Budapest Police Chief Béla Rudnay) to lead the resistant city administration, Márkus argued that the monarch should also respect the Hungarian laws and constitutionalism. He proposed that the General Assembly should declare the appointment of Rudnay as unconstitutional and invalid. His proposal was accepted by the administrative body without changes.

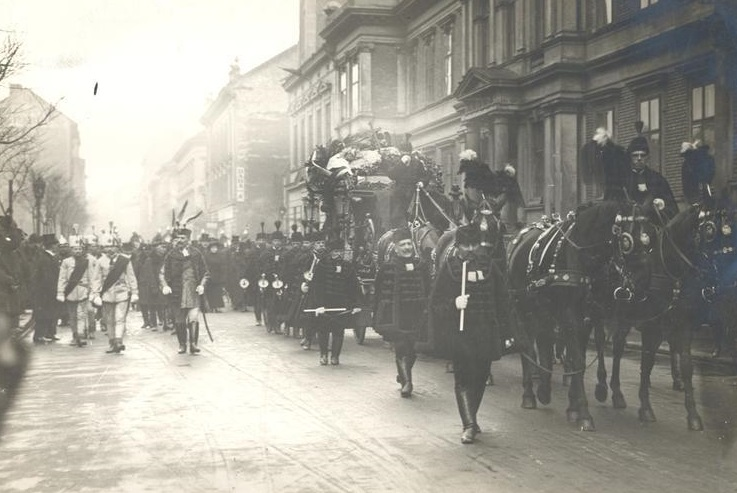
Márkus' funeral in March 1915

After his resignation, Márkus did not retire, but entered politics at national level. He ran as a candidate of the National Constitution Party to represent Erzsébetváros (today 7th district of Budapest) in the 1906 parliamentary election, but did not obtain a mandate, defeated by Béla Barabás, an influential member of the Party of Independence and '48. Nevertheless, Márkus was elected Member of Parliament for Erzsébetváros four years later in the 1910 parliamentary election, defeating incumbent MP Károly Eötvös and industrialist Mór Lányi. Márkus joined the National Party of Work parliamentary group. He was appointed a member of the Committee of Public Administration and the Financial Committee at the inaugural session of the House of Representatives.

József Márkus made his last public appearance on 17 November 1913. He died on 11 March 1915 after a lengthy illness at the Pajor Sanatorium in Budapest. His coffin was laid in repose in the St. Elizabeth Church of Erzsébetváros, before being transferred by a solemn funeral procession to the Kerepesi Cemetery. He was farewelled by then-mayor István Bárczy during the event. He said Márkus' "operation was permeated by a Hungarian democratic patriotic sentiment, a humanist liberal thought, and a versatile knowledge, which covered every field of urban management [...]".

== Sources ==
- Sipos, András (2008). ""Dualizmus" a főváros élén. A főpolgármesteri és a polgármesteri intézmény, 1873–1950". In Feitl, István (ed.). A főváros élén. Budapest főpolgármesterei és polgármesterei, 1873–1950 [=At the Helm of the Capital: Lord Mayors and Mayors of Budapest, 1873–1950] (in Hungarian). Napvilág Kiadó. pp. 11–26. ISBN 978-963-9697-19-5.
- Varsányi, Erika (2008). "Márkus József". In Feitl, István (ed.). A főváros élén. Budapest főpolgármesterei és polgármesterei, 1873–1950 [=At the Helm of the Capital: Lord Mayors and Mayors of Budapest, 1873–1950] (in Hungarian). Napvilág Kiadó. pp. 37–43. ISBN 978-963-9697-19-5.
- Vásárhelyi, Ferenc, ed. (1910). "Márkus József". A magyar országgyűlés. A főrendiház és a képviselőház tagjainak életrajzi adatai [=The National Assembly of Hungary: Biographical Data of Members of the House of Magnates and the House of Representatives] (in Hungarian). Jókai Nyomda. pp. 232–233.
- Vörös, Károly, ed. (1978). Budapest története IV. A márciusi forradalomtól az őszirózsás forradalomig [=History of Budapest IV.: From the March Revolution to the Aster Revolution] (in Hungarian). Akadémiai Kiadó. ISBN 963-05-1083-9.

Political offices
Preceded by Károly Kamermayer	Mayor of Budapest; 1896–1897	Succeeded by János Halmos
Preceded by Károly Ráth	Lord Mayor of Budapest; 1897–1906	Succeeded by Kálmán Fülepp
