= János Halmos =

Hungarian Lawyer and Politician

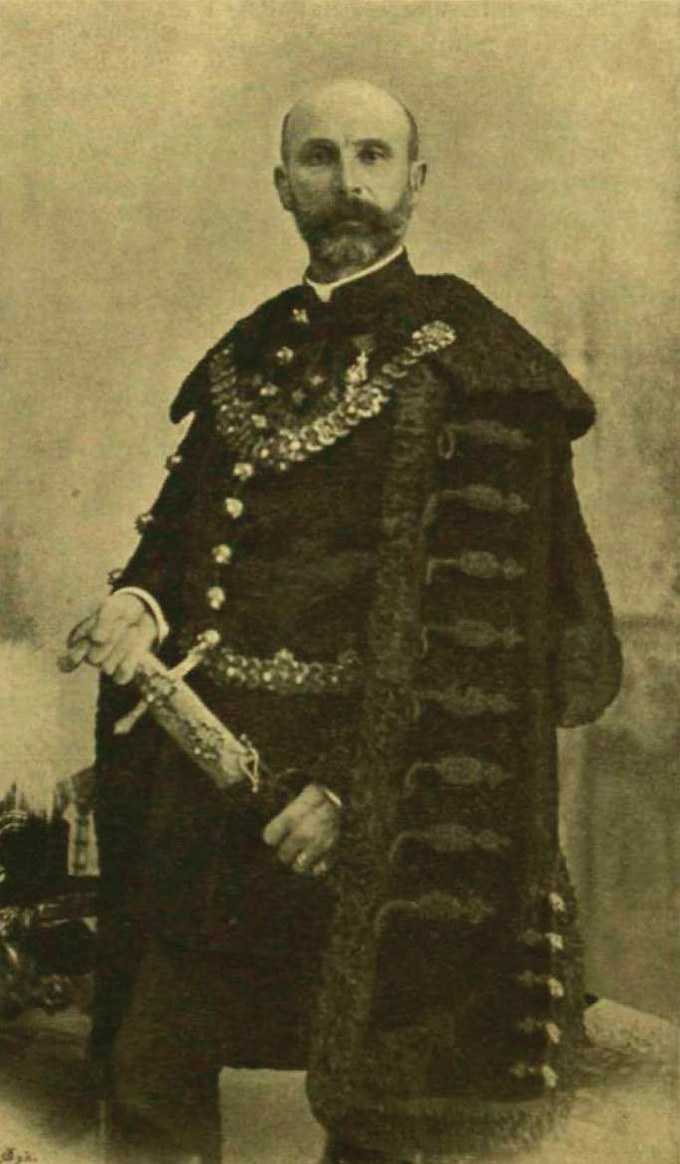

Mayor of Budapest
- In office 8 November 1897 – 17 February 1906
- Preceded by: József Márkus
- Succeeded by: István Bárczy

Personal details
- Born: János Haberhauer; 4 May 1847 Pest, Hungary
- Died: 17 April 1907 (aged 59) Budapest, Austria-Hungary
- Party: Independent
- Profession: lawyer, politician

János Halmos (born János Haberhauer; 4 May 1847 – 17 April 1907) was a Hungarian lawyer and councillor, who served as Mayor of Budapest between 1897 and 1906.

== Early career ==
Halmos was born János Haberhauer on 4 May 1847 into an urban family of German origin in Terézváros, Pest, as the son of wealthy butcher Hubert Haberhauer and Magdolna Schultz. He finished his elementary and secondary studies (Piarist Secondary School) in his birthplace, then studied law at the University of Pest (today Eötvös Loránd University, ELTE). Having passed the bar examination, János Haberhauer qualified to a lawyer and opened his practice in the capital. However soon he joined the city administration, when he was elected notary of Terézváros on 20 November 1873, shortly after the unification of Budapest. He gained 289 of the total of 299 votes during the election process.

In 1882, he was appointed councillor. In that capacity, he chaired the Tax Department. He supported the adoption of a frugal budget in these years, and successfully prevented the nationalization of Budapest's tax management. He also reached that the payment of the Austro-Hungarian Bank' municipal tax occurred into the municipal fund, instead of the fund of the influential Public Works Council. Haberhauer later served as head of the Military Department, then Public Health Department. In the latter position, he played a significant role in the establishment of the Saint Ladislaus Hospital in 1894, which specialized in the treatment of epidemic cases. As head of department, he invented a comprehensive general regulation system for hospitals in Budapest. He signed a contract with entrepreneur Lajos Cséry, who organized regular waste removal throughout the city into the so-called "Cséry estate", a 60 hectares of landfill in Pestszentlőrinc.

As head of the Finance Department, Haberhauer participated in the organization of the 1896 millennium celebrations, which commemorated the anniversary of the Hungarian conquest of the Carpathian Basin. As a result, he was granted Knight Cross of the Order of Franz Joseph by the eponymous monarch on 10 October 1896. After the election of József Márkus as Mayor, Haberhauer was promoted to Second Deputy Mayor on 9 December 1896, obtaining 217 of the 278 votes. Lord Mayor Károly Ráth praised Haberhauer's "excellent administrative skills and other excellent qualities", when took the office.

== Mayor of Budapest ==
Only a year after the start of the new administration, incumbent Mayor József Márkus was elected Lord Mayor in October 1897, replacing Ráth, who died in office months earlier. As sole candidate, Haberhauer was elected unanimously as Mayor of Budapest on 8 November 1897. Meanwhile, Haberhauer has previously initiated voluntarily the Magyarization of his surname of German origin. He received the authorization by the Ministry of Interior to adopt Halmos surname on the day of the election, thus he was elected Mayor by the General Assembly as János Haberhauer, but took the oath as János Halmos a few hours later. In his inaugural speech, Halmos considered the city administrative reform as the highest priority task. Beforehand, a lot of administrative scope concentrated in the hands of the Mayor of Budapest (for instance, even civil registration of births) which provided a "water-headed" characteristics to the city administration. Already Márkus was determined to adopt some kind of decentralization laws. In comparison to the "Golden Age" which characterized the significant part of the long-time mayoral period of Károly Kamermayer, Halmos had to face with economic downturn and deteriorated relationship between the city administration and the national government. As a result, he emphasized a higher degree of enforcement of austerity policy regarding the annual budgets. For the first time since the 1870s, the General Assembly approved frugal and less ambitious budgets in order to increase local government savings. On the occasion of ordinary election of officials, Halmos was re-elected Mayor on 23 December 1897, in charge of the new budget implementation.

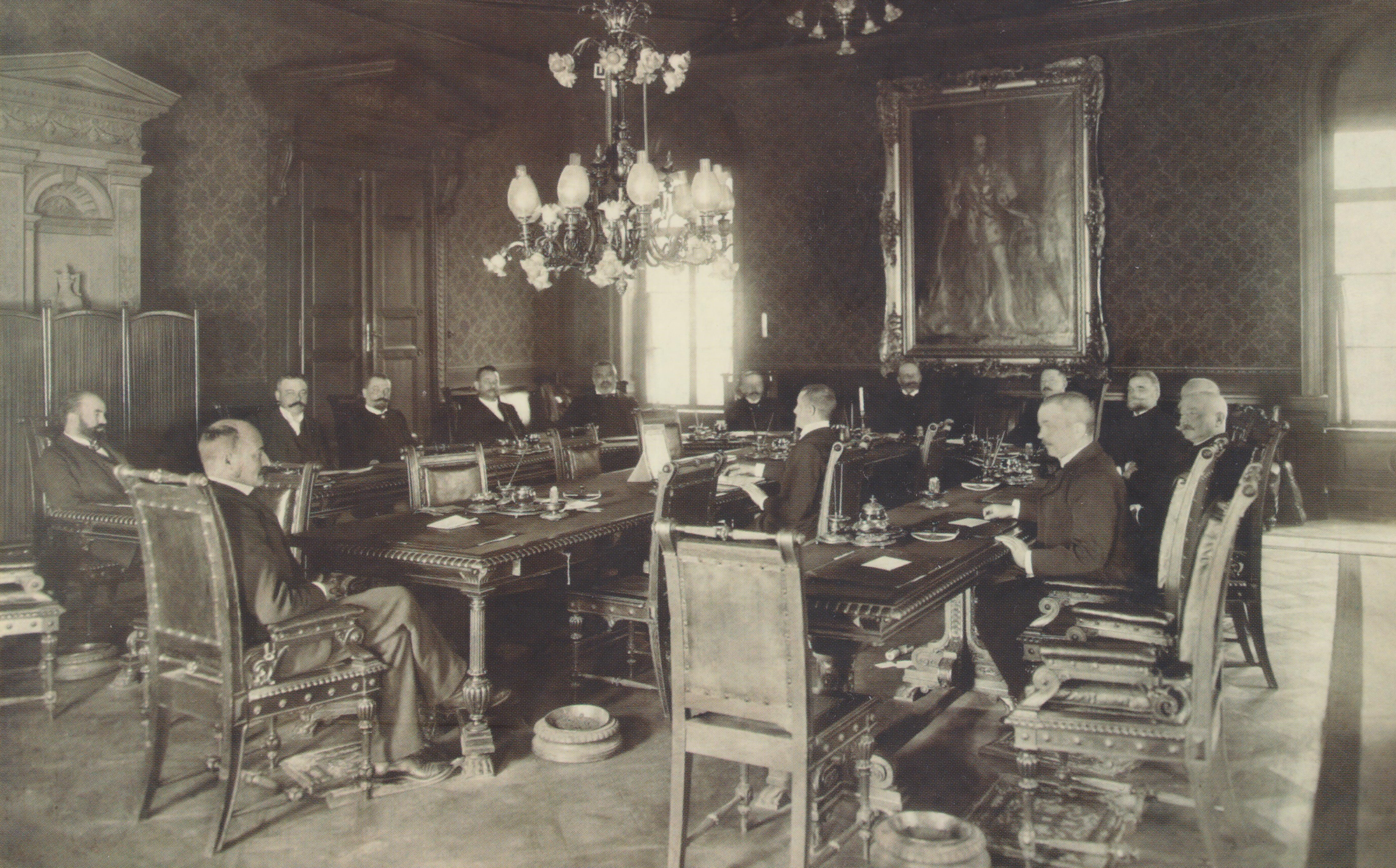
Halmos (center) chairs the last council meeting at the Old City Hall on 8 February 1900

Due to his commitment to the city administrative reform, the Halmos administration assigned few minor administrative cases to lower-ranking committees and councils by 1899. In 1900, a 30-member ad hoc committee was appointed to review the operation of the city administration in order to increase efficiency. However still during Halmos' mayoral term, only limited and modest steps have been taken towards modernization, as the city administration did not assume political responsibility for drastically reducing the number of the staff. Because of the resistance of the General Assembly, Halmos failed to introduce new municipal taxes, for instance "progressive tax" in 1899, "progressive poverty tax" in 1902 and "municipal inheritance tax" in 1903. However the first ever "road tax for bicyclists" was approved by the administrative body, but it was not associated with significant revenues.

Despite the lack of visible successes, Halmos was awarded a title of royal counselor by King Francis Joseph in the spring of 1898. As a recognition of his activity during the 25th anniversary of the unification of Budapest in November 1898, he was awarded the Order of the Iron Crown 3rd Class. Since 1898, Halmos served as President of the Metropolitan Committee which was responsible for the Budapest pavilion at the site of the 1900 Exposition Universelle in Paris. He also chaired that professional bodies which drafted the water supply ordinance in 1899 and planned the construction plan of the Sáros Baths (today Gellért Baths), which complex was only built between 1912 and 1918 in the Art Nouveau style. During his term as mayor, Halmos was famous for his oratorical skills and produced long term memory, according to councillor Ferenc Harrer.

The Hungarian Parliament Building, which intended to express the sovereignty of the nation, was completed in 1904 after a twenty-year-old construction. The old Elisabeth Bridge, a decorative suspension bridge of chains was built between 1897 and 1903 amid a corruption scandal. The Buda end of Erzsébet bridge ran directly into the massive foot of Gellért Hill, necessitating a complicated arrangement of roads to connect to the bridge. The bridge was designed in such a way because wealthy magnates and councillors owned the particular area of the riverbank. They made their fortune by selling the piece of land for bridge construction purposes, bribing the other councilmen and engineers on purpose, and managed to sell the land at greatly inflated prices. The St. Stephen's Basilica, then the second largest church building in Hungary, was completed in 1905 after 54 years of construction, according to the plans of Miklós Ybl. The Fisherman's Bastion was designed and built between 1895 and 1902 on the plans of Frigyes Schulek, while a bronze statue of Stephen I of Hungary mounted on a horse, erected in 1906, still can be seen between the Bastion and the Matthias Church.

Halmos was unanimously re-elected as mayor for a second six-year full term on 22 December 1903. By then the previous balanced relationship disintegrated between the Hungarian government and the city administration, in addition to economic downturn. Following the 1905 parliamentary election, a major constitutional crisis broke out when Francis Joseph appointed Géza Fejérváry as Prime Minister, ignoring the election results which saw a massive victory of the opposition Party of Independence and '48. Along with others, the Budapest administration declared that the Fejérváry ministry was unconstitutional on 28 June 1905, and participated in the passive resistance against it. Accordingly, the General Assembly decided not to provide the collected taxes to the central budget, and also forbade Halmos to execute the government decrees. Both Márkus and Halmos disagreed with the resistance, thereafter the Minister of the Interior József Kristóffy declared void the General Assembly's decision. As a result, they became unpopular figures within the city administration. Halmos was unable to pass his compromise proposal through the General Assembly, therefore, officially referring to his declining health, he resigned from his position on 17 February 1906, along with Lord Mayor Márkus. Fellow councillors warmly farewelled the outgoing mayor. János Hock noted Halmos gave an example "how to love our capital city, and how to work for its benefit with true enthusiasm and warm affection, unbreakable stamina and endurance and without representing particular interests".

The former mayor suffered stomach disease since a long time. His inglorious departure and forced resignation, and the death of his spouse in the same year mentally and physically worn out him. He died on 17 April 1907, aged 59.

== Sources ==
- Sipos, András (2008). ""Dualizmus" a főváros élén. A főpolgármesteri és a polgármesteri intézmény, 1873–1950". In Feitl, István (ed.). A főváros élén. Budapest főpolgármesterei és polgármesterei, 1873–1950 [=At the Helm of the Capital: Lord Mayors and Mayors of Budapest, 1873–1950] (in Hungarian). Napvilág Kiadó. pp. 11–26. ISBN 978-963-9697-19-5.
- Varsányi, Erika (2008). "Halmos János". In Feitl, István (ed.). A főváros élén. Budapest főpolgármesterei és polgármesterei, 1873–1950 [=At the Helm of the Capital: Lord Mayors and Mayors of Budapest, 1873–1950] (in Hungarian). Napvilág Kiadó. pp. 155–160. ISBN 978-963-9697-19-5.
- Vörös, Károly, ed. (1978). Budapest története IV. A márciusi forradalomtól az őszirózsás forradalomig [=History of Budapest IV.: From the March Revolution to the Aster Revolution] (in Hungarian). Akadémiai Kiadó. ISBN 963-05-1083-9.

Political offices
Preceded by József Márkus	Mayor of Budapest; 1897–1906	Succeeded by István Bárczy
