= Sharrer =

Sharrer is a surname. Notable people with the surname include:

- Eugene Sharrer, British businessman
- Honoré Desmond Sharrer (1920–2009), American artist

== See also ==
- Harrer (surname)
- Jay Sharrers (born 1967), Canadian ice hockey official
- Sharer
