= Harrer (surname) =

Harrer is a German surname. It commonly refers to Heinrich Harrer (1912–2006), Austrian mountaineer, sportsman, geographer, and writer.

Other notable people with the surname include:

- Alois Harrer (1926–2009), West German cross-country skier
- Corinna Harrer (born 1991), German middle-distance runner
- David Harrer (born 1990), Austrian football (soccer) midfielder
- Ferenc Harrer (1874–1969), Hungarian politician, Minister of Foreign Affairs in 1919
- Gottlob Harrer (1703–1755), German composer
- Karl Harrer (1890–1926), German journalist and politician
- Martin Harrer (born 1992), Austrian football (soccer) forward
- Pál Harrer (1829–1914), Hungarian councillor and politician
- Tim Harrer (born 1957), American ice hockey player
- Viona Harrer (born 1986), German ice hockey player

== Other uses ==
- Harrer Building, a historic building located at 8051 North Lincoln Avenue in Skokie, Illinois

== See also ==
- Harar, also spelled as Harrar, a walled city in eastern Ethiopia
