= Emília Márkus =

Hungarian actress (1860–1949)

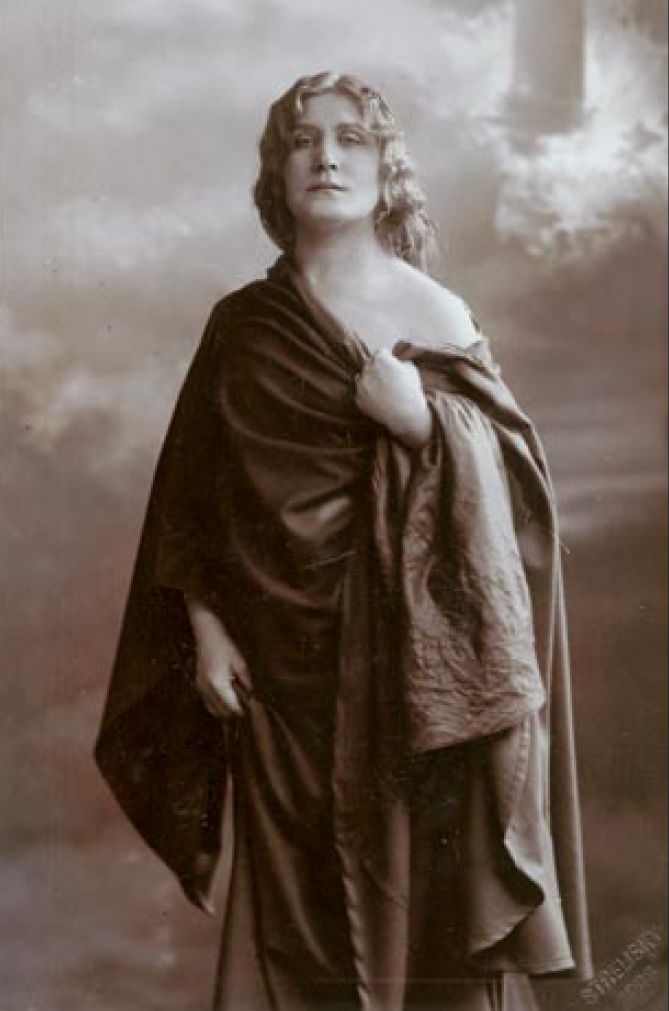
- Márkus in 1903
- Born: September 10, 1860; Szombathely, Hungary
- Died: December 24, 1949 (aged 89)
- Occupations: Aristocrat; politician; actress
- Family: József Márkus (brother)

Emília Márkus (married name Pulszky; September 10, 1860 – December 24, 1949) was a Hungarian aristocrat, politician and the most renowned actress of her time in Hungary, known for her roles in a number of Hungarian theatrical and film productions, including Three Spinsters (1936), A táncz (1901), and Az aranyhajú szfinksz (1914).

== Biography ==
Emília Márkus was born in Szombathely, Hungary as the sixth child of József Márkus and Anna Horvát (sister of Boldizsár Horvát). One of her brothers was József Márkus, the Mayor (1896–1897) then Lord Mayor of Budapest (1897–1906).

In 1878 she graduated from the Actor's Academy and was immediately contracted by the National Theatre, where she was engaged until her death in 1949. On June 7, 1882, she married Károly Pulszky (1853–1899), a Hungarian art collector, politician, member of Parliament and director of the Hungarian National Gallery of Art and founder of the Museum of Fine Arts in Budapest. Károly's family came from Poland and were of French Huguenot descent, but had converted to Catholicism. Her first daughter, Terézia Pulszky (born on May 5, 1883) was called Tessa. Her second daughter, Romola de Pulszky, born on February 19, 1891, married Vaslav Nijinsky. Károly Pulszky went into exile because of a political scandal associated with art purchases for the gallery, first to London and then to Australia. After 17 years of marriage, he committed suicide at the age of 45 in Brisbane, Australia. Emília was remarried to Oscar Pardany in 1903.

== Cultural depictions ==
=== In film ===
- The Dancer (planned film, 1970). The screenplay was written by playwright Edward Albee. The film was to be directed by Tony Richardson and star Rudolf Nureyev as Nijinsky, Claude Jade as Romola and Paul Scofield as Diaghilev, but producer Harry Saltzman canceled the project during pre-production.
- Nijinsky (1980), directed by Herbert Ross, starring professional dancers George de la Peña as Nijinsky and Leslie Browne as Romola, with Alan Bates as Diaghilev, Jeremy Irons as Fokine and Janet Suzman as Emilia Markus. Romola Nijinsky had a writing credit for the film.
- The Diaries of Vaslav Nijinsky (2001), written, directed, shot and edited by Paul Cox. The screenplay was based on Nijinsky's diaries, with the speeches read over related imagery by Derek Jacobi. The subject matter included his work, his illness, and his relationships with Diaghilev and Romola. Several Leigh Warren Dancers portrayed the dancer.
