= Heltai =

Heltai is a Hungarian surname. Notable people with the surname include:

- Ferenc Heltai (1861–1913), Hungarian politician and economics writer
- Gáspár Heltai (c. 1510–1574), Protestant writer and printer from Transylvania
- Jenő Heltai (1871–1957), Hungarian author, poet, journalist and producer

== See also ==
- Heltay
