= Hairer =

Hairer is a surname. Notable people with the surname include:

- Ernst Hairer (born 1949), Austrian mathematician
- Martin Hairer (born 1975), Austrian mathematician

== See also ==
- Harrer (surname)
