= Pál Harrer =

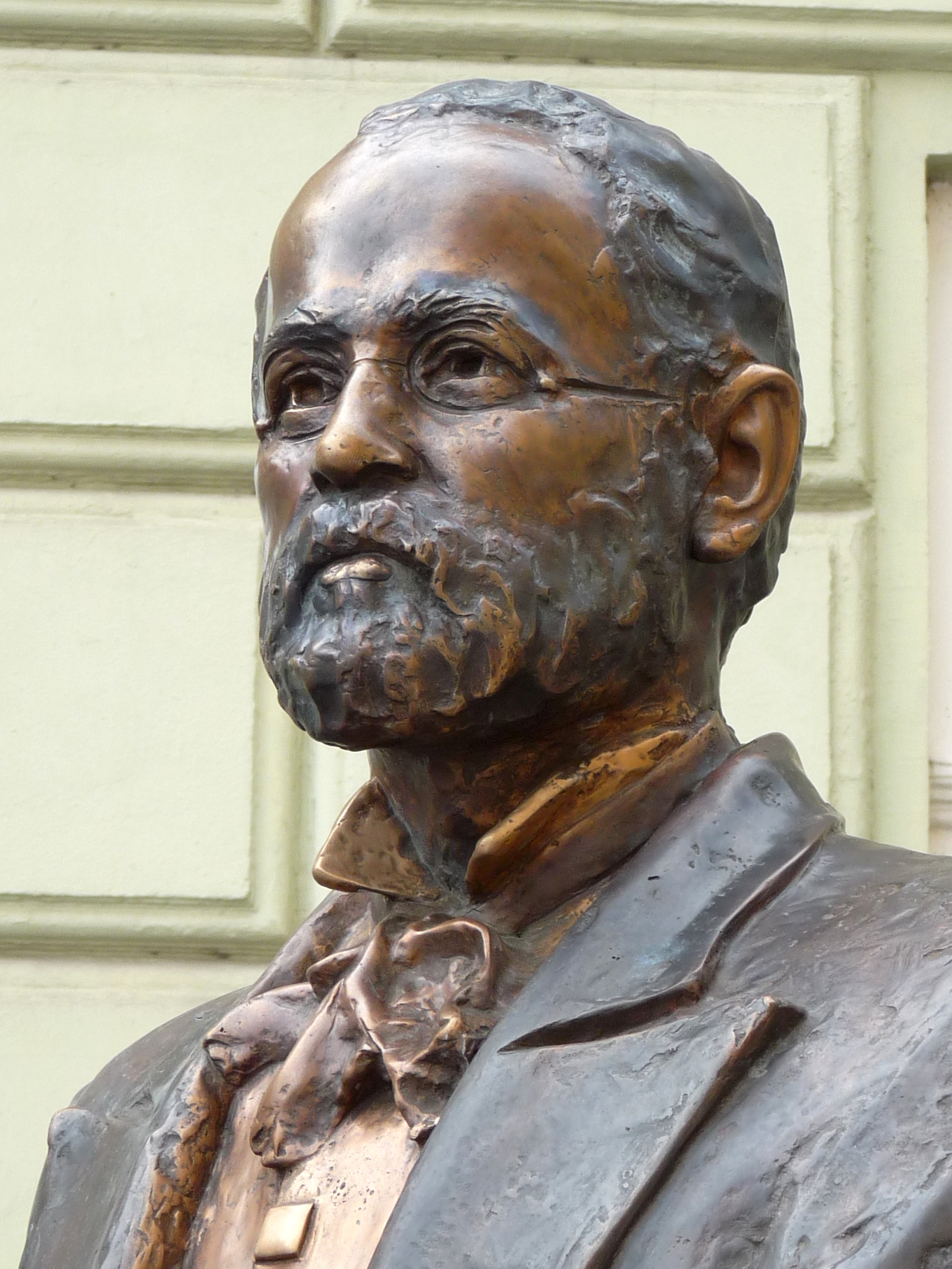
- Statue of Pál Harrer (detail)

Mayor of Óbuda
- In office 10 November 1872 – 4 November 1873
- Preceded by: Office established
- Succeeded by: Károly Kamermayer as Mayor of Budapest

Personal details
- Born: 18 October 1829 Óbuda, Hungary
- Died: 27 July 1914 (aged 84) Budapest, Austria-Hungary
- Party: Independent
- Spouse: Anna Mussard
- Children: Ferenc
- Profession: politician

Pál Harrer (18 October 1829 – 27 July 1914) was a Hungarian councillor and politician, who served as the first and only Mayor of Óbuda from 10 November 1872 until its unification with the towns of Buda and Pest to form Budapest in 1873.

== Biography ==
Pál Harrer was born into a poor farming family of Swabian origin as the son of Pál Harrer Sr. and Katalin Thaller. His mother tongue was the German language. Due to a congenital disorder affecting his left hand, Harrer chose an administrative career after finishing his secondary studies in Esztergom and Buda. Because of his family's financial situation, he was unable to start his studies in higher education. He entered civil service in 1848, working as a clerk at the Óbuda local government. He was appointed notary of Óbuda on 1 January 1850, when the town was administratively attached to Buda.

In 1872, Óbuda received the status of "town with settled council" (or borough) from King Francis Joseph. Harrer was elected the first mayor of the town on 10 November 1872. He held the position until the election of the first Mayor of Budapest, Károly Kamermayer, on 4 November 1873. Harrer actively supported the merger process. After the unification, Harrer functioned as prefect of Óbuda (3rd district or prefecture of Budapest, today called Óbuda-Békásmegyer) until his retirement in 1886.

His son was the jurist and MP Ferenc Harrer, who served as Minister of Foreign Affairs in 1919, and was a key promoter of the establishment of Greater Budapest.

Harrer's life-size bronze statue sculpted by László Kutas was unveiled on 5 March 2010 in Óbuda, next to the town hall. A local secondary grammar school is also named after him.

== Sources ==
- Harrer, Ferenc (1968). Egy magyar polgár élete [=The Life of a Hungarian Bourgeois] (in Hungarian). Gondolat Kiadó.

Political offices
Preceded by Office established	Mayor of Óbuda; 1872–1873	Succeeded by Károly Kamermayer as Mayor of Budapest
