= István Bárczy =

Hungarian politician

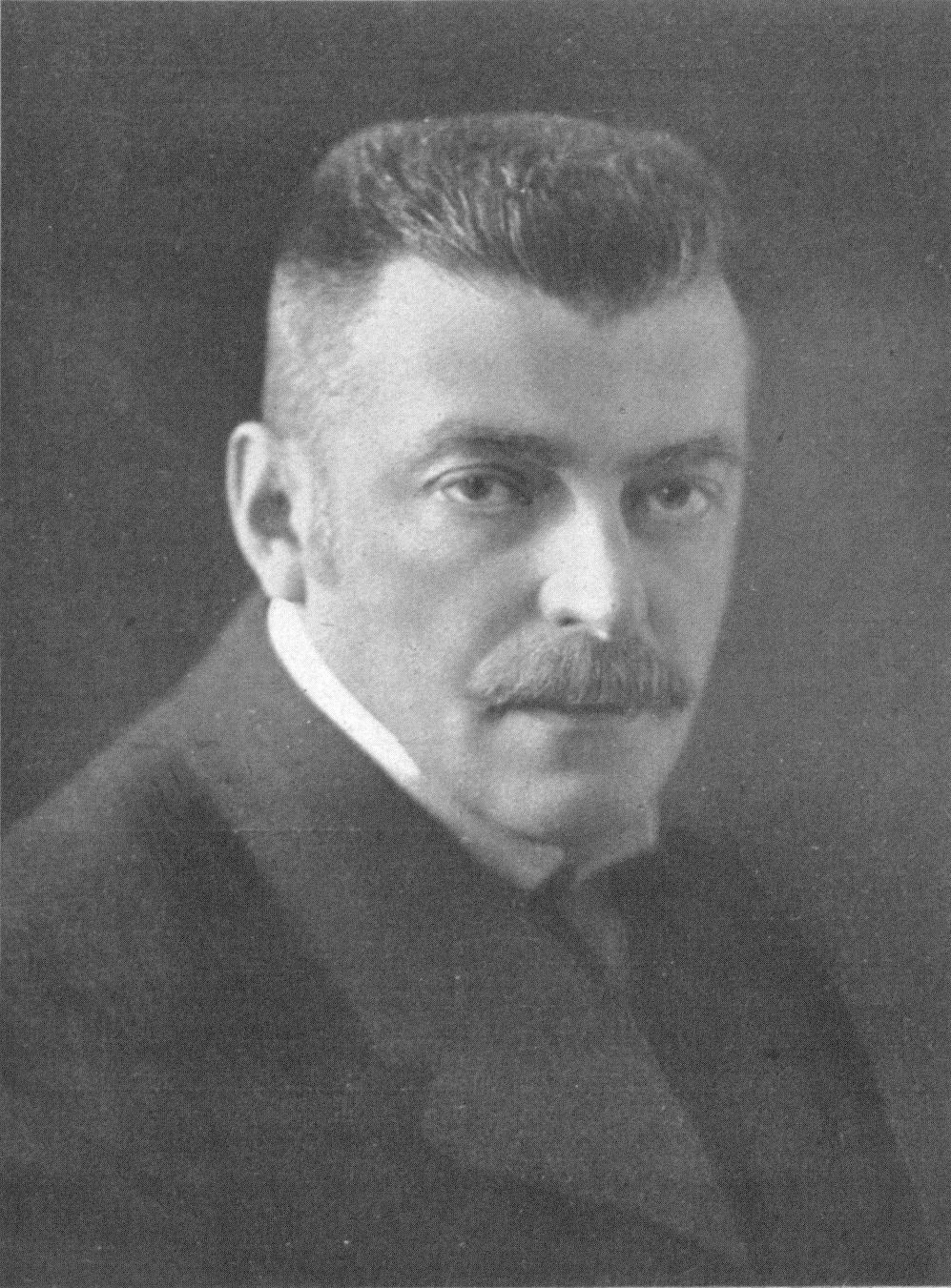

Minister of justice
- In office 24 November 1919 – 15 March 1920
- Preceded by: Béla Zoltán
- Succeeded by: Gyula Ferdinandy

Personal details
- Born: 3 October 1866 Pest, Kingdom of Hungary, Austrian Empire
- Died: 1 June 1943 (aged 76) Budapest, Hungary
- Political party: National Democratic Civil Party
- Profession: Politician, jurist

István Bárczy (3 October 1866 – 1 June 1943) was a Hungarian politician and jurist, who was minister of justice between 1919 and 1920. He was the mayor of Budapest between 1906 and 1918 and later lord mayor of Budapest (the representative of the Hungarian government in the capital city until 1945). He was a member of the diet of Hungary from 1920 to 1931.

== Sources ==
- Erdei, Gyöngyi (1991). Fejezetek a Bárczy-korszak történetéből. Budapest művelődéspolitikája a századelőn [=Chapters from the History of the Bárczy Era: The Cultural Policy of Budapest at The Early Twentieth Century] (in Hungarian). Szabó Ervin Metropolitan Library. ISBN 963-03-3322-8.
- Erdei, Gyöngyi (1995). "A mintaadó polgármester, Bárczy István beruházási programja (1906–1914)". Budapesti Negyed. 9 (Autumn). Budapest City Archives: 97–116.
- György, Péter (1993). "Nagy-Budapest – Az elképzelések és a valóság". Budapesti Negyed. 1 (2). Budapest City Archives: 68–90.
- Horváth J., András (2010). "Önkormányzati képviselő-választások, 1867–1912". In Feitl, István; Ignácz, Károly (eds.). Önkormányzati választások Budapesten, 1867–2010 [=Municipal Elections in Budapest, 1867–2010] (in Hungarian). Napvilág Kiadó. pp. 13–55. ISBN 978-963-9697-79-9.
- Kun, Andor; Lengyel, László; Vidor, Gyula, eds. (1927). "Bárczy István". Magyar Országgyűlési Almanach, 1927–1932. A felsőház és képviselőház tagjainak életrajza és közéleti működése [=Almanach of the National Assembly of Hungary, 1927–1932: Biographical Data of Members of the House of Magnates and the House of Representatives] (in Hungarian). Légrády Nyomda. pp. 30–31.
- Sipos, András (2008). ""Dualizmus" a főváros élén. A főpolgármesteri és a polgármesteri intézmény, 1873–1950". In Feitl, István (ed.). A főváros élén. Budapest főpolgármesterei és polgármesterei, 1873–1950 [=At the Helm of the Capital: Lord Mayors and Mayors of Budapest, 1873–1950] (in Hungarian). Napvilág Kiadó. pp. 11–26. ISBN 978-963-9697-19-5.
- Varsányi, Erika (2008). "Bárczy István". In Feitl, István (ed.). A főváros élén. Budapest főpolgármesterei és polgármesterei, 1873–1950 [=At the Helm of the Capital: Lord Mayors and Mayors of Budapest, 1873–1950] (in Hungarian). Napvilág Kiadó. pp. 163–177. ISBN 978-963-9697-19-5.
- Vértesy, Miklós (1976). "Bárczy István építési akciója". Budapest. 14 (3). Capital City of Budapest Press: 37–39.
- Vértesy, Miklós (1979). "Községesítések Bárczy István polgármestersége alatt". Budapest. 17 (11). Capital City of Budapest Press: 20–21.
- Vörös, Károly, ed. (1978). Budapest története IV. A márciusi forradalomtól az őszirózsás forradalomig [=History of Budapest IV.: From the March Revolution to the Aster Revolution] (in Hungarian). Akadémiai Kiadó. ISBN 963-05-1083-9.

Political offices
Preceded by János Halmos	Mayor of Budapest; 1906–1918	Succeeded by Tivadar Bódy
Vacant Title last held by Ferenc Heltai	Lord Mayor of Budapest; 1918–1919	Vacant Title next held by Jenő Sipőcz
Preceded by Béla Zoltán	Minister of Justice; 1919–1920	Succeeded by Gyula Ferdinandy
