= Ferenc Reitter =

Hungarian architect and engineer

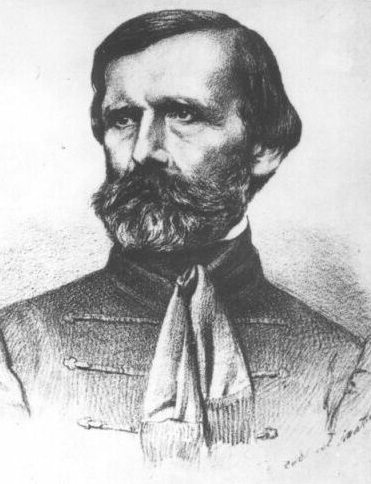
- Ferenc Reitter
- Born: Franz Reitter; 1 March 1813; Temesvár, Kingdom of Hungary, Austrian Empire
- Died: 9 December 1874; Budapest, Austria-Hungary
- Education: Technical University of Budapest, Budapest
- Occupation: Architect

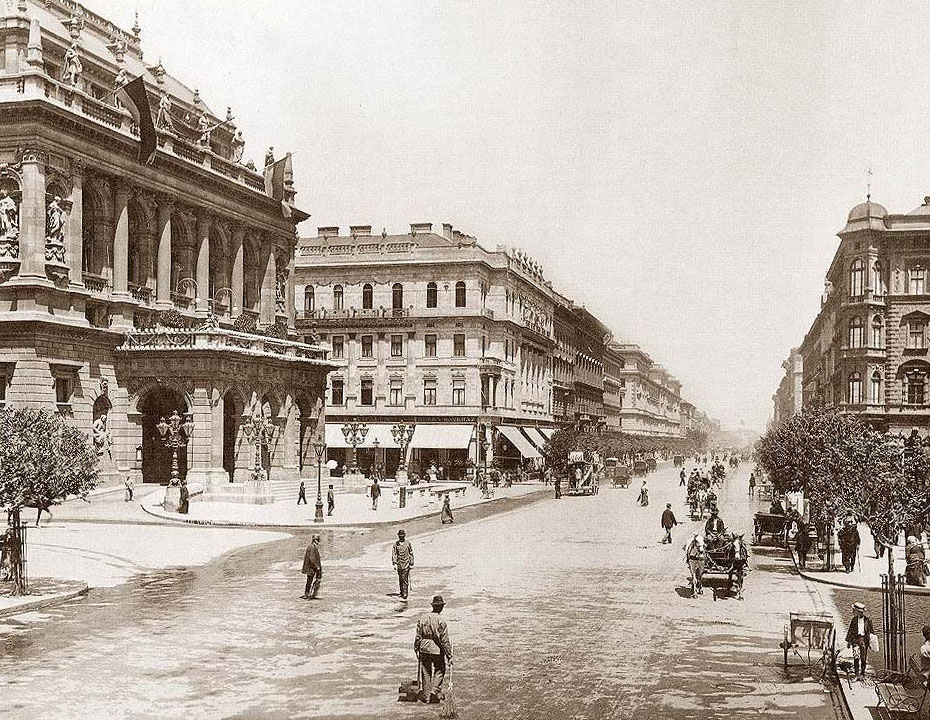
Andrássy út in 1896, with the State Opera House, left

Ferenc Reitter (born as Franz Reitter, March 1, 1813 in Temesvár, Hungary (now Timișoara, Romania) – December 9, 1874 in Budapest, Hungary) was a Hungarian architect and engineer who is credited with constructing several landmarks in Budapest.

== Career ==
Reitter finished his studies at Technical University of Budapest in 1833 and until 1844 worked on the mapping and study of the Tisza and Maros rivers. He also took part in the channelling of the Danube river.

He had a major role in the capital's department of public works during the rebuilding of Budapest during the second half of the nineteenth century. As director he was largely responsible for the building of the city's quays, channelling of the riverbanks and the planning of the ring roads and axial roads, Andrássy út in particular. This was to become the most important thoroughfare in Pest. Its construction was first considered in 1871 and it opened to traffic in 1896 to coincide with the millenarian anniversary of the Magyars' arrival in the Carpathian Basin in 1896.

Reitter planned the route to follow a major swampy branch of the Danube river, which swings eastward in a large arch from Danube to Danube over a distance of 4.141 meters. The canal passed through a suburban district of narrow streets and, at the time, Reitter also considered making the backwater into a navigable canal to improve the air quality and lessen pollution.

However, a solid thoroughfare was agreed upon and its construction took place at the same time as that of Sugár út, latterly Andrássy Avenue.

In 1865 Reitter became a member of the Hungarian Academy of Sciences.
