= Harrer Building =

- U.S. National Register of Historic Places
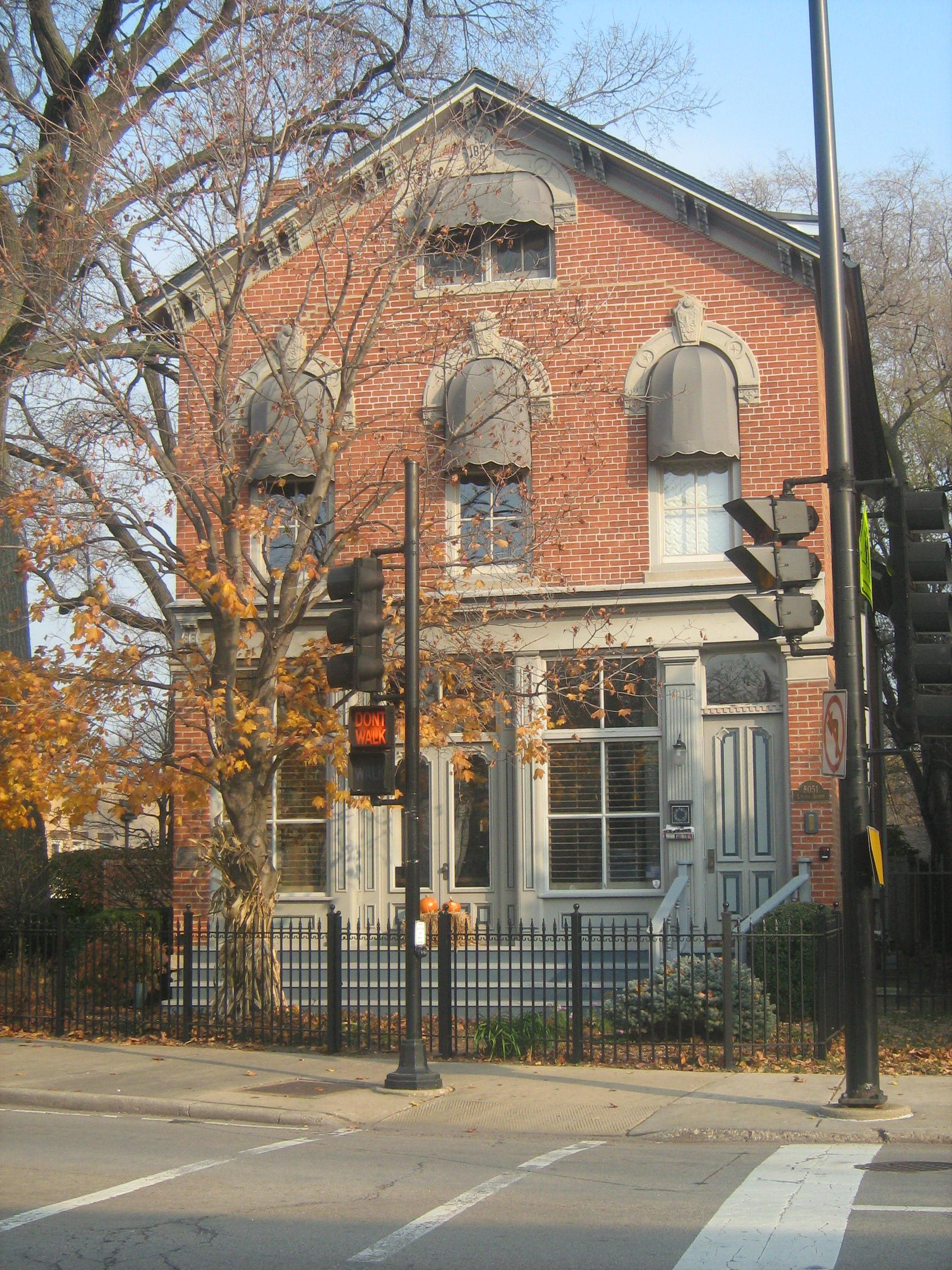

- Location within Illinois Location within the United States
- Location: 8051 Lincoln Ave., Skokie, Illinois
- Coordinates: 42°1′39″N 87°45′14″W
- Area: less than one acre
- Built: 1874; 152 years ago
- Architect: Harrer, Michael
- Architectural style: Italianate
- NRHP reference No.: 83000310
- Added to NRHP: February 17, 1983

The Harrer Building is a historic building located at 8051 North Lincoln Avenue in Skokie, Illinois.

== Description and history ==
Michael Harrer, a Bavarian immigrant, built the building in 1874 for his family's home and his meat market. Harrer's meat market was the first in the village, then known as Niles Center, and the building is the oldest extant commercial building in Skokie. In addition, the building's Italianate style architecture is unique among Skokie commercial buildings. The Harrer family played a significant role in the development of Niles Center; Michael Harrer was a village trustee, and his son Adam was the first village president.

It was added to the National Register of Historic Places on February 17, 1983.
