= Ferenc Heltai =

Hungarian politician

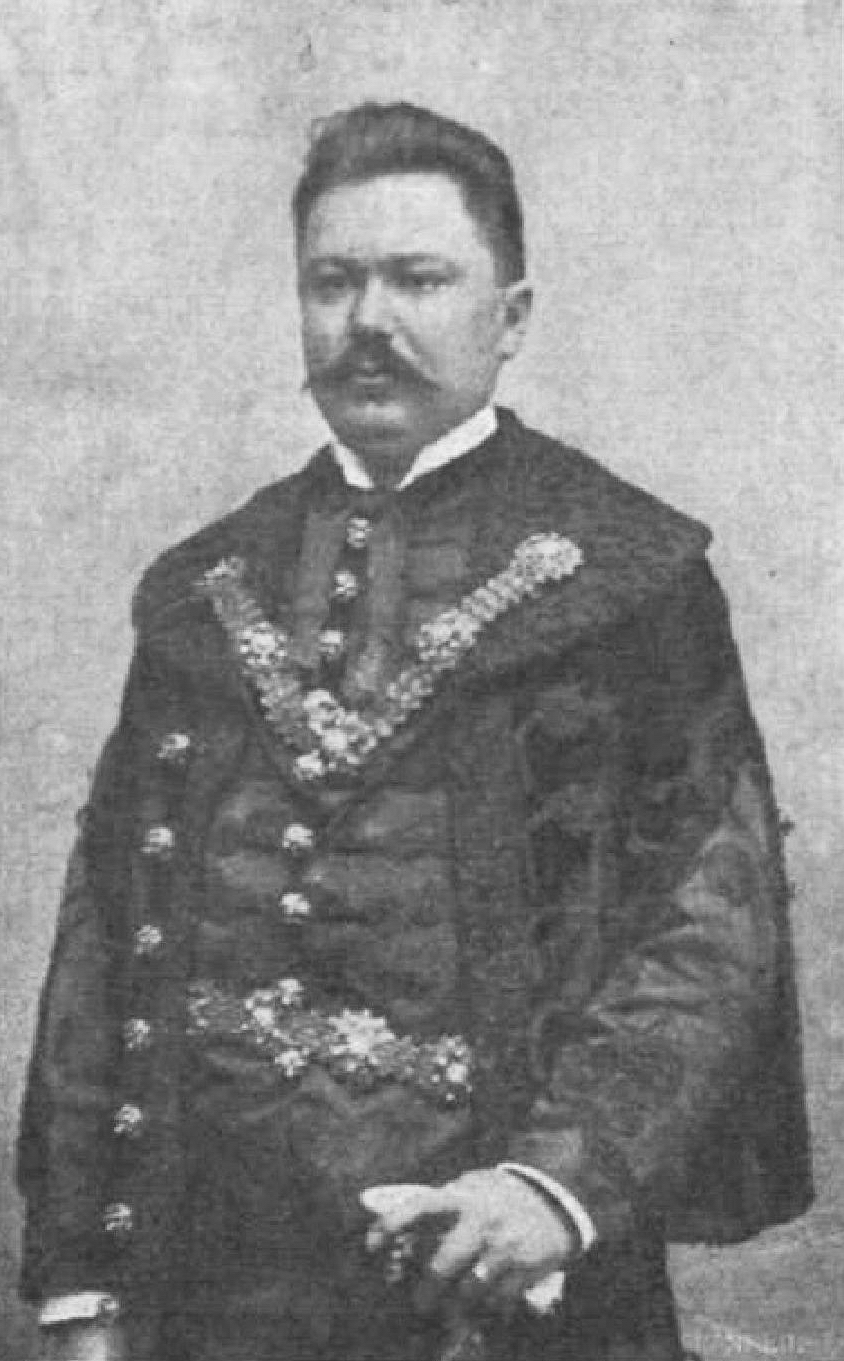

Lord Mayor of Budapest
- In office 15 February 1913 – 11 August 1913
- Preceded by: Kálmán Fülepp
- Succeeded by: István Bárczy (1918)

Personal details
- Born: 15 March 1861 Szentes, Kingdom of Hungary, Austrian Empire
- Died: 11 August 1913 (aged 52) Bad Ischl, Austria-Hungary
- Political party: National Party of Work
- Profession: politician, lawyer

Ferenc Heltai, born as Ferenc Hoffer (15 March 1861 – 11 August 1913), was a Hungarian politician and economics writer. He served as Lord Mayor of Budapest in 1913. He also served as a member of the House of Representatives between 1896 and 1913.

== Early life ==
Heltai was born in Szentes in a Jewish family. He was the son of landowner Lőrinc Hoffer (1830-1889) and Katalin Grünvald. He studied law at the University of Budapest and Leipzig, where he obtained a doctorate.

== Career ==
=== Journalism ===
Heltai became a publicist. He worked as an economics columnist for Ellenőr in 1881. After two years he joined Nemzet newspapers. In 1884, he was elected to the National Economics Committee of the Hungarian Academy of Sciences. He was commissioned to edit the National Economic Review. He then took over the editorship of the Railway and Transport Gazette and drafted the law on the reorganization of the capital's district magistrates.

=== Politics ===
In 1896 he became active in politics. From 1896 to 1913, he was a member of Parliament. He became a frequent speaker in the economic and financial committees. In 1904 he became part of the delegation and his speeches focused on the naval issue. He played a prominent role in the capital. As early as 1891 he was a member of the city's council of representatives and then of the council of public works. In 1907, he became director of the General Austro-Hungarian Air-brine Company, In 1909 he was appointed general manager of Budapest Gas Works.

From this position he was appointed Mayor of Budapest on 15 February 1913, He resigned his seat as a member of the Budapest Parliament and was appointed by the King as a member of the House of Lords.

=== Literature ===
He was active in literature, penning economic studies, editing memoirs, and drafting laws. He was a pioneer in the field of the administration of the capital. One of his studies, entitled "Hungarians in the Army" (1904), was published separately.

==== Publications ====
- "The assertion of the Hungarians in the army": a parliamentary debate on four laws, Budapest, 1903

== Recognition ==
- He won an academic prize for "The Revision of the Industrial Law," which served as the basis for the Article XVI of the 1884 Law.

== Death ==
Heltai died at the age of 52 on August 11, 1913. After his death a street was named after him in the capital city.

Political offices
Preceded by Kálmán Fülepp	Lord Mayor of Budapest; 1913	Vacant Title next held by István Bárczy
