= Coat of arms of Budapest =

Versions
- Armiger: Capital City of Budapest
- Adopted: 29 May 1873; 30 September 1990 (readopted)
- Crest: Holy Crown of Hungary
- Supporters: On the dexter a lion Or and on the sinister a griffin Or
- Compartment: Pedestal

The coat of arms of Budapest (capital city of Hungary) has existed since 1873, when the three main cities next to the Danube river (Buda, Pest and Óbuda) were united in one after existing during a millennium separately. The city committee that was planning the city's unification asked the master-painter Lajos Friedrich to design the coat of arms based on the cities' previous symbols and coats.

== Description of the coat of arms ==
The coat of arms is composed of two blasons: the superior contains a castle with one tower that represents Pest, as well the inferior a three-towered castle that actually symbolizes Buda (where the Royal Palace of Buda is located). The undulated white stripe in the middle of both blasons represents the Danube river which separates Buda and Pest (passing through the middle of the city). On the top of the coat of arms lies the Holy Crown of Hungary. A two-legged standing lion grabs the city symbol with its protector claws on the left side, with a mythological griffin on the right.

== History ==
After Hungary was invaded by the Soviet armies, soon the coat of arms lost the Holy Crown on it, and was used from 1946 to 1949 without it. Between 1964 and 1990, a new coat of arms was used, avoiding to use the traditional Hungarian symbols that did not match with the communist ideals. After the fall of the Soviet Union, Hungary recovered its independence and in 1990 the original coat of arms created in 1873 was again reestablished.

== Gallery ==
1873–1930

1930–1946

1946–1949

1949–1956

1956–1957

1957–1964

1964–1990

=== Coats of arms of districts ===
1st District

2nd District

3rd District

4th District

5th District

6th District

7th District

8th District

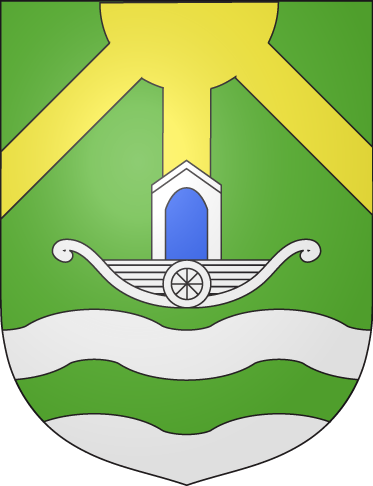
9th District

10th District

11th District

12th District

13th District

14th District

15th District

16th District

17th District

18th District

19th District

20th District

21st District

22nd District

23rd District

== Bibliography ==
- Czaga, Viktória (1998). Nyerges, András (ed.). Budapest arms & colours: throughout the centuries. Budapest: Budapest City Archives. ISBN 963-7323-15-5.
- Berza, László, ed. (1973). Budapest lexikon. Budapest: Akadémiai Kiadó.
