= Ferenc Harrer =

Hungarian politician

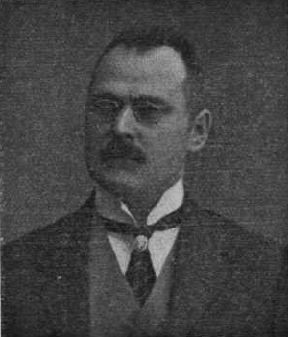

Minister of Foreign Affairs of Hungary
- In office 24 January 1919 – 21 March 1919
- Preceded by: Dénes Berinkey
- Succeeded by: Béla Kun

Personal details
- Born: 2 June 1874 Budapest, Austria-Hungary
- Died: 21 November 1969 (aged 95) Budapest, People's Republic of Hungary
- Party: PRP; HNF
- Profession: politician, jurist

Ferenc Harrer (2 June 1874 – 21 November 1969) was a Hungarian politician, who served as Minister of Foreign Affairs in 1919.

Political offices
Preceded by Dénes Berinkey	Minister of Foreign Affairs; 1919	Succeeded by Béla Kun
