= Lord Mayor of Budapest =

- Budapest főpolgármestere
- Coat of arms of Budapest

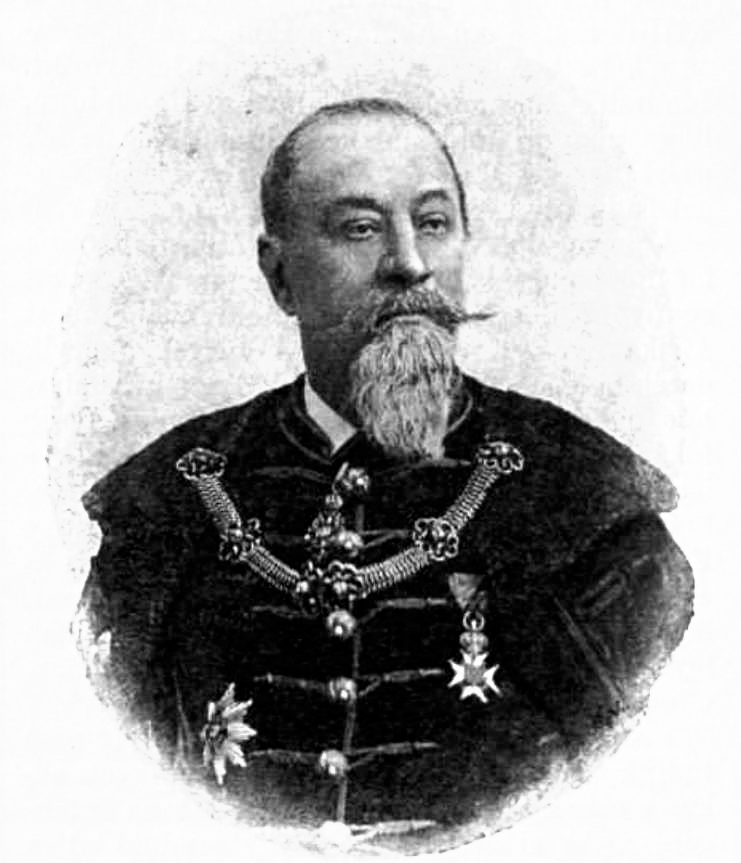
- Károly Ráth
- Appointer: General Assembly
- Inaugural holder: Károly Ráth
- Formation: 25 October 1873
- Final holder: Gyula Mohay
- Abolished: 27 March 1945

The Lord Mayor of Budapest (Hungarian: Budapest főpolgármestere) was a former political position, existed between 1873 and 1944 (or 1945) in Budapest, the capital of Hungary. The Lord Mayor was representative of the Hungarian government as head of the capital's municipal authority, similarly to the Lord-Lieutenants of Counties.

Since 1990, the position of Mayor of Budapest is domestically also known as "Lord Mayor" (Hungarian: főpolgármester) to distinguish the office from that of the mayors that lead each of Budapest's 23 districts.

== Sources ==
- Sipos, András (2008). ""Dualizmus" a főváros élén. A főpolgármesteri és a polgármesteri intézmény, 1873–1950". In Feitl, István (ed.). A főváros élén. Budapest főpolgármesterei és polgármesterei, 1873–1950 [=At the Helm of the Capital: Lord Mayors and Mayors of Budapest, 1873–1950] (in Hungarian). Napvilág Kiadó. pp. 11–26. ISBN 978-963-9697-19-5.
