= Budapest 10th constituency =

Constituency in Hungary (2012-)

Budapest 10th constituency (District III.)
- Constituency for the National Assembly
- Location of Budapest 10 within Budapest

- Location of Budapest within Hungary
- City: Budapest
- Electorate: 73,216 (2018)
- Major settlements: 3rd District

Current constituency
- Created: 2011
- Party: Tisza Party
- Member: Krisztián Kulcsár
- Created from: Constituency no. 3; Constituency no. 4
- Elected: 2026

The 10th constituency of Budapest (Hungarian: Budapesti 10. számú országgyűlési egyéni választókerület) is one of the single-member constituencies of the National Assembly, the national legislature of Hungary. The constituency standard abbreviation: Budapest 10. OEVK.

Since 2026, it has been represented by Krisztián Kulcsár of the Tisza Party.

== Geography ==
The 10th constituency is located in the northern part of Buda (Óbuda).

The constituency borders the 3rd constituency of Pest County to the north, the Budapest 11th constituency to the east, the Budapest 7th constituency to the southeast, and the Budapest 4th constituency to the south and west.

=== List of districts ===
The constituency includes the following municipalities:

1. District III.: Eastern part of the district.

== History ==
The current 10th constituency of Budapest was created in 2011 and contains parts of the pre-2011 3rd and 4th constituencies of Budapest. Its borders have not changed since its creation.

== Members ==
The constituency was first represented by László Kiss of MSZP (with Unity support) from 2014 to 2018. Tímea Szabó of the Dialogue was elected in 2018. In the 2026 election, Krisztián Kulcsár of the Tisza Party was elected representative.

Election	Member	Party	%
2014 (Note: Kiss was a member of MSZP. He ran as a joint candidate of the Unity electoral alliance during the 2014 parliamentary election.)	László Kiss	MSZP	38.2
2018	Tímea Szabó	Dialogue	48.2
2022	Tímea Szabó	Dialogue	48.8
2026	Krisztián Kulcsár	TISZA	63.2

== Election result ==
Result 2026
1. Krisztián Kulcsár, TISZA (63.2%)
2. Márk Kocsondi, Fidesz–KDNP (28.6%)
3. Előd Novák, Our Homeland (5.00%)
4. Gyula Molnár, DK (1.80%)
5. Dr. Ágnes Nelinger, MKKP (1.40%)

2026 parliamentary election: Budapest - 10th constituency
Party	Candidate	Votes	%	±%
Tisza	Krisztián Kulcsár	41,542	63.19	New
Fidesz–KDNP	Márk Kocsondi	18,829	28.64	−12.48
Mi Hazánk	Előd Novák	3,277	4.98	+1.32
DK	Gyula Molnár	1,184	1.80	
MKKP	Dr. Ágnes Nelinger	914	1.39	−2.27
Majority		22,713	34.55	
Turnout		66,052	85.72	▲8.44
Registered electors		77,060		
Tisza gain from United for Hungary		Swing		

=== 2022 election ===
Result 2022
1. Tímea Szabó, United for Hungary (48.8%)
2. Balázs Bús, Fidesz–KDNP (41.1%)
3. Sándor Budai, MKKP (3.70%)
4. Miklós Katona, Our Homeland (3.60%)
5. Imre Poteczki, MEMO (1.60%)
6. Other parties (less than 1%) (1.20%)

2022 parliamentary election: Budapest - 10th constituency
Party	Candidate	Votes	%	±%
United for Hungary	Tímea Szabó	26,051	48.82	
Fidesz–KDNP	Balázs Bús	21,940	41.12	+4.76
MKKP	Sándor Budai	1,954	3.66	
Mi Hazánk	Miklós Katona	1,929	3.61	New
MEMO	Imre Poteczki	826	1.55	New
VD (transl: real democrat party)	László Péter Rózsa	365	0.68	
NÉP (transl: party of normal life)	Anita Müller	296	0.55	New
Majority		4,111	7.7	
Turnout		53,916	77.28	▼0.2
Registered electors		69,771		
United for Hungary hold		Swing	-4.1	

=== 2018 election ===
Result 2018
1. Tímea Szabó, MSZP-P (48.2%)
2. Erzsébet Menczer, Fidesz–KDNP (36.3%)
3. Dániel Zsiga-Kárpát, Jobbik (10.8%)
4. Anna Júlia Donáth, Momentum (3.90%)
5. Other parties (less than 1%) (0.80%)

2018 parliamentary election: Budapest - 10th constituency
Party	Candidate	Votes	%	±%
MSZP–Dialogue	Tímea Szabó	27,017	48.15	as Unity
Fidesz–KDNP	Erzsébet Menczer	20,403	36.36	+0.54
Jobbik	Dániel Zsiga-Kárpát	6,070	10.82	−2.45
Momentum	Anna Júlia Donáth	2,213	3.94	New
Lendülettel	László Árpád Papp	141	0.25	
Iránytű	György Csaba Póznik	139	0.25	
Go Hungary!	Roland Petővári	127	0.23	
Majority		6,614	11.79	
Turnout		56,731	77.48	▲7.51
Registered electors		73,216		
MSZP–Dialogue hold		Swing	+9.4	

=== 2014 election ===
Result 2014
1. László Kiss, Unity (38.2%)
2. Erzsébet Livia Keszegné Menczer, Fidesz–KDNP (35.8%)
3. Dániel Gábor Zsiga-Kárpát, Jobbik (13.3%)
4. Dorottya Száraz, LMP (9.00%)
5. Dr. László János Brezovits, Greens (1.10%)
6. Other parties (less than 1%) (2.60%)

2014 parliamentary election: Budapest - 10th constituency
Party	Candidate	Votes	%	±%
Unity	László Kiss	19,633	38.24	
Fidesz–KDNP	Erzsébet Livia Keszegné Menczer	18,394	35.82	
Jobbik	Dániel Gábor Zsiga-Kárpát	6,815	13.27	
LMP	Dorottya Száraz	4,593	8.95	
Party of Greens	Dr. László János Brezovits	585	1.14	
Together 2014	Ágnes Balasi	443	0.86	
Soc Dems	György Csaba Póznik	309	0.6	
Motherland Party	István Kolozsváry	243	0.47	
ÖP	Judit Fodor	182	0.35	
JESZ	János Pál Pásztor	149	0.29	
Majority		1,239	2.42	
Turnout		51,945	69.97	
Registered electors		74,243		
Unity win (new seat)				
