= Budapest 4th constituency =

Hungarian legislative district

Budapest 4th constituency (District II.)
- Constituency for the National Assembly
- Location of Budapest 04 within Budapest

- Location of Budapest within Hungary
- City: Budapest
- Electorate: 71,431 (2018)
- Major settlements: 2nd District

Current constituency
- Created: 2011
- Party: Tisza Party
- Member: Áron Koncz
- Created from: Constituency no. 2; Constituency no. 4
- Elected: 2026

The 4th constituency of Budapest (Hungarian: Budapesti 04. számú országgyűlési egyéni választókerület) is one of the single-member constituencies of the National Assembly, the national legislature of Hungary. The constituency standard abbreviation: Budapest 04. OEVK.

Since 2026, it has been represented by Áron Koncz of the Tisza Party.

== Geography ==
The 4th constituency is located in the north-western part of Buda.

The constituency borders the 2nd constituency of Pest County to the northwest, the 3rd constituency of Pest County to the north, the 10th- and 7th constituencies to the east and the 3rd constituency to the south.

=== List of districts ===
The constituency includes the following municipalities:

1. District II.: Main part of the district (except Víziváros, Országút and south of the Hűvösvölgyi út).
2. District III.: Western part of the district.

== History ==
The current 4th constituency of Budapest was created in 2011 and contains parts of the pre-2011 2nd and 4th constituencies of Budapest. Its borders have not changed since its creation.

== Members ==
The constituency was first represented by Mihály Varga of the Fidesz from 2014 to 2022. He was succeeded by Bence Tordai of the Dialogue for Hungary in 2022 (with United for Hungary support). In the 2026 election, Áron Koncz of the Tisza Party was elected representative.

| Election | Member | Party | % | Ref. |
|---|---|---|---|---|
| 2014 | Mihály Varga | Fidesz | 45.90 | |
| 2018 | Mihály Varga | Fidesz | 41.82 | |
| 2022 (Note: Tordai was a member of Dialogue. He ran as a joint candidate of the United for Hungary electoral alliance during the 2022 parliamentary election.) | Bence Tordai | Dialogue | 51.89 | |
| 2026 | Áron Koncz | TISZA | 65.41 | |

== Election result ==
=== 2026 election ===
Result 2026
1. Áron Koncz, TISZA (65.4%)
2. Attila Fülöp, Fidesz–KDNP (28.9%)
3. Csaba Binder, Our Homeland (3.00%)
4. Emília Psili, MKKP (1.40%)
5. Beáta Hedgyesi, DK (1.20%)

2026 parliamentary election: Budapest - 4th constituency
| Party | Candidate | Votes | % | ±% |
|---|---|---|---|---|
| Tisza | Áron Koncz | 45,212 | 65.41 | New |
| Fidesz–KDNP | Attila Fülöp | 19,994 | 28.93 | −11.67 |
| Mi Hazánk | Csaba Binder | 2,103 | 3.04 | +0.7 |
| MKKP | Emília Psili | 990 | 1.43 | −0.37 |
| DK | Beáta Hedgyesi | 819 | 1.18 | |
| ~~Independent~~ | ~~Bence Tordai~~ | 0 | 0 | −51.89 |
| Majority | | 25,218 | 36.48 | |
| Turnout | | 69,469 | 86.48 | ▲4.53 |
| Registered electors | | 80,326 | | |
| Tisza gain from United for Hungary | | Swing | | |

=== 2022 election ===
Result 2022
1. Bence Tordai, United for Hungary (51.9%)
2. Dr. Csaba Gór, Fidesz–KDNP (40.6%)
3. Veronika Juhász, MKKP (3.70%)
4. Attila Nagy, Our Homeland (2.30%)
5. Diána Horváth, MEMO (1.10%)
6. József Láz, NÉP (0.40%)

2022 parliamentary election: Budapest - 4th constituency
| Party | Candidate | Votes | % | ±% |
|---|---|---|---|---|
| United for Hungary | Bence Tordai | 29,993 | 51.89 | |
| Fidesz–KDNP | Dr. Csaba Gór | 23,468 | 40.6 | −0.62 |
| MKKP | Veronika Juhász | 2,130 | 3.69 | +1.89 |
| Mi Hazánk | Attila Nagy | 1,352 | 2.34 | New |
| MEMO | Diána Horváth | 623 | 1.08 | New |
| NÉP | József Láz | 235 | 0.41 | New |
| Majority | | 6,525 | 11.29 | |
| Turnout | | 58,354 | 81.95 | ▲0.32 |
| Registered electors | | 71,208 | | |
| United for Hungary gain from Fidesz–KDNP | | Swing | +6.6 | |

=== 2018 election ===
Result 2018
1. Mihály Varga, Fidesz–KDNP (41.8%)
2. Péter Niedermüller, DK (37.1%)
3. Péter Ungár, LMP (10.1%)
4. Tamás Kovács, Jobbik (6.20%)
5. Márton Benedek, Momentum (2.70%)
6. Veronika Juhász, MKKP (1.80%)
7. István Arató, Workers' Party (0.30%)

2018 parliamentary election: Budapest - 4th constituency
| Party | Candidate | Votes | % | ±% |
|---|---|---|---|---|
| Fidesz–KDNP | Mihály Varga | 24,208 | 41.82 | −4.08 |
| DK | Péter Niedermüller | 21,496 | 37.14 | as Unity |
| LMP | Péter Ungár | 5,848 | 10.1 | +1.6 |
| Jobbik | Tamás Kovács | 3,585 | 6.19 | −0.41 |
| Momentum | Márton Benedek | 1,538 | 2.66 | New |
| MKKP | Veronika Juhász | 1,044 | 1.8 | New |
| Workers' Party | István Arató | 169 | 0.29 | |
| Majority | | 2,712 | 4.68 | |
| Turnout | | 58,309 | 81.63 | ▲4.83 |
| Registered electors | | 71,431 | | |
| Fidesz–KDNP hold | | Swing | +3.0 | |

=== 2014 election ===
Result 2014
1. Mihály Varga, Fidesz–KDNP (45.9%)
2. Zsuzsanna Szelényi, Unity (38.2%)
3. Zsuzsanna Terézia Dárdai, LMP (8.50%)
4. Zoltán Bodor, Jobbik (6.60%)
5. Zsanett Dea Suhajdáné Told, ÖP (0.80%)

2014 parliamentary election: Budapest - 4th constituency
| Party | Candidate | Votes | % | ±% |
|---|---|---|---|---|
| Fidesz–KDNP | Mihály Varga | 24,928 | 45.9 | |
| Unity | Zsuzsanna Szelényi | 20,750 | 38.21 | |
| LMP | Zsuzsanna Terézia Dárdai | 4,618 | 8.5 | |
| Jobbik | Zoltán Bodor | 3,583 | 6.6 | |
| ÖP | Zsanett Dea Suhajdáné Told | 432 | 0.8 | |
| Majority | | 4,178 | 7.69 | |
| Turnout | | 54,784 | 76.8 | |
| Registered electors | | 71,335 | | |
| Fidesz–KDNP win (new seat) | | | | |
