= Menczer =

Menczer is a surname. Notable people with the surname include:

- Erico Menczer (1926–2012), Italian cinematographer
- Erzsébet Menczer (born 1961), Hungarian journalist and politician
- Filippo Menczer (born 1965), American and Italian academic
- Gusztáv Menczer (born 1959), Hungarian sprinter
- Pauline Menczer (born 1970), Australian surfer
- Tamás Menczer (born 1984), Hungarian politician
