= Bence Tordai =

Hungarian politician

Bence Tordai MP
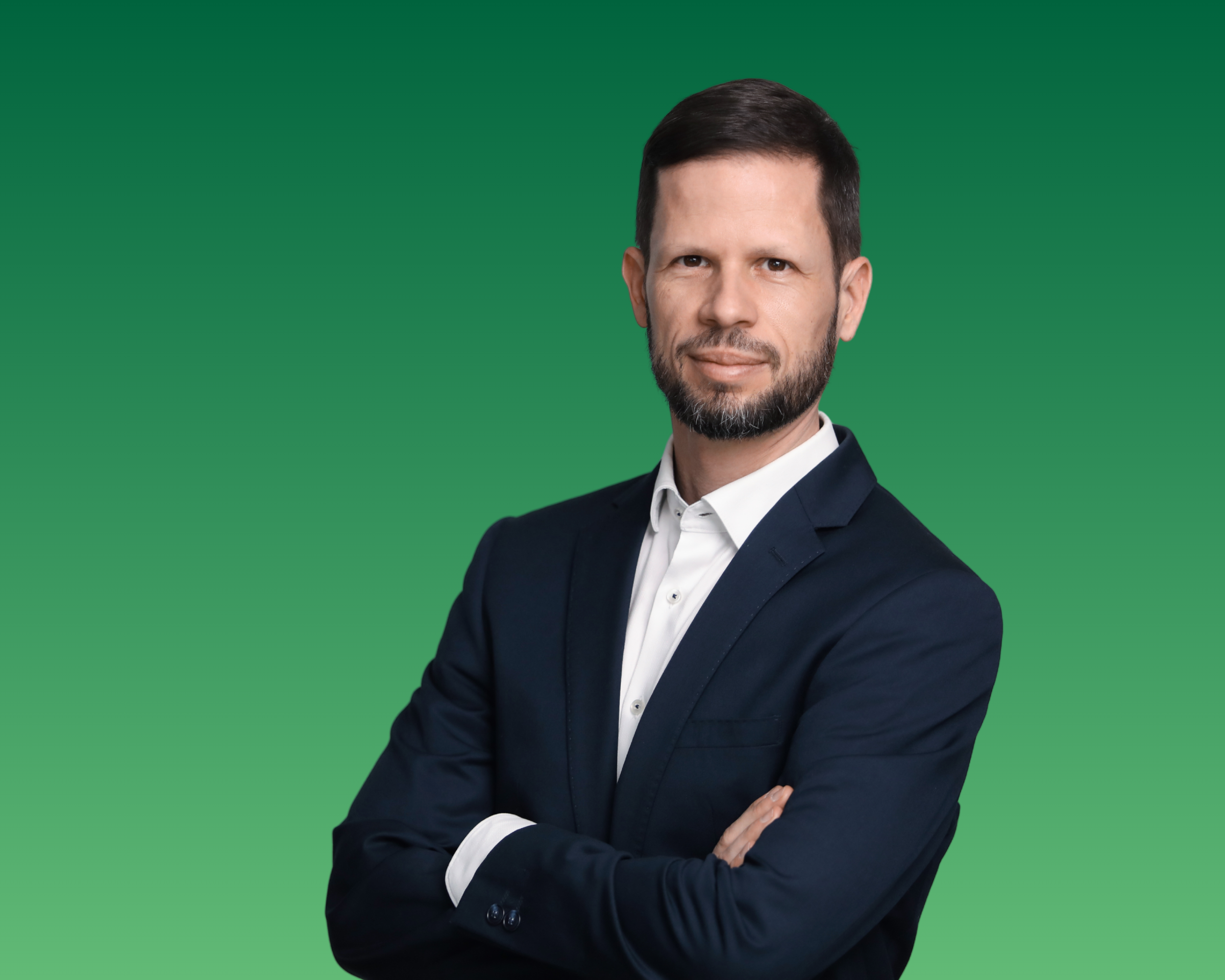
- Tordai in 2021

Member of the National Assembly
- In office 8 May 2018 – 8 May 2026

Personal details
- Born: 26 January 1981 (age 45) Budapest, Hungary
- Party: LMP (2009–2013); PM (2013–2024); Ind. (2024– )

Bence Tordai (born 26 January 1981) is a Hungarian politician, economist and sociologist. A founding member of Dialogue for Hungary, he had been Member of the National Assembly from 2018 to 2026. He has been co-leader of the Dialogue for Hungary from July 2022 to February 2024. He is leader of the parliamentary group since January 2024, a position he held too for a brief time from May 2022 to September 2022. He left the party on 9 June 2024.

== Early life and career ==
Born in Budapest in 1981, Tordai graduated from the Berzsenyi Dániel High School in 1999. He received his degree in economics from the Corvinus University of Budapest in 2005, where he was also a member of the College for Advanced Studies in Social Theory for 7 years. After graduation, Tordai worked as a statistician for the Hungarian Central Statistical Office. Between 2008 and 2015, he was a teacher at the Budapest Metropolitan University.

== Political career ==
In 2009, Tordai was a founding member of the Politics Can Be Different political movement. He was the party's spokesperson from 2010 to 2011.

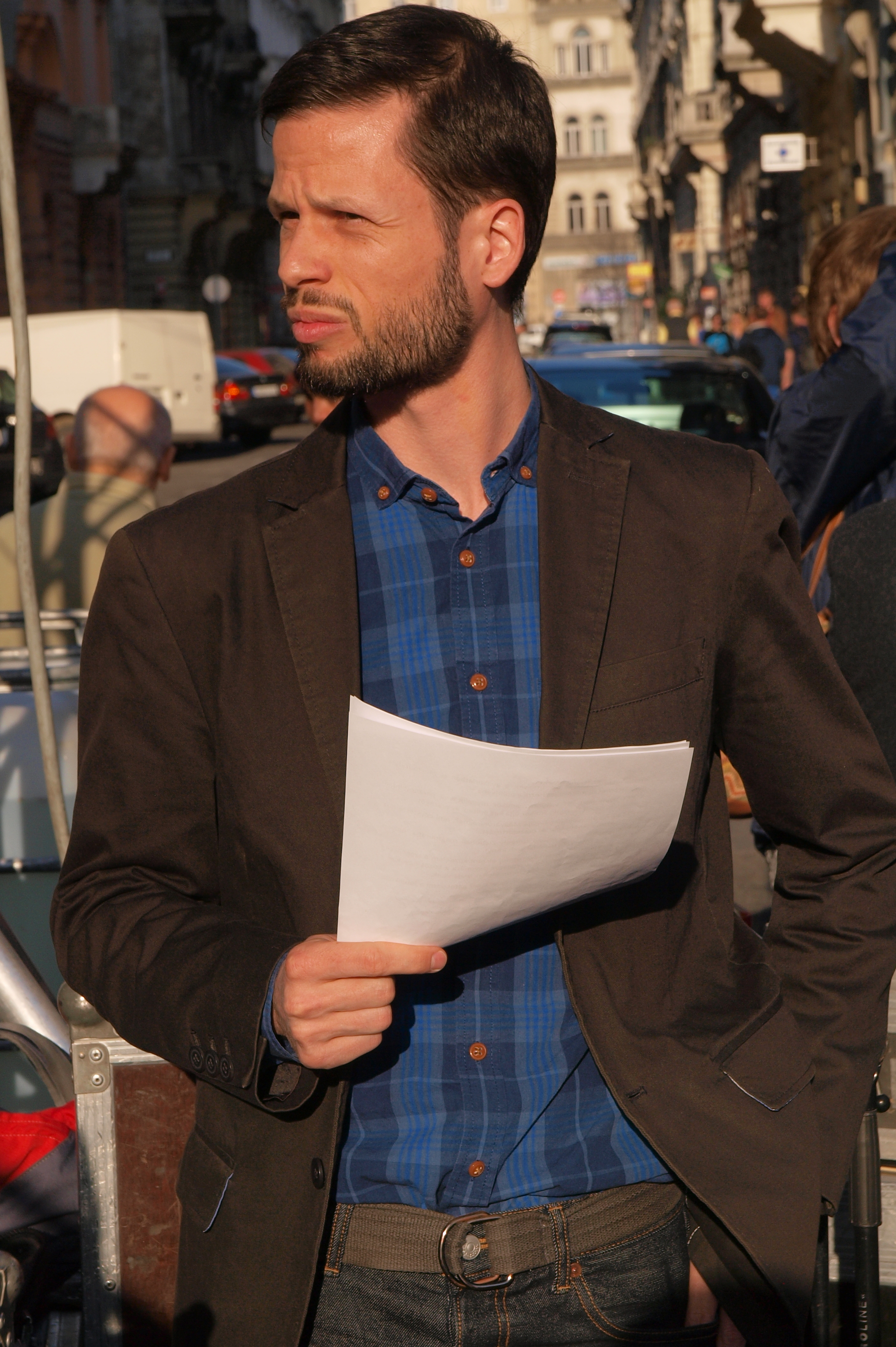
Tordai at a protest in 2015

In 2013, Tordai left LMP and became a member of the presidium of the newly formed Dialogue for Hungary, where he served as spokesperson between 2015 and 2018. In 2018, Tordai was elected Member of Parliament from the joint list of the MSZP–PM political alliance. He was deputy group leader of Dialogue during the 2018–2022 parliamentary cycle. He was a member of the Committee on Enterprise Development. Tordai also served as one of the recorders of the National Assembly from May 2018 to May 2022.

Several demonstrative actions can be linked to his name. After placing inscriptions on the door of Prime Minister Viktor Orbán's office in 2017, László Kövér, the Speaker of the National Assembly, banned him from the Parliament "eternally". After his election as MP – which thus overturned Kövér's punishment – Tordai omitted the formality in his inaugural speech to Prime Minister Viktor Orbán, then referred to him as "so-called" prime minister. Speaker László Kövér fined Tordai more than 8.2 million HUF in March 2021 for violating the house rules. Tordai asked Minister of Finance Mihály Varga to join a budget amendment motion while trying to record with his smartphone camera how Varga would react to the government's withdrawal of HUF 9.3 billion from the medical offices in the 2nd and 3rd district of Budapest. According to Varga, this provoked him and hindered him in his work.

Tordai defeated Olga Kálmán (DK) in the 2nd district of Budapest (Budapest 4th constituency) during the 2021 opposition primary, becoming candidate of the joint opposition alliance United for Hungary for the 2022 parliamentary election. Subsequently, Tordai defeated Fidesz candidate Csaba Gór, obtaining the parliamentary seat. Tordai was elected leader of the parliamentary group of Dialogue in May 2022, replacing Tímea Szabó. He also became a member of the parliament's Economic Committee. Tordai was elected co-leader of the party, alongside Rebeka Szabó in July 2022. As a result, he was replaced by caucus leader by Tímea Szabó in September 2022. Tordai was succeeded as co-leader of the party by Richárd Barabás in February 2024. Simultaneously, Tordai was re-elected leader of the party's parliamentary group, again succeeding Tímea Szabó.

Tordai left Dialogue on 9 June 2024, the day of the 2024 European Parliament election right after voting is closed, because he disagreed with the formation of the DK–MSZP–Dialogue Alliance. He announced that he will continue his work as an independent representative in the National Assembly. Despite that, he – a non-partisan – remained leader of the Dialogue parliamentary group to avoid its dissolution according to house rules. He initially run as MP again, but – despite his critics against their candidate Áron Koncz – withdrew his candidacy in favor of Tisza Party during the 2026 Hungarian parliamentary election.

National Assembly of Hungary
Preceded by Tímea Szabó	Leader of the PM parliamentary group 2022	Succeeded by Tímea Szabó
Preceded by Tímea Szabó	Leader of the PM parliamentary group 2024–2026	Succeeded by position abolished
Party political offices
Preceded by Tímea Szabó; Gergely Karácsony	Co-President of Dialogue for Hungary; 2022–2024; Served alongside: Rebeka Szabó	Succeeded by Rebeka Szabó; Richárd Barabás
