= Gábor Pósfai =

Hungarian politician (born 1982)

- Pósfai in 2026

Minister of Interior
- Incumbent
- Assumed office 13 May 2026
- Prime Minister: Péter Magyar
- Preceded by: Sándor Pintér

Member of the National Assembly
- Incumbent
- Assumed office 9 May 2026
- Preceded by: Tamás Menczer
- Constituency: Pest County 2nd

Personal details
- Born: 19 April 1982 (age 44)
- Party: TISZA

Gábor Pósfai (born 19 April 1982) is a Hungarian politician who was elected member of the National Assembly in 2026. He has served as chief operating officer of the Tisza Party since 2025.
