= Óbuda scandal =

2026 corruption scandal in Budapest, Hungary

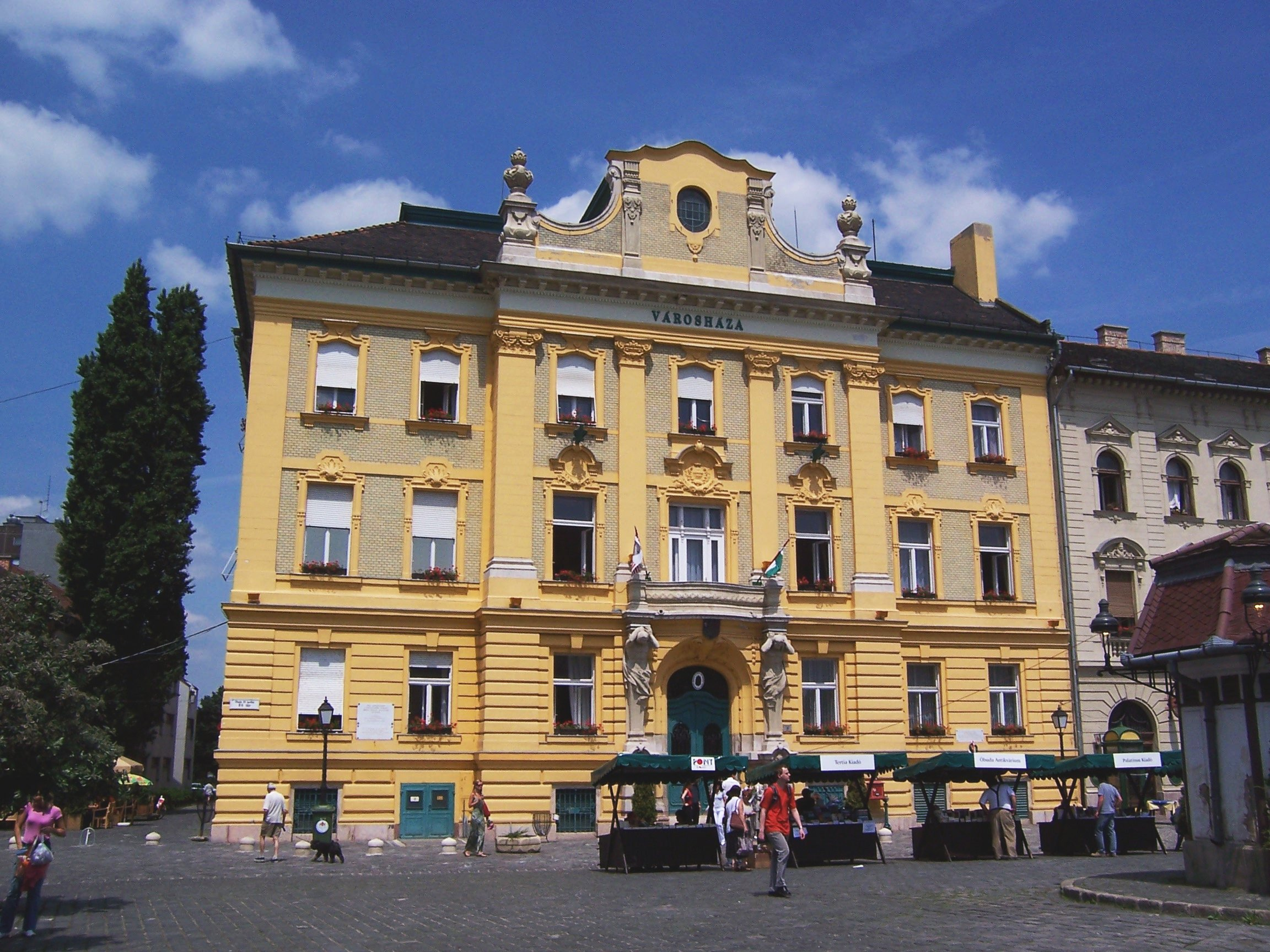
Óbuda town hall. The alleged recipients of kickbacks were politicians from Óbuda.

The Óbuda scandal (Hungarian: Óbudai korrupciós ügy, lit. 'Óbuda corruption scandal') is an ongoing political and corruption scandal in Hungary involving bribes and kickbacks received by politicians in the Óbuda-Békásmegyer district of Budapest between 2006 and 2024. The scandal involves former Hungarian Socialist Party politicians László Kiss and Gergő Czeglédy, Fidesz politicians Balázs Bús and Péter Puskás and local businessman Zsolt Z., (Note: Zsolt Z.'s full name is unknown due to Hungarian privacy laws restricting the release of names of criminal suspects.) who obtained kickbacks from maintenance of parks and city properties and bribed politicians from throughout Budapest to increase the amount of tenders procured. The network of individuals who are suspected of taking bribes includes 32 people as of 5 June 2026.

== Background ==
Óbuda-Békásmegyer is a district of Budapest, the capital and largest city of Hungary. Between 2013 and 2023, Pannon Park Forest Kft. won billions of Hungarian forints in contracts for routine maintenance of parks and city properties in the district.

In the 2019 Hungarian local elections, Fidesz was defeated by opposition parties in Budapest. László Kiss, an opposition politician, was elected as mayor of Óbuda-Békásmegyer. Kiss was arrested in 2024 on corruption charges and spent nine months in prison before being released. Kiss has claimed that his arrest was politically-motivated by the government of Hungary under the second premiership of Viktor Orbán, which sought to arrest popular left-wing politicians and damage the credibility of opposition mayor of Budapest Gergely Karácsony.

Zsolt Z., the owner of Pannon Park Forest Kft., was also arrested in the 2024 corruption scandal that led to Kiss's arrest. In an unsuccessful effort to secure an agreement from the Chief Prosecutor's Office of Investigations, Zsolt Z. named several left-wing politicians as co-conspirators in May 2024. He subsequently revised his claims in October 2024 to include Fidesz politicians, claiming that a member of the National Assembly had told him through an intermediary that his sentence would be reduced if he agreed to not name Fidesz politicians in his testimony.

As part of an agreement with the Chief Prosecutor's Office, former Óbuda deputy mayor from the Hungarian Socialist Party (Hungarian: Magyar Szocialista Párt, abbreviated MSZP) Gergő Czeglédy turned state's evidence following his 2024 arrest on corruption charges. The Chief Prosecutor determined that Czeglédy's claims matched those of Zsolt Z. and concluded that there was a widespread corruption network involving members of both the left and right. As a result, an investigation was launched.

== Scandal ==
In early June 2026, several individuals involved in the scandal were arrested. As of 5 June 2026, 32 individuals from across Budapest are suspected of taking €6 million worth of bribes from Zsolt Z. by the Chief Prosecutor's Office of Investigations, and eight are in pre-trial detention. Prominent arrests include Gergely Őrsi (mayor of the 2nd district of Budapest), Zsolt Láng (former mayor of the 2nd district), Péter Puskás (deputy mayor of Óbuda and chairman of Fidesz's Óbuda branch), Tünder Szkaliczki (former member of Óbuda municipal council for the Momentum Movement), Károly Matisz (former member of Óbuda municipal council for the Momentum Movement) and former MSZP Member of the National Assembly Zsolt Molnár.

Czeglédy's 2024 claims were first published by independent news outlet Telex.hu on 6 July 2026. Czeglédy created and managed KBT Kft., a subcontractor formally led by another individual, that was paid for maintenance projects in the district. He initially shared the kickbacks from KBT with Kiss, later involving other local politicians from Fidesz. Czeglédy claimed that the MSZP and Fidesz in Óbuda first agreed to share the profits of kickbacks in 2006. After the 2014 local elections and the election of Balázs Bús as mayor of Óbuda-Békásmegyer, Czeglédy alleged he was contacted by deputy mayor Péter Puskás (from Fidesz), who approached him questioning the possibility of receiving kickbacks from maintenance in Óbuda-Békásmegyer. Zsolt Z. likewise describes Puskás as reaching out to him requesting kickbacks. They were later joined by Zsolt Z., who claimed to have assisted in rewriting the procurement process by including several technical details in order to prevent other companies from being involved in procurement. The group began establishing ratio of the kickbacks was initially 70–30 in favour of Fidesz; following Fidesz's defeat in the 2019 local elections, the ratio was reversed, with 70% of profits going to the MSZP.

== Reactions ==
Bús denied any involvement in the scandal, saying that he was unaware of the company or its operations.

Gergely Karácsony, mayor of Budapest, has described the alleged bribes given to secure tenders as "the biggest waste of money in the world", citing his 2022 decision to no longer outsource maintenance of green spaces to private companies.

Prime minister Péter Magyar condemned the scandal, accusing Fidesz and the MSZP of forming a "grand coalition" to engage in corruption.
