= Zsolt Láng =

Hungarian politician (born 1973)

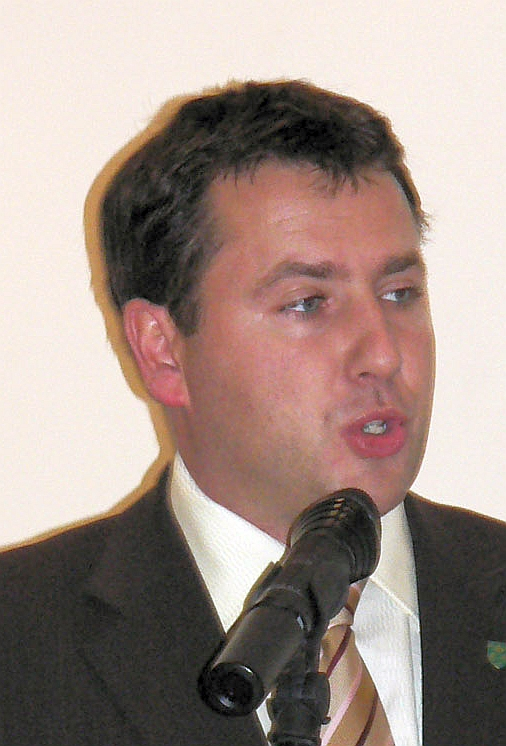

Member of the National Assembly
- Incumbent
- Assumed office 2 May 2022
- In office 14 May 2010 – 5 May 2014

Mayor of District II, Budapest
- In office 1 October 2006 – 13 October 2019
- Preceded by: Csaba Horváth
- Succeeded by: Gergely Őrsi

Personal details
- Born: 4 April 1973 (age 53) Budapest, Hungary
- Party: Fidesz (since 1990)
- Profession: politician

Zsolt Láng (born April 4, 1973) is a Hungarian politician and member of the National Assembly (MP) from 2010 to 2014 and since 2022. He served as the mayor of the 2nd district of Budapest from 2006 to 2019. He is a member of the right-wing Fidesz.

== Profession ==
Zsolt Láng was born into an intellectual family in Budapest on 4 April 1973. He attended Kodály Zoltán Primary School of Music in Marczibányi Square. He finished his secondary studies at Toldy Ferenc Gymnasium in 1991. He graduated from the College of Public Administration (present-day a faculty of the National University of Public Service) in 1995 as an administrative organizer, and in 2000 he graduated cum laude from the Faculty of Law of the Eötvös Loránd University (ELTE).

Between 1995 and 2006, he managed the Hungarian office of an international shipping company, during which time he obtained an international IATA agent qualification in 2003.

== Political career ==
Láng joined Fidesz in 1990. He worked as an expert for the education, culture and sports committee of the local government of the 2nd district between 1994 and 1998. He was elected a member of the representative body of the 2nd district in the 1998 local elections. He was re-elected during the 2002 local elections. He functioned as deputy leader of the local caucus of Fidesz–MKDSZ. He was the chairman of the Economic and Ownership Committee, and member of the legal, administrative and procedural committee, and member of the board of trustees of the 2nd District Public Security Foundation. He was appointed president of the local Fidesz branch in the 2nd district in 2001. After re-organization of the party structure, Láng became leader of the Fidesz in the local constituency in 2004. Zsolt Láng currently has been president of the Budapest branch of Fidesz.

Láng was elected mayor of the 2nd district in the 2006 local elections, defeating MSZP politician Csaba Horváth. He was re-elected in 2010 and 2014, defeated with great superiority socialist politicians Zsolt Molnár and Csaba Horváth, respectively. During the 2010 parliamentary election he was elected Member of Parliament from the Fidesz's Budapest regional list. He was the party's candidate at the District II of Budapest by-election in November 2011 (following the resignation of István Balsai). He came first with 58.45 percent before Katalin Lévai (MSZP) and Gergely Karácsony (LMP). After that Láng represented the 2nd district in the National Assembly of Hungary until 2014. He was a member of the Municipal and Regional Development Committee from 2010 to 2014. He had presided that committee since 2011. He was also a member of the Ad hoc Preparatory Committee for the Constitution from 2010 to 2011. He served as president of the Association of Budapest Municipalities from September 2012 to November 2013.

During the 2019 local elections, Láng was defeated by MSZP politician Gergely Őrsi as Mayor of the 2nd district. Nevertheless, he was elected to the General Assembly of Budapest, where he became leader of the Fidesz caucus. He served in this capacity until the 2022 parliamentary election, when he was elected a Member of Parliament and was succeeded by Zsolt Wintermantel. Láng became a member of the parliament's committee on legislation. Minister Tibor Navracsics appointed him government commissioner responsible for the economic development of Central Hungary (including Budapest) in May 2022.

Láng was arrested on 4 June 2026 and accused of taking bribes as part of the Óbuda scandal.
