= Áron Koncz =

Hungarian politician

Member of the National Assembly
- Assuming office 9 May 2026
- Succeeding: Bence Tordai
- Constituency: Budapest 4th

Personal details
- Party: TISZA

Áron Koncz is a Hungarian politician who was elected member of the National Assembly in 2026. He previously worked in the tourism industry.
