= István Mikola =

Hungarian physician and politician

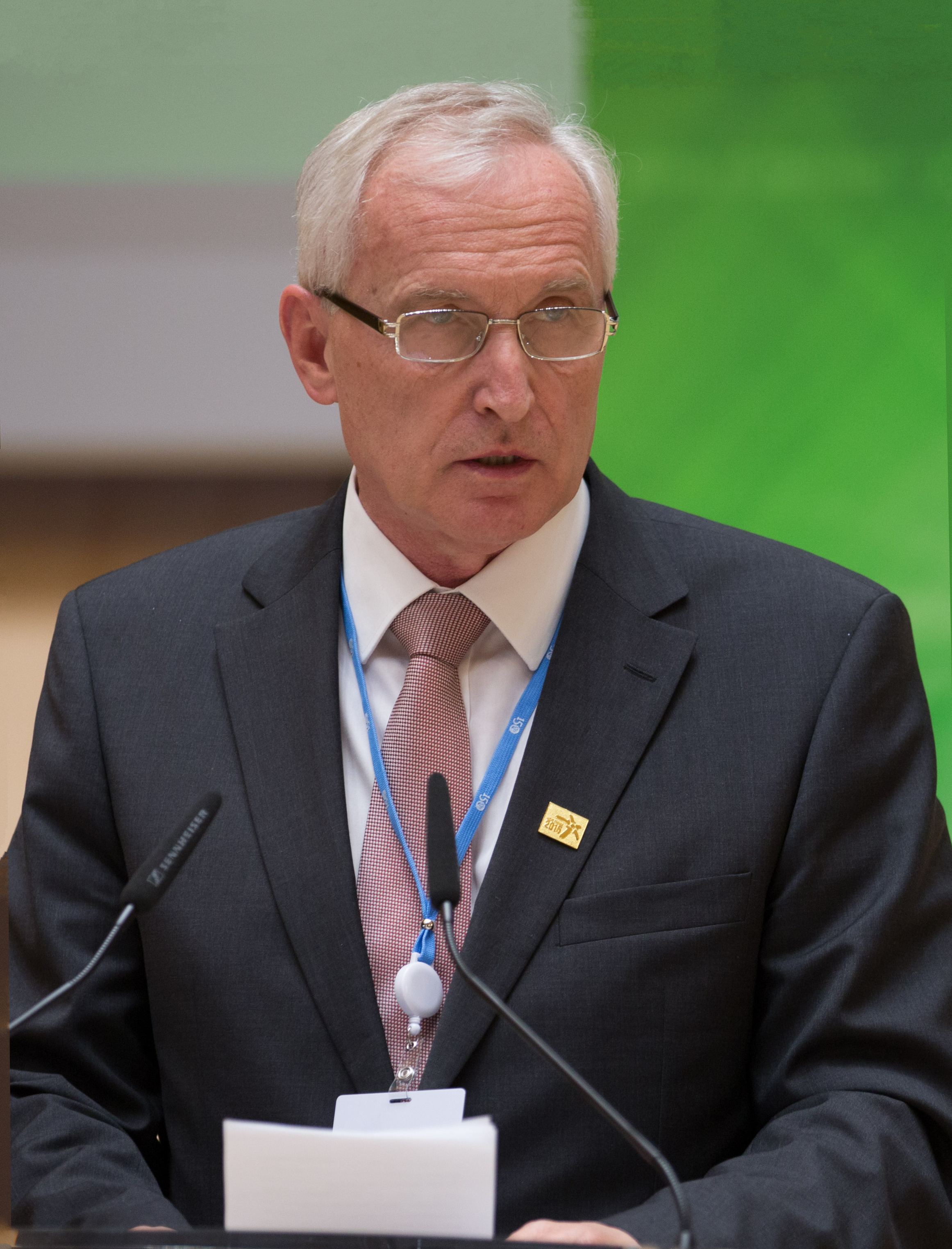

Minister of Health
- In office 1 January 2001 – 27 May 2002
- Prime Minister: Viktor Orbán
- Preceded by: Árpád Gógl
- Succeeded by: Judit Csehák

Personal details
- Born: 8 September 1947 (age 78) Veszprém, Hungary
- Party: Fidesz (since 2003)
- Other political affiliations: KDNP
- Children: 5
- Profession: physician, ambassador to the OECD

Dr. István Mikola (born 8 September 1947) is a Hungarian physician and politician, who served as Minister of Health in the first cabinet of Viktor Orbán, between 2001 and 2002. He was also Member of Parliament from Fidesz Fejér County Regional List between 2006 and 2011. Mikola was nominated to the position of Deputy Prime Minister during the 2006 parliamentary election.

He was appointed Hungarian Ambassador to the Organisation for Economic Co-operation and Development (OECD), as a result he resigned as MP on 28 February 2011. He was replaced by Gábor Cserna. Mikola became Secretary of State for Security Policy and International Cooperation in the Third Orbán Government on 15 June 2014. He held the position until 17 May 2018.

Mikola was Hungarian Ambassador to Australia from 2018 to 2022. He was replaced by fellow Fidesz politician Zsolt Csenger-Zalán. Mikola was also the Hungarian Ambassador to Papua New Guinea, Solomon Islands and Vanuatu until 2022.

== Personal life ==
He is married and has five children.

Diplomatic posts
| Preceded by Attila Gruber | Hungarian Ambassador to Australia; 2018–2022 | Succeeded by Zsolt Csenger-Zalán |
