= Római Part (Roman Beach) =

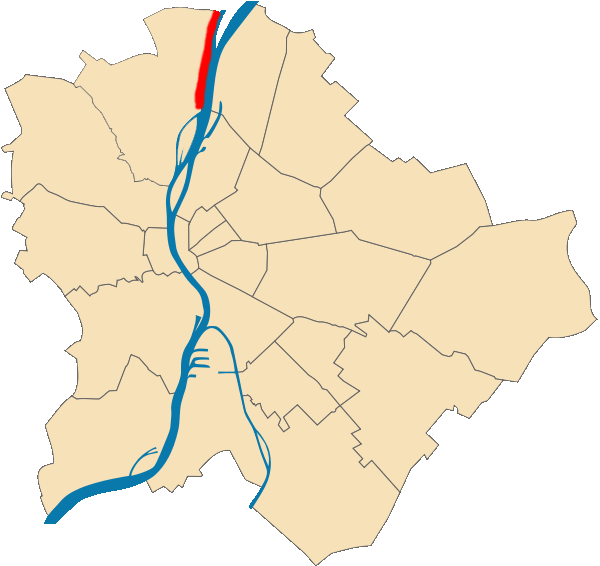
- Location of Római Part in Budapest. Coordinates: 47.570652°N 19.0650129°E

The Római Part (also referred to as Római-Part; common English translations: Roman Beach, Roman Coast, or Roman Riverbank) is a riverside beach in the capital of Hungary, Budapest. It is located at an approximately 5 kilometers long stretch along the Danube riverside of the city's North-Western 3rd district (Óbuda-Békásmegyer).
It is well known among inhabitants - and increasingly among tourists - as a local recreational area, natural reserve, water sports facility, and - predominantly between spring and fall - a popular entertainment area with numerous open air gastronomic facilities and bars.

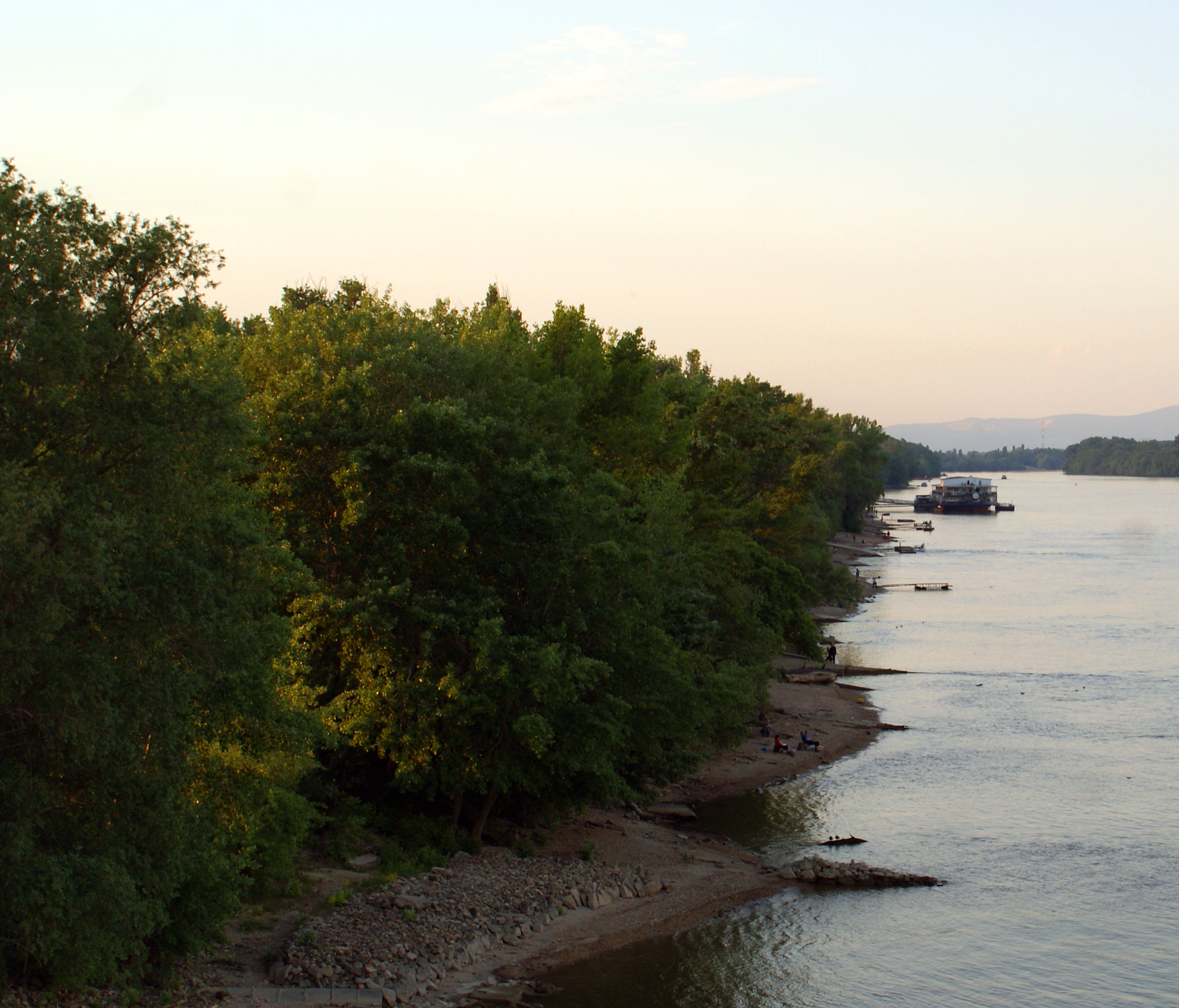
Római Part Danube riverside

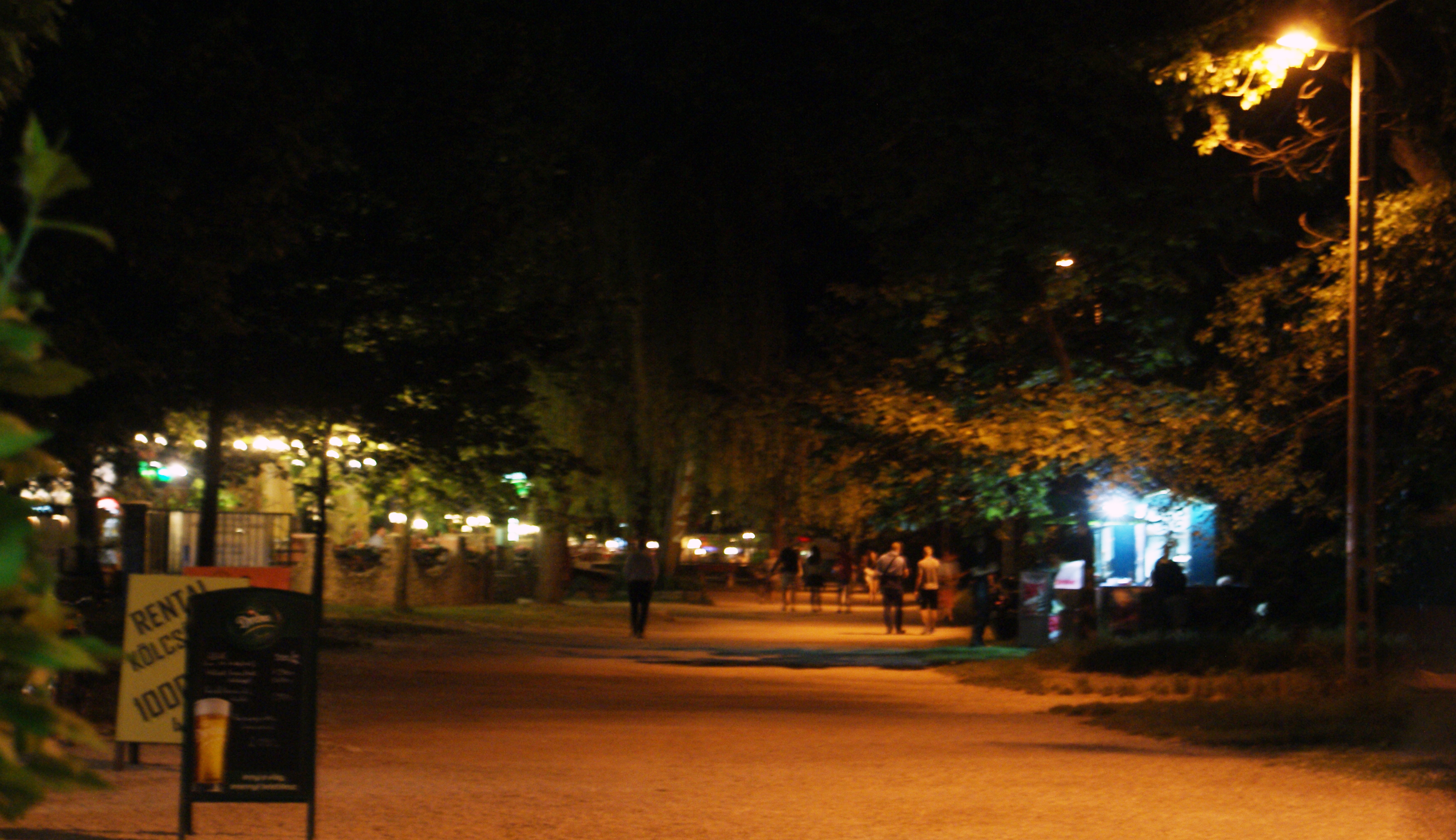
Római Part promenade at night

== Location and Directions ==
The name Római Part refers both to the riverside beach and the walking and cycling promenade that lies behind, stretching from the Barát-patak creek estuary in the north to the Aranhegyi-patak creek estuary in the south. The area is well connected to public transport. It is served by 3 local bus lines (lines 34, 106, and night bus 934), the central bus stop being Nimród utca. It can also easily be reached by suburban railway (HÉV), via the stop Rómaifürdő. There are also several parking lots for cars available. A BKV ferry boat stops at boat station Rómaifürdő on a regular basis (lines D11 and D12). Furthermore, the riverside promenade is part of the EuroVelo 6 international bicycle route, lying in a section that connects Budapest with the northbound village of Szentendre.

== Sports and Recreation ==
Historically, the area has been a center for boating sports, such as kayak and canoeing already since the 19th century. As a consequence, many boat houses are nowadays located along the river in this area. The promenade, which is lined by many trees, is a popular destination among runners and cyclists. It is also a popular walking area for families with children and dogs. Moreover, the Római Part hosts a number of sports facilities, a Pétanque pitch, and a bowling center.

== Gastronomy ==
Along the promenade and the riverside several bars, restaurants, and food trucks are located. Most of these venues open in spring and close only during wintertime, with some of them being open all year long. Many food venues offer popular Hungarian street food, such as "Hekk" (fried hake fish), "Langos" (fried dough), or "Sült kolbász" (fried sausage). Due to this gastronomic culture, combined with the natural setting and the riverside in vicinity, the Római Part is also referred to by some as "the capital's lake Balaton coast".

== Debate on Mobile Dam ==
In 2013, the Budapest city council decided to order the construction of a mobile dam at the Római Part, in order to protect the area from flooding. In the past, the Római Part and parts of the 3rd district's residential area that lies beneath have been flooded repeatedly. Since the city council decision, there has been a long debate about the type and location of the planned dam. The benefits and effectiveness of this specific flood protection are highly contested. Criticism is formulated by several local inhabitants and organizations, who emphasize several issues with the plan. One problem of the current mobile dam plan is that it would make it necessary to cut down approximately 1500 trees on the shoreline and result in an environmental disaster for the wildlife of the area. Another problem is the soil condition on the riverside, which would only lead to a fragile flood protection and endanger the entire neighborhood in case of breach during an actual flood. An alternative flood protection measure - which is also supported by most critics of the current plan and many local inhabitants - would be to construct a dam further away from the embankment at Nánási street and Királyok street. Supporters of the mobile dam plan include local property owners, who have an interest in higher property values through complete flood protection of the neighborhood. As a consequence of the debate and widespread opposition against the city council plans, the implementation of the dam construction works is still pending, and alternative solutions are still in discussion.
