= Balázs Bús =

Hungarian politician

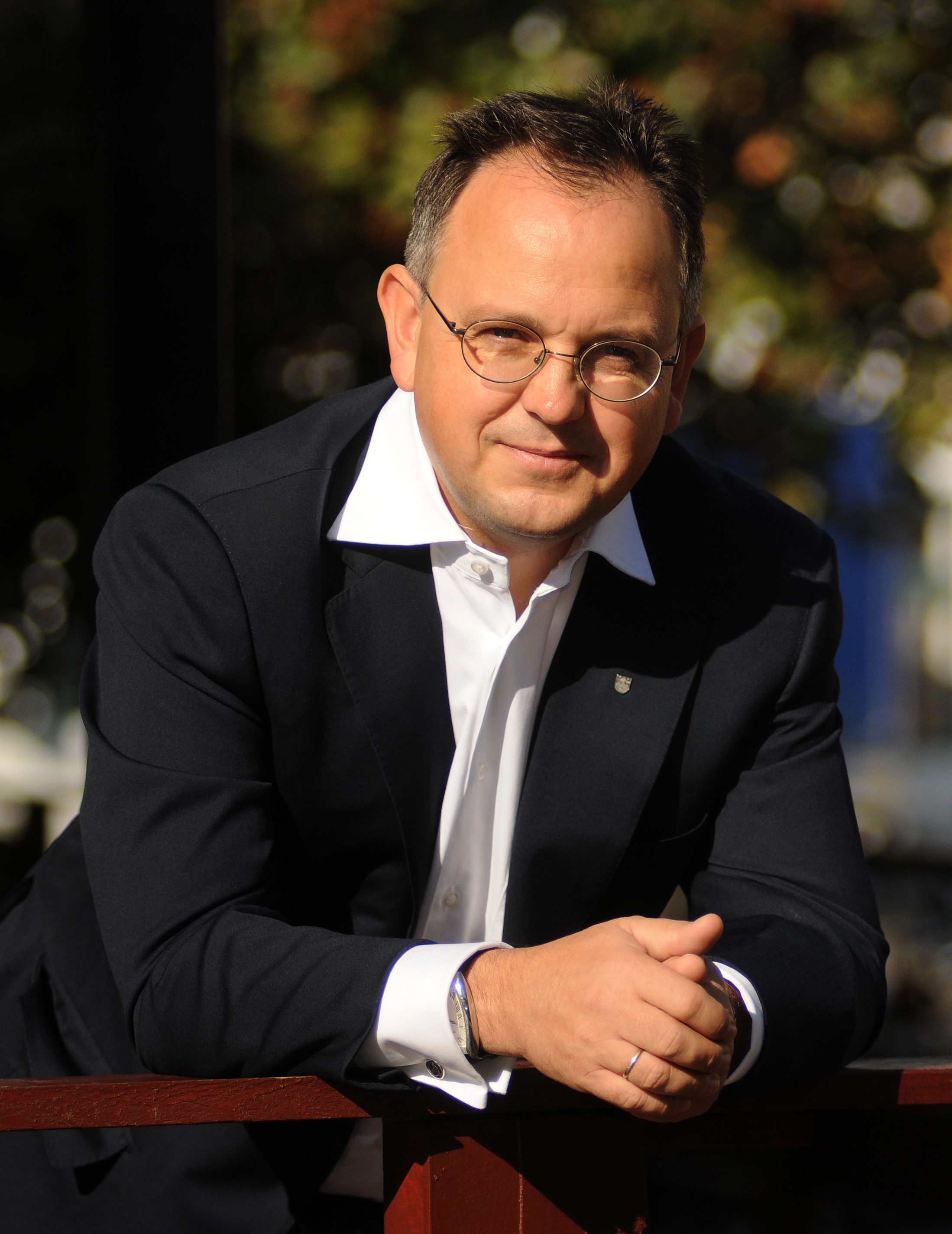
- Bús in 2012

Member of the National Assembly
- In office 14 May 2010 – 5 May 2014
- Constituency: Budapest 4th

Mayor of Óbuda-Békásmegyer
- In office 1 October 2006 – 13 October 2019
- Preceded by: István Tarlós
- Succeeded by: László Kiss

Personal details
- Born: 29 January 1966 (age 60) Budapest, Hungary
- Party: Fidesz (since 1988)
- Spouse: Edina Vég
- Children: Benedek Álmos Bús
- Profession: politician

Balázs Bús (born 29 January 1966) is a Hungarian Fidesz politician who served as a member of the National Assembly from 2010 to 2014, representing Óbuda-Békásmegyer (Budapest 4th constituency). He previously served as mayor of Óbuda-Békásmegyer, Budapest's 3rd district, from 2006 to 2019.

Bús was deputy head of the National Cultural Fund of Hungary (Hungarian: Nemzeti Kulturális Alap, NKA) during the 2026 Hungarian parliamentary election. During the election, the NKA distributed 17 billion forints, including to groups close to Fidesz. Following Fidesz's defeat in the election, Bús was arrested on 23 June 2026 on corruption charges. Former Óbuda-Békásmegyer deputy mayor Gergő Czeglédy has also accused Bús of overseeing the beginning of the Óbuda scandal, in which politicians from Óbuda-Békásmegyer received kickbacks and bribes. Bús has denied involvement in the Óbuda scandal.
