= Katalin Lévai =

Hungarian politician

Katalin Lévai (born 22 May 1954 in Budapest) is a Hungarian politician and Member of the European Parliament for the Hungarian Socialist Party, part of the Party of European Socialists.

Lévai is a maverick and social-liberal politician who is willing to use bombastic statements to draw attention to the social and equality issues. In 2003 was named the first minister without portfolio for equal opportunities, and was termed the 'Conscience of the Government'. In 2005 she became a presidential candidate in Hungary. Due to 'inside issues' the left government in place managed to vote a right wing president, thus her aspirations were unsuccessful.

She is a supporter of same-sex marriage in Hungary. She also works to mainstream gender equality issues, for removing obstacles – physical and mental as well – that hinder disabled people in accessing social services as equal citizens, and for effective measures ensuring the social integration of Roma people in Hungary and in the region.

Besides the active participation in the legislation process of the European Union, Lévai initiated several practical projects that offer direct services to the citizens and contribute to a more inclusive society in Hungary: the first Hungarian crisis-intervention centre was established for the victims of violence and the network of „Houses of Chances” is being built in all regions of Hungary with the aim of co-ordinating local services to the citizens (direct social assistance, legal aid, mental help, etc.)

Newly, Katalin Lévai is also known as a writer. She is the author of several books, publications in the past on her professional work, in November 2007 her third semi-fiction has been published, selling well on the Hungarian market.

She was the party's candidate at the District II of Budapest by-election in November 2011. She came second with 30.55 percent after Zsolt Láng (Fidesz).

In September 2017, Katalin Lévai and György Földényi, the President of the National Representative Body of Pensioners founded a new political party For Hungary With Vigour (Hungarian: Lendülettel Magyarországért) to work for the interests of pensioners, and the party mainly focuses on issues related to health care, taxes and pensioners' issues.

Lévai lives between Brussels and Budapest. She has a daughter, herself a journalist, Nóra Lakos.
