= Krisztián Kulcsár =

Hungarian fencer (born 1971)

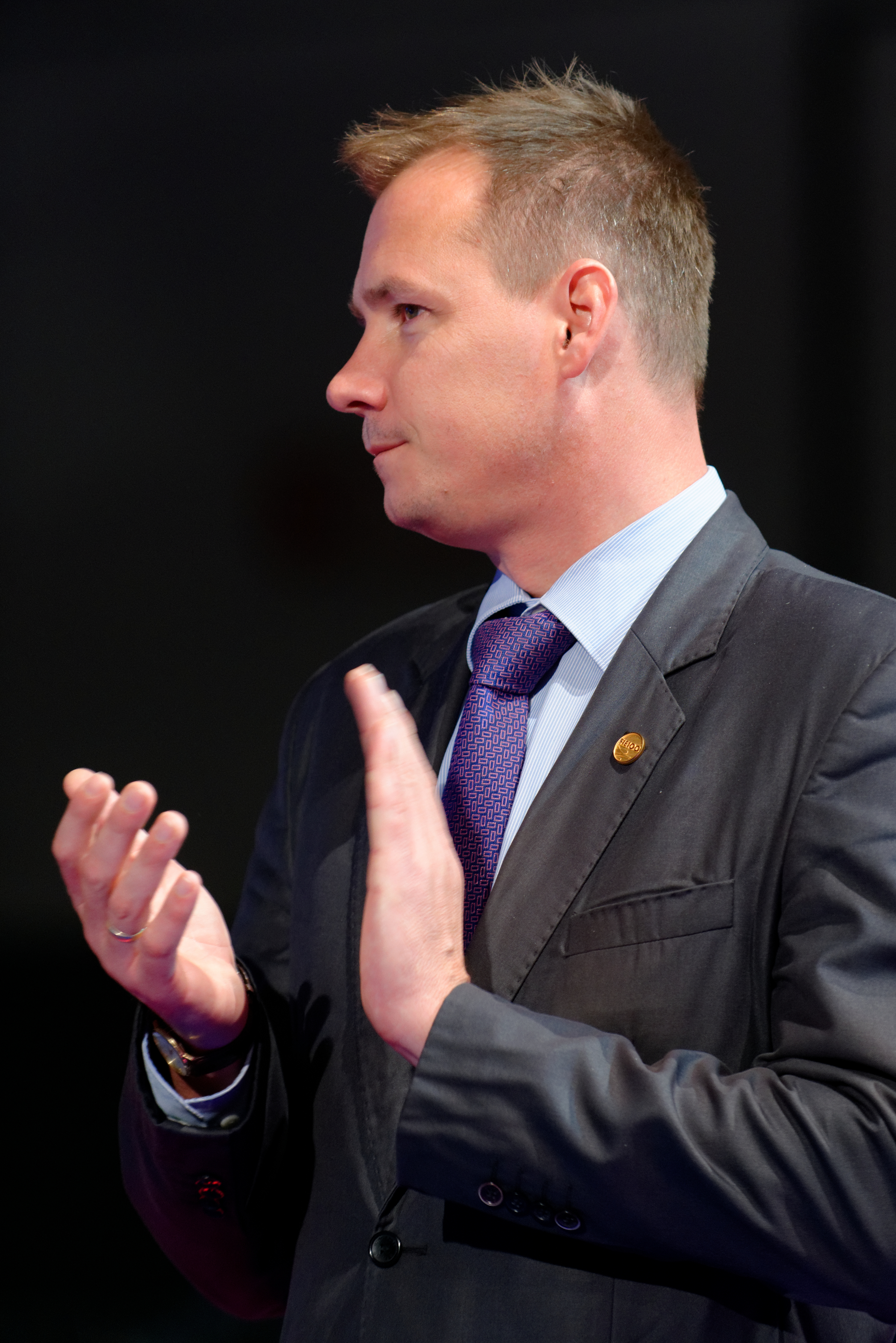
- At the 2013 World Fencing Championships in Budapest

Personal information
- Born: 28 June 1971 (age 55) Budapest, Hungary

Sport
- Sport: Fencing
- Club: Bp. Honvéd
Medal record
Representing Hungary
Olympic Games
Silver medal – second place	1992 Barcelona	Team epée
Silver medal – second place	2004 Athens	Team epée
World Championships
Gold medal – first place	1998 La Chaux-de-Fonds	Team épée
Gold medal – first place	2001 Nîmes	Team épée
Gold medal – first place	2007 St Petersburg	Individual epée
Bronze medal – third place	1995 The Hague	Team épée
Bronze medal – third place	2007 St Petersburg	Team épée
Summer Universiade
Gold medal – first place	1995 Fukuoka	Team épée
Silver medal – second place	1993 Buffalo	Individual épée
Silver medal – second place	1993 Buffalo	Team épée

Krisztián Kulcsár (born 28 June 1971) is a Hungarian fencer and politician. He has won two Olympic silver medals in the team épée competition. He became world champion in 2007. As of 2013, he is deputy chairman of the Hungarian Fencing Federation. He was elected member of the National Assembly in 2026 representing the Budapest 10th constituency. Kulcsár has a university degree in Economics and Law. In his private life, he is married with two daughters and one son.

Kulcsár was elected President of the Hungarian Olympic Committee (MOB) on 2 May 2017, replacing Zsolt Borkai. The general assembly of MOB withdrew confidence from Kulcsár on 30 December 2021. Therefore, Kulcsár resigned from his position with effect from 31 January 2022.

== Awards ==
- Member of the Hungarian team of year: 1998
- National Defence awards, II.class (1998)
- Hungarian Fencer of the Year (1): 2007

Orders and special awards

- Cross of Merit of the Republic of Hungary – Silver Cross (1992)
- Order of Merit of the Republic of Hungary – Knight's Cross (2004)

Sporting positions
Preceded by Zsolt Borkai	President of the Hungarian Olympic Committee; 2017–2022	Succeeded by Zsolt Gyulay
