= Rebeka Szabó =

Hungarian politician (born 1977)

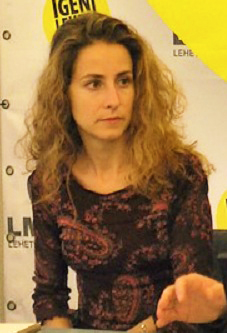
- Szabó circa 2010

Member of the National Assembly
- In office 14 May 2010 – 5 May 2014
- Incumbent
- Assumed office 2 May 2022

Personal details
- Born: 20 November 1977 (age 48) Budapest, Hungary
- Party: LMP (2009–2013); PM (2013–present)
- Profession: biologist, ecologist

Rebeka Katalin Szabó (born 20 November 1977) is a Hungarian biologist, ecologist and politician, member of the National Assembly (MP) from Politics Can Be Different (LMP) National List between 2010 and 2014, and again from Dialogue – The Greens' Party since 2022.

== Education ==
She earned a degree in biology at Faculty of Science of the Eötvös Loránd University.

== Political career ==
She was a founding member of the LMP party between 2009 and 2013. She was elected to the National Assembly from the party's National List during the 2010 Hungarian parliamentary election. She had been a member of the Committee on Agriculture between 14 May 2010 and 11 February 2013. She became a member of the Committee of National Cohesion on 25 February 2013.

In January 2013, the LMP's congress rejected against the electoral cooperation with other opposition forces, including Together 2014. As a result members of LMP’s “Dialogue for Hungary” platform, including Rebeka Szabó, announced their decision to leave the opposition party and form a new organization. Benedek Jávor said he eight MPs leaving LMP would keep their parliamentary mandates. The leaving MPs established Dialogue for Hungary as a full-fledged party.

In November 2014, Szabó was elected to the Zugló council, where she became Deputy Mayor.

In April 2022, Szabó was elected member of the Hungarian National Assembly from the coalition list of United for Hungary, once Gergely Karácsony resigned his seat from the list.

Szabó was elected co-leader of the Dialogue for Hungary, alongside Bence Tordai in July 2022.

Party political offices
Preceded by Tímea Szabó; Gergely Karácsony	Co-President of Dialogue for Hungary; 2022– Served alongside: Bence Tordai (2022–2024); Richárd Barabás (2024– )	Incumbent
