= 2nd district of Budapest =

2nd District of Budapest Budapest II. kerülete
- District of Budapest
- District II
- Flag Coat of arms

- Location of District II in Budapest (shown in grey)
- Coordinates: 47°31′20″N 19°01′25″E
- Country: Hungary
- Region: Central Hungary
- City: Budapest
- Established: 17 November 1873
- Quarters: List: Adyliget; Budakeszierdő; Budaliget; Csatárka; Erzsébetliget; Erzsébettelek; Felhévíz; Gercse; Hársakalja; Hárshegy; Hűvösvölgy; Kővár; Kurucles; Lipótmező; Máriaremete; Nyék; Országút; Pálvölgy; Pasarét; Pesthidegkút-Ófalu; Petneházyrét; Remetekertváros; Rézmál; Rózsadomb; Szemlőhegy; Széphalom; Szépilona; Szépvölgy; Törökvész; Újlak; Vérhalom; Víziváros; Zöldmál

Government
  - Mayor: Gergely Őrsi (Ind.)

Area
  - Total: 36.34 km^{2} (14.03 sq mi)
  - Rank: 5th

Population (2016)
  - Total: 89,903
  - Rank: 7th
  - Density: 2,474/km^{2} (6,407/sq mi)
- Demonym: második kerületi ("2nd districter")
- Time zone: UTC+1 (CET)
  - Summer (DST): UTC+2 (CEST)
- Postal code: 1021 ... 1029
- Website: www.masodikkerulet.hu

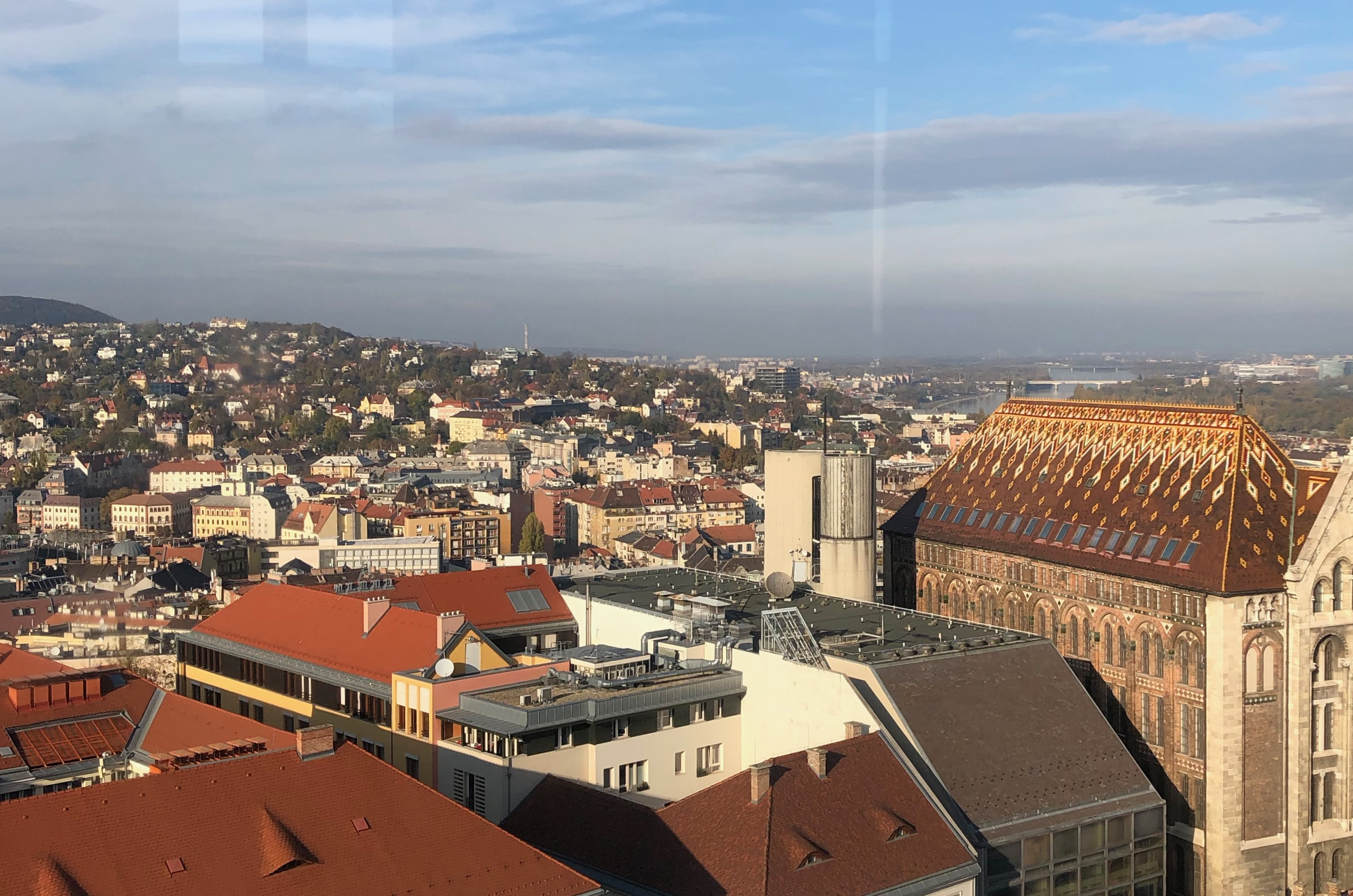
Budapest II from Buda tower

The 2nd district of Budapest (hu) is a district of Budapest, Hungary. It has an area of 36.34 km^{2} and is situated to the south of the 3rd district and to the north of the 1st district and the 12th district.

== Notable places ==
- Széll Kálmán tér, one of the city's biggest transport interchanges.
- Mammut shopping centre
- Central Statistical Office Library, one of the largest public libraries in Budapest
- Millenáris Park
- Church of Our Lady of Sarlós, a historic Roman Catholic church built in the 18th century

== Politics ==
The current mayor of the 2nd district is Gergely Őrsi (independent). Őrsi was arrested on 4 June 2026 and accused of taking bribes as part of the Óbuda scandal.

The District Assembly, elected at the 2019 local government elections, is made up of 21 members (1 Mayor, 14 Individual constituencies MEPs and 6 Compensation List MEPs) divided into this political parties and alliances:

Party	Seats	Current District Assembly
Opposition coalition (Note: Coalition of Momentum–DK–MSZP–Dialogue–LMP–Mindenki Magyarországa.)	12	M
Fidesz-KDNP	8	
MKKP	1	

=== List of mayors ===
Member	Party	Date
Gyula Póta	SZDSZ	1990–1998
György B. Bencze	Fidesz	1998–2002
Csaba Horváth	MSZP	2002–2006
Zsolt Láng	Fidesz	2006–2019
Gergely Őrsi	MSZP	2019–
Gergely Őrsi	Ind.	2019–

== Twin towns – sister cities ==
2nd district of Budapest is twinned with:

- Beşiktaş, Turkey
- Finike, Turkey
- Mosbach, Germany
- Żoliborz (Warsaw), Poland
