= Zsolt Csenger-Zalán =

Hungarian politician (born 1957)

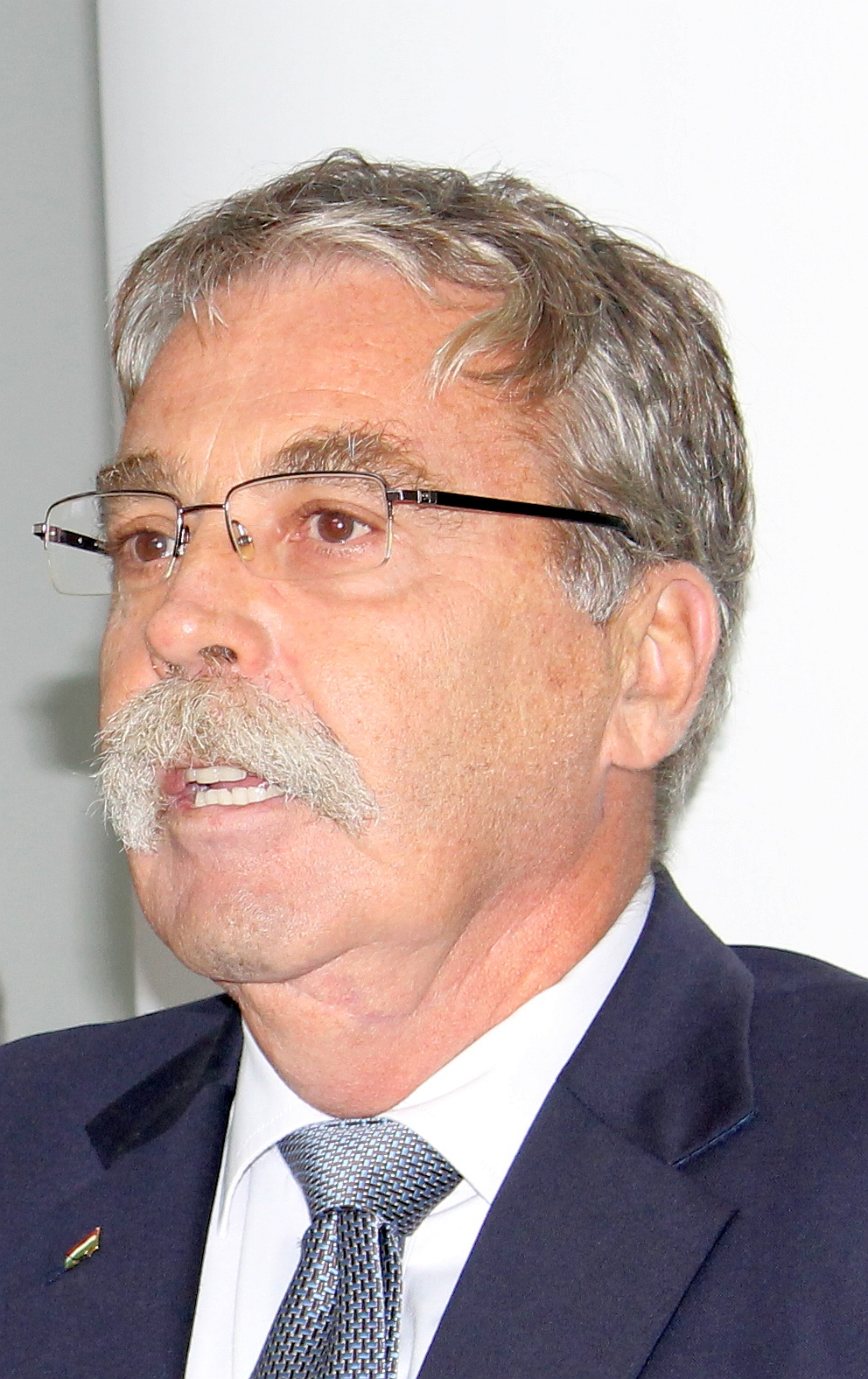

Member of the National Assembly
- In office 14 May 2010 – 1 May 2022
- Succeeded by: Tamás Menczer

Personal details
- Born: 22 August 1957 (age 68) Budapest, Hungary
- Party: Fidesz (2002– )
- Other political affiliations: MDF
- Spouse: Katalin Csenger-Zalán
- Children: Kincső; Zselyke
- Profession: politician

Zsolt Csenger-Zalán (born 22 August 1957) is a Hungarian chemical engineer, businessman, politician and diplomat, member of the National Assembly (MP) for Budaörs (Pest County Constituency IX) between 2010 and 2014, and for Budakeszi (Pest County Constituency II) from 2014 to 2022.

== Professional work ==
He finished his secondary studies at the Petrik Lajos Vocational School of Chemistry in 1975. He earned a degree of chemical engineer at the Budapest University of Technology (BME) in 1980. He took foreign trade examination in 1983 and advanced entrepreneurship qualification in 1988. He attended the University at Buffalo in 2004, obtaining MBA degree.

Csenger-Zalán worked as a design engineer for the Institute of Energy Management between 1980 and 1981, where he dealt with utilization and disposal of power plant waste materials in this capacity. Subsequently, he was a marketing lecturer at the Hungarian Optical Works (MOM). He was a sales representative of the Technoimpex foreign trade company in Nigeria and other countries in West Africa from 1983 to 1988. He was representative of the Berema AB. Swedish company in Hungary for a short time in 1989. At the end of the year, he founded his own company Scantrade Ltd., specializing in the distribution of construction machinery. He established Scantrade Recycling Ltd. in 1992, which was a distributor of German, Austrian and Italian recycling and waste processing machines in the Hungarian market.

== Political career ==
Csenger-Zalán was a founding member of the Hungarian Democratic Forum (MDF) in 1988. He was a member of the presidency of its District I–XII branch until 1991. He joined Fidesz in November 2002. He was appointed president of the party's branch in Constituency IX, Pest County (Budaörs) in January 2004. He was a councilor at the General Assembly of Pest County from 2006 to 2010.

He was elected a Member of Parliament for Budaörs in the 2010 parliamentary election. He was a member of the Committee on Foreign Affairs from 14 May 2010 to 1 May 2022, and a member of the Committee on National Security from 13 September 2010 to 5 May 2014. He served as mayor of Zsámbék between 2010 and 2014. He was elected MP for Budakeszi in the 2014 parliamentary election. He was appointed vice-chairman of the Committee on Foreign Affairs, holding that position until 2022. He was re-elected MP for Budakeszi in the 2018 parliamentary election, narrowly defeating Bernadett Szél, the co-chairperson of the Politics Can Be Different. Csenger-Zalán was also a member of the parliamentary assemblies of the Organization for Security and Co-operation in Europe (OSCE) and the Council of Europe.

Csenger-Zalán was replaced as Fidesz candidate in Budakeszi constituency by secretary of state Tamás Menczer, who ultimately defeated Bernadett Szél in the 2022 Hungarian parliamentary election. Simultaneously, Csenger-Zalán was appointed Hungarian Ambassador to Australia, replacing István Mikola.

== Personal life ==
He is married. His wife is Katalin Csenger-Zalán. They have two daughters, Kincső and Zselyke.

Diplomatic posts
Preceded by István Mikola	Hungarian Ambassador to Australia; 2022–	Succeeded by Incumbent
