= Attila Gruber =

Hungarian politician

Member of the National Assembly
- In office 15 May 2002 – 5 May 2014

Personal details
- Born: 6 November 1958 (age 67) Budapest, Hungary
- Party: Fidesz (since 2000)
- Spouse: Andrea Gruberné Kis-Pál
- Children: Johanna Alíz; Szandra Zora; Márk István; Léda Aisa
- Profession: lawyer, politician

Dr. Attila Gruber (born 6 November 1958) is a Hungarian jurist, politician and diplomat, member of the National Assembly (MP) for Siófok (Somogy County Constituency III) between 2002 and 2014.

== Career ==
Gruber graduated in law from the Janus Pannonius University in 1985. He began his political career as the mayor of Törökkoppány between 1990 and 1994. He was a member of the representative body of Siófok from 1995 to 2006.

Gruber was elected a Member of Parliament for Siófok three times, in 2002, 2006 and 2010. He was a member of the Committee on Tourism from May 2002 to May 2006. He was a member of the Committee on Foreign Affairs from 21 June 2004 to 5 May 2014. He was also a member of the Ad hoc Preparatory Committee for the Constitution from 2010 to 2011 and of the Committee on Constitutional Affairs, Judiciary and Procedure from 2011 to 2014. Gruber was an observer to the European Parliament from 2003 to 2004. He was briefly a delegated member in the period between Hungary's join to the European Union and the first 2004 European Parliament election in Hungary, as part of the European People's Party – European Democrats (EPP–ED).

Mihály Witzmann defeated him in the Fidesz branch leadership election in Siófok in January 2013, therefore Witzmann automatically became the party's candidate in Siófok constituency for the upcoming 2014 Hungarian parliamentary election, ending Gruber's parliamentary career after twelve years. Gruber became Hungarian Ambassador to Australia on 15 March 2015. He was also accredited to New Zealand, Papua New Guinea and Tonga. He was replaced by fellow Fidesz politician István Mikola in the autumn of 2018. Gruber contested the 2019 Hungarian local elections to become mayor of Siófok as candidate of the Fidesz, but he was defeated by the non-partisan Róbert Lengyel.

== Personal life ==
He was married to Andrea Gruberné Kis-Pál. They have three children together and the youngest from Katalin Handó journalist

Diplomatic posts
Preceded by Anna Sikó	Hungarian Ambassador to Australia; 2015–2018	Succeeded by István Mikola
