= Attila Fülöp =

Hungarian politician (born 1978)

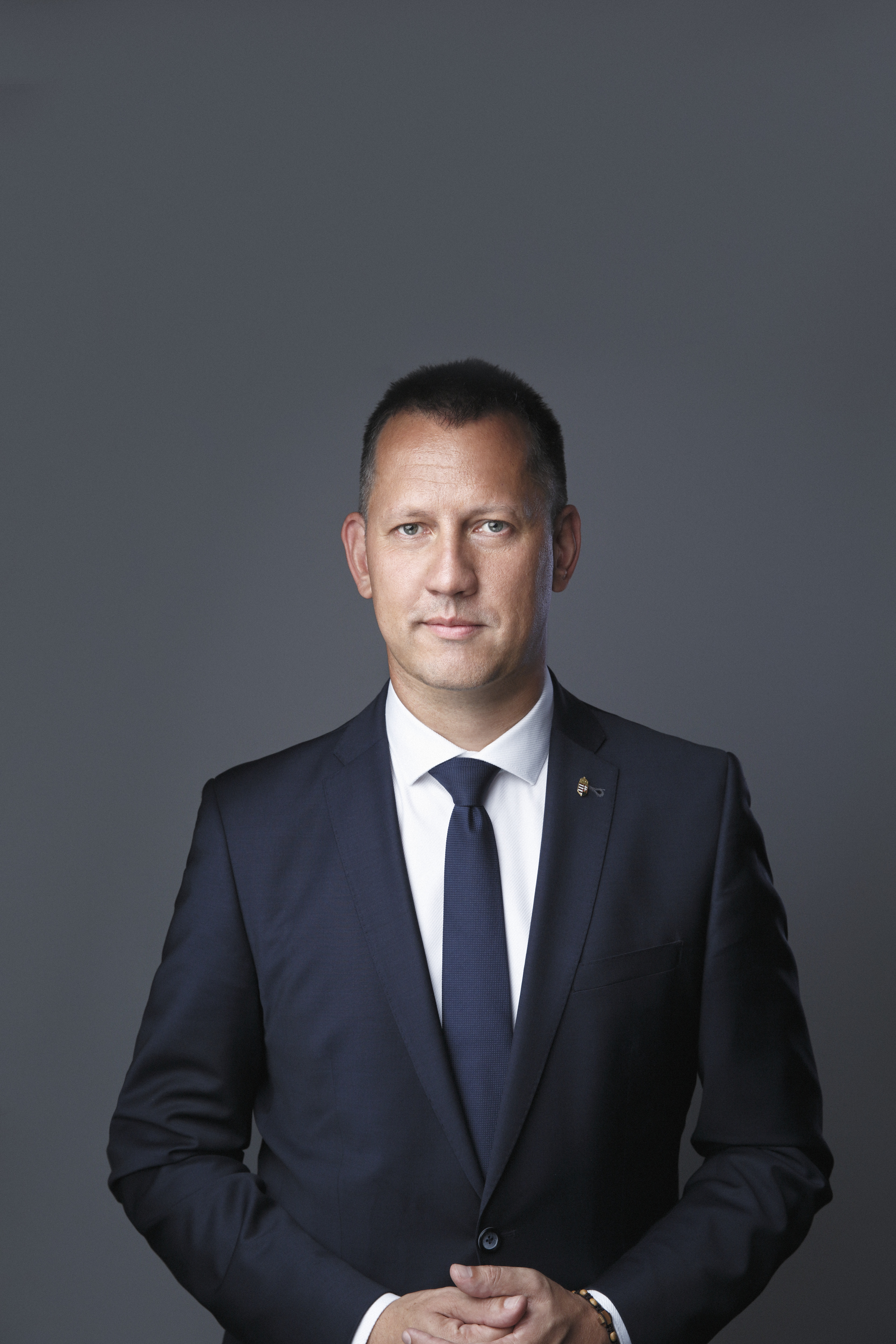
- Fülöp in 2025

Member of the National Assembly
- Incumbent
- Assumed office 17 March 2025
- Preceded by: Mihály Varga

Personal details
- Born: 20 September 1978 (age 47)
- Party: Fidesz

Attila Fülöp (born 20 September 1978) is a Hungarian politician serving as a member of the National Assembly since 2025. He has served as state secretary of the Ministry of Interior since 2022. From 2018 to 2022, he served as state secretary of the Ministry of Human Resources.
