= Pest County 2nd constituency =

- Constituency for the National Assembly
- Location of Pest county 02 within Pest county

- Location of Pest county within Hungary
- County: Pest
- Electorate: 82,977 (2026)
- Major settlements: Budaörs

Current constituency
- Created: 2024
- Party: Tisza Party
- Member: Gábor Pósfai
- Elected: 2026

The Pest County 2nd parliamentary constituency is one of the 106 constituencies into which the territory of Hungary is divided by Act LXXIX of 2024, and in which voters can elect one member of the National Assembly. The standard abbreviation of the constituency name is: Pest 02. OEVK. The seat is Budaörs.

== Area ==
The constituency includes the following settlements:

1. Biatorbágy
2. Budakeszi
3. Budaörs
4. Diósd
5. Nagykovácsi
6. Pusztazámor
7. Remeteszőlős
8. Sóskút
9. Törökbálint

== Members ==
Name	Party	Term	Comment
Csenger-Zalán Zsolt	Fidesz-KDNP	2014–2022	Results of the 2014 parliamentary election:
Csenger-Zalán Zsolt	Fidesz-KDNP	2014–2022	Results of the 2018 parliamentary election:
Tamás Menczer	Fidesz-KDNP	2022–2026	Results of the 2022 parliamentary election:
Gábor Pósfai	Tisza Party	2026 – present	Results of the 2026 parliamentary election: 62.82%

== Demographic profile ==
Historical population
Year	Pop.	±%
2011	109,368	—
2022	125,294	+14.6%

The population of the 2nd constituency of Pest County was 125,294 on 1 October 2022. The population of the constituency increased by 15,926 between the 2011 and 2022 censuses. Based on the age composition, the majority of the population in the constituency is middle-aged with 45,552 people, while the fewest are elderly with 22,591 people. 91.4% of the population of the constituency has internet access.

According to the highest level of completed education, those with a diploma are the most numerous, with 40,556 people, followed by those with a high school diploma, with 33,026 people.

According to economic activity, almost half of the population is employed, 63,341 people, the second most significant group is inactive earners, who are mainly pensioners with 22,193 people.

The most significant ethnic group in the constituency is Germans with 4,346 people and Gypsies with 541 people. The proportion of foreign citizens without Hungarian citizenship is 1.7%.

According to religious composition, the largest religion of the residents of the constituency is Roman Catholic (29,161 people), and there is also a significant community of Calvinists (9,480 people). The number of those not belonging to a religious community is also significant (14,276 people), the second largest group in the constituency after the Roman Catholic religion.
