= Dániel Z. Kárpát =

Hungarian journalist and politician (born 1979)

Dániel Zsiga-Kárpát (born 1 June 1979 in Budapest), Hungarian writer, politician, member of Hungarian National Assembly and vice-president of Jobbik.

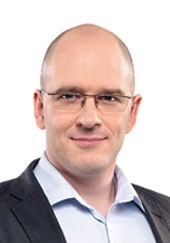
Writer, politician

== Early life ==
He published seven books in Hungarian.

== Political career ==
He wrote the environment programme of Jobbik. Since 2010 he is a member of Hungarian National Assembly. On 25 January 2020, he was elected for vice-president of Jobbik. In 2022 a video of him performing a Nazi salute was released.
