= László Kiss (politician) =

Hungarian politician (born 1979)

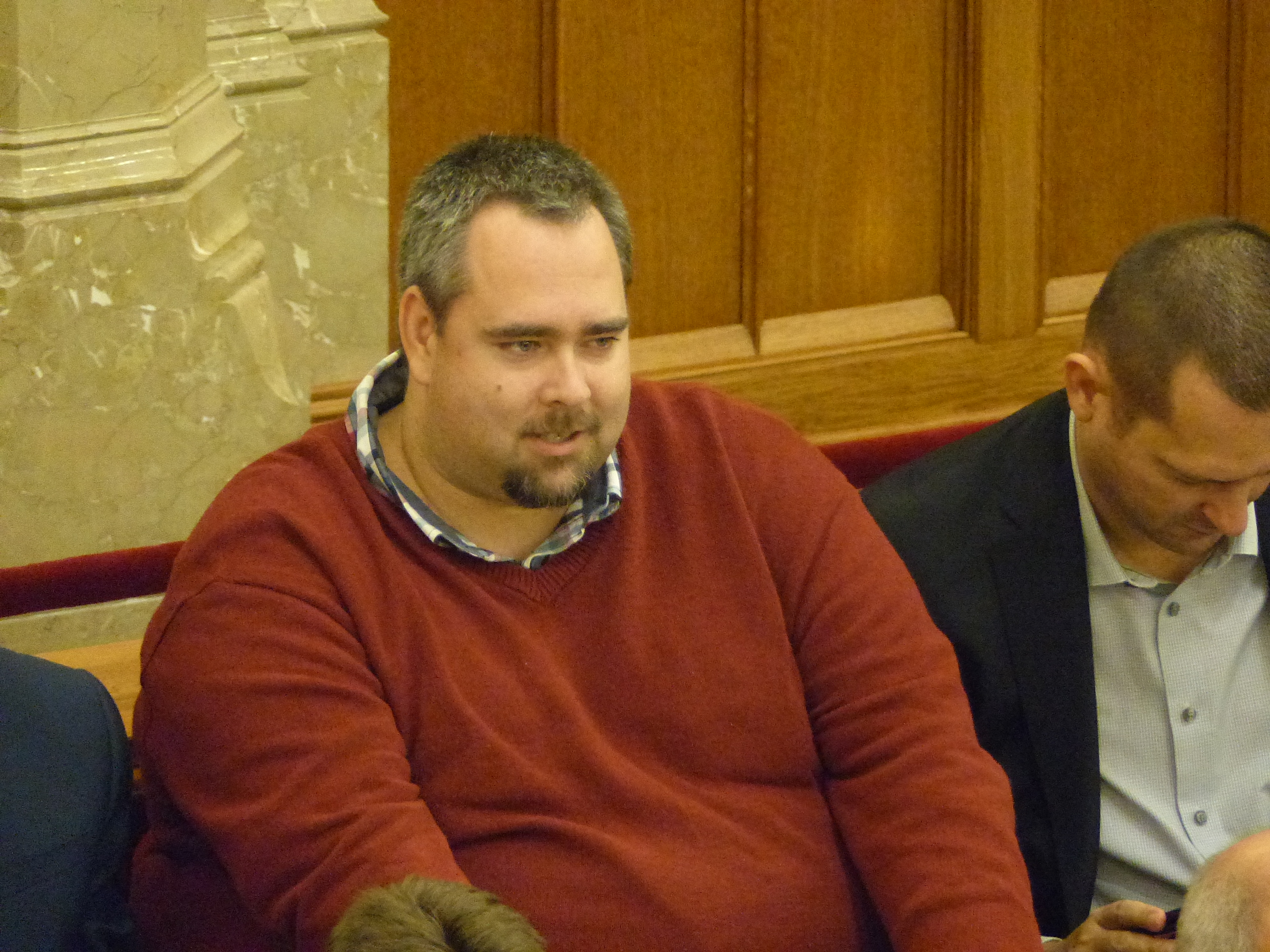
- Kiss in 2016

Mayor of Óbuda-Békásmegyer District III, Budapest
- Incumbent
- Assumed office 13 October 2019
- Preceded by: Balázs Bús

Member of the National Assembly
- In office 6 May 2014 – 7 May 2018

Personal details
- Born: 2 July 1979 (age 47) Kaposvár, Hungary
- Party: Independent (since 2026)
- Other political affiliations: MSZP (1996–2020); DK (2020–2026)
- Profession: Teacher, politician, jurist

László Kiss (born 2 July 1979) is a Hungarian politician who has been the mayor of Óbuda-Békásmegyer (3rd district of Budapest) since 2019. He was also a member of the National Assembly (MP) for the district (Budapest Constituency X) from 2014 to 2018.

== Studies and professional career ==
Kiss finished his secondary studies at the Pál Kinizsi Secondary School of Food Industry in 1997. He earned a degree of history teacher at the Faculty of Humanities of the Eötvös Loránd University (ELTE) in 2004. He obtained a degree in public education leadership from the Faculty of Economics and Social Sciences of the Budapest University of Technology and Economics (BME) in 2008. He obtained a law degree from the Faculty of Political Science and Law of the Károli Gáspár University of the Reformed Church in Hungary (KRE) in 2017, and is currently a student at the doctoral school there. His field of research is constitutional law and the enforcement of national rights.

He taught at the Zrínyi Miklós Secondary Grammar School from 2004 to 2006, then worked for the Ministry of Education between 2006 and 2010. He worked as a teacher at the József Eötvös Vocational High School in Gyál from 2010 to 2018.

== Political career ==
At the age of seventeen, Kiss joined the Hungarian Socialist Party (MSZP) in 1996. Since 2008, he is the executive vice-president of the party's local branch in Óbuda, he was a member of the party's presidium in Budapest between 2010 and 2018. He was elected chairman of the National Ethics and Coordination Committee of the Socialist Party in 2018. Kiss was a member of the municipal assembly of Óbuda-Békásmegyer from 2006 to 2014.

Kiss was elected a Member of Parliament for Óbuda-Békásmegyer in the 2014 parliamentary election, defeating incumbent MP Erzsébet Menczer, the candidate of Fidesz. In the National Assembly, Kiss was a member of the National Cohesion Committee from 2014 to 2018, the Enterprise Development Committee from 2014 to 2015 and the Legislative Committee from 2015 to 2016. He was one of the most active representatives of the National Assembly in the 2014–2018 parliamentary term, with more than 225 speeches and 579 motions. He was the first to propose tightening animal protection laws. He is primarily a supporter of several civil protection initiatives dealing with national policy, education policy and animal welfare. He did not run in the 2018 parliamentary election, where he supported the joint candidate of MSZP and PM Tímea Szabó.

Kiss was nominated the joint mayoral candidate of MSZP, PM, Democratic Coalition (DK), Momentum Movement and Politics Can Be Different (LMP) in Óbuda (3rd district of Budapest) for the 2019 local elections. He defeated the long-time mayor Balázs Bús (Fidesz), becoming the first left-wing mayor of Óbuda since the transition to democracy. He was also elected to the municipal assembly as an individual representative. Kiss switched from the Socialist Party to Democratic Coalition on 20 February 2020. Following the DK going extra-parliamentary after the 2026 Hungarian parliamentary election, Kiss announced that he had left the party.

Kiss was arrested on corruption charges in 2024 as part of a scandal involving public procurement kickbacks. Kiss has denied wrongdoing, claiming the arrest was a political campaign by Viktor Orbán with the intention of arresting popular left-wing mayors and damaging the credibility of Budapest mayor Gergely Karácsony.
