= Church of Our Lady of Sarlós =

Roman Catholic church in Budapest

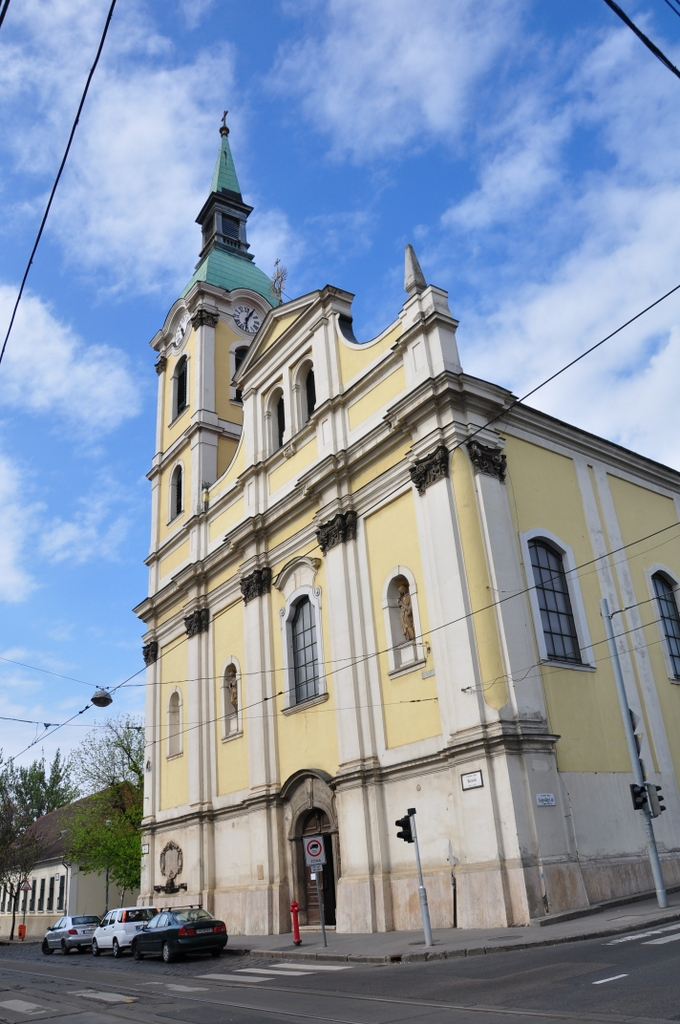

The Church of the Blessed Virgin Mary is a historic Roman Catholic church in Újlak, in the Budapest II district of Hungary.

== History ==
The church was erected between 1746 and 1766. It was designed Hungarian architects Kristóf Hamon and Máté Nöpauer.

The main altar inside the church was designed by Kristóf Hickisch and officially consecrated in 1799. The bell tower, which was originally erected in the center of the main façade, had to be demolished in 1765 due to a structural defect and replaced by a new tower on the south side of the building. The roof has been replaced twice due to weather damage, including a 1793 lightning strike and a rainstorm in 1875. Its present eclectic appearance was designed by Miklós Ybl in 1877.

The church was renovated from 1957 to 1960 and again in 1997. In the 20th century, classrooms were added on to the original 18th-century building.

== Building Description ==
Above the main entrance is the Latin inscription CREATORI 1705 CREATURA, referring to the year the parish was founded.

The interior contains a triple-vaulted nave and an organ gallery. The walls contain several curved alcoves, designed to give the impression of greater size and space.

The interior contains multiple murals, which were painted in the 1920s.

== Artwork ==
The main altar area has a painting of the Visitation of the Virgin Mary to Saint Elizabeth, which appears to be in the style of the painter Ferenc József Falconer; the church also contains sculptures completed the artist Frigyes Held in 1799.

The church contains a monstrance dating back to 1761, where it was used on the previous altar, while the pulpit dates back to 1747 or 1748, having been a gift from the Poor Clares. The interior of one of the arched alcoves contains an altar of Saint Anna, which was relocated there in 1779 from nearby Matthias Church. The church contains many other side altars donated by citizens and which feature the citizens' popular saints . Saint Sebastian is particularly represented; also present is a side altar to Saint Florian dating to 1778, a side altar of St. Anthony of Padua dating back to 1777 or 1778, and a side altar of the Virgin Mary dating back to 1760. Nearest to the main altar is a side altar of the Heart of Jesus dating back to 1902; this replaced a 1782 side altar of St. John of Nepomunk.

The interior also features a wooden Pietà which was carved 1818 work by artist Lőrinc Dunaiszky. It also contains a Rieger organ which as of 2022, is in a state of disrepair.
