= Zsolt Molnár =

Hungarian politician (born 1974)

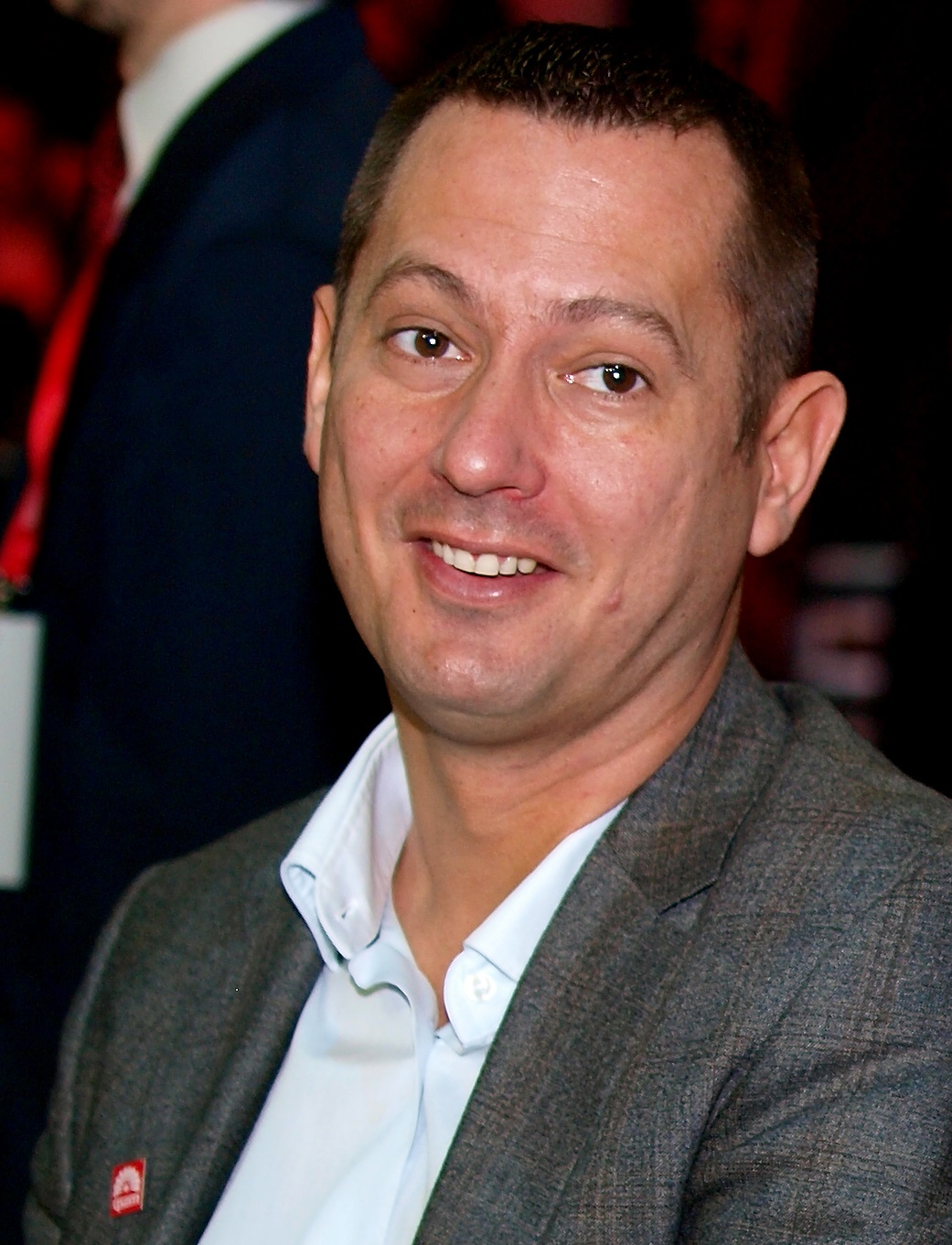

Member of the National Assembly
- Incumbent
- Assumed office 15 May 2006

Personal details
- Born: 4 October 1974 (age 52) Budapest, Hungary
- Party: MSZP
- Spouse: Eszter Gabriella Molnár
- Children: Leona Gabriella
- Profession: jurist, politician

Zsolt Molnár (born 4 October 1974) is a Hungarian politician who served as a member of the National Assembly from the Hungarian Socialist Party's Budapest Regional List from 2006 to 2014, and from his party's national list since 2014.

He completed his primary schooling studies at the Primary School of Ady Endre Street in 1989. He finished Szilágyi Erzsébet Secondary Grammar School in District I, Budapest. He graduated with "Summa cum laude" from the Faculty of Law of the Eötvös Loránd University.

Between 1998 and 2002 he worked as an assistant rapporteur for the 2nd-3rd district Prosecutor's Office in Budapest. After he took his bar examination in 2002. After that he managed his owner lawyer's office. His special fields are the company and economy law and resolution of the legal problems of owner-occupied blocks. From the autumn of 2002 he was a member of Local government of District II, Budapest. From 2003 he participated in the Infrastructural development and Housing subcommittee of the Economic Committee as preparatory rules connected with owner-occupied blocks.

He is a member of the Hungarian Socialist Party (MSZP) and the Youth Left-wing. Since 2004 he has been the president of the Ethics Committee of Budapest 2nd district branch of MSZP. In 2005 he was elected president of Budapest 2nd district Branch and a member of the National Board. Beside his political activity he committed himself to civil initiatives. He is the founder and legal representative "Our home is the 2nd district in Europe" Community Foundation and he is a member of the supervisory board of the foundation For the Future of Homeless People.

In the 2006 parliamentary election he obtained a mandate from Budapest Regional List. He was appointed a member of the Committee on National Security. He was the chairman of the committee from 2011 to 2018.

Molnár was arrested on 4 June 2026 and accused of taking bribes as part of the Óbuda scandal.
