= Erzsébet Menczer =

Hungarian journalist and politician

Member of the National Assembly
- In office 14 May 2010 – 5 May 2014

Personal details
- Born: 29 September 1961 (age 64) Budapest, Hungary
- Party: Fidesz
- Children: 2
- Profession: journalist, politician

Erzsébet Menczer (born 29 September 1961) is a Hungarian journalist and politician, member of the National Assembly (MP) for Óbuda-Békásmegyer (Budapest Constituency III) from 2010 to 2014. She was a member of the Committee on Cultural and Press Affairs since 14 May 2010. She became a member of the Defence and Internal Security Committee on 11 February 2013.

She was defeated by Socialist politician László Kiss in the 2014 parliamentary election. Before the election, it was revealed that Menczer's son and his fiancée were received municipal flats illegally by the local government in Békásmegyer. During the voting, Menczer also voted in favour of renting. Later in March 2014, the Democratic Coalition (DK) accused that one of their activists was physically assaulted by Menczer during a campaign event. Menczer denied and refused the charges. Menczer again ran as a candidate in Óbuda-Békásmegyer constituency, but was defeated by Dialogue for Hungary (PM) politician Tímea Szabó in the 2018 parliamentary election.

== Personal life ==
She is married and has two children.
