= Tamás Menczer =

Hungarian politician (born 1984)

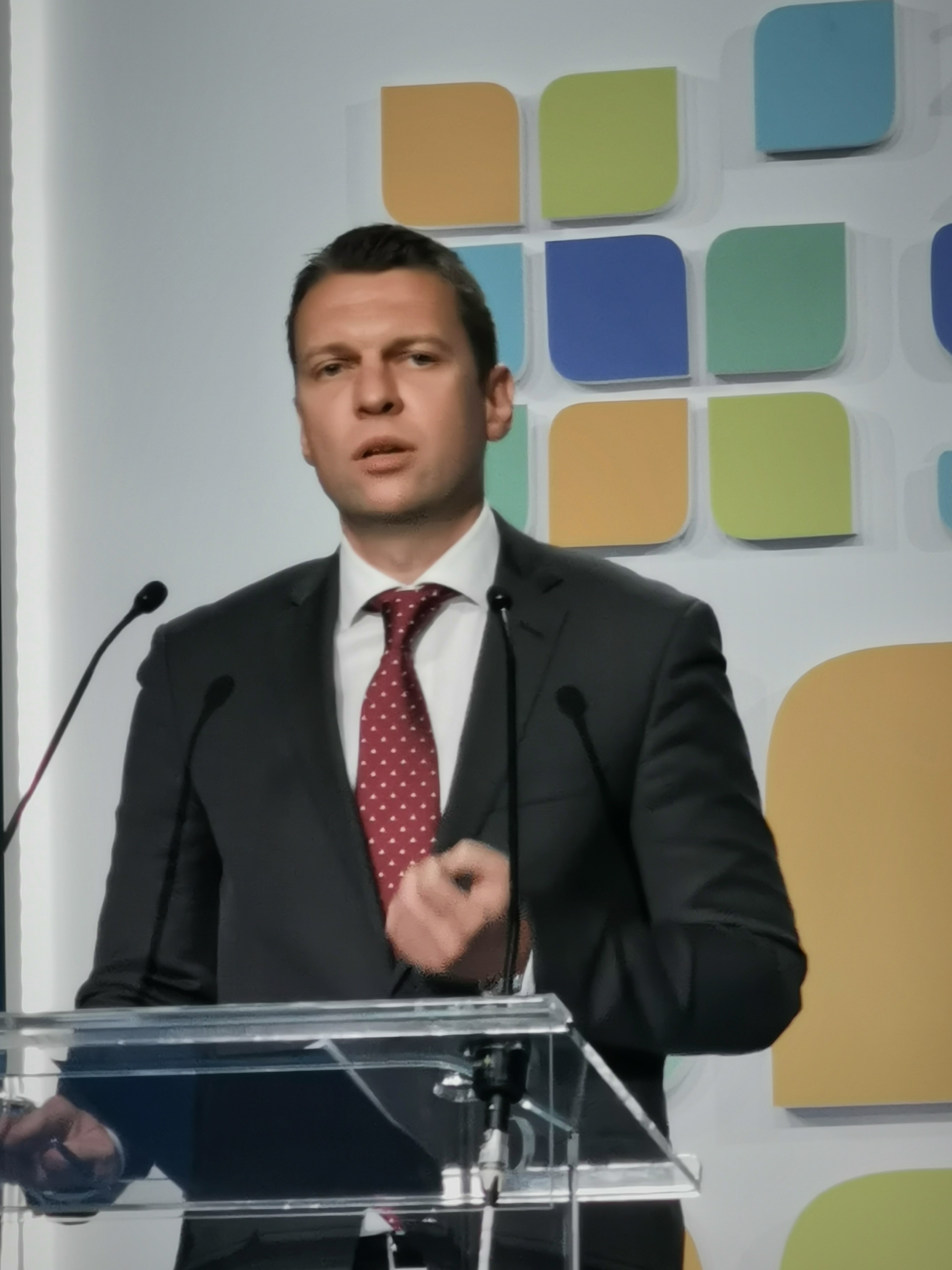
- Menczer in 2020

Member of the National Assembly
- In office 2 May 2022 – 8 May 2026
- Preceded by: Zsolt Csenger-Zalán
- Constituency: Pest County 2nd

Personal details
- Born: 19 March 1984 (age 42)
- Party: Fidesz (since 2020)

Tamás Menczer (born 19 March 1984) is a Hungarian politician serving as a member of the National Assembly from 2022 to 2026. He has served as communications director of Fidesz–KDNP since 2024. From 2018 to 2024, he served as state secretary of the Ministry of Foreign Affairs. After the 2026 Hungarian parliamentary election, where Fidesz–KDNP suffered a heavy defeat and fell from power, Menczer did not take up his mandate.
