= Óbuda-Békásmegyer =

3rd District of Budapest

3rd District of Budapest Budapest III. kerülete Óbuda-Békásmegyer
- District of Budapest
- District III
- Flag Coat of arms

- Location of District III in Budapest (shown in grey)
- Coordinates: 47.5674°N 19.0370°E
- Country: Hungary
- Region: Central Hungary
- City: Budapest
- Established: 17 November 1873
- Quarters: List: Aranyhegy-Ürömhegy-Péterhegy; Aquincum; Békásmegyer; Csillaghegy; Csúcshegy; Harsánylejtő; Hármashatár-hegy; Kaszásdűlő; Mocsárosdűlő; Óbuda; Óbuda hegyvidéke; Óbudai-sziget; Rómaifürdő; Solymárvölgy; Újlak

Government
  - Mayor: László Kiss (DK)

Area
  - Total: 39.7 km^{2} (15.3 sq mi)
  - Rank: 3rd

Population (2016)
  - Total: 130,415
  - Rank: 2nd
  - Density: 3,290/km^{2} (8,510/sq mi)
- Demonym: harmadik kerületi ("3rd districter")
- Time zone: UTC+1 (CET)
  - Summer (DST): UTC+2 (CEST)
- Postal code: 1031 ... 1039
- Website: obuda.hu

Óbuda-Békásmegyer is the 3rd district of Budapest, Hungary.

== Landmarks ==
- Aquincum, ruins of the Roman city
- Óbuda Jewish Cemetery
- Római Part (Roman Beach)

== History ==
The military camp, then city of Aquincum, located in part of what later became known as Óbuda, was built there by the Roman Empire. The settlement, which existed from the 1st to the 4th century, had a military and a separate civilian area. It had advanced infrastructure such as an aqueduct, a bath and two amphitheatres, one for the military and one for the civilians. Several villas belonged to the settlement, and the Roman governor had his palace on Hajógyári Island.

== Politics ==
The current mayor of III. District of Budapest is László Kiss (Independent).

The District Assembly, elected at the 2019 local government elections, is made up of 23 members (1 Mayor, 16 Individual constituencies MEPs and 6 Compensation List MEPs) divided into this political parties and alliances:

Party	Seats	Current District Assembly
Opposition coalition (Note: Coalition of Momentum–DK–MSZP–Dialogue–LMP.)	16	M
BB Óbudáért-Fidesz-KDNP	6	

=== List of mayors ===
Member	Party	Date
István Tarlós	SZDSZ	1990–2006
István Tarlós	Ind.	1990–2006
Balázs Bús	Fidesz	2006–2019
László Kiss	MSZP	2019–
László Kiss	DK	2019–

== Twin towns – sister cities ==
Óbuda-Békásmegyer is twinned with:

- Bemowo (Warsaw), Poland
- Billigheim, Germany
- Büyükçekmece, Turkey
- Miercurea Ciuc, Romania
- Landstraße, Austria
- Old Town (Košice), Slovakia
- Udine, Italy
- Sơn Tây, Hanoi, Vietnam
- Stirling, Scotland, United Kingdom
