= Name days in Hungary =

This is a calendar of name days in Hungary.

== January ==
1. Fruzsina
2. Ábel
3. Genovéva, Benjámin
4. Titusz, Leona
5. Simon
6. Boldizsár
7. Attila, Ramóna
8. Gyöngyvér
9. Marcell
10. Melánia
11. Ágota
12. Ernő
13. Veronika
14. Bódog
15. Lóránt, Loránd
16. Gusztáv
17. Antal, Antónia
18. Piroska
19. Sára, Márió
20. Fábián, Sebestyén
21. Ágnes
22. Vince, Artúr
23. Zelma, Rajmund
24. Timót
25. Pál (or Paul)
26. Vanda, Paula
27. Angelika
28. Károly, Karola
29. Adél
30. Martina, Gerda
31. Marcella

== February ==
1. Ignác
2. Karolina, Aida, Mária
3. Balázs
4. Ráhel, Csenge
5. Ágota, Ingrid
6. Dorottya, Dóra, Dorka
7. Tódor, Rómeó
8. Aranka
9. Abigél, Alex
10. Elvira
11. Bertold, Marietta
12. Lídia, Lívia
13. Ella, Linda
14. Bálint, Valentin
15. Kolos, Georgina
16. Julianna, Lilla
17. Donát
18. Bernadett
19. Zsuzsanna
20. Aladár, Álmos
21. Eleonóra
22. Gerzson
23. Alfréd
24. Mátyás
25. Géza
26. Edina
27. Ákos, Bátor
28. Elemér

== March ==
1. Albin
2. Lujza
3. Kornélia
4. Kázmér
5. Adorján, Adrián
6. Leonóra, Inez
7. Tamás
8. Zoltán
9. Franciska, Fanni
10. Ildikó
11. Szilárd
12. Gergely, Athan
13. Krisztián, Ajtony
14. Matild
15. Kristóf
16. Henrietta
17. Gertrúd, Patrik
18. Sándor, Ede
19. József, Bánk
20. Klaudia
21. Benedek
22. Beáta, Izolda, Lea
23. Emőke
24. Gábor, Karina
25. Irén, Írisz
26. Emánuel
27. Hajnalka
28. Gedeon, Johanna
29. Auguszta
30. Zalán
31. Árpád

== April ==
1. Hugó
2. Áron
3. Buda, Richárd
4. Izidor
5. Vince
6. Vilmos, Bíborka
7. Herman
8. Dénes
9. Erhard
10. Zsolt
11. Leó, Szaniszló
12. Gyula
13. Ida
14. Tibor
15. Anasztázia, Tas
16. Csongor
17. Rudolf
18. Andrea, Ilona
19. Emma
20. Tivadar
21. Konrád
22. Csilla, Noémi
23. Béla
24. György
25. Márk
26. Ervin
27. Zita, Mariann
28. Valéria
29. Péter
30. Katalin, Kitti

== May ==
1. Fülöp, Maja, Jakab
2. Zsigmond, Idir
3. Tímea, Irma
4. Mónika, Flórián
5. Györgyi
6. Ivett, Frida
7. Gizella
8. Mihály
9. Gergely
10. Ármin, Pálma, Ajna
11. Ferenc
12. Pongrác
13. Szervác, Imola
14. Bonifác
15. Zsófia, Szonja
16. Mózes, Botond
17. Paszkál
18. Erik, Alexandra
19. Ivó, Milán
20. Bernát, Felícia
21. Konstantin
22. Júlia, Rita
23. Dezső
24. Eszter, Eliza
25. Orbán
26. Fülöp, Evelin
27. Hella
28. Emil, Csanád
29. Magdolna
30. Janka, Zsanett
31. Angéla, Petronella

== June ==
1. Tünde
2. Kármen, Anita
3. Klotild, Cecília
4. Bulcsú, Jason
5. Frézia, Zenke, Fatime, Fatima, Bonifác
6. Norbert, Cintia
7. Róbert
8. Medárd
9. Félix
10. Margit, Gréta
11. Barnabás
12. Villő
13. Antal, Anett
14. Vazul
15. Jolán, Vid, Ariana
16. Jusztin
17. Laura, Alida
18. Arnold, Levente
19. Gyárfás
20. Rafael
21. Alajos, Leila
22. Paulina
23. Zoltán
24. Iván
25. Vilmos
26. János, Pál
27. László
28. Levente, Irén
29. Péter, Pál
30. Pál

== July ==
1. Tihamér, Annamária, Amika
2. Ottó
3. Kornél, Soma
4. Ulrik
5. Emese, Sarolta
6. Csaba
7. Apollónia
8. Ellák
9. Lukrécia
10. Amália
11. Nóra, Lili
12. Izabella, Dalma
13. Jenő,
14. Örs, Stella
15. Henrik, Roland, Örkény
16. Valter
17. Endre, Elek, Dzsesszika
18. Frigyes
19. Emília
20. Illés
21. Dániel, Daniella
22. Magdolna
23. Lenke, Brigitta
24. Kinga, Kincső
25. Kristóf, Jakab
26. Anna, Anikó
27. Olga, Liliána
28. Szabolcs
29. Márta, Flóra
30. Judit, Xénia
31. Oszkár

== August ==
1. Boglárka
2. Lehel
3. Hermina
4. Domonkos, Dominika
5. Krisztina
6. Berta, Bettina
7. Ibolya
8. László
9. Emőd
10. Lőrinc, Zavën
11. Zsuzsanna, Tiborc
12. Klára
13. Ipoly
14. Marcell
15. Mária
16. Ábrahám
17. Jácint
18. Ilona
19. Huba
20. István
21. Sámuel, Hajna
22. Menyhért, Mirjam
23. Bence
24. Bertalan
25. Lajos, Patrícia
26. Izsó
27. Gáspár
28. Ágoston
29. Beatrix, Erna
30. Rózsa
31. Bella, Erika

== September ==
1. Egyed, Egon
2. Rebeka, Dorina
3. Hilda
4. Rozália
5. Viktor, Lőrinc
6. Zakariás
7. Regina
8. Mária, Adrienn
9. Ádám
10. Nikolett, Hunor
11. Teodóra
12. Mária
13. Kornél
14. Szeréna, Roxána
15. Enikő, Melitta
16. Edit, Hans
17. Zsófia
18. Diána
19. Vilhelmina
20. Friderika
21. Máté, Mirella
22. Móric
23. Tekla, Líviusz
24. Gellért, Mercédesz
25. Eufrozina, Kende
26. Jusztina
27. Adalbert
28. Vencel
29. Mihály, Miguel
30. Jeromos

== October ==
1. Malvin
2. Petra
3. Helga
4. Ferenc
5. Aurél
6. Brúnó, Renáta
7. Amália
8. Koppány
9. Dénes
10. Gedeon
11. Brigitta
12. Miksa
13. Kálmán, Ede
14. Helén
15. Teréz
16. Gál
17. Hedvig
18. Lukács
19. Nándor
20. Vendel
21. Orsolya
22. Előd
23. Gyöngyi
24. Salamon
25. Blanka, Bianka, Mór
26. Dömötör
27. Szabina
28. Simon, Szimonetta
29. Nárcisz
30. Alfonz
31. Farkas

== November ==
1. Marianna
2. Achilles
3. Győző
4. Károly
5. Imre
6. Lénárd Nuno
7. Rezső
8. Zsombor
9. Tivadar Nátán
10. Réka
11. Márton
12. Jónás, Renátó
13. Szilvia
14. Aliz
15. Albert, Lipót
16. Ödön
17. Hortenzia, Gergő
18. Jenő
19. Erzsébet
20. Jolán
21. Olivér
22. Cecília
23. Kelemen, Klementina
24. Emma
25. Katalin
26. Virág
27. Virgil
28. Stefánia
29. Taksony
30. András, Andor

== December ==
1. Elza
2. Melinda, Vivien
3. Ferenc, Elias
4. Borbála, Barbara
5. Vilma
6. Miklós
7. Ambrus
8. Mária
9. NatáliaDelila
10. Judit
11. Árpád, Árpádina
12. Gabriella
13. Luca, Otília
14. Szilárda
15. Valér
16. Etelka, Aletta
17. Lázár, Olimpia
18. Auguszta
19. Viola
20. Teofil
21. Tamás
22. Zénó
23. Viktória
24. Ádám, Éva, Nikolasz
25. Eugénia
26. István
27. János
28. Kamilla
29. Tamás, Tamara
30. Dávid
31. Szilveszter
