= Hungarian name =

Hungarian names include surnames and given names. Some people have more than one given name, but only one is normally used. In the Hungarian language, whether written or spoken, names are invariably given in the "Eastern name order", with the family name followed by the given name (in foreign-language texts in languages that use Western name order, names are often given with the family name last). Hungarian is one of the few national languages in Europe to use the Eastern name order, like Chinese, Japanese, Korean, Vietnamese, Khmer, Telugu, and some Basque nationalists.

== Orthography ==
Although Hungarian orthography is now simpler than it was in the 18th and the 19th centuries, many Hungarians still use the old spelling for their names. For example, the letter c is often written as cz. Letters such as q, w, x and y are usually seen only in foreign words but may also be seen in older spellings of names, especially in noble family names that originated in the Middle Ages.

Family names that refer to a place of origin and end with the suffix -i have two possible endings: they can be written with the -i suffix, which is used in every other context, or with a -y suffix, both of which mean "from" or "of" a place and are pronounced the same way. A family originating from Szeged and named after that fact thus may spell its surname "Szegedi" or "Szegedy", both of which mean "from Szeged" or "of Szeged". The -y ending is popularly but falsely believed to indicate noble origin. However, it is true is that -y is an older spelling, and older records were more likely to record people of higher rank and wealth.

== Hungarian surnames ==
Hungarian normally puts family names, except for foreign names, first in Hungarian speech and text. Some Hungarian surnames relate to professions like Szabó (tailor), Kovács (smith), Halász (fisher). Other surnames refer to ethnic origin. For example, common Hungarian surnames include Németh (German), Horváth (Croat), Tóth (Slavonian Croat, Slovak and Slovenian ), Lengyel (Polish), Oláh (Romanian) and Rác/Rácz/Rátz (outdated term for Serb).

During the 19th and the early 20th centuries, people in the Kingdom of Hungary who were of non-Hungarian ethnicity, with Jewish, German or Slovak ancestry, were encouraged to adopt Hungarian surnames. Some people with German names translated them directly into Hungarian. Some of them just magyarized their original German surnames into Hungarian forms. However, many Hungarians of German descent retained their original surnames like Horn, Deutsch, Staller, Keller, Rockenbauer, Hoffmann, etc.

A few given names are also used as family names, similarly to naming conventions in some other languages like German. Examples of this are Károly or László, which can be both used as given or family names.

The top three most frequent surnames in Hungary are Nagy, Kovács, and Tóth.

== Hungarian given names ==
The origin of Hungarian names is closely related to the religious and dynastic history of the country. Many saints' names and royal names have Hungarian equivalents.

=== Female names ===
- Anna after Saint Anne
- Boglárka: after the buttercup flower
- Csilla: derived from the word csillag, or "star"
- Enikő: coined by poet Mihály Vörösmarty in the 19th century and is derived from Enéh ("doe")
- Erzsébet: popular after the princess Saint Elizabeth of Hungary
- Eszter: after the Biblical character Esther
- Éva after biblical Eve
- Ildikó: of Germanic origin; compare to Hilda
- Ilona after Saint Helen
- Katalin: after Saint Catherine of Alexandria, whose cult gained great importance in the 15th century.
- Magdolna after biblical Mary Magdalene
- Margit: after Saint Margaret of Hungary.
- Mária: after the Virgin Mary
- Márta: mentioned in The Bible
- Melinda: popularized by playwright József Katona, who used the name in his 1815 historical tragedy, Bánk bán
- Orsolya: Hungarian form of the Latin name Ursula ("little bear")
- Piroska: of pagan origin, popular after Saint Piroska (renamed Irene), the daughter of King Ladislaus I of Hungary
- Ráhel: after the Biblical character Rachel
- Réka: after the name of Attila the Hun's wife
- Tünde: coined by poet Mihály Vörösmarty in the 19th century in his work Csongor és Tünde, derived from the word tündér ("fairy")
- Zsófia: Hungarian form of the Greek Sophia
- Zsuzsanna: Hungarian form of the Greek Susanna

=== Male names ===
- Ádám: after biblical Adam
- András: a name that became popular after King Andrew I of Hungary and was given to three monarchs and to several princes.
- Antal: after Saint Anthony of Padua.
- Attila: after Attila, King of the Huns, from whom the Hungarian monarchs considered themselves direct descendants, which made this name become part of popular culture.
- Béla: a name of pagan origin that was given to four medieval Kings of Hungary and is still commonly used.
- Csaba: after one of the sons of Attila, the King of the Huns.
- Géza: a name of pagan origin that was given to two medieval Kings of Hungary and to many princes and is still popular.
- György: after King (and Saint) Stephen I of Hungary honoured Saint Martin of Tours but also Saint George, who has been since Hungary's early times one of its most important holy characters.
- Ferenc: after Francis II Rákóczi Prince of Transylvania, Ruling Prince of Hungary in war time.
- István: after the first King of Hungary, Saint Stephen I of Hungary
- Imre: after King Stephen's son, Saint Emeric of Hungary.
- János: after John the Baptist.
- Jenő: after Prince Eugene of Savoy, rescuer of Hungary and national hero.
- József: after Saint Joseph.
- Károly: after the king of French origin Charles I of Hungary.
- Lajos: after the King of French origin Louis I of Hungary.
- László: a name that was popularised by Saint Ladislaus I of Hungary.
- Lőrinc: after Saint Lawrence of Rome.
- Márk: after the evangelist Saint Mark.
- Márton: after Saint Martin of Tours, who was born in the Early Middle Ages in the territory of modern-day Hungary, before it existed as a country.
- Mátyás: after a Christian saint, whose name became even more popular after the reign of the King Matthias Corvinus of Hungary (1458–1490).
- Mihály after Michael Archangel.
- Péter: after Peter the Apostle.
- Sándor: after Alexander the Great, whose history was translated in medieval Hungary and made extremely popular during the 14th century.
- Tamás: After the biblical figure Saint Thomas.
- Vilmos Hungarian form of Wilhelm.
- Zoltán: a popular name of pagan origin that was very common in modern times after Zoltán of Hungary, a tribal chief in the early 10th century.
- Zsigmond: After King Sigismund of Hungary (1368–1437), a member of the House of Luxembourg, who was Holy Roman Emperor in his twilight years.

== Second given names and religious names ==
While it is increasingly frequent that Hungarians are given a second given name, they tend to choose one that they prefer to use.

When baptised, a child may get an additional name (baptismal name), especially if there is no saint who bears its name, and so they take a name associated with a patron saint. At confirmation, children receive another given name, but it is not used. Both baptismal and confirmation names have religious significance only and are not on any official records.

== Married names ==
There is a wide range of selection of a married name. Until about the 18th century noblewomen kept their names at marriage and their children received their father's name; it became compulsory only under the reign of Joseph II. When Hungary was under Habsburg rule and became influenced by Western European traditions, women became known by their husbands' names. So for example Szendrey Júlia, marrying Petőfi Sándor, became Petőfi Sándorné (the -né suffix approximately means "wife of", and this is the Hungarian equivalent of "Mrs." as in "Mrs. John Smith"). This was both the law and the tradition until the 1950s. During the Communist rule of Hungary, great emphasis was put upon the equality of women and men, and from that time, women could either choose to keep their maiden name or take that of their husband. Most women did the latter except for artists.

Now, the alternatives for a woman when she marries are as shown below (using the examples of Szendrey Júlia and Petőfi Sándor – Júlia and Sándor are their given names):

- Júlia can keep her maiden name, as Szendrey Júlia (now very popular, especially among more-educated women).
- Júlia gives up her name, adds the suffix -né to her husband's full name, and will be called Petőfi Sándorné.
- Júlia adds the suffix -né to her husband's family name, adds her full name and will be called Petőfiné Szendrey Júlia.
- Júlia adds the suffix -né to her husband's full name, adds her full name and will be called Petőfi Sándorné Szendrey Júlia (less popular these days, because it is long to write).
- Júlia takes her husband's family name, keeps her given name "Júlia" and will be called Petőfi Júlia.

The applicable law, which used to give substantially different sets of options to women and men, was declared sexist and unconstitutional. The ensuing amendment, in force since 2004, also lists options for men. Thus:

- Sándor can keep his birth name, as Petőfi Sándor (the most common choice).
- Sándor takes his wife's family name, keeps his given name "Sándor" and will be called Szendrey Sándor (often considered when the wife's family name sounds remarkably better than the husband's one).
- A further new option is hyphenation. In our example, the family name Petőfi-Szendrey or Szendrey-Petőfi will be introduced for one or both parties. A sole party not assuming the hyphenated form keeps his or her original family name.

Note that using opposing hyphenations (i.e. Szendrey-Petőfi Sándor and Petőfi-Szendrey Júlia) and exchanging names (i.e. Petőfi Sándor and Szendrey Júlia become Szendrey Sándor and Petőfi Júlia) are not allowed. Also, one can have a maximum of two last names. If one or both partners-to-be come to the marriage with more than one surname, they will have to agree which ones to keep.

Both the bride and groom have to declare at the wedding which name they will use, and they have to declare which family name their children will get (which can be changed until the birth of the first child). Children can get either parent's surname, if it is on the marriage certificate, but all children must have the same surname. Since 2004 they can also get a hyphenated name, but only if both parents kept their birth names at least as one part of their new name. Children usually get their father's surname, but hyphenated names are becoming more common.

Couples of the same sex are not allowed to marry in Hungary, so they cannot legally use each other's names unless they change their names through a deed of change of name.

=== Women's names in everyday life ===
When a woman takes her husband's name in the traditional way, as in Petőfi Sándorné, her female first name no longer forms part of her official name, yet this is the name she will be called by even after her wedding, in all but the most formal contexts. Thus, Hungarian radio speakers and others often resort to a compromise like Kovács Jánosné, Juli néni (Mrs. János Kovács, aunt Juli) to indicate how the woman should be called by others. (Néni and bácsi, "aunt" and "uncle", are traditional polite forms to address older people, and, for children, to address all adults; it does not indicate a family relationship.)

Some women who officially bear the -né form will nevertheless introduce themselves with their husband's family name and their own first name (in our example, Kovács Júlia or Kovácsné Júlia, rather than Kovács Jánosné), to avoid confusion about how to address them.

If the woman takes her husband's full name, the couple can easily be referred to in writing as Petőfi Sándor és neje (Sándor Petőfi and wife), equivalent to the English form "Mr. and Mrs. John Smith". This can be seen on older tombstones in Hungarian cemeteries.

== Hungarian law on names ==
By law, children born as Hungarian citizens may bear no more than two surnames (most people have only one; those who have two may hyphenate them). They can also have only one or two given names (religious names not included since they are not official: see above). Given names may be chosen by the parents from an official list of several thousand names (technically, one list for each gender). If the intended name is not on the list, the parents need to apply for approval. Applications are considered by the Research Institute for Linguistics of the Hungarian Academy of Sciences following a set of principles. Thus, names are approved if they are not derogatory or overly diminutive, can be written and pronounced easily, can be recognised as either male or female etc. Approved names expand the official list, the newest edition of which is regularly published. Many recent additions are foreign names, but they must be spelled following Hungarian phonetics: Jennifer becomes Dzsenifer or Joe becomes Dzsó.

Those who belong to an officially recognized minority in Hungary may also choose names from their own culture, and a register of given names maintained by the respective minority governance must be observed.

If one or both parents of a child to be named are foreign citizens, the given name(s) may be chosen in accordance with the respective foreign law.

== Treatment of Hungarian names in English and other languages ==
Outside Hungary, Hungarian names are usually rendered by the Western convention of other European languages. In English language academic publishing, archiving and cataloguing, different manuals of style treat Hungarian names in different ways. The Chicago Manual of Style 16th Edition (2010) reverses the Hungarian order to put the given name first but allows all of the diacritics in the name:

8.13 Hungarian names. In Hungarian practice the family name precedes the given name — for example, Molnár Ferenc, Kodály Zoltán. In English contexts, however, such names are usually inverted — Ferenc Molnár, Zoltán Kodály [...]

When indexing names, Hungarian names are re-inverted so that the surname comes first in English indexes, as for English names.

== Hungarian treatment of foreign names ==
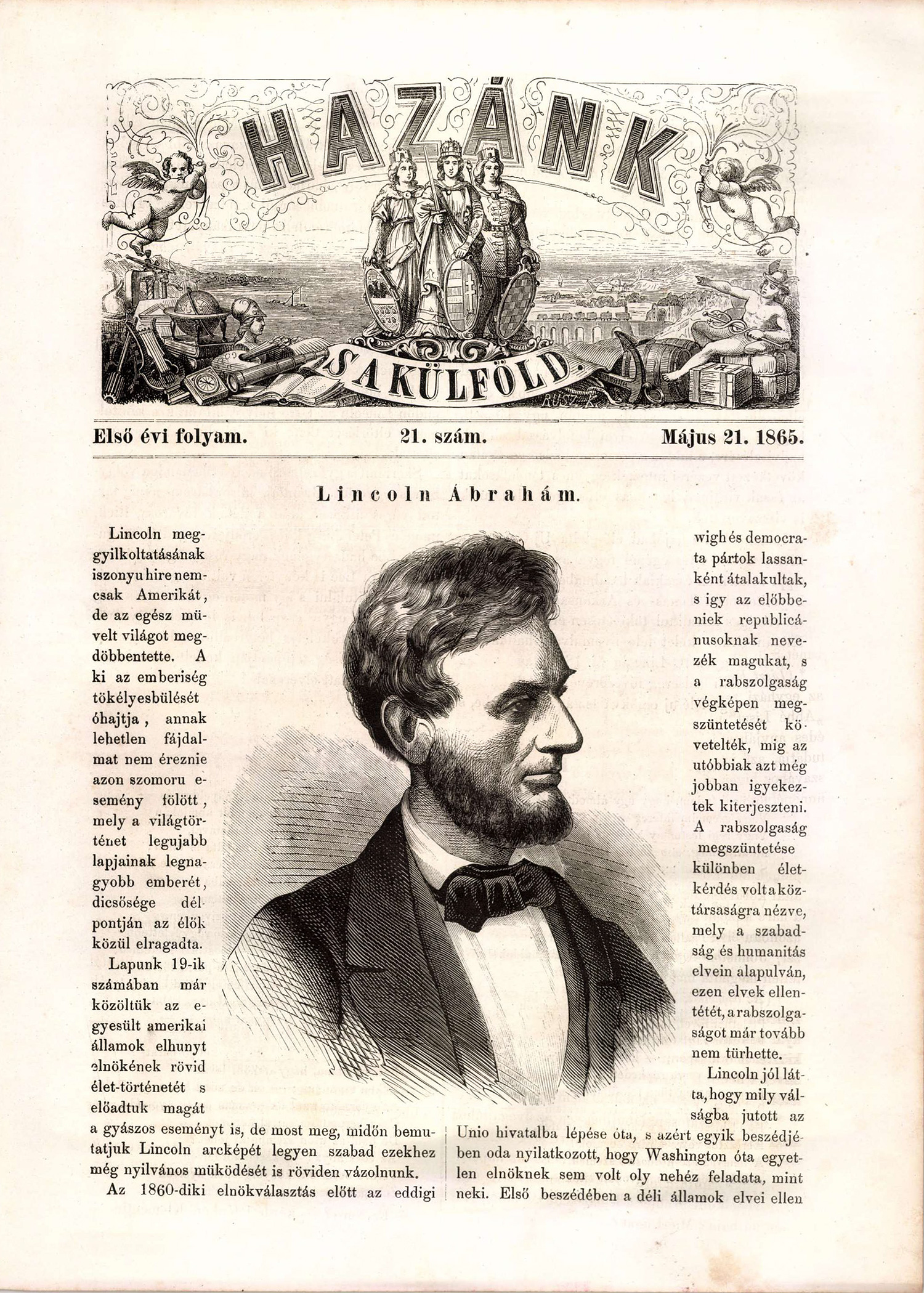
Page from Hazánk s a Külföld rendering Abraham Lincoln's name as "Lincoln Ábrahám", showcasing the Hungarianization of foreign names that was common up until the 20th century.

This way of writing names is not used for people who are neither Hungarian nor from another country that uses the Eastern name order. For example, Tony Blair will stay as "Tony Blair" in Hungarian texts. However, names of leaders of countries are translated only in the case of monarchs and members of their families, such as Elizabeth II becomes "II. Erzsébet", and Pope Benedict XVI becomes "XVI. Benedek pápa". Additionally, before the 20th century, foreign names were often translated, especially names of historical importance. For example, "Verne Gyula" for Jules Verne, and "Kálvin János" for John Calvin.

Names from languages not using Latin script (Arabic, Chinese, Japanese, Korean, Cyrillic, Greek, etc.) are transcribed according to Hungarian pronunciation rather than according to official romanization systems or conventional English spellings. For example:

Common spelling in English	Original name	Original romanization	Spelling in Hungarian
Sanae Takaichi	高市早苗 (Japanese)	Takaichi Sanae (Hepburn)	Takaicsi Szanae
Xi Jinping	习近平 (Chinese)	Xí Jìnpíng (Pinyin)	Hszi Csin-ping
Lee Jae Myung	이재명 (Korean)	I Jaemyeong (RR)	I Dzsemjong

== See also ==
- Most common Hungarian surnames
