= Dénes Lukács =

Dénes Lukács may refer to:

- Dénes Lukács (colonel) (1816–1868), Hungarian artillery commander in 1848 Revolution
- Dénes Lukács (psychologist) (living), Hungarian psychologist
- Dénes Lukács (tennis) (born 1987), Hungarian Davis Cup team player
