= Gige =

Gige Gigovec (in Croatian)
- Village
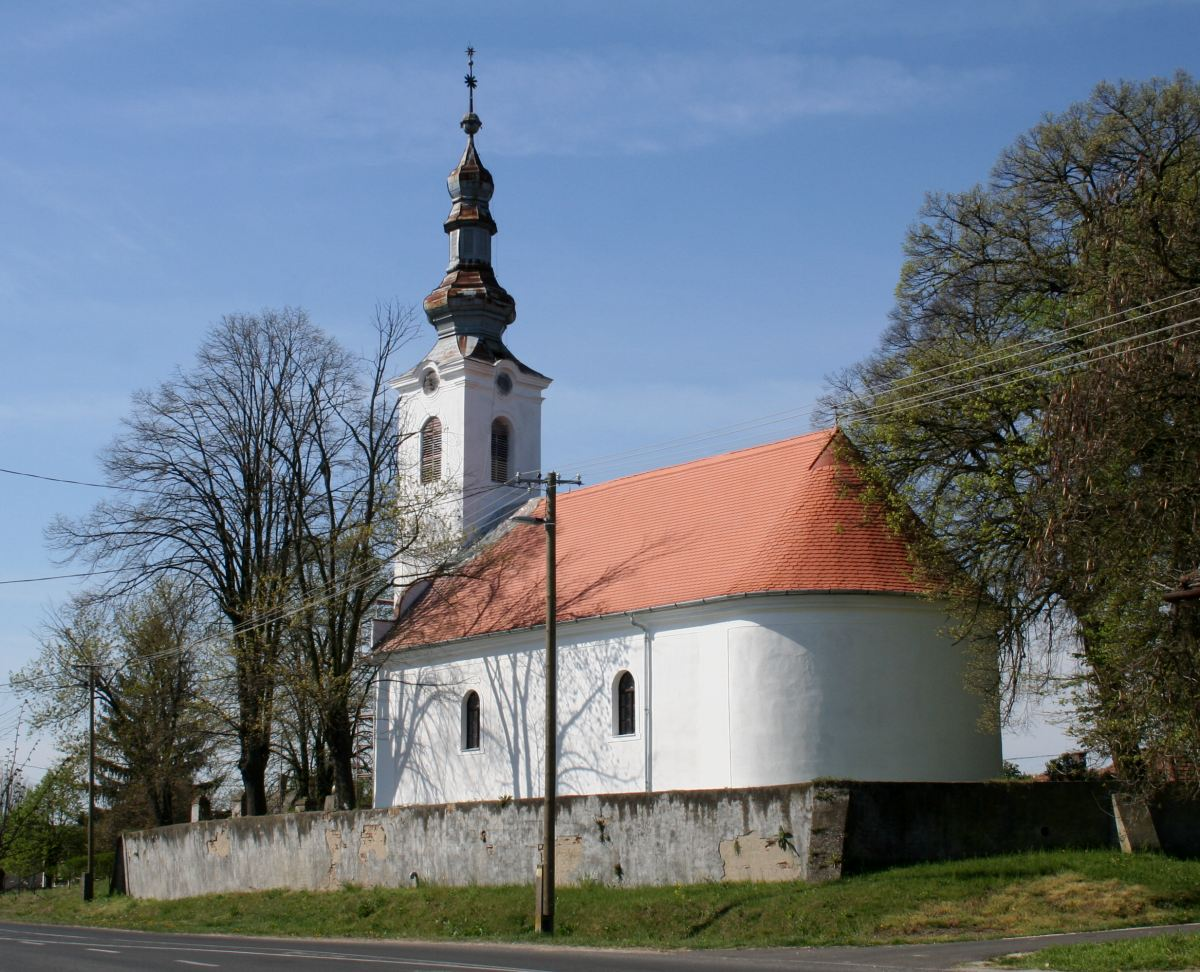
- Reformed Church of Gige

- Coat of arms

- Location of Somogy county in Hungary

- Location of Gige
- Coordinates: 46.30223°N 17.61172°E
- Country: Hungary
- Region: Southern Transdanubia
- County: Somogy
- District: Kaposvár
- RC Diocese: Kaposvár

Area
  - Total: 13.19 km^{2} (5.09 sq mi)

Population (2017)
  - Total: 374
  - Density: 28.4/km^{2} (73.4/sq mi)
- Demonym: gigei
- Time zone: UTC+1 (CET)
  - Summer (DST): UTC+2 (CEST)
- Postal code: 7527
- Area code: (+36) 82
- NUTS 3 code: HU232
- MP: László Szászfalvi (KDNP)
- Website: Gige Online

Gige (Croatian: Gigovec) is a village in Somogy County, Hungary.

== Etymology ==
The older name of the village was Gége (Hungarian: larynx). But according to the scientific explanation its first owner was called Gége. That could be a shorter form of Gergely or a nickname referring to his larynx.

== History ==
According to László Szita the settlement was completely Hungarian in the 18th century.
