= Mihály =

- Gender: masculine
- Language: Hungarian
- Name day: September 29

Other gender
- Feminine: Mihaéla

Origin
- Language: Hebrew
- Meaning: Who is like God?

Other names
- Nicknames: Misi, Miska
- Cognate: Michael
- Anglicisation: Michael

Mihály (Hungarian pronunciation: [ˈmihaːj]) is a Hungarian masculine given name and a surname. It is a cognate of the English Michael. Notable people with thename include:

== Given name ==
- Mihály András (1917–1993), Hungarian cellist, composer, and academic teacher
- Mihály Apafi (1632–1690), Hungarian Prince of Transylvania
- Mihály Babák (born 1947), Hungarian politician and member of the Hungarian National Assembly
- Mihály Babits (1883–1941), Hungarian poet, writer and translator
- Mihály Bakos (ca. 1742–1803), Hungarian-Slovene Lutheran priest, author, and educator
- Mihály Balázs (born 1948), Hungarian historian and professor of religious history
- Mihály Balla (born 1965) Hungarian politician and member of the Hungarian National Assembly
- Mihály Barla (ca 1778–1824), Slovene evangelic pastor, writer and poet
- Mihály Bertalanits (1788–1853), Slovene cantor, teacher, and poet in Hungary
- Mihály Bíró (1914–1970), Hungarian football forward
- Mihály Bozsi (1911–1984), Hungarian water polo player and Olympic medalist
- Mihály Csáky (ca. 1492–1572), Hungarian noble in the Principality of Transylvania and Chancellor of Transylvania
- Count Mihály Cseszneky de Milvány et Csesznek (15??–???), Hungarian nobleman and border castle hero in the 16th century
- Mihály Csikszentmihalyi (1934–2021), Hungarian psychology professor and educator
- Mihály Csokonai Vitéz (1773–1805), Hungarian poet
- Mihály Dávid (1886–1944), Hungarian track and field and Olympic medalist
- Mihály Deák-Bárdos (born 1975), Hungarian amateur Greco-Roman wrestler and Olympic competitor
- Mihály Dömötör (1875–1962), Hungarian politician
- Mihály Dresch (born 1955), Hungarian saxophone player
- Mihály Eisemann (1898–1966), Hungarian composer
- Mihály Erdélyi (1895–1979), Hungarian composer
- Mihály Farkas (1904–1965), Hungarian communist politician
- Mihály Fazekas (1766–1828), Hungarian writer and poet
- Mihály Fekete (1884–1960), Hungarian actor, screenwriter and film director
- Mihály Flaskay (born 1982), Hungarian breaststroke swimmer
- Mihály Fülöp (1936–2006), Hungarian fencer and Olympic medalist
- Mihály Gáber (ca. 1753–1815), Slovene Roman Catholic priest and writer
- Mihály Hesz (born 1943), Hungarian sprint canoer and Olympic medalist
- Mihály Horváth (1809–1878), Hungarian Roman Catholic bishop, historian, and politician
- Mihály von Ibrányi (1895—1962), Hungarian officer during World War II
- Mihály Iglói (1908–1998), Hungarian track and field athlete, Olympic medalist and distance running coach
- Mihály Imreffy(ca. 1460–1536), Hungarian soldier and noble
- Mihály Iváncsik (born 1959), Hungarian handball player and Olympic competitor
- Mihály Ivanicsics (1893–1968), Hungarian football player and referee
- Mihály Lajos Jeney (1723/1724–1797), Hungarian military officer and mapmaker
- Mihály Károlyi (1875–1955), Hungarian noble, politician, former Prime Minister and President
- Mihály Káthay (ca. 1565–1607), Hungarian soldier and noble, Chancellor of Transylvania
- Mihály Kincses (born 1918), Hungarian professional football player
- Mihály Kolossa (1846–1906), Slovene ploughman and writer in Hungary
- Mihály Korhut (born 1988), Hungarian football player
- Mihály Korom (1927–1993), Hungarian politician and jurist
- Mihály Kovács, (1818–1892), Hungarian painter
- Mihály Kovács (handballer) (born 1957), Hungarian handball player and Olympic competitor
- Mihály Kozma (born 1949), Hungarian football midfielder and Olympic medalist
- Mihály Kupa (born 1941), Hungarian politician
- Mihály Lantos (1928–1989), Hungarian football player and manager and Olympic medalist
- Mihály Lenhossék (1863–1937), Hungarian anatomist and histologist
- Mihály Lombard de Szentábrahám (1683–1758), Hungarian Unitarian bishop
- Mihály Lukács (1954–2012), Hungarian Romani politician, founding member of the Lungo Drom party
- Mihály Makkai (born 1939), Hungarian-born Canadian mathematician
- Mihály Mayer (1933–2000), Hungarian water polo player and Olympic medalist
- Mihály Mérey (ca. 1500–1572), Hungarian jurist and noble, Palatinal Governor in the Kingdom of Hungary
- Mihály Mikes (????–1662), Hungarian noble, Chancellor of Transylvania
- Mihály Mikes (????–1721), Hungarian landowner, aristocrat and politician
- Mihály Mosonyi (1815–1870), Hungarian composer
- Mihály Munkácsy (1844–1900), Hungarian painter
- Mihály Nagy (born 1937) Hungarian high school teacher, research teacher, university doctor, mineralogist, and meteorite researcher
- Mihály Nagymarosi (1919–2002), Hungarian football player
- Mihály Pataki (1893–1977), Hungarian football player and Olympic competitor
- Mihály Pollack (1773–1855), Hungarian architect
- Mihály Rácz Rajna (born 1934), Hungarian stage actor
- Mihály Sáfrán (born 1985), Hungarian sprint canoer and Olympic competitor
- Mihály Salbeck (1709–1758), Hungarian Roman Catholic priest, philosopher and educator
- Mihály Sasvári (born 1932), Hungarian sprint canoer
- Mihály Simai (born 1930), Hungarian economist
- Mihály Süvöltős (born 1949), Hungarian handball player and Olympic competitor
- Mihály Székely (1901–1963), Hungarian operatic bass singer
- Mihály Szemes (1920–1977), Hungarian film director
- Mihály Szeróvay (born 1982), Hungarian football player
- Mihály Szilágyi (ca. 1400–1460), Hungarian general and Regent of Hungary
- Mihály Táncsics (1799–1884), Hungarian writer, teacher, journalist and politician
- Mihály Tompa (1819–1868), Hungarian poet
- Mihály Tóth (1926–1990), Hungarian football player
- Mihály Tóth (born 1974), Hungarian football player
- Mihály Vajda (born 1935), Hungarian philosopher and intellectual
- Mihály Varga (born 1965), Hungarian politician
- Mihály Vasas (born 1933), Hungarian football player and coach
- Mihály Viczay (1757–1831), Hungarian numismatist, amateur archaeologist and collector
- Mihály Víg (born 1957), Hungarian composer, poet, songwriter, guitarist and singer
- Mihály Vörösmarty (1800–1855), Hungarian poet and dramatist
- Mihály Zichy (1827–1906), Hungarian painter and graphic artist

== Surname ==
- Dénes Mihály (1894–1953), Hungarian inventor, engineer
- István Mihály (1892–1945), Hungarian screenwriter
