= Jeno =

Jeno may refer to:

== People ==
- Jenő, a Hungarian given name
- Jeno Liu (born 1982), Chinese singer, DJ, producer and actress
- Jekob Jeno (born 2000), New Caledonian footballer
- Jeno (singer), (born Lee Je-no in 2000), South Korean singer and member of the boyband NCT Dream
- Jenorris Jeno James (born 1977), American former National Football League player
- Luigino Jeno Paulucci (1918–2011), American businessman and entrepreneur

== Other uses ==
- Jenő (village), a village in Fejér county, Hungary
- Jeno's, Paulucci's brand of pizza products, now sold under the Totino's line by General Mills
- Jeno's Pizza (Colombia), a restaurant chain

== See also ==
- Jegindø Danish island, locally pronounced 'Jenø'
