= Tivadar =

Tivadar may refer to:

- Tivadar, Szabolcs-Szatmár-Bereg County, a village in northeastern Hungary
- Tivadar (given name), Hungarian masculine given name
