= Schildkraut =

Schildkraut is a German surname. Notable people with the surname include:

- Dave Schildkraut (1925–1998), American jazz alto saxophonist
- Fruzsina Schildkraut (born 1998), Hungarian footballer
- Joseph Schildkraut (1896–1964), Austrian/American actor
- Rudolph Schildkraut (1862–1930), Austrian/American actor
