= Dorka (disambiguation) =

Dorka is a village in Russia.

Dorka may also refer to:

- Dorka Gryllus (born 1972), Hungarian actress
- Gertrud Dorka (1893–1976), German archaeologist, prehistorian and museum director
