= Dénes =

Dénes is a Hungarian male given name, the equivalent of Denis in English and can sometimes stand for or replace the feminine version of Den(n)is, namely Denise. As with many given names, it also transitioned into a surname in the Middle Ages. Notable people with the name include:

- Dénes Andrássy (1835–1913), Hungarian nobleman
- Dénes Berinkey (1871–1944), a Hungarian prime minister
- Dénes Birkás (1907–1996 ), Hungarian field hockey player 1936 Olympics
- Dénes Dibusz (b. 1990), Hungarian football player
- Dénes Farkas (1884–1973), Hungarian nobleman landowner, politician, member of the Hungarian Parliament
- Dénes Gábor (1900–1979), Hungarian-British Nobel Prize laureate physicist and engineer
- Dénes Gulyás (b. 1954), Hungarian tenor
- Dénes Györgyi (1886–1961), Hungarian architect
- Dénes Kemény (b. 1954), Hungarian water polo player
- Dénes Kőnig (1884–1944), Jewish Hungarian mathematician
- Dénes Lukács (colonel) (1816–1868), Hungarian artillery commander in 1848 Revolution
- Dénes Mihály (1894–1953), Hungarian inventor
- Dénes Pataky (1916–1986), Hungarian figure skater
- Dénes Pázmándy (1781–1854), Hungarian landowner and politician
- Dénes Rósa (b. 1977), Hungarian footballer
- Dénes Szakály (b. 1988), Hungarian football player
