= Frigyes =

Frigyes is a Hungarian masculine given name, originating in the 19th century as a Magyarized version of "Friedrich"; it can also be a surname. Notable people with the name include:

== Given name ==
- Frigyes Antal, Hungarian art historian
- Frigyes Bán, Hungarian screenwriter and film director
- Frigyes Barna (1896–1958), Hungarian ice hockey player
- Frigyes Feszl, Hungarian architect
- Frigyes Ákos Hazslinszky, Hungarian mycologist and botanist
- Frigyes Hefty, Austro-Hungarian flying ace
- Frigyes Hegedűs (1920–2008), Hungarian pentathlete
- Frigyes Helmeczi (1913–1984), Hungarian ice hockey player
- Frigyes Hidas, Hungarian composer
- Frigyes Hollósi (actor), Hungarian actor
- Frigyes Hollósi (sportsman) (1906–1979), Hungarian swimmer and rower
- Frigyes Karinthy, Hungarian author
- Frigyes Károlyházy, Hungarian theoretical physicist
- Frigyes Korányi (physician), Hungarian physician
- Frigyes Korányi (politician), Hungarian politician
- Frigyes Kubinyi (1909–1948), Hungarian boxer
- Frigyes Mezei (1887–1938), Hungarian athlete
- Frigyes Nagy, Hungarian engineer and former politician
- Frigyes Pabsz (1914–1945), Hungarian rower
- Frigyes Puja, Hungarian politician
- Frigyes Riedl, Hungarian writer
- Frigyes Riesz (1880–1956), Hungarian mathematician
- Frigyes Schulek, Hungarian architect
- Frigyes Szapáry, Austro-Hungarian diplomat
- Frigyes Turán (born 1974), Hungarian rally driver

== Surname ==
- Dezső Frigyes, Hungarian boxer
