= Ede =

Ede may refer to:

== Places ==
- Ede, Netherlands
- Ede, Osun, Nigeria

== People ==
- Rade or Êđê people of Vietnam

=== Given name ===
- Ede Dunai (born 1949), Hungarian footballer
- Ede Kallós (1866–1950), Hungarian sculptor
- Ede Komáromi (1928–2006), Hungarian basketball player
- Ede Király (1926–2009), Hungarian figure skater
- Ede Magyar (1877–1912), Hungarian architect
- Ede Poldini (1869–1957), Hungarian composer
- Ede Reményi (1828–1898), Hungarian violinist
- Ede Szigligeti (1814–1878), Hungarian dramatist
- Ede Telcs (1872–1948), Hungarian sculptor
- Ede Teller (1908–2003), Hungarian-American physicist
- Ede Tomori (1920–1997), Hungarian photographer
- Ede Vadászi (1923–1995), Hungarian basketball player
- Ede Višinka (born 1972), Serbian footballer

=== Surname ===
- Amatoritsero Ede (born 1963), Nigerian-Canadian poet
- Basil Ede (1931–2016), English wildlife artist
- Charles Ede (1921–2002), British publisher, founder of the Folio Society
- Charles Montague Ede (1865–1925), Hong Kong Businessman
- Dennis Ede (1931–2021), British Anglican priest
- Chinedu Ede (born 1987), German footballer of Nigerian descent
- George Ede (1834–1870), English cricketer
- George Ede (biathlete) (1940–2012), Canadian biathlete
- Graeme Ede (born 1960), New Zealand sport shooter
- James Ede (born 1984), English cricketer
- James Chuter Ede (1882–1965), British educationist and Labour politician, Home Secretary (1945–51)
- Jan Willem van Ede (born 1963), Dutch football goalkeeper
- Jim Ede (1895–1990), a British art collector and patron
- Piers Moore Ede (born 1975), British writer

== Languages ==
- Ede language, spoken in Benin and Togo
- Rade language, also known as Êđê, spoken in Vietnam

== Other uses ==
- Eating Disorder Examination Interview
- Ede the God, a character in the science fiction trilogy A Requiem for Homo Sapiens
- Europe–Democracy–Esperanto, a European electoral list
- EDE (Greece) or Workers Internationalist Union, a defunct political party
- Equinox Desktop Environment (EDE)
