= Fruzsina =

Female given name

- Gender: Female
- Name day: 1 January

Origin
- Origin: from Greek Euphrosyne (Εὐφροσύνη), one of the three Graces or Χάριτες (Charites) in Greek mythology
- Meaning: Mirth, merriment
- Region of origin: Hungary

Other names
- Related names: Eufrozina

Fruzsina is a Hungarian female given name, often a diminutive of Eufrozina, the Hungarian form of Euphrosyne.

Individuals bearing the name Fruzsina include:

- Fruzsina Brávik (born 1986), Hungarian water polo player
- Fruzsina Dávid-Azari (born 1989), Hungarian handballer
- Fruzsina Grek (born 2009), Hungarian rhythmic gymnast
- Fruzsina Medgyesi (born 1999), Hungarian figure skater
- Fruzsina Palkó (born 1992), Hungarian handballer
- Fruzsina Schildkraut (born 1998), Hungarian footballer
- Fruzsina Takács (born 1992), Hungarian handballer
