= Kelemen =

Kelemen may refer to:

== People ==
=== Surname ===
- Attila Kelemen (1948–2022), ethnic Hungarian politician in Romania and Member of the European Parliament
- Barnabás Kelemen (born 1978), Hungarian violinist
- Dávid Kelemen (born 1992), Hungarian football player
- Endre Kelemen (born 1947), retired Hungarian high jumper
- Éva Kelemen (born 1987), Hungarian handballer
- Fred Kelemen (born 1964), film director and cinematographer
- Hunor Kelemen (born 1967), Romanian politician and Hungarian language writer
- Katalin Kelemen, the first female rabbi in Hungary, where she was born
- Marián Kelemen (born 1979), Slovak football goalkeeper, currently playing for Slask Wroclaw
- Milko Kelemen (1924–2018), Croatian composer
- Miloš Kelemen (born 1999), Slovak ice hockey player
- Zoltán Kelemen (baritone) (1926–1979), Hungarian bass-baritone
- Zoltán Kelemen (figure skater) (born 1986), Romanian national champion
- R. Daniel Kelemen, professor of political science and law at Rutgers University

=== Given name ===
- Kelemen Mikes (1690–1761), Transylvanian-born Hungarian political figure and essayist

== Places ==
- Kelemen, Croatia, village in Croatia
- Kelemen-havasok or Călimani Mountains, the largest volcanic complex of the Carpathian Mountains in Transylvania, Romania
- Kelemen-patak or Călimănel River, tributary of the Mureş River in Transylvania, Romania

== See also ==
- Clemens (disambiguation)
- Keleman
- Klemen
- Klemens (given name)
- Kliment (disambiguation)
- Klimt
