= Tamás =

Tamás (Hungarian pronunciation: [ˈtɒmaːʃ]) is a Hungarian masculine given name. It is a Hungarian equivalent of the name Thomas, and sometimes also occurs as a surname. Notable people with the name include:

== Given name ==
- Tamás Adamik (born 1937), Hungarian linguist and professor
- Tamás Bognár (born 1978), Hungarian footballer
- Tamás Darnyi (born 1967), Hungarian Olympic champion swimmer
- Tamás Gábor (1932–2007), Hungarian Olympic champion épée fencer
- Tamás Györök (born 1979), Hungarian footballer
- Tamás Horváth, multiple people
- Tamás Kiss, multiple people
- Tamás Koltai, multiple people
- Tamás Mendelényi (1936–1999), Hungarian fencer
- Tamás Nagy, multiple people
- Tamás Németh (born 1981), Hungarian footballer
- Tamás Petres (born 1968), Hungarian footballer
- Tamás Somorjai (born 1980), Hungarian footballer
- Tamás Sulyok (born 1956), Hungarian politician and former president
- Tamás Varga, multiple people
- Tamás Vásáry (1933–2026), Hungarian concert pianist and conductor
- Tamás Wichmann (1948–2020), Hungarian canoer

== Surname ==
- Gáspár Miklós Tamás (1948–2023), Hungarian philosopher, critic, and politician
- Rebecca Tamás (born 1988), British poet, writer, critic, and editor, daughter of Gáspár Miklós Tamás
