= Gergely =

- Gender: masculine
- Language: Hungarian
- Name day: March 12, May 9

Origin
- Language: Greek
- Meaning: watchful, alert

Other names
- Variant forms: Gergő, Gerő
- Nicknames: Gergő, Geri
- Cognate: Gregorius
- Anglicisation: Gregory

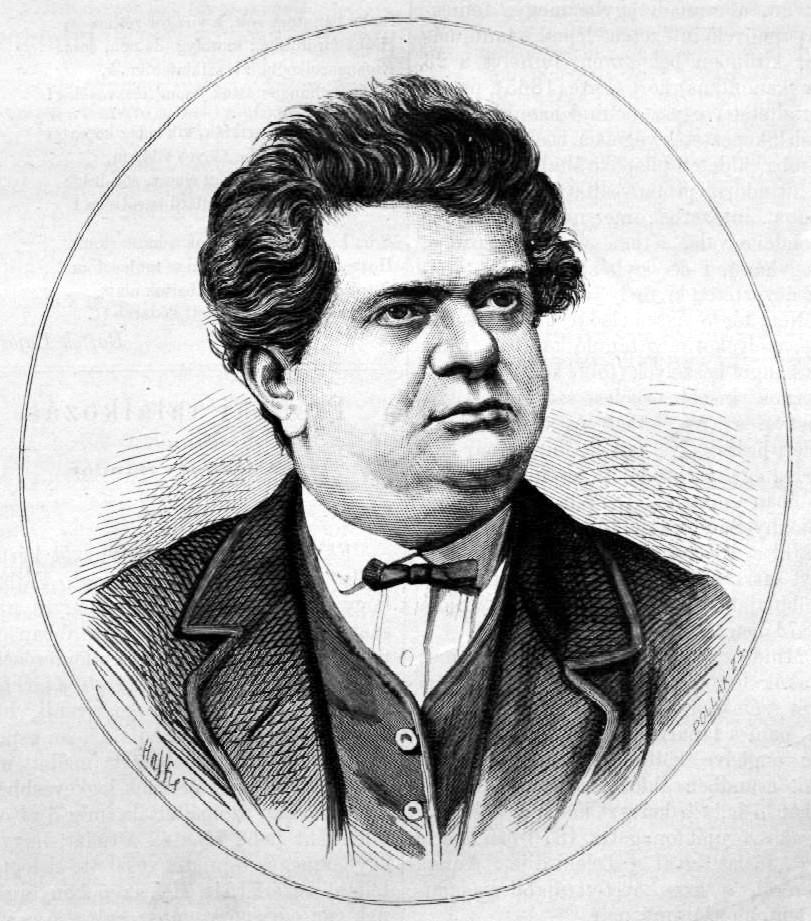

Gergely (pronounced [gɛrˈgɛj]) is a Hungarian given name and surname meaning Gregory (given name) and Gregory (surname), it may refer to:

- Gábor Gergely (born 1953), male former table tennis player from Hungary
- Gergely András Molnár (1897–2006), at age 108, the last Hungarian World War I veteran
- Gergely Balázs (born 1982), Hungarian football (forward) player
- Gergely Balogh (born 2001), Hungarian canoeist
- Gergely Berzeviczy (1763–1822), important political economist in the Kingdom of Hungary
- Gergely Bogányi (born 1974), pianist and winner of the Kossuth Prize
- Gergely Bornemissza (1526–1555), Hungarian soldier and national hero
- Gergely Boros, Hungarian sprint canoeist who has competed since the late 2000s
- Gergely Csiky (1842–1891), Hungarian dramatist
- Gergely Délczeg (born 1987), Hungarian professional footballer
- Gergely Fűzfa (born 1988), Hungarian football player
- Gergely Gyertyános, Hungarian sprint canoeist who has competed since the mid-2000s
- Gergely Harsányi (born 1981), Hungarian handballer
- Gergely Horváth (born 1975), retired male javelin thrower from Hungary
- Gergely Karácsony (born 1975), Hungarian political scientist, politician
- Gergely Kiss (born 1977), Hungarian water polo player
- Gergely Kocsárdi (born 1975), Hungarian football player
- Gergely Kulcsár (1934–2020), Hungarian athlete, who competed in the javelin throw
- Gergely Luthár (1841–1925), Slovene landowner, notar and writer in Hungary
- Gergely Palágyi (born 1979), Hungarian hurdler who specializes in the 110 metres hurdles
- Gergely Pongrátz (1932–2005), famous veteran of the Hungarian Revolution of 1956
- Gergely Rudolf (born 1985), Hungarian football player
- Gergely Rusvay (born 1978), Hungarian football player
- Gergely Sárközy, Hungarian musician who plays guitar, lute, lute-harpsichord, viola bastarda, and organ
- Gergely Salim, Hungarian-Danish taekwondo practitioner
- István Gergely (born 1976), Hungarian water polo player
- Marc Gergely, Democratic Party member of the Pennsylvania House of Representatives
- Matthew Gergely (1979/1980–2025), Democratic Party member of the Pennsylvania House of Representatives
- Peter Gergely (born 1964), former football player from Slovakia
- Tibor Gergely (1900–1978), artist best known for his work in several popular children's books
- Vasile Gergely (born 1941), Romanian former football player
