= Fülöp =

Fülöp is Hungarian for Philip.

It may also refer to:

== People ==
- Fülöp (surname), a Hungarian surname

== Places ==
- Fülöp, Hungary, a village in Hajdú-Bihar county
