= Tihamér =

- Gender: Male
- Language: Hungarian
- Name day: 1 July

Origin
- Region of origin: Hungary

Tihamér is a masculine given name, the Hungarian form of the Slavic Tihomir. Notable people with the given name include:

- Tihamér Margitay (1859–1922), Hungarian painter
- Tihamér Lukács (born 1980), Hungarian footballer
- Tihamér Fabinyi (1890–1953), Hungarian politician
