= Judit =

Judit is a feminine given name of Hungarian and Catalan origin related to Judith. Notable people with the name include:

- Judit Bar-Ilan (1958–2019), Israeli computer scientist
- Judit Benavente (born 1989), Spanish model, public figure and influencer
- Judit Elek (1937–2025), Hungarian film director and screenwriter
- Judit Földing-Nagy (born 1965), Hungarian runner who specializes in the marathon
- Judit Gófitz (1701–1723), Hungarian conjoined twins
- Judit Kovács (born 1969), Hungarian retired high jumper
- Judit Lannert (born 1962), Hungarian politician
- Judit Mascó (born 1969), Catalan model, television host and writer
- Judit Polgár (born 1976), Hungarian chess Grandmaster
- Judit Sándor, Hungarian lawyer, bioethicist and author
- Judit Temes (born 1930), Hungarian swimmer and Olympic champion
- Judit Varga (athlete) (born 1976), Hungarian middle-distance runner
- Judit Varga (composer) (born 1979), Hungarian composer
