= Judit Sándor =

Hungarian lawyer and bioethicist

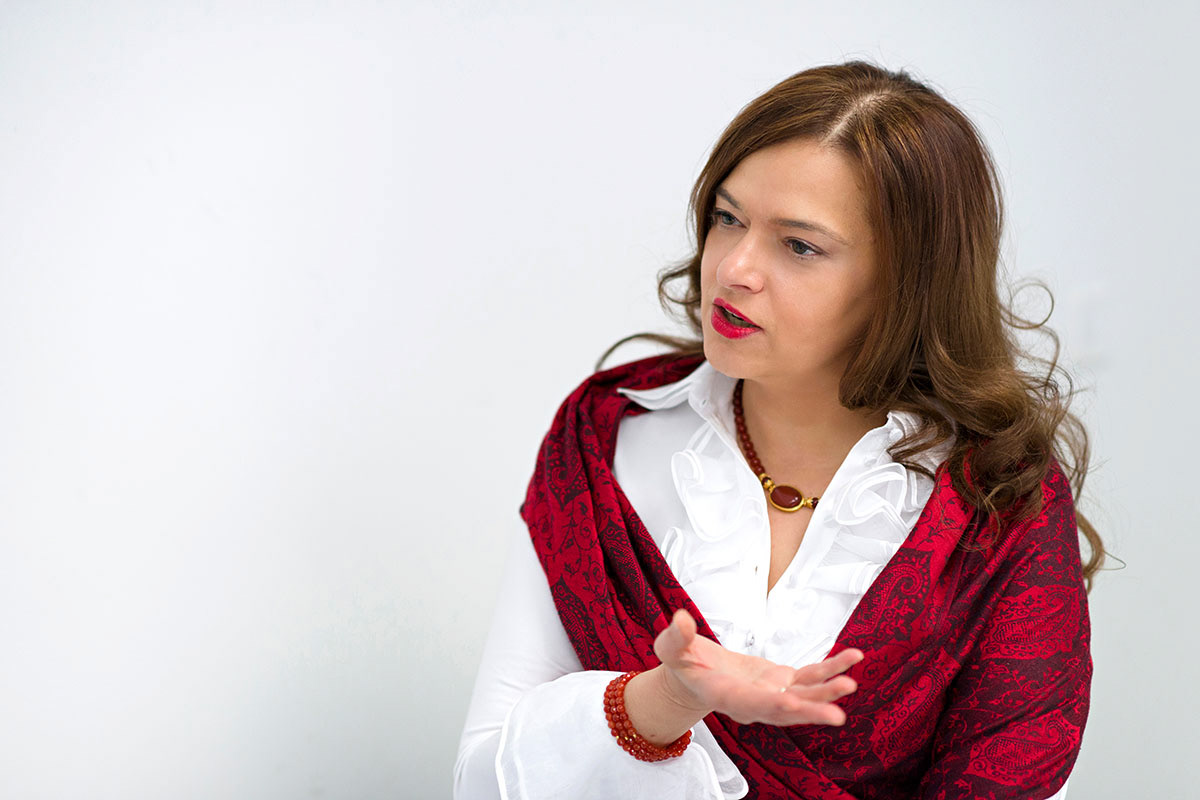
- Judit Sándor at the Central European University

Judit Sándor is a Hungarian lawyer, bioethicist, and author, as well as full professor at the Central European University (CEU), Vienna, Austria. She is also the director of the Center for Ethics and Law in Biomedicine (CELAB) in Budapest. She took a bar exam in Hungary before she conducted legal practice at Simmons & Simmons in London. In 1996, she received her Ph.D. in law and political science at the Hungarian Academy of Sciences.

== Research and education ==
Judit Sándor currently teaches at the Central European University, offering courses on human rights, biopolitics, bioethics, biotechnological law. She had research fellowships at McGill University (Montreal), Maison des sciences de l’homme (Paris), Stanford University (Palo Alto), University of Chicago, and New York University (as a Global Research Fellow).

In September 2005, she founded the Center for Ethics and Law in Biomedicine (CELAB) at the Central European University and has served as its director since then. She has completed twelve European research projects funded by the European Commission, in the fields of biobanks, genetic data, stem cell research, organ transplantation and human reproduction. In October 2019 she won the prestigious Synergy Grant of the European Research Council as one of four principal investigators of an international research team working on an interdisciplinary project uncovering the common European history of the welfare state on both sides of the Iron Curtain after the second world war (Project Leviathan).

== Policy work ==
Judit Sándor had crucial contributions to the development of regulating Patients' rights in Hungary. As one of the founders of the first Patients' Right Organization (Szószóló) in Hungary, she worked out the first Informed consent forms in the country. She is currently a member at the National Ethics Committee for Human Reproduction within the Hungarian Medical Research Council.

She has participated in different national and international legislative, standard setting and policy making activities in the field of biomedical law and bioethics. She took part in the drafting of a comprehensive health care act in Hungary (adopted as Act CLIV of 1997 on Healthcare), and with two molecular biologists she developed the conceptual framework for the Genetic data law in Hungary, which was later transformed into Act of 2008 on the Protection of Human Genetic Data. In November 2023 she served as an expert on bioethics in the case of Dániel Karsai v. Hungary at the European Court of Human Rights.

In 2004–2005 she served as the Chief of the Bioethics Section at UNESCO. In this function she wrote, among other legal documents, the Explanatory Memorandum to the Universal Declaration on Bioethics and Human Rights. She is a member of the International Scientific Advisory Council of the German Reference Centre for Ethics in the Life Sciences (Deutsche Referenzzentrum für Ethik in den Biowissenschaften, DRZE).

She has been a EuroScience Open Forum (ESOF) Programme Committee member since 2017. In September 2018 she was elected as a Governor of the World Association of Medical Law. Since 2024 she had been one of the ambassadors of the Budapest International Documentary Festival (BIDF).

== Publications ==
Judit Sándor has published eleven books in the field of human rights and biomedical law, including Abortusz és jog (Abortion and Law), Gyógyítás és ítélkezés (Medicine and Jurisprudence), Frontiers of the European Health Care Law, Society and Genetic Information, Perfect Copy?, Studies in Biopolitics, Biobanks and Tissue Research, Az én molekulám (My Molecule). She has also contributed to the International Encyclopaedia of Laws series by writing a comprehensive introduction to medical law in Hungary. Her articles and book chapters have been published in several languages, including Hungarian, English, Croatian, Italian, French, and Portuguese. Judit Sándor has recently published peer-reviewed articles on the bioethical and legal aspects of genetic testing, gene therapy, and gene editing, on the bioethical challenges of the Covid pandemic, on the history of decision-making on abortion in Hungary, and the significance of the Karsai v. Hungary case.

She also writes for non-academic audiences on a wide range of topics related to bioethics and biopolitics, human reproduction and gender issues, privacy and data protection. She has a column in the Hungarian weekly Magyar Narancs, titled Testbeszéd (Body Talk), and is a returning contributor to Qubit, an online Hungarian scientific magazine.
