= Idir =

Idir may refer to:

== People ==
- Ali Idir (born 1966), Algerian judoka
- Idir (singer) (1949–2020), Algerian singer-songwriter and musician
- Idir Khourta (born 1986), French-born Algerian table tennis player
- Idir Ouali (born 1988), French-Algerian football player
- Jamel Aït Ben Idir (born 1984), French-Moroccan football player
- Mustafa Ait Idir (born 1970), terrorist
- Thomas Idir or Sinik (born 1980), French-language rap artist

== Places ==
- Idir, Iran (disambiguation)
- Îdir or Iğdır, Turkey
