= Tihamér Margitay =

Hungarian painter

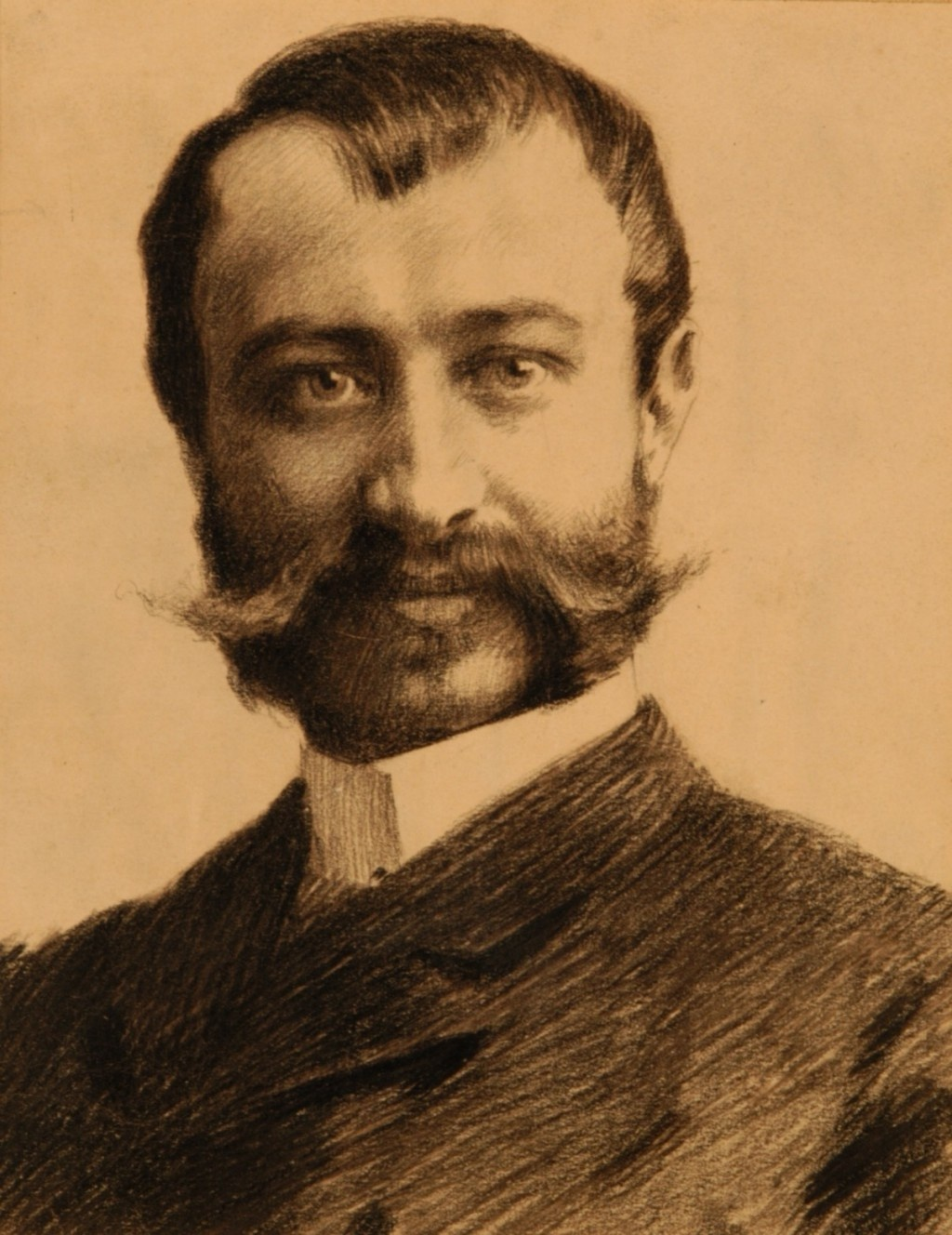
Self-portrait

Tihamér Margitay (1859–1922) was a Hungarian painter. He was born in Jenke, Austria-Hungary, (today Jenkovice, Slovakia). He painted anecdotic, so-called "parlour pictures", in the style of Jules Bastien-Lepage.

== Background ==
Margitay studied in Budapest Margitay liked to paint scenes of the middle-class in the style of Bastien-Lepage with a naturalistic technique. His paintings have been exhibited several times in Budapest and also in Vienna. The Hungarian National Gallery are in possession of some of his paintings and his self-portrait is on exhibition at the Hungarian Historical Gallery.

He studied at the Model Drawing School and Drawing Teacher Training School in Budapest between 1874 and 1879, as a student of Bertalan Székely and Gyula Benczúr and in Munich with O.Seitz. He also studied in Venice and Florence.

In 1879, he continued his studies at the Academy of Fine Arts in Munich, as a state scholarship holder. After his return home, he had the opportunity to appear before the wider public for the first time in 1881, when his work "Római dáridó" was exhibited in the Műcsarnok.

In 1884, he received a state commission to paint a full-length portrait of Palatine József. He gained national popularity with his painting The Irresistible, presented in 1888.

In 1897, he participated in the painting of the monumental panorama of Transylvania. In 1903, an exhibition of his collection was organized by the National Salon.

He ended his life with his own hands.

== Gallery ==
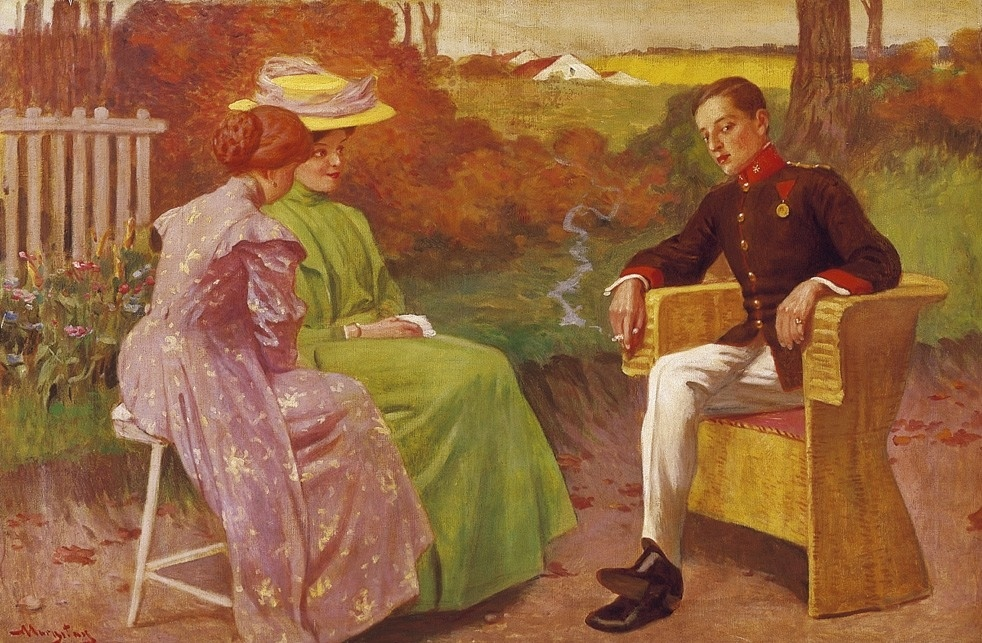
"Where There's Smoke, There's Fire"

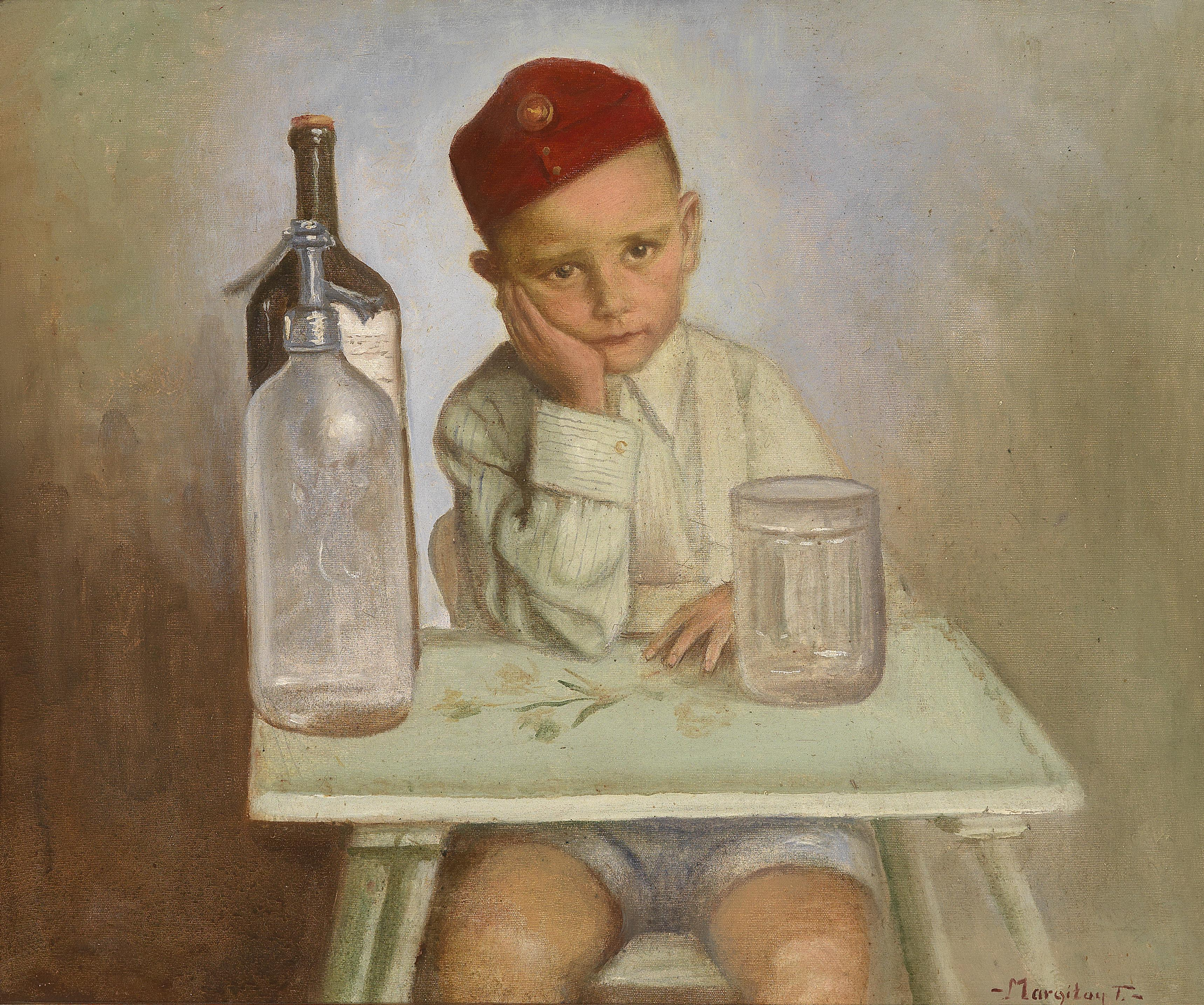
The Hungry Cadet

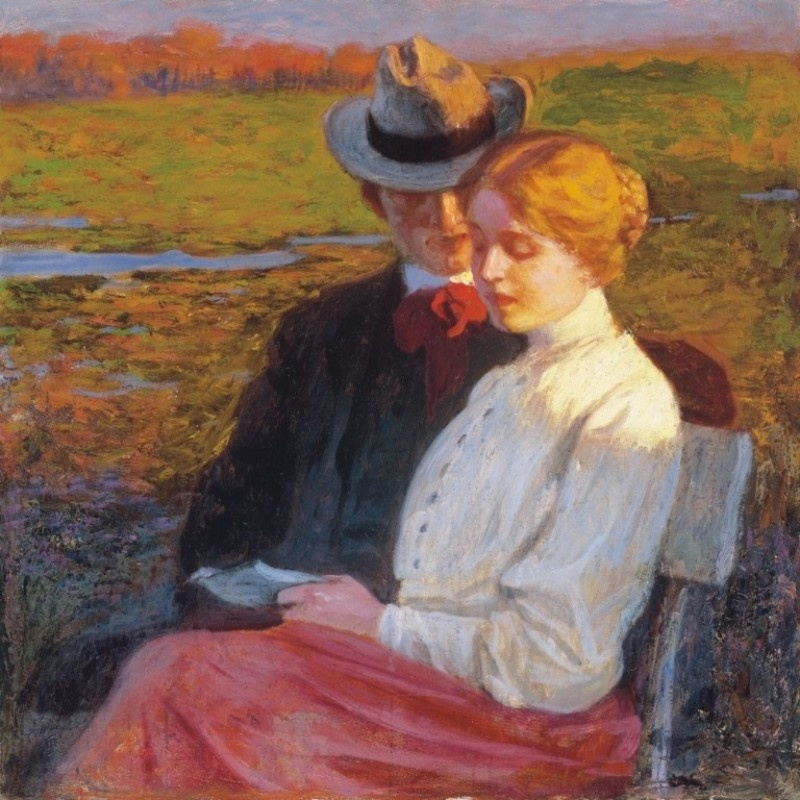
Courtship

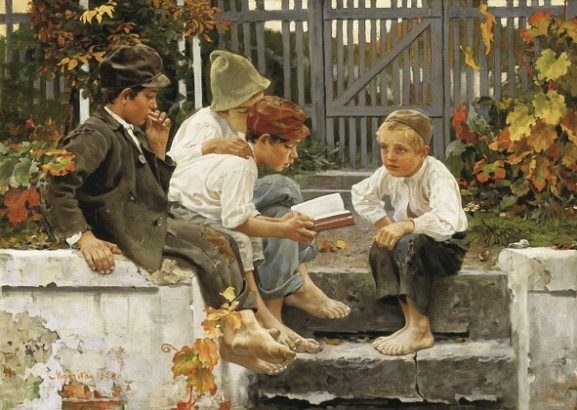
Exciting story

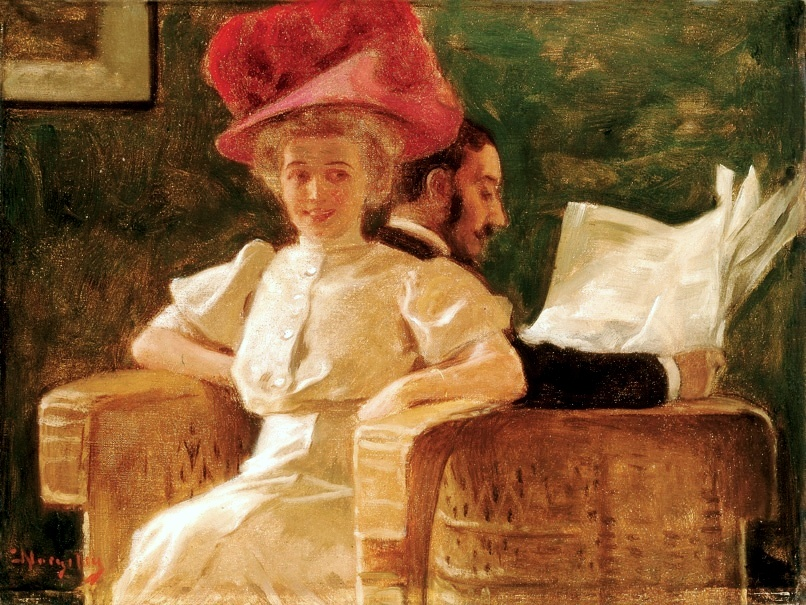
In the Salon
