= Frigyes Helmeczi =

Hungarian ice hockey player

- Born: 19 December 1913; Budapest, Austria-Hungary
- Died: April 1, 1984 (aged 70)
- Position: Forward
- Shot: Left
- Played for: Postás Budapest; MTK Budapest; BBTE Budapest
- National team: Hungary
- Playing career: 1931–1953

Frigyes Helmeczi (19 December 1913 – 1 April 1984) was a Hungarian ice hockey player. He played for the Hungarian national team at the 1936 Winter Olympics and several World Championships.
