= Krisztina =

- Gender: feminine
- Language: Hungarian
- Name day: August 5

Other gender
- Masculine: Krisztián

Origin
- Language: Greek
- Meaning: "follower of Christ"

Other names
- Nicknames: Kriszta, Kriszti
- Cognate: Christina
- Anglicisation: Christina

Krisztina (Hungarian pronunciation: [ˈkristinɒ]) may refer to:

- Krisztina Barta (born 1991), Hungarian ice dancer
- Krisztina Bodri (born 1986), beauty queen who represented Hungary in Miss World 2007 in China
- Krisztina Csáky (1654–1723) Hungarian countess
- Krisztina Czakó (born 1978), former Hungarian figure skater
- Krisztina Egerszegi (born 1974), Hungarian former World Record holding swimmer and Hungarian Olympic champion
- Krisztina Fazekas (born 1980), Hungarian sprint canoeist
- Krisztina Holly, Hungarian American innovator, entrepreneur, and creator of the first TEDx
- Krisztina Morvai (born 1963), Hungarian lawyer and Human Rights lecturer and author
- Krisztina Papp (born 1982), Hungarian long-distance runner
- Krisztina Pigniczki (born 1975), Hungarian team handball player and Olympic medalist
- Krisztina Regőczy (born 1955), former figure skater from Hungary
- Krisztina Sereny (born 1976), professional fitness competitor from Budapest, Hungary
- Krisztina Solti (born 1968), retired Hungarian high jumper
- Krisztina Szabó, Hungarian-Canadian mezzo-soprano
- Krisztina Szremkó (born 1972), female water polo player from Hungary
- Krisztina Tóth (born 1974), Hungarian table tennis player
