= Dénes Lukács (psychologist) =

Dénes Lukács is a Hungarian scholar, teacher, psychologist, and psychoanalyst. He is known for his study on the Szondi test and on Imre Hermann (1889-1984)'s theory of Freudian attachment.

== Works ==
- A " formális választás", mint a gyermek életkori jellegzetességét tükröző próba. Magyar Pszichológiai Szemle, 1982 : Abstract 1. Investigated I. Hermann's (1921, 1923) findings that when children choose objects placed in a row according to formal aspects, Ss less than 5 yrs of age take objects from the edge; while children aged 5 yrs and older choose objects from the middle row.
- Anklammerung–Zirkularität: Hermann und Szondi: Abstract 1 The monkey child was separated from the mother and housed in a separate cage, where there was a wire imitation mother holding a milk bottle and a second fur imitation, but with no food
- Fate analysis and the Szondi test: instruments suitable to explore multiplex personality: Abstract : According to Szondi fate is such an integration of the ancestor's life and the person's own life which is chosen by the ego of the given person and with which the individual identifies (Szondi, 1954).
