= Gergely Luthár =

Slovene landowner, notary and writer

Gergely Luthár (Prekmurje Slovene: Gergel Lutar, Slovene: Gregor Lutar, February 18, 1841 Sebeborci – March 12, 1925 Sebeborci) was a Slovene landowner, notary, and writer in Hungary.

He was born in Sebeborci to a Lutheran family. His parents János Luthár and Rozina Berke (from Križevci) were petty nobility. He attended school in Puconci and married Anna Obál in Tešanovci.

Luthár was the notary of Puconci, and he retired in 1887. Luthár and Mihály Kolossa reworked and published in a new version of István Szijjártó's Mrtvecsne peszmi (Dirges) in Prekmurje Slovene, titled Mrtvecsne peszmi stere szo szti sztári piszm vküp pobráne, pobougsane ino na haszek szlovenszkoga národa zdaj obdrügics na szvetlost dáne po Luthár Gergelyi i Kolossa Mihályi Szembiborczi sztoécsiva (Dirges, Which Are All Old Songs Gathered Together, Improved, and Republished for the Benefit of the Slovenian People by Gergely Luthár and Mihály Kolossa in Sebeborci, 1887). He died in Sebeborci.

== See also ==
- List of Slovene writers and poets in Hungary

== Literature ==
- Ivan Škafar: Bibliografija prekmurskih tiskov od 1715 do 1919, Ljubljana 1978.
