= Ágoston =

Ágoston or Agoston is a surname and given name. Notable people with the name include:

== Given name ==
- Ágoston Pável (1886–1946), Hungarian Slovene writer, poet, ethnologist, linguist, and historian
- Agoston Haraszthy (1812–1869), Hungarian-American traveler, writer, town-builder, and pioneer winemaker in Wisconsin and California

== Surname ==
- András Ágoston, ethnic Hungarian politician in Serbia and leader of the Democratic Party of Vojvodina Hungarians
- Emil Agoston (1876–1921), Hungarian architect
- Péter Ágoston (1874–1925), Hungarian politician, served as Minister of Foreign Affairs in 1919
