= Ivett =

Female given name

- Name day: May 6

Origin
- Origin: Hungary

Other names
- Derived: Yvette (French)

Ivett is a given name of Hungarian origin that is the equivalent of the French Yvette.

== People ==
- Ivett Gonda (born 1986), Canadian taekwondoer
