= Rezső =

Given name

Rezső (Hungarian: [ˈrɛʒøː]) is a Hungarian masculine given name. It may refer to:

- Rezső Bálint (painter) (1885–1945), Hungarian painter known for his landscape paintings
- Rezső Bálint (physician) (1874–1929), Austro-Hungarian neurologist and psychiatrist who discovered Balint's syndrome
- Rezső Crettier (born 1878), Hungarian track and field athlete
- Rezső Kende (1908–2011), Hungarian gymnast who competed at the 1928 Summer Olympics in Amsterdam
- Rezső Nyers (1923–2018), former Hungarian politician, who served as Minister of Finance between 1960 and 1962
- Rezső Seress IPA (1889–1968), Hungarian pianist and composer
- Rezső Somlai (born 1911), Hungarian footballer, who was in Hungary squad at the 1934 FIFA World Cup
- Rezső Sugár (1919–1988), Hungarian composer
- Rezső von Bartha (1912–2001), Hungarian fencer and modern pentathlete
- Rezső Wanié (1908–1986), Hungarian swimmer
