= Hajnalka =

- Gender: Female
- Language: Hungarian
- Name day: 27 March

Origin
- Region of origin: Hungary

Hajnalka is a Hungarian feminine given name originating from the 19th century. It is made up of the word hajnal ("dawn") and the diminutive suffix -ka. Notable people with the given name include:

- Hajnalka Sipos (born 1972), Hungarian footballer
- Hajnalka Futaki (born 1990), Hungarian handball player
- Hajnalka Juhász (born 1980), Hungarian politician
- Hajnalka Tóth (born 1976), Hungarian fencer
- Hajnalka Kiraly-Picot (born 1971), Hungarian fencer
