= Mariann =

Mariann is a female given name derived from Maria, similar to Marianne, Mariana and Marian. It may refer to:

- Mariann Aalda (born 1948), American actress
- Mariann Ambrus (1956–2007), Hungarian rower
- Mariann Bienz, British molecular biologist
- Mariann Birkedal (born 1987), Norwegian beauty queen
- Mariann Budde (born 1959), American bishop
- Mariann Byerwalter, American businesswoman
- Mariann Domonkos, Canadian table tennis player
- Mariann Fischer Boel (born 1943), Danish politician
- Mariann Gajhede Knudsen (born 1984), Danish footballer
- Mariann Horváth (born 1968), Hungarian épée fencer
- Mariann Jelinek (born 1942), American organizational theorist
- Mariann Mayberry, American actress
- Mariann Stratton (born 1945), Director of the United States Navy Nurse Corps
- Mariann Thomassen, Norwegian singer
- Mariann Ytterberg (born 1941), Swedish politician

== See also ==
- Mariann Grammofon, record label
