= Virág =

Virág is a Hungarian surname and feminine given name, meaning ’flower’ in Hungarian.

Notable people with the name include:

== Surname ==
- Bálint Virág (born 1973), Hungarian mathematician
- Béla Virág (born 1976), Hungarian footballer

== Given name ==
- Virág Csurgó (born 1972), Hungarian tennis player
- Virág Németh (born 1985), Hungarian tennis player
- Virág Vaszari (born 1986), Hungarian handball player

== In fiction ==
- Lipóti Virag, Leopold Bloom's grandfather in James Joyce's Ulysses.
