= Gusztáv =

Gusztáv is the Hungarian variant of the given name Gustav and may refer to:

- Gusztáv Batthyány (1803–1883), Hungarian nobleman who bred horses in England where he was commonly known as Count Batthyány
- Gusztáv Gratz (1875–1946), Hungarian politician, who served as Minister of Foreign Affairs in 1921
- Gusztáv Hennyey (1888–1977), Hungarian politician and military officer, who served as Minister of Foreign Affairs in 1944 for a month
- Gusztáv Leikep (born 1966), Hungarian sprint canoeist who competed in the late 1980s and early 1990s
- Gusztáv Lifkai (born 1912), Hungarian field hockey player who competed in the 1936 Summer Olympics
- Gusztáv Nemeskéri (born 1960), Hungarian serial killer
- Gusztáv Sebes (born 1906), Hungarian footballer and coach
- Gusztáv Vitéz Jány (1883–1947), Hungarian officer during World War II
- Gusztáv, Hungarian series of animated short cartoons
