= Tamás Varga =

Tamás Varga may refer to:

- Tamás Varga (rower) (born 1978), Hungarian rower
- Tamás Varga (water polo) (born 1975), Hungarian water polo player
