= Mihály Szeróvay =

Hungarian footballer (born 1982)

Personal information
- Date of birth: 14 May 1982 (age 44)
- Place of birth: Budapest, Hungary
- Height: 1.82 m (5 ft 11 1/2 in)
- Position: Goalkeeper

Youth career
- 1999–2001: BFC
- 2001–2003: Ferencvárosi TC

Senior career*
Years	Team	Apps	(Gls)
2003–2005	Erzsébeti Spartacus MTK LE	16	(0)
2005–2007	BKV Előre SC	36	(0)
2007	Atletico Vallbonense	32	(0)
2008–2012	JJK Jyväskylä	62	(0)
2012	→ FC Haka (loan)	3	(0)
2012	→ Hämeenlinna (loan)	1	(0)
- * Club domestic league appearances and goals

Mihály Szeróvay (born 14 May 1982) is a Hungarian former football player.
