= Zsombor =

- Gender: Male
- Name day: 8 November

Origin
- Region of origin: Hungary

Zsombor is a Hungarian masculine given name and may refer to:

- Zsombor Berecz (born 1986), Hungarian sport sailor
- Zsombor Berecz, (born 1995), Hungarian footballer
- Zsombor Borhi (fl. 1990s), Hungarian sprint canoer
- Zsombor Deak (born 1989), Romanian triathlete
- Zsombor Garát (born 1997), Hungarian ice hockey player
- Zsombor Jéger (born 1991), Hungarian actor
- Zsombor Kerekes (born 1973), Hungarian footballer
- Zsombor Piros (born 1999), Hungarian tennis player
- Zsombor Tamási (born 2002), Hungarian canoeist
- Zsombor Veress (born 1999), Romanian footballer
