= Ipoly =

Ipoly may refer to:

- Ipeľ (Hungarian: Ipoly), a tributary of the Danube river in Slovakia and Hungary
- International Polytechnic High School, in Pomona, California, United States
