= Dömötör =

Dömötör or Domotor may refer to:

- Csaba Dömötör (born 1982), Hungarian international relations expert and politician
- Dömötör-Kolompár criminal organization in Canada
- Dömötör Tower in Szeged, Hungary
- Dörmögő Dömötör, a fictional bear
- Louis Domotor (born 1943), Canadian farmer and political figure
- Mihály Dömötör (1875–1962), Hungarian politician
- Ryan Domotor, Canadian politician
- Zoltán Dömötör (1935–2019), Hungarian swimmer and water polo player
