= Gyárfás =

Gyárfás is a Hungarian surname. Some known people bearing this name are:

- András Gyárfás, Hungarian mathematician
- Jenő Gyárfás, Hungarian painter

== See also ==
- Gyárfás-patak, the Hungarian name for the Ghiorfaş Creek, a tributary of the Mureș river in Romania
- Ileana Gyarfaş, Romanian gymnast
