= Eszter =

Eszter is a female Hungarian given name of Hebrew origin (from Esther).

it may refer to:

- Eszter Balint (born 1966), singer, violinist, and actress
- Eszter Csákányi (born 1953), Hungarian actress
- Eszter Hargittai (born 1973), communication scholar at the University of Zurich
- Eszter Hollosi, Budapest-born actress and director
- Eszter Krutzler (born 1981), female weightlifter from Hungary
- Eszter Mátéfi (born 1966), Hungarian handball player who competed in the 1996 Summer Olympics
- Eszter Mattioni (1902–1993), prominent twentieth century Hungarian painter
- Eszter Rasztótsky, Hungarian sprint canoeist who has competed in the early 2000s
- Eszter Tamási (1938–1991), Hungarian TV announcer and actress
