= Basil Ede =

English painter

- Born: 12 February 1931
- Died: 29 September 2016 (aged 85)
- Known for: Wildlife Artist

Basil Ede (12 February 1931—29 September 2016) was an English wildlife artist specialising in avian portraiture, noted for the ornithological precision of his paintings.

== Early life ==
Basil Ede was born 12 February 1931 in Surrey. Ede's interest in drawing began early in life. As a schoolboy growing up during the Second World War, he filled his exercise books with sketches of military aircraft and caricatures of his school teachers. He was educated at St John's School, Leatherhead. He later attended Kingston School of Art. However, in 1949, he was called up for military service in the British Army.

Initially he trained as a Gunner with The Royal Artillery, but after being selected to attend the Mons Officer Cadet School he was commissioned into the RASC, serving as Second Lieutenant and then Lieutenant . On leaving the army at the end of 1951, Ede joined the Merchant Navy, and he set sail on his maiden voyage as a purser on board Orient Line's Empire Orwell in early 1952. The ship's established route was between Southampton and Japan, via Suez, Aden, Columbo, Hong Kong, Singapore and Pusan. In addition to these duties, the ship was at this time deployed to help transport British troops and equipment to and from the Korean War. Ede was to become fascinated by the Far East and in particular by its art. This was undoubtedly to have an influence on his later work. Coming ashore for good, Ede joined Cunard Line as a young executive in 1956. By now he spent most of his spare time painting and negotiating with galleries and publishers. His employers, far from being annoyed, actually commissioned him to design a series of covers for their first class menu cards on the RMS Queen Elizabeth and RMS Queen Mary. In 1964 Ede left Cunard and became a full time artist.

== Career ==
The first one-man exhibition of Basil Ede's work was held at the Rowland Ward Gallery in London in 1958. Further one man exhibitions followed at London's Tryon Gallery in 1960 and 1962.

In 1964, Ede became the first living artist to be honoured with a one-man show at the National Collection of Fine Arts, Washington D.C. The event was sponsored by the British Embassy, the English Speaking Union and the National Audubon Society.

In 1965, Ede's first book, "Birds of Town and Village" was published by Country Life Books, featuring thirty six plates of his work in full colour. The publication features a foreword written by Prince Philip, Duke of Edinburgh and text by ornithologist W. D. Campbell, republished by Chartwell Books in 2004.

In 1966, 1971 and 1979 one man exhibitions of Ede's work were held at the Kennedy Galleries in New York. In 1971 Ede was commissioned by Walter Annenberg, then serving as United States Ambassador to the Court of St. James, to paint a series of eastern Pennsylvanian birds for his private collection. Also in 1971, a chance encounter with another American collector, Jack Warner, led to the commissioning of "The Wild Birds of America" series. Described as a "very ambitious project", the commission was to paint every species of wild bird in North America, 650 in all, in life size. Robert McCracken Peck, in his essay "Four Centuries of Avian Portraiture", says that the project "...has been compared in scope to John James Audubon's twenty eight year effort to document and celebrate the birds of North America", but adds, "so limited a comparison fails to put into proper perspective the much larger tradition of bird painting in America with which both Audubon and Ede are intimately interlinked." The project was cut short in 1989, after Ede suffered a serious illness. However, a total of ninety five life sized portraits of North American birds, in watercolour, were completed for the collection by Ede, between 1975 and 1989. Today they form part of the Warner Art Collection in the United States. In 1991, the book "Wild birds of America - the Art of Basil Ede" was published by Harry N. Abrams, featuring 103 colour reproductions from the Wild Birds of America series, as well as reproductions from Ede's field notes and sketches. In his foreword, Prince Philip, himself a collector of Ede's work, ranked the English painter among the world's great wildlife artists.

== Later career ==
Following a severe stroke in 1989, Ede was left with his right arm paralysed and taught himself to paint with his left hand instead. "I lost the use of my right side completely and I couldn't speak." he later told Nigel Reynolds in an interview for The Daily Telegraph in November 1999. He switched his chosen medium from watercolour to oils. Within a year he was once again painting competently and within three he was able to paint in considerable detail. In May 1992, some of Ede's new works in oils were exhibited at the Tryon and Morland Gallery in London as part of their "Twenty years in Cork Street" show. Also in 1992, Ede was honoured with a "Lifetime Achievement Award" by the Southeastern Wildlife Exposition in Charleston, South Carolina. In July 1993, the Wimborne Arts Festival (Dorset, UK) chose to honour Ede with a one-man exhibition of his work in oils.

Basil Ede was one of the founder members of the Society of Wildlife Artists and a life member and active supporter of the Royal Society for the Protection of Birds.

Basil Ede died on 29 September 2016, at the age of eighty five, following a short illness, survived by his wife, and two sons.

== Books ==
- Birds of Town and Village (Country Life Books 1965, Octopus Publishing Group Ltd 2004 - reprinted 2006, 2007, 2009)
- Basil Ede's Birds (Severn House Publications & Van Nostrand Reinholt Inc. 1980, Hamlyn Paperbacks edition 1982)
- Wild Birds of America - The Art of Basil Ede (Abrams, New York, 1991)

== Exhibitions ==
=== One Man Shows ===
- The Rowland Ward Gallery, London, 1958
- The Tryon Gallery, London, 1960, 1962, 1964, 1965, 1968, 1975, 1980
- The National Collection of Fine Arts, Washington DC, 1964
- Kennedy Galleries, New York, 1966, 1971, 1979
- The Gibbs Art Museum, Charleston, South Carolina, 1979
- The Hibernian Hall, Charleston, South Carolina, 1984
- The Palm Springs Desert Museum, California, 1987
- The Wimborne Arts Festival, Dorset, United Kingdom, 1993

=== Major joint exhibitions ===
- The Pieter Wenning Gallery, Johannesburg, South Africa, 1966
- The Cumner Art Museum, Jacksonville, Florida, 1987
- The Tryon Gallery, London, 1988
- The Tryon and Morland Gallery, London, 1992
- Rountree Tryon Galleries, London, 2017

=== Permanent exhibitions ===
- The Warner Art Collection, Tuscaloosa, Alabama, USA
- The Ulster Museum, Belfast, Northern Ireland
