= Bulcsú =

Bulcsú (Hungarian pronunciation: [ˈbult͡ʃuː]) may refer to:

- Bulcsú (chieftain), 10th-century Magyar leader
- Bulcsú Lád, 13th-century Hungarian bishop and nobleman
- Bulcsú Hoppál (born 1974), Hungarian theologian and philosopher
- Bulcsú Székely (born 1976), Hungarian water polo player
- Bulcsú Révész (born 2007), Hungarian snooker player
