= Mária =

- Gender: feminine
- Language: Hungarian, Slovak
- Name day: August 15, September 8

Other gender
- Masculine: Márió, Mário

Origin
- Language: Hebrew/Latin
- Meaning: bitter", "beloved", "rebelliousness", "wished-for child", "marine", “drop of the sea”

Other names
- Nicknames: Mari, Marika, Marica
- Cognate: Maria
- Anglicisation: Mary
- Related names: Mirjam, Miriam

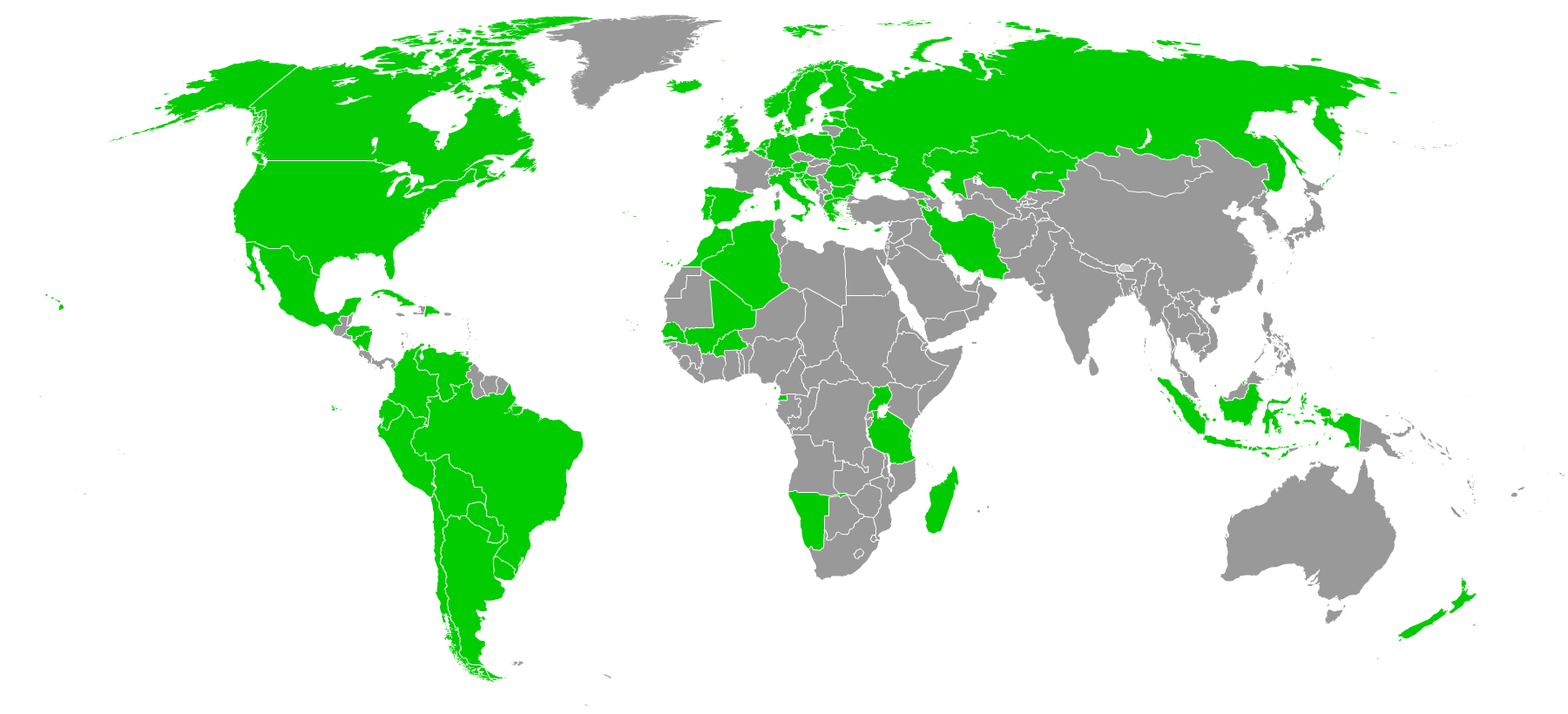
Popularity of name Maria

Mária is a Hungarian and Slovak form of Maria (given name) or Mary (given name).

As of December 2020, Mária is the most common female given name in Slovakia. With over 193 thousands Slovak women bearing the name, it has a substantial lead over the second most popular name Anna (138 thousands).

- The name is found in the Mária Valéria Bridge between Hungary and Slovakia on the middle of the bridge named after Archduchess Marie Valerie of Austria and may refer to:
- Mária Balážová, (born 1956), Slovak painter
- Mária Bartuszová, (1936–1996), Slovak sculptor
- Mária Čírová, (born 1988), Slovak singer
- Mária Festetics (1839–1923), Austro-Hungarian Countess
- Mária Frank (1943–1992), Hungarian swimmer
- Mária Janák (born 1958), Hungarian javelin thrower
- Mari Jászai (1850–1926), Hungarian actress
- Mária Kráľovičová (1927–2022), Slovak actress
- Mária Lázár (1895–1983), Hungarian actress
- Mária Littomeritzky (1927–2017), Hungarian butterfly swimmer
- Mária Mednyánszky (1901–1978), Hungarian international table tennis star
- Mária Mezei (1909–1983), Hungarian actress
- Mária Pap (born 1955), Hungarian athlete
- Marika Rökk (1913–2004), Hungarian dancer, singer and actress
- Mária Sabolová (born 1956), Slovak politician
- Mária Schmidt (born 1953), Hungarian historian and university lecturer
- Mária Spoločníková (1926–2004), Slovak art restored and painter
- Mária Sulyok (1908–1987), Hungarian actress
- Mária Szepes (1908–2007), Hungarian author
- Mária Tasnádi Fekete (1911–2001), Hungarian singer, stage and film actress
- Mária Temesi (born 1957), Hungarian operatic soprano
- Mari Törőcsik (1935–2021), Hungarian stage and film actress
- Mária Trošková (born 1987), Slovak model
- Mária Vadász (1950–2009), Hungarian handball player
- Mária Wittner (1937–2022), Hungarian revolutionary and politician
- Mária Zakariás (born 1952), Hungarian sprint canoer
- Mary of Hungary (1257–1323), daughter of Stephen V of Hungary
- Maria of Anjou (1371–1395) Queen of Hungary and Croatia
