= Eszter Hollosi =

Austrian stage and film actor

Eszter Hollosi is a Budapest, Hungary-born, Vienna, Austria-reared stage and film actress, and director.

== Training and career ==
She trained with the Royal Shakespeare Company (UK), the Theatre of the Oppressed (Brazil), the Gardzienitze (Poland), the Teatr Piesn Kozla (Poland) and El Instituto del Teatro (Barcelona, Spain). She earned her degree in European Theatre Arts from London's Rose Bruford College.

She made her Austrian stage debut in My Children! My Africa!. She appeared in the Italian short film, Goddess, and the Austrian feature film, Oh Fortuna.
