= Domonkos =

Domonkos is a Hungarian given name and surname.

Notable people with this surname include:

- Domonkos Ferjancsik (born 1975), Hungarian fencer
- Domonkos Széll (born 1989), Hungarian rower
- László Domonkos (1886–1956), Hungarian footballer
- Mariann Domonkos (born 1958), Hungarian table tennis player
- Pál Domonkos (1908–1964), Hungarian rower

== See also ==
- Dominic (archbishop of Esztergom)
