= Ambrus =

Ambrus may refer to:

- Ambrus (name)
- Ambrus, Lot-et-Garonne, a commune in the Lot-et-Garonne department in France
- Ambrus, Ivančna Gorica, a settlement in the Municipality of Ivančna Gorica in Slovenia

== See also ==
- Ambros (disambiguation)
