= Mária Sabolová =

Slovak politician (born 1956)

Member of the Slovak National Council
- In office 3 November 1994 – 4 April 2012

Personal details
- Born: 20 September 1956 (age 70) Prešov, Czechoslovakia
- Party: Christian Democratic Movement
- Education: Technical University of Košice

Mária Sabolová (born 20 September 1956) is a Slovak politician. She served as a Member of the National Council of Slovakia from 1994 to 2012.

== Early life ==
Mária Sabolová was born on 20 September 1956 in Prešov. She graduated in electrical engineering at the Technical University of Košice in 1980.

== Political career ==
Sabolová was among the founding members of the Christian Democratic Movement (KDH) in 1990. In 1994 she was elected an MP of the National Council, a post she held for 17 years. As an MP, she was mainly engaged in healthcare topics. Notably, she long fought for the right of patients to see specialists without a referral from general practitioners. In 2002 she was offered a post in the government, which she turned down opting to focus on her parliamentary work. Following the failure of KDH to pass the representation threshold in the 2012 Slovak parliamentary election, Sabolová retired from politics.
