= Szilvia =

Szilvia is the Hungarian spelling of the name Silvia. It may refer to:

- Szilvia Bertha (born 1977), Hungarian politician
- Szilvia Gogh, Hungarian scuba diver and stunt performer
- Szilvia Mednyánszky (born 1971), Hungarian sprint canoeist
- Szilvia Péter Szabó (born 1982), the singer of the Hungarian band NOX
- Szilvia Szabó (born 1978), Hungarian sprint canoeist
- Szilvia Sunyovszky (born 1948), Hungarian actress
