= Katalin Kelemen =

First female rabbi in Hungary

Katalin Kelemen is the first female rabbi in Hungary, where she was born. She studied for the rabbinate at Leo Baeck College in England, and was ordained in 1998. On March 7, 1999, she was inducted as the rabbi of the Sim Shalom Progressive Jewish Congregation in Budapest, Hungary. In 1999 she also attended a conference sponsored by Bet Debora, a Jewish women's initiative founded in 1998.
