= Győző =

Győző is a masculine Hungarian given name. It is the Hungarian translation of Victor: győző ("conqueror"), győz ("to conquer") + -ő ("present participle suffix"). It was created during the Hungarian language reform that took place in the 18th–19th centuries. It may refer to:

- Győző Burcsa (born 1954), Hungarian football player
- Győző Czigler (1850–1905), Hungarian architect and academic
- Győző Exner (1864–1945), Hungarian chess master
- Győző Forintos (1935–2018), Hungarian chess master and by profession, an economist
- Győző Haberfeld (1889–1945), Hungarian gymnast
- Győző Kulcsár (1940–2018), Hungarian fencer and olympic champion in épée competition
- Győző Martos (born 1949), Hungarian football player
- Győző Vásárhelyi (1906–1997), Hungarian-French artist, widely accepted as a "grandfather" and leader the Op art movement
