= Fülöp, Hungary =

Coordinates: 47°36′N 22°04′E

Fülöp
- Interactive map of Fülöp
- Country: Hungary
- County: Hajdú-Bihar

Area
  - Total: 55.95 km^{2} (21.60 sq mi)

Population (2015)
  - Total: 1,748
  - Density: 31.3/km^{2} (81/sq mi)
- Time zone: UTC+1 (CET)
  - Summer (DST): UTC+2 (CEST)
- Postal code: 4266
- Area code: 52

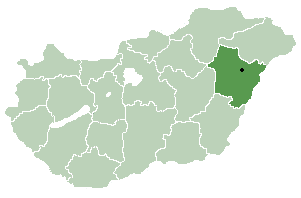
Location of Hajdú-Bihar county in Hungary

Fülöp is a village in Hajdú-Bihar county, in the Northern Great Plain region of eastern Hungary.

== Geography ==
It covers an area of 55.95 km^{2} (22 sq mi) and has a population of 1748 people (2015).
