= Zelma =

Zelma may refer to:

== Places ==
=== Australia ===
- Zelma, Queensland, a town in the Mackay Region

=== United States ===
- Zelma, Indiana, unincorporated community in Pleasant Run Township, Lawrence County, Indiana

=== Canada ===
- Zelma, Saskatchewan, a hamlet in Saskatchewan
- Zelma Reservoir, a reservoir in Saskatchewan

== Fictional characters ==
- The Groovy Girls doll line, by Manhattan Toy, features a doll named Zelma.

== Organizations ==
- Zelma Hutsell Elementary School, public primary school in Katy, Texas, United States
