= Szilárd =

Szilárd or Szilard [ˈsilaːrd] is a Hungarian given name or surname. It is a Hungarian version (literary translation) of the name Constantine. It may refer to:

== People ==
=== First name ===
- Szilárd Bogdánffy (1911–1953), Hungarian Roman Catholic bishop
- Szilárd Borbély (1963–2014), Hungarian writer
- Szilárd Devecseri (born 1990), Hungarian football player
- Szilárd Éles (born 1987), Hungarian football player
- Szilárd Keresztes (born 1932), Hungarian Greek Catholic bishop
- Szilárd Németh (footballer) (born 1977), Slovak football player
- Szilárd Németh (politician) (born 1964), Hungarian politician
- Szilárd Tóth (born 1973), Hungarian ice dancer

=== Surname ===
- Leo Szilard (1898–1964), Hungarian physicist

== Other uses ==
- 38442 Szilárd, main belt asteroid discovered in 1999
- Einstein–Szilard letter, sent to Franklin Roosevelt in 1939
- Einstein–Szilárd refrigerator or Einstein refrigerator, a type of absorption refrigerator with no moving parts
- Szilard (crater)
- Szilárd petition
