= Mihály Kolossa =

Slovene ploughman and writer (1846–1906)

Mihály Kolossa (Slovene: Mihael Kološa; September 21, 1846 – September 3, 1906) was a Slovene ploughman and writer in Hungary.

He was born in Puconci, his father was from Sebeborci, and mother, Éva Skrilec, was from Tešanovci. His wife was Terézia Fartély.

Kolossa and the notary of Puconci, Gergely Luthár, reworked and published the new issue of the Lutheran collection of dirges Mrtvecsne peszmi in the Prekmurje Slovene in 1887. The original author of the book was István Szijjártó.

Kolossa died from tuberculosis and was buried in Sebeborci.

== Literature ==
- Ivan Škafar: Bibliografija prekmurskih tiskov od 1715 do 1919, Ljubljana 1978.

== See also ==
- List of Slovene writers and poets in Hungary
