= Elemér =

- Gender: Male
- Language: Hungarian
- Name day: 28 February

Origin
- Region of origin: Hungary

Elemér is a masculine given name, the Hungarian form of the Slavic Velimir. Notable people with the given name include:

- Elemér Berkessy (1905–1993), Hungarian footballer and coach
- Elemér Bokor (1887–1928), Hungarian entomologist
- Elemér Csák (1944–2025), Hungarian journalist and politician
- Elemér Gergátz (born 1942), Hungarian politician, former Minister of Agriculture
- Elemér Gorondy-Novák (1885–1954), Hungarian military officer
- Elemér Gyulai (1904–1945), Hungarian composer
- Elemér Hankiss (1928–2015), Hungarian sociologist and educator
- Elemér Kiss (born 1944), Hungarian jurist and politician
- Elemér Kocsis (1910–1981), Romanian footballer
- Elemér Kondás (born 1963), Hungarian footballer and football manager
- Elemér Pászti (1889–1965), Hungarian gymnast and 1912 Olympic competitor
- Elemér Somfay (1898–1979), Hungarian track & field athlete and 1924 and 1932 Olympic competitor
- Elemér Szathmáry (1926–1971), Hungarian swimmer and 1948 Olympic silver medalist
- Elemér Terták (1918–1999), Hungarian figure skater and 1936 Olympic competitor
- Elemér Thury (1874–1944), Hungarian film actor
