= Tünde =

- Gender: Female

Origin
- Origin: Hungarian
- Meaning: "fairy"

Tünde [ˈtyndɛ] is a Hungarian feminine given name, derived from Hungarian tündér meaning "fairy". This name was coined by the Hungarian poet Mihály Vörösmarty in the 19th century in his work Csongor és Tünde (Csongor and Tünde).

With Csongor and Tünde, Vörösmarty has given new life to the fairy-tale forest whose last visitor was Shakespeare. Moving on Vörösmarty’s stage are fairies, imps, witches and cosmic deities. This fairy world naturally performs its dance on the poet’s magic carpet of language. (Antal Szerb)

June 1 is the Hungarian name day for Tünde.

Tünde is also used for the translation of "elf" in Tolkien's works.

People with the name "Tünde" include:

- Tünde Csonkics (b. 1958) chess player, woman grandmaster
- Tünde Frankó (b. 1966) opera singer
- Tünde Handó (b. 1962) jurist
- Tünde Kara (1974–2019), Hungarian actress
- Tünde Kiszel (b. 1959) model, reporter, tabloid celeb
- Tünde Majsai-Nyilas (b. 1974) actress
- Tünde Murányi (b. 1966) actress
- Mária Tünde Novák (b. 1979/80) bank robber, author, "the Bonnie Parker of Hungary"
- Tünde Nyilas handball player
- Tünde Semmi-Kis (b. 1985) Miss World Hungary winner, stunt double
- Tünde Szabó (b. 1974) swimmer, politician
- Tünde Szabó (b. 1989) long-distance runner
- Tünde Vaszi (b. 1972) Olympic longjumper
- Tünde Bartha (b. 1976)
- Tünde Bornemisza (b. 2000) Artist

Czech state official of Hungarian origin

== See also ==
- Tunde, unisex Yoruba name
