= Gyöngyi =

- Gender: feminine
- Language: Hungarian
- Name day: October 23

Origin
- Language: Hungarian
- Meaning: "pearl"

Other names
- Anglicisation: Pearl
- Related names: Gyöngy, Gyöngyvér, Margit

Gyöngyi, Gyöngyvér, or Gyöngyvirág are Hungarian feminine given names.

They come from the Hungarian word, gyöngy, which means pearl. Gyöngyvirág means "lily of the valley" and Gyöngyvér was created from "gyöngy" and "testvér" (meaning "sister"), whereas Gyöngyi is a short form of either, or a nickname.

== People with the given name Gyöngyi ==
- Gyöngyi Salla, singer, musician, performing artist also known as Ziaflow
- Gyöngyi Szalay-Horváth (1968–2017), Hungarian fencer
