= Boldizsár =

- Gender: Male
- Language: Hungarian
- Name day: 6 January

Origin
- Region of origin: Hungary

Other names
- Related names: Balthazar

Boldizsár is both a Hungarian masculine given name and surname. It is a cognate of the Biblical name Balthazar. Individuals bearing the name Boldizsár include:

Given name

- Boldizsár Báthory (1560–1594), Transylvanian politician
- Boldizsár Bodor (born 1982), Hungarian footballer
- Boldizsár Csiky (born 1937), Romanian composer
- Boldizsár Horvát (1822–1898), Hungarian politician, poet, and novelist
- Boldizsár Kiss (born 1985), Hungarian swimmer

Surname

- Gáspár Boldizsár, Hungarian sprint canoer
- Iván Boldizsár (1912–1988), Hungarian journalist, writer, and editor
