= Nikolett =

Nikolett is a given name. Notable people with the name include:

- Nikolett Brigovácz (born 1977), Hungarian handball player
- Nikolett Diószegi (born 1996), Hungarian handballer
- Nikolett Kovács, Hungarian Grand Prix motorcycle racer
- Nikolett Krausz (born 1981), Hungarian former artistic gymnast
- Nikolett Listár (born 1983), Hungarian sprinter
- Nikolett Pádár (born 2006), Hungarian competitive swimmer
- Nikolett Szabó (born 1980), javelin thrower from Hungary
- Nikolett Szabó (judoka) (born 1979), retired Hungarian Paralympic judoka
- Nikolett Szepesi (born 1987), Hungarian swimmer from Budapest
- Nikolett Szilágyi (born 2005), Hungarian artistic gymnast
- Nikolett Tóth (born 2001), Hungarian handballer

== See also ==
- Nicollet
- Nicolette
