= Acta Botanica Islandica =

- Discipline: Botany
- Language: English
- Edited by: Guðríður Gyða Eyjólfsdóttir

Publication details
- Former name: Flóra
- History: 1972-2019
- Publisher: Natural Science Institute of Iceland (Iceland)
- Frequency: Irregular

Standard abbreviations
- ISO 4: Acta Bot. Isl.

Indexing
- ISSN: 0374-5066
- LCCN: 74647314
- OCLC no.: 689815956
- Flóra
- LCCN: 83645313
- OCLC no.: 752460312

Links
- Journal homepage

Acta Botanica Islandica was a scientific journal of botany published by the Natural Science Institute of Iceland in, and about, Iceland. It was established in 1972. The journal ceased to be published in 2011, but a 16th and last issue was published in 2019. It was primarily an English language publication, but some papers in French and German were published.

== History ==
Acta replaced the botany journal Flóra which was published between 1963 and 1968. It addressed a lack of publications in Iceland about Icelandic botany. The first editor was Hörður Kristinsson.
