= Jolan =

Jolan or Jolán is a given name, female in Magyar (Hungarian), it is the Hungarian version of the female given name Jolanda. Notable people with the name include :

- Jolan (singer) (born 1993), English singer
- Jolan Babus (1917–1967), Hungarian ethnographer and teacher
- Jolan Chang (1917–2002), Chinese-Canadian sexologist and Taoist philosopher
- Jolán Földes (1902–1963), Hungarian author
- Jolan Gross-Bettelheim, Hungarian graphics artist
- Jolán Kleiber-Kontsek (born 1939), Hungarian athlete who mainly competed in the discus throw event

== See also ==
- Golan (disambiguation)
