= Boglárka =

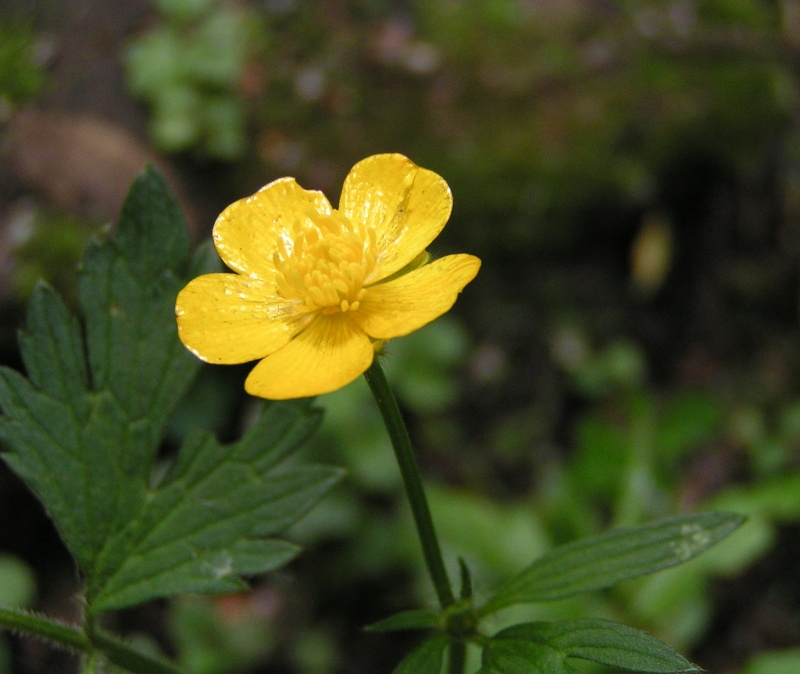
- Boglárka is a name derived from a type of medieval jewel, but it is also the name of a type of wild "buttercup" in Hungarian.
- Gender: female

Origin
- Origin: Hungarian
- Meaning: "buttercup" or "jewel"
- Region of origin: Hungary

Other names
- Nickname: Bogi
- Related names: Boglár

Boglárka is a popular Hungarian female name meaning either "jewel" or "buttercup." It was the second most popular name for girls born in Hungary in 2007.

== People ==
- Boglárka Csemer (born 1986), Hungarian singer
- Boglárka Dallos-Nyers (born 1997), Hungarian singer
- Boglárka Kapás (born 1993), Hungarian freestyle swimmer
- Boglárka Megyeri (born 1987), Hungarian football midfielder
- Boglárka Szabó (born 1993), Hungarian football midfielder
