= Csilla =

- Gender: feminine
- Language: Hungarian
- Name day: April 22

Origin
- Language: Hungarian
- Meaning: "star"

Other names
- Nicknames: Csillus, Csilli
- Anglicisation: Stella
- Related names: Csillag, Stella, Eszter

Csilla (Hungarian: [ˈt͡ʃillɒ]) is a Hungarian feminine given name that comes from the Hungarian word csillag, literally meaning star. Notable people with the name include:

- Csilla Balázs (born 1996), Hungarian–Romanian footballer
- Csilla Bátorfi (born 1969), Hungarian table tennis player
- Csilla von Boeselager (1941–1994), Hungarian Baroness
- Csilla Boross, Hungarian operatic soprano
- Csilla Borsányi (born 1987), Hungarian former tennis player
- Csilla Füri (born 1972), Hungarian modern pentathlete
- Csilla Hegedüs (born 1967), Romanian politician
- Csilla Madarász (1943–2021), Hungarian swimmer
- Csilla Molnár (1969–1986), Hungarian beauty queen
- Csilla Németh (born 1989), Hungarian handball player
- Csilla Tatár (born 1983), Hungarian reporter and presenter
