= Vilmos =

- Gender: Male
- Language: Hungarian
- Name day: 10 January

Origin
- Region of origin: Hungary

Vilmos (Hungarian pronunciation: [ˈvilmoʃ]) is a masculine given name, the Hungarian form of the Germanic Wilhelm gained through the Latin Vilhelmus.

== People named Vilmos ==
=== In sport ===
- Vilmos Szabó (1964–), Hungarian fencer
- Vilmos Orbán (1992–), Hungarian footballer
- Vilmos Vanczák (1983–), Hungarian footballer
- Vilmos Göttler (1951–), Hungarian equestrian
- Vilmos Sebők (1973–), Hungarian footballer
- Vilmos Tölgyesi (1931–1970), Hungarian runner
- Vilmos Galló (1996–), Hungarian ice hockey player
- Vilmos Földes (1984–), Hungarian pool player
- Vilmos Énekes (1915–1990), Hungarian boxer
- Vilmos Kohut (1906–1986), Hungarian footballer
- Vilmos Radasics (1983–), Hungarian BMX racer
- Vilmos Iváncsó (1939–1997), Hungarian volleyball player
- Vilmos Jakab (1952–2024), Hungarian boxer
- Vilmos Telinger (1950–2013), Hungarian footballer
- Vilmos Zombori (1906–1993), Hungarian footballer
- Vilmos Lóczi (1925–1991), Hungarian basketball player
- Vilmos Varjú (1937–1994), Hungarian shot putter

=== In art ===
- Vilmos Aba-Novák (1894–1941), Hungarian painter
- Vilmos Huszár (1884–1960), Hungarian painter

=== In politics ===
- Vilmos Patay (1953–), Hungarian politician
- Vilmos Böhm (1880–1949), Hungarian politician
- Vilmos Tkálecz (1894–1950), Slovenian politician
- Vilmos Hellebronth (1895–1971), Hungarian politician
- Vilmos Szabó (1952–), Hungarian politician

=== In music ===
- Vilmos Tátrai (1912–1999), Hungarian violinist
- Vilmos Gryllus (1951–), Hungarian musician

=== Other ===
- Vilmos Zsolnay (1828–1900), Hungarian entrepreneur
- Vilmos Fraknói (1843–1924), Hungarian historian
- Vilmos Freund (1846–1920), Hungarian architect
- Vilmos Gábor (1881–1962), father of Zsa Zsa Gabor
- Vilmos Apor (1892–1945), Hungarian bishop
- Vilmos Komlós (1893–1959), Hungarian actor
- Vilmos Tartsay (1901–1944), Hungarian commander
- Vilmos Zsigmond (1930–2016), Hungarian cinematographer
- Vilmos Totik (1954–), Hungarian mathematician
