= Dorka =

Dorka Дорка
- Village
- Location within Vologda Oblast Location within Russia
- Coordinates: 59°31′N 37°28′E
- Country: Russia
- Region: Vologda Oblast
- District: Cherepovetsky District
- Time zone: UTC+3:00

Dorka (Russian: Дорка) is a rural locality (a village) in Voskresenskoye Rural Settlement, Cherepovetsky District, Vologda Oblast, Russia. The population was 6 as of 2002.

== Geography ==
Dorka is located 67 km (42 mi) northwest of Cherepovets (the district's administrative centre) by road. Podkamennik is the nearest rural locality.
