= Magdolna =

Magdolna is a given name. Notable people with the name include:

- Magdolna Komka, née Csábi, retired Hungarian high jumper
- Magdolna Kovács, Hungarian orienteering competitor
- Magdolna Nyári-Kovács (1921–2005), Hungarian fencer
- Magdolna Patóh (born 1948), Hungarian swimmer
- Magdolna Purgly (1881–1959), the wife of Admiral Miklós Horthy
- Magdolna Rúzsa (born 1985), Hungarian singer, winner of the 2006 Megasztár

== Other ==
- Magdolna (film), a 1942 Hungarian drama film
