= Márk =

Márk is the Hungarian form of Mark (given name), though outside Mark the Evangelist the name is quite rare as a given name in Hungarian. Notable people with the name include:

- Márk Opavszky (born 2001), Hungarian canoeist
- Márk Rózsavölgyi (1787–1848), Hungarian composer and violinist
- Márk Mosonyi
