= Lőrinc =

Lőrinc (Hungarian pronunciation: [ˈløːrint͡s]) is a Hungarian given name. It is a cognate of English Laurence, a name derived from a form of the Latin Laurentius.

Lőrinc may refer to:

- Lőrinc Galgóczi (born 1911, date of death unknown), Hungarian field handball player, competed in the 1936 Summer Olympics
- Lőrinc Szabó (1900–1957), Hungarian poet and literary translator
- Lőrinc Wathay (died 1573), Hungarian nobleman and castellan of Csesznek
