= Fruzsina Schildkraut =

Hungarian footballer

Personal information
- Date of birth: 30 March 1998 (age 28)
- Place of birth: Hungary,
- Position: Goalkeeper

Team information
- Current team: Viktória

Youth career
- 2010–2015: Szegedi AK Boszorkányok
- 2014–2015: Győztese

Senior career*
Years	Team	Apps	(Gls)
2015–2016	Szegedi AK Boszorkányok	20	(0)
2016–2019	Szent Mihály	45	(0)
2019–2022	Diósgyőr	53	(0)
2022–	Viktória	7	(0)

International career^{‡}
2016–2017	Hungary U-19	6	(0)
2019–	Hungary	3	(0)
- * Club domestic league appearances and goals as of 3 April 2023 ‡ National team caps and goals as of 3 April 2023

Fruzsina Schildkraut (born 30 March 1998) is a Hungarian footballer who plays as a goalkeeper for Viktória and the Hungary women's national team.

== Career ==
Schildkraut is a member of the Hungary senior national team. She made her debut for the team on 17 September 2020 against Sweden, coming on as a substitute for Dóra Süle. The goalkeeper that started the match, Barbara Bíró, was sent off.

== Personal life ==
Her father, Krisztián Schildkraut, was a volleyball player at international level.
