= Réka =

- Gender: feminine
- Language: Hungarian
- Name day: November 10

Origin
- Language: Unknown

Other names
- Variant form: Arikan

Réka is a Hungarian female given name. In Hungarian, it is used for Kreka, the wife of Attila the Hun. Although it is very difficult to find a diminutive form, there are some which are commonly used, such as Rékuci, Rékci, Réki, Rékus, and Ré. Its Finnish cognate is Riikka.

== Name days ==
- February 6
- November 10

== Famous bearers of this name ==
- Réka Szilvay (born 1972), Finnish-Hungarian violinist
- Réka Albert (born 1972), Hungarian-American professor of Physics and Biology
- Réka Nagy (born 1986), Hungarian swimmer
