= Ildikó =

- Gender: female
- Language: Hungarian
- Name day: March 10

Origin
- Language: Germanic
- Meaning: "battle" or "warrior"

Other names
- Nickname: Ildi
- Related names: Hilda, Hildegard

Ildikó is a Hungarian feminine given name of Germanic origin; its original Germanic version is Ilda or Hilda. Its meaning is "battle" or "warrior" in ancient Germanic languages. Its medieval Latin version was Ildico, which the Hungarians adopted later as Ildikó.

== Notable persons with that name ==
- Ildico (fl. 5th century AD), Ostrogoth princess, who was accused of poisoning king Attila the Hun during their wedding night.
- Ildikó Bánsági (born 1947), Hungarian actress
- Ildikó Enyedi (born 1955), Hungarian filmmaker
- Ildikó Erdélyi (born 1955), Hungarian long jumper
- Ildikó Keresztes, Hungarian singer and actress, see Hungary in the Eurovision Song Contest 2013
- Ildikó Kishonti (1947–2009), Hungarian actress
- Ildikó Mádl (born 1969), Hungarian chess player
- Ildikó Pécsi (1940–2020), Hungarian actress
- Ildikó Raimondi (born 1962), Hungarian-Austrian operatic soprano
- Ildikó Schwarczenberger (1951–2015), Hungarian foil fencer
- Ildikó Tóth (born 1966), Hungarian actress
- Ildikó Újlaky-Rejtő (born 1937), Hungarian Olympic and world champion foil fencer
