= Dénes Lukács (colonel) =

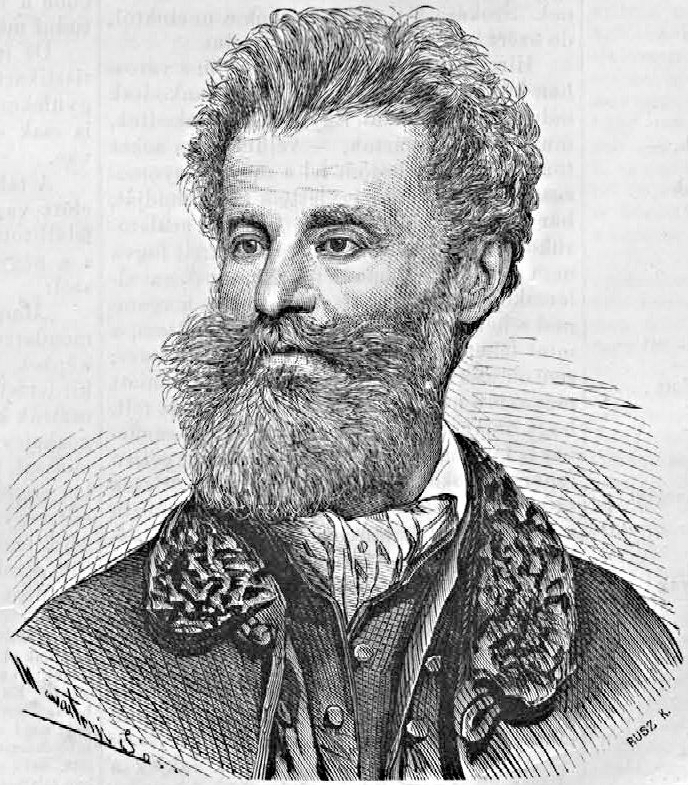
Dénes Lukács

Dénes Lukács (1816 in Oradea – 1 April 1868 in Nádudvar) was a lieutenant colonel in the Hungarian army and artillery commander.

As a young officer he taught the young Franz Joseph I of Austria artillery skills, but at the age of 32 he became was the main organiser of the Hungarian artillery during the Hungarian Revolution of 1848 and 1848/49 war of independence. Initially he was a lieutenant, but was promoted to the rank of lieutenant colonel in January 1849 in Debrecen. He was not himself involved in frontline combat but was the organizer of artillery production, training of artillerymen and city defenses. He was evacuated as the Austrians advanced, until the Hungarian surrender.

In 1850 he was sentenced to death, but the sentence was reduced to 16 years' imprisonment of which he eventually served 6. While in the prison at Komárom he became the maker of the first globe in Hungary. Following his release from prison in 1856, he in 1860 became superintendent of an orphanage in Nádudvar till his death.

He was of Armenian origin, his family being from Dumbrăveni.
