= Enikő =

- Gender: feminine
- Language: Hungarian
- Name day: September 15

Origin
- Language: Hungarian

Other names
- Nickname: Eni
- Related names: Enéh

Enikő is a Hungarian female given name, which was created by Hungarian poet Mihály Vörösmarty in the 19th century, and derived from the name Enéh, which means a "young hind" (female deer). In Hungarian mythology, Enéh or Eneth was the mother of Hunor and Magor, who were the fathers of the Hun and Hungarian nations, respectively. The name Enikő may refer to:

- Enikő Barabás (born 1986), Romanian rower
- Enikő Berkes (born 1975), Hungarian ice dancer
- Enikő Bollobás (born 1952), Hungarian literary scholar
- Enikő Eszenyi (born 1961), Hungarian actress
- Enikő Győri (born 1968), Hungarian politician
- Enikő Mihalik (born 1987), Hungarian model
- Enikő Muri (born 1990), Hungarian singer
- Enikő Somorjai (born 1981), Hungarian ballerina
- Enikő Szabó (born 1979), Hungarian athlete
