= Géza =

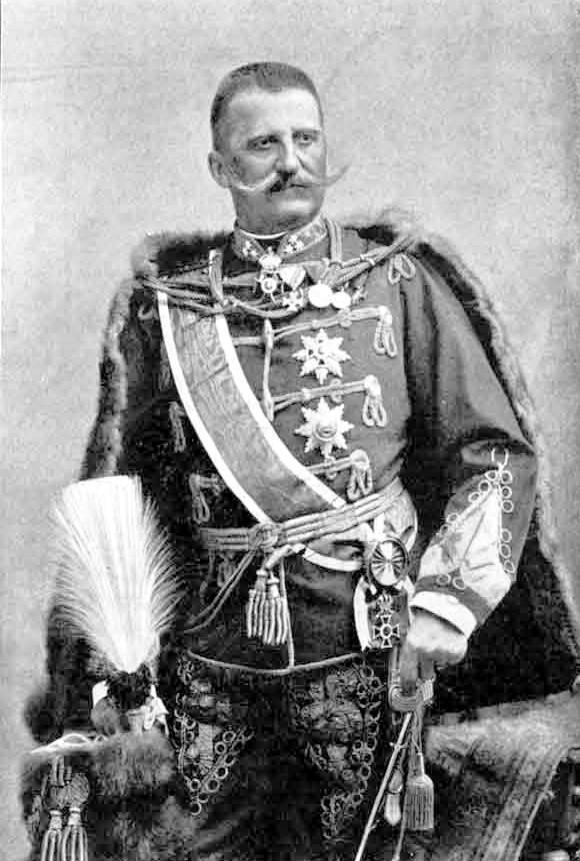
Fejérváry Géza Ellinger

Géza (Hungarian pronunciation: [ˈɡeːzɒ]) is a Hungarian given name. Its origin is not very clear, maybe from an old Turkish word meaning "prince".

It may refer to any of the following:

== As regnal or forename ==
- Géza, Grand Prince of the Hungarians
- Géza I of Hungary, King of Hungary
- Géza II of Hungary, King of Hungary
- Géza, son of Géza II of Hungary
- Géza Csáth (1887–1919), Hungarian writer, and psychiatrist
- Géza Dávid Turi (born 2001), Hungarian-Faroese football midfielder
- Geza de Kaplany (born 1926), Hungarian-American physician and murderer
- Géza Maróczy (1870–1951), Hungarian chess grandmaster
- Geza Šifliš (1907–1948), Yugoslav football goalkeeper
- Géza Steinhardt (1873–1944), Hungarian actor
- Géza Turi (born 1974), Hungarian football goalkeeper
- Géza Vermes (1924–2013), American scholar of religion
- Géza von Habsburg (born 1940), Austrian art historian and curator
- Geza von Hoffmann (1885–1921), Austrian-Hungarian writer and eugenicist
- Géza Wertheim (1910–1979), Luxembourgish athlete
- Geza X (born 1952), American music producer

== As middle name ==
- Benjamin Géza Affleck (born 1972), American actor and filmmaker
