= Katalin =

- Gender: feminine
- Language: Hungarian
- Name day: April 30, November 25

Origin
- Language: Greek
- Meaning: "pure"

Other names
- Variant forms: Katinka, Kata
- Nicknames: Kata, Kati, Katica
- Cognate: Catherine
- Anglicisation: Catherine

Katalin is a feminine given name and is a Hungarian variant from Catherine. Notable people with the name include:

- Katalin Bánffy Hungarian noblewoman
- Katalin Bársony (born 1982) Hungarian Romani film-maker and sociologist
- Kata Bethlen (1700–1759) Hungarian writer, sometimes known in English as Katherine Bethlen
- Katalin Bogyay (born 1956) President of the General Conference of UNESCO
- Katalin Cseh (born 1988) Canadian-born Hungarian physician and politician
- Katalin Csőke (1957–2017) Hungarian discus thrower
- Katalin Divós (born 1974) Hungarian female hammer thrower
- Katalin Eichler-Schadek (born 1940) Hungarian volleyball player
- Katalin Juhász (born 1932) Olympic gold medalist of Hungary
- Katalin Karády (1910-1990) as a Hungarian actress and singer
- Katalin Kariko (born 1955) Hungarian scientist who, with Drew Weissman, developed the technology behind the COVID-19 mRNA vaccines
- Katalin Kovács (born 1976) Olympic medalist of Hungary
- Katalin Laki (born 1948) Hungarian handball player
- Katalin Lévai (born 1954) Hungarian politician and Member of the European Parliament
- Katalin Makray (born 1945) Hungarian former gymnast
- Katalin Marosi (born 1979) Hungarian professional tennis player
- Katalin Nagy (born 1979) Hungarian ultramarathon runner
- Katalin Novák (born 1977) Hungarian politician, President of Hungary
- Katalin Pálinger (born 1978) former Hungarian international team handball goalkeeper
- Katalin Szabó (born 1967) Romanian artistic gymnast
- Katalin Szili (born 1956) Speakers of the National Assembly of Hungary
- Katalin Szőke (1935–2017) is a Hungarian swimmer and Olympic champion
- Katalin Vad (born 1980) Hungarian female pornographic film actress
- Katalin zu Windisch-Graetz (born 1947) Hungarian aristocrat and designer
- Catherine of Hungary, Queen of Serbia (1256–1314) daughter of Stephen V of Hungary
- Catherine of Hungary, Duchess of Świdnica (1338–1343 or 1345-1355) daughter of Charles I of Hungary
- Catherine of Hungary (1370–1378) (1370–1378) daughter of King Louis the Great
