= Dénes Mihály =

Hungarian engineer

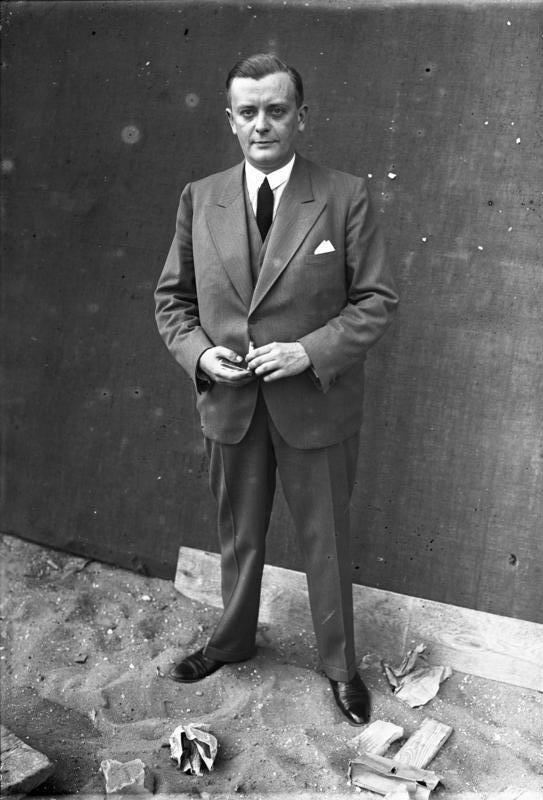
Mihály in 1930

Dénes Mihály (7 July 1894, Gödöllő – 29 August 1953, West-Berlin) was a Hungarian inventor, engineer.

Mihály graduated as a mechanical engineer at the Technical University in Budapest. During his high school studies – at the age of 16 – he published books on automobiles and motorcycles. After university he began experimenting with television technology at the Telephone factory. His first conception of a television construction in 1919 was called the "Telehor", which was capable of transmitting still pictures over a distance of many kilometers. From 1924 he continued his experiments at the Allgemeine Elektrizitäts-Gesellschaft in Berlin with still pictures, later transferring the results to motion pictures. He established a company called "TELEHOR AG" to manufacture television sets.

In 1935 the Mihály–Traub television set appeared on the market, which he jointly developed with the physicist E. H. Traub. One of Dénes Mihály's most significant inventions was the "Projectophon", patented in 1922, which received recognition in the field of sound picture. During the course of his life he created many more important inventions in the field of television.
