= Istvan (disambiguation) =

István is a Hungarian masculine given name, equivalent to Stephen or Stefan.

István may also refer to:

- Miloslav Ištvan (1928–1990), Czech composer
- Norbert István (born 1996), Romanian footballer
- Zoltan Istvan Gyurko (born 1973), American transhumanist, journalist, entrepreneur, political candidate and futurist
- István, a király, rock opera
- István Cave, a cave in Hungary

== See also ==
- SMS Szent István, battleship named after Saint Stephen
