= Tivadar (given name) =

- Gender: male
- Language: Hungarian
- Name day: 20 April

Origin
- Language: Latin
- Origin: Theodorus
- Meaning: "God-given"

Other names
- Variant form: Tódor
- Derived: From the Greek words θεός, (theós) "God" and δώρον (dōron) "gift"
- Related names: Theodore

Tivadar is a Hungarian masculine given name. It is a cognate of the English language Theodore.

== Notable people named Tivadar ==
- Tivadar Alconiere (1797–1865), Austro-Hungarian painter
- Tivadar Andrássy (1857–1905), Hungarian politician, painter, and art collector
- Tivadar Batthyány (1859–1931), Hungarian politician
- Tivadar Csontváry Kosztka (1853–1919), Hungarian painter
- Tivadar Farkasházy (born 1945), Hungarian humorist, author, and journalist
- Tivadar Filótás (1903–1945), Hungarian modern pentathlete
- Tivadar Kanizsa (1933–1975), Hungarian water polo player
- Tivadar Kardos (1921–1998), Hungarian chess composer and an author
- Tivadar Millner (1899–1988), Hungarian chemical engineer, inventor, and educator
- Tivadar Monostori (1936–2014), Hungarian footballer
- Tivadar Nachéz (1859–1930), Hungarian violinist and composer
- Tivadar Pauler (1816–1886), Hungarian politician and educator
- Tivadar Puskás (1844–1893), Hungarian inventor, electrical engineer, and telephone pioneer
- Tivadar Puskás (born 1952), Hungarian physician
- Tivadar Soros (1893–1968), Hungarian lawyer, author, editor, and father of George and Paul Soros
- Tivadar Tulassay (born 1949) Hungarian pediatrician, nephrologist, and educator
- Tivadar Uray (1895–1962), Hungarian actor
- Tivadar Zemplényi (1864–1917), Hungarian painter
