= Zsófia =

- Pronunciation: [ˈʒoːfiɒ]
- Gender: feminine
- Language: Hungarian
- Name day: May 15, September 17

Origin
- Language: Greek
- Meaning: wisdom

Other names
- Variant form: Szófia
- Nicknames: Zsófi, Zsófika
- Cognate: Sophia
- Anglicisations: Sophia, Sophie

Zsófia is a female given name, the Hungarian equivalent of Sophia, and may refer to:

- Zsofia Balazs (born 1990), Canadian distance swimmer
- Zsófia Balla (born 1949), Romanian-born Hungarian poet and essayist
- Zsófia Bán (born 1957), writer, literary historian, essayist and art and literature critic
- Zsófia Báthory (1629–1680), Hungarian noblewomen, mother of Francis I Rákóczi
- Zsófia Bosnyák (1609–1644), Hungarian noblewomen, wife of Count Ferenc Wesselényi
- Zsófia Csonka (born 1983), Hungarian sport-shooter
- Zsófia Csorba (born 2003), Hungarian canoeist
- Zsófia Dénes (1885–1987), Hungarian writer
- Zsófia Erdélyi (born 1987), Hungarian long-distance runner
- Zsófia Fegyverneky (born 1984), Hungarian basketball player
- Zsófia Földházi (born 1993), Hungarian modern pentathlon
- Zsófia Gottschall (born 1978), Hungarian biathlete
- Zsófia Gubacsi (born 1981), Hungarian former professional tennis player
- Zsófia von Habsburg (born 2001), Hungarian member of the House of Habsburg-Lorraine
- Zsófia Illésházy (1547–1599), Hungarian noblewoman
- Zsófia Kovács (born 1988), Hungarian professional triathlete
- Zsófia Kovács (born 2000), Hungarian artistic gymnast
- Zsófia Méray Horváth (1889–1977), Hungarian figure skater
- Zsófia Polgár (born 1974), Hungarian and Israeli chess player, teacher, and artist
- Zsófia Rácz (born 1988), Hungarian football player
- Zsófia Szamosi (born 1977), Hungarian actress
- Zsófia Torma (1840–1899), Hungarian archaeologist, anthropologist and paleontologist
- Zsófia Tóth (born 1989), Hungarian professional triathlete
- Sophia of Hungary, Duchess of Saxony (1050–1095), daughter of Béla I of Hungary
- Sophia (Coloman of Hungary's daughter) (1097–1100) the eldest known child of King Coloman of Hungary
- Sophia of Hungary (nun) (1136–1161) daughter of Béla II of Hungary
