= Jenő =

Jenő (Hungarian pronunciation: [ˈjɛnøː]) is a Hungarian male given name. In Austria and Germany the name is often simplified to Jenö (which in Hungarian is a shorter vowel) and pronounced as German umlaut ö. Jenő is also the legendary founder of one of Hungary's original tribes, and the name of that tribe.

Since the 19th century it became a variant of Eugene. Notable people with the name include:

== Hungarian form, Jenő ==
- Jenő, one of the seven princes after which were named the seven Magyar tribes
- Jenő, Eugene of Savoy, Austrian rescuer of Hungary and national hero
- Jenő Ábrahám (1903–1973), Hungarian and Yugoslav international football player
- Jenő Barcsay (1900–1988), Hungarian painter
- Jenő Bódi (born 1963), Hungarian wrestler
- Jenő Bory (1879–1959), Hungarian architect and sculptor
- Jenő Brandi (1913–1980), Hungarian water polo player
- Jenő Buzánszky (1925–2015), Hungarian footballer
- Jenő Csaknády (1924–2001), Hungarian footballer and writer
- Jenő Csepreghy (1912–1978), Hungarian film director
- Jenő Dalnoki (1932–2006), Hungarian footballer
- Jenő Danis (1886–1963), Hungarian actor
- Jenő Dulovits (1903–1972), Hungarian cinematographer
- Jenő Elefánt (1897/99–1944/45), Transylvanian Hungarian painter
- Jenő Fitz (1921–2011), Hungarian archaeologist and numismatist
- Jenő Fock (1916–2001), Hungarian communist politician
- Jenő Fuchs (1882–1955), Hungarian Olympic champion fencer
- Jenő Gaál (1906–1980), Hungarian composer
- Jenő Gergely (1944–2009), Hungarian historian
- Jenő Gerő (Gerő Jenő), birth name of S. Z. Sakall (1883–1955), Hungarian actor
- Jenő Hámori (economist), Hungarian economist
- Jenő Hámori (fencer) (1933–2025), Hungarian fencer
- Jenő Hubay (1858–1937), Hungarian violinist und composer
- Jenő Huszka (1875–1960), Hungarian composer
- Jenő Jandó (1952–2023), Hungarian pianist
- Jenő Janovics (1872–1945), Hungarian film pioneer
- Jenő Kalmár (1908–1990), Hungarian footballer and trainer
- Jenő Károly (1886–1926), Hungarian footballer and trainer
- Jenő Konrád (1894–1978), Hungarian footballer and trainer
- Jenő Krúdy (1860–1942), Hungarian doctor and amateur astronomer
- Jenő László (1878–1919), Hungarian revolutionary, lawyer and politician
- Jenő Medveczky (1902–1969), Hungarian painter
- Jenő Pataky (1914–1996), Hungarian actor
- Jenő Pozsony (1885–1936), Hungarian Transylvanian painter
- Jenő Rejtő (1905–1943), Hungarian writer
- Jenő Takács (1902–2005), Hungarian-Austrian composer and pianist
- Jenő Vécsey (1909–1966), Hungarian composer
- Jenő Vincze (1908–1988), Hungarian footballer and trainer

== German form, Jenö ==
- Jenö Bango (born 1934), German sociologist
- Jenö von Egan-Krieger (1886–1965), German officer and politician (DNVP)
- Jenö Eisenberger (1922–2016), German-Austrian art collector and businessman
- Jenö Marton (1905–1958), Hungarian-Swiss writer

== See also ==
- Jenő (village), in Fejér county
