= List of members of the National Assembly of Hungary (1945–1947) =

National Assembly of Hungary (1945–1947)

Type
- Type: unicameral
- Houses: National Assembly

History
- Founded: 29 November 1945
- Disbanded: 16 September 1947 (1 year, 291 days)
- Preceded by: Provisional National Assembly
- Succeeded by: Members 1947–1949

Leadership
- Speaker of the National Assembly: Ferenc Nagy, FKGP 29 November 1945 – 5 February 1946 Béla Varga, FKGP 5 February 1946 – 3 July 1947 Árpád Szabó, FKGP since 4 July 1947

Structure
- Seats: 421 (409+12)
- Political groups: At opening: Government (407): FKGP (245); MKP (70); MSZDP (69); NPP (23); Opposition (14): PDP (2); Ind. (12)

Elections
- Last election: 4 November 1945
- Next election: 31 August 1947

Meeting place
- Hungarian Parliament Building, Budapest

This is a list of members of the unicameral National Assembly of Hungary according to the results of the elections of 1945. This was the first legislature in Hungary's history to be freely and fairly elected by full and universal suffrage, while an additional twelve public dignitaries were rewarded honorary mandates in the new parliament. It would be the last such parliament until 1990.

== Composition ==
=== At the opening of Parliament ===
Party	MPs	Of total
Independent Smallholders' Party	245	58.19%
Hungarian Communist Party	70	16.63%
Hungarian Social Democratic Party	69	16.39%
National Peasant Party	23	5.46%
Civic Democratic Party	2	0.48%
Independents	12	2.85%
Total	421	100%

=== At the closing of Parliament ===
Party	MPs	Of total
Independent Smallholders' Party	187	44.52%
Hungarian Communist Party	70	16.67%
Hungarian Social Democratic Party	69	16.42%
National Peasant Party	21	5.00%
Hungarian Freedom Party	21	5.00%
Civic Democratic Party	1	0.24%
Independents	49	11.67%
Total	420	100%

== Government ==
No.	Portrait	Name (Birth–Death)	Term of office		Political party	Cabinet
39		Zoltán Tildy (1889–1961)	15 November 1945	1 February 1946	FKGP	Tildy; FKGP–MKP–MSZDP–NPP
—		Mátyás Rákosi (1892–1971) acting	1 February 1946	4 February 1946	MKP	Tildy; FKGP–MKP–MSZDP–NPP
40		Ferenc Nagy (1903–1979)	4 February 1946	31 May 1947 (Note: Nagy did not recognize the appointment of Dinnyés as Prime Minister and resigned only on 2 June 1947)(deposed)	FKGP	F. Nagy; FKGP–MKP–MSZDP–NPP
—		Mátyás Rákosi (1892–1971) acting	31 May 1947 (Note: Took over direction of the Council of Ministers on 14 May 1947 upon Nagy's departure to Switzerland. Became sole Acting Prime Minister upon Nagy's deposition.)		MKP	F. Nagy; FKGP–MKP–MSZDP–NPP
41		Lajos Dinnyés (1901–1961)	31 May 1947	10 December 1948	FKGP	Dinnyés (MKP–MSZDP)→MDP (Note: The Hungarian Communist Party and Social Democratic Party of Hungary merged to form the Hungarian Working People's Party on 12 June 1948)–FKGP–NPP

== List of members ==
Members and their parties upon the opening of Parliament, 29 November 1945.

Independent Smallholders' Party
Hungarian Communist Party
National Peasant Party
Social Democratic Party
Civic Democratic Party
Independents

County	Seats	Members
Baranya and Tolna	22	Jenő Dulin
Baranya and Tolna	22	Viktor Perr
Baranya and Tolna	22	János Taksonyi
Baranya and Tolna	22	Pál Rőth
Baranya and Tolna	22	János Borbély
Baranya and Tolna	22	Antal Lábady
Baranya and Tolna	22	Nándor Koszér
Baranya and Tolna	22	Béla Szécsey
Baranya and Tolna	22	Béla Padányi Gulyás
Baranya and Tolna	22	Jenő Czövek
Baranya and Tolna	22	Vendel Barkóczy
Baranya and Tolna	22	János Babody
Baranya and Tolna	22	Sándor Dömötör
Baranya and Tolna	22	László Samu
Baranya and Tolna	22	Lajos Matzkó
Baranya and Tolna	22	Mihály Farkas
Baranya and Tolna	22	Pál Krancz
Baranya and Tolna	22	Gyula Hajdu
Baranya and Tolna	22	József Czéh
Baranya and Tolna	22	József Tolnai
Baranya and Tolna	22	Péter Bechtler
Baranya and Tolna	22	Gyula Pozsgay
Somogy	15	József Kovács
Somogy	15	Olivér Gaál
Somogy	15	József Jónás
Somogy	15	János Gabriél
Somogy	15	Mihály Hompola
Somogy	15	János Molics
Somogy	15	József Németh
Somogy	15	Tibor Fekete
Somogy	15	Gyula Papszt
Somogy	15	Ödön Antl
Somogy	15	Ferenc Kiss
Somogy	15	József Zákányi
Somogy	15	István Sinkovics
Somogy	15	Ferenc Erdei
Somogy	15	Anna Kéthly
Zala	14	Ferenc Kovács
Zala	14	Győzo Drózdy
Zala	14	Ferenc Bekéfi
Zala	14	Imre Bencze
Zala	14	Lajos Németh
Zala	14	Károly Mangliár
Zala	14	László Cifra
Zala	14	János Magyar
Zala	14	Ernő Megyesy
Zala	14	Lajos Ledniczky
Zala	14	László Fillér
Zala	14	Károly Bedő
Zala	14	Mátyás Rákosi
Zala	14	János Dombáy
Vas	10	Sándor Mándli
Vas	10	Tibor Hám
Vas	10	János Janzsó
Vas	10	Imre Pászthory
Vas	10	Gyula Belső
Vas	10	János Czeiczel
Vas	10	Jenő Katona
Vas	10	Kálmán Erőss
Vas	10	Imre Szabó
Vas	10	György Marosán
Győr-Moson-Sopron	15	György Parragi
Győr-Moson-Sopron	15	Lajos Hajdu Németh
Győr-Moson-Sopron	15	Ernő Meixner
Győr-Moson-Sopron	15	András Szalay
Győr-Moson-Sopron	15	Pál Jaczkó
Győr-Moson-Sopron	15	György Horváth
Győr-Moson-Sopron	15	Géza Komlós
Győr-Moson-Sopron	15	Bálint Czupy
Győr-Moson-Sopron	15	József Pécsi
Győr-Moson-Sopron	15	István Kossa
Győr-Moson-Sopron	15	Zoltán Szantó
Győr-Moson-Sopron	15	Imre Szomogyi
Győr-Moson-Sopron	15	Géza Malasits
Győr-Moson-Sopron	15	Vilmos Zentai
Győr-Moson-Sopron	15	István Udvaros
Vesprém	9	Dezső Sulyok
Vesprém	9	Lajos Kocsi
Vesprém	9	Ferenc Vidovics
Vesprém	9	Jenő Ruip
Vesprém	9	György Farkas
Vesprém	9	József Antall, Sr.
Vesprém	9	Pál Kocsi
Vesprém	9	István Horváth
Vesprém	9	Károly Peyer
Fejér-Komárom-Esztergom	18	István Dobi
Fejér-Komárom-Esztergom	18	István Kovács
Fejér-Komárom-Esztergom	18	László Cseh-Szombathy
Fejér-Komárom-Esztergom	18	István Tőke
Fejér-Komárom-Esztergom	18	Ferenc Vócsa
Fejér-Komárom-Esztergom	18	József Gróh
Fejér-Komárom-Esztergom	18	József Dancs
Fejér-Komárom-Esztergom	18	Ignác Nagy
Fejér-Komárom-Esztergom	18	Sándor Nyirjessy
Fejér-Komárom-Esztergom	18	Kálmán Szabó
Fejér-Komárom-Esztergom	18	László Rajk
Fejér-Komárom-Esztergom	18	György Osztrovszki
Fejér-Komárom-Esztergom	18	János Zgyerka
Fejér-Komárom-Esztergom	18	Lajos Jócsik
Fejér-Komárom-Esztergom	18	Árpád Szakasits
Fejér-Komárom-Esztergom	18	Miklós Vas
Fejér-Komárom-Esztergom	18	Dénes Czézner
Fejér-Komárom-Esztergom	18	János Borbély
Budapest	68	Zoltán Tildy
Budapest	68	Imre Oltványi
Budapest	68	Albert Bereczky
Budapest	68	Viktor Csornoky
Budapest	68	Jószef Kővágó
Budapest	68	József Bognár
Budapest	68	Pál Auer
Budapest	68	György Gulácsy
Budapest	68	Erzsébet Gyenis
Budapest	68	László Jékelyi
Budapest	68	Gyula Dessewffy
Budapest	68	Zoltán Pfeiffer
Budapest	68	Tamás Pásztor
Budapest	68	Ilma Oberschall
Budapest	68	László Pesta
Budapest	68	László Felvinczi
Budapest	68	Anna Veress
Budapest	68	László Gyulai
Budapest	68	Sándor Eckhardt
Budapest	68	Kálmán Saláta
Budapest	68	Gyula Jármay
Budapest	68	János Horváth
Budapest	68	Dezső Futó
Budapest	68	Pál Tessik
Budapest	68	István Csurgai
Budapest	68	Ferenc Palinay
Budapest	68	József Szenner
Budapest	68	István Szolnoki
Budapest	68	Ferenc Gordon
Budapest	68	György Esterhás
Budapest	68	Ignác Sári
Budapest	68	Béla Halter
Budapest	68	József Szemes
Budapest	68	Zoltán Vas
Budapest	68	Ernő Gerő
Budapest	68	Károly Kiss
Budapest	68	Piroska Szabó
Budapest	68	István Kovács
Budapest	68	Lajos Drahos
Budapest	68	Anna Ratkó
Budapest	68	Antal Apró
Budapest	68	István Rusznyák
Budapest	68	József Prieszol
Budapest	68	Aranka Némety
Budapest	68	István Varga
Budapest	68	Jenő Gyósci
Budapest	68	József Sipka
Budapest	68	Imre Kovács
Budapest	68	István Ries
Budapest	68	István Száva
Budapest	68	Gyula Kelemen
Budapest	68	Mihály Révész
Budapest	68	Lajos Szamay
Budapest	68	János Dávid
Budapest	68	Alfréd Halász
Budapest	68	László Faragó
Budapest	68	Jolán Koronya
Budapest	68	István Ivanics
Budapest	68	Tibor Vágvölgyi
Budapest	68	Imre Jancsecz
Budapest	68	Béla Lányi
Budapest	68	Lajos Gallai
Budapest	68	Antal Kárpáti
Budapest	68	Károly Gyurkovits
Budapest	68	János Popik
Budapest	68	Sándor Visnyei
Budapest	68	Sándor Szent-Iványi
Budapest	68	Margit Slachta
Pest-Pilis-Solt-Kiskun and Bács-Bodrog	48	Ferenc Nagy
Pest-Pilis-Solt-Kiskun and Bács-Bodrog	48	Lajos Dinnyés
Pest-Pilis-Solt-Kiskun and Bács-Bodrog	48	László Révész
Pest-Pilis-Solt-Kiskun and Bács-Bodrog	48	Gyula Bencsik
Pest-Pilis-Solt-Kiskun and Bács-Bodrog	48	József Bácsalmási
Pest-Pilis-Solt-Kiskun and Bács-Bodrog	48	Aladár Pongrácz
Pest-Pilis-Solt-Kiskun and Bács-Bodrog	48	Elek Patonay
Pest-Pilis-Solt-Kiskun and Bács-Bodrog	48	Imre Almási
Pest-Pilis-Solt-Kiskun and Bács-Bodrog	48	István Csala
Pest-Pilis-Solt-Kiskun and Bács-Bodrog	48	Jenő Némethy
Pest-Pilis-Solt-Kiskun and Bács-Bodrog	48	Ferenc Kiss
Pest-Pilis-Solt-Kiskun and Bács-Bodrog	48	László Kiss
Pest-Pilis-Solt-Kiskun and Bács-Bodrog	48	Gedeon Vargha
Pest-Pilis-Solt-Kiskun and Bács-Bodrog	48	András Palásti
Pest-Pilis-Solt-Kiskun and Bács-Bodrog	48	Imre Veér
Pest-Pilis-Solt-Kiskun and Bács-Bodrog	48	Tibor Pongrácz
Pest-Pilis-Solt-Kiskun and Bács-Bodrog	48	István Kiss
Pest-Pilis-Solt-Kiskun and Bács-Bodrog	48	Alfréd Ofner
Pest-Pilis-Solt-Kiskun and Bács-Bodrog	48	József Szenthe
Pest-Pilis-Solt-Kiskun and Bács-Bodrog	48	József Sisitka
Pest-Pilis-Solt-Kiskun and Bács-Bodrog	48	György Hódy
Pest-Pilis-Solt-Kiskun and Bács-Bodrog	48	Antal Kovács
Pest-Pilis-Solt-Kiskun and Bács-Bodrog	48	Dömötör Balla
Pest-Pilis-Solt-Kiskun and Bács-Bodrog	48	Sándor Vass
Pest-Pilis-Solt-Kiskun and Bács-Bodrog	48	István Blaskó
Pest-Pilis-Solt-Kiskun and Bács-Bodrog	48	Imre G. Fülöp
Pest-Pilis-Solt-Kiskun and Bács-Bodrog	48	Antal Balla
Pest-Pilis-Solt-Kiskun and Bács-Bodrog	48	János Rózsahegyi
Pest-Pilis-Solt-Kiskun and Bács-Bodrog	48	Bódog Nagy
Pest-Pilis-Solt-Kiskun and Bács-Bodrog	48	Endre Reicher
Pest-Pilis-Solt-Kiskun and Bács-Bodrog	48	Mihály Haluska
Pest-Pilis-Solt-Kiskun and Bács-Bodrog	48	Erik Molnár
Pest-Pilis-Solt-Kiskun and Bács-Bodrog	48	Ferenc Donáth
Pest-Pilis-Solt-Kiskun and Bács-Bodrog	48	József Gábor
Pest-Pilis-Solt-Kiskun and Bács-Bodrog	48	József Macskasi
Pest-Pilis-Solt-Kiskun and Bács-Bodrog	48	Márton Horváth
Pest-Pilis-Solt-Kiskun and Bács-Bodrog	48	János Török
Pest-Pilis-Solt-Kiskun and Bács-Bodrog	48	Géza Losonczy
Pest-Pilis-Solt-Kiskun and Bács-Bodrog	48	Pál S. Szabó
Pest-Pilis-Solt-Kiskun and Bács-Bodrog	48	János Adorján
Pest-Pilis-Solt-Kiskun and Bács-Bodrog	48	János Válóci
Pest-Pilis-Solt-Kiskun and Bács-Bodrog	48	Imre Szélig
Pest-Pilis-Solt-Kiskun and Bács-Bodrog	48	Ödön Kisházi
Pest-Pilis-Solt-Kiskun and Bács-Bodrog	48	István Turi
Pest-Pilis-Solt-Kiskun and Bács-Bodrog	48	Lászó Tóth
Pest-Pilis-Solt-Kiskun and Bács-Bodrog	48	István Bundzsák
Pest-Pilis-Solt-Kiskun and Bács-Bodrog	48	Fanni Auer
Pest-Pilis-Solt-Kiskun and Bács-Bodrog	48	László Csala
Csongrád and Csanád	22	István Balogh
Csongrád and Csanád	22	János Márk Nagyiván
Csongrád and Csanád	22	János S. Saghy
Csongrád and Csanád	22	János Mihály
Csongrád and Csanád	22	Ferenc Tárkány Szücs
Csongrád and Csanád	22	Imre Szőnyi
Csongrád and Csanád	22	Bálint Józsai
Csongrád and Csanád	22	Gyula Dobó
Csongrád and Csanád	22	Tamás Keresztes
Csongrád and Csanád	22	István Dénes
Csongrád and Csanád	22	Ferenc Implom
Csongrád and Csanád	22	Sándor Bálint
Csongrád and Csanád	22	József Révai
Csongrád and Csanád	22	Imre Kiss
Csongrád and Csanád	22	Imre Dadi
Csongrád and Csanád	22	Imre Tombácz
Csongrád and Csanád	22	Mihály Oláh
Csongrád and Csanád	22	János Pap
Csongrád and Csanád	22	Ferenc Takács
Csongrád and Csanád	22	Ágoston Valentiny
Csongrád and Csanád	22	István Erdei
Csongrád and Csanád	22	Ernő Kiss
Békés	14	István B. Szabó
Békés	14	Árpád Szabó
Békés	14	Lajos Rácz
Békés	14	József Futó
Békés	14	Antal Ravasz
Békés	14	János Gálik
Békés	14	János Gyuska
Békés	14	István Szirmai
Békés	14	Imre Birkás
Békés	14	András Vári
Békés	14	János Hegyesi
Békés	14	Ferenc Szeder
Békés	14	Erzsébet Müller
Békés	14	Péter Kurunczi
Jász-Nagykun-Szolnok	16	János Gyöngyösi
Jász-Nagykun-Szolnok	16	Mihály Guba
Jász-Nagykun-Szolnok	16	Ferenc Z. Nagy
Jász-Nagykun-Szolnok	16	Kornél Milassin
Jász-Nagykun-Szolnok	16	Béla Mizsei
Jász-Nagykun-Szolnok	16	Mihály Kerék
Jász-Nagykun-Szolnok	16	Sándor Csíkos
Jász-Nagykun-Szolnok	16	Dezső Udvary
Jász-Nagykun-Szolnok	16	Ferenc Gaál
Jász-Nagykun-Szolnok	16	Antal Ragó
Jász-Nagykun-Szolnok	16	Antal Gyenes
Jász-Nagykun-Szolnok	16	Kálmán Bakó
Jász-Nagykun-Szolnok	16	Győző Vidor
Jász-Nagykun-Szolnok	16	László Nánási
Jász-Nagykun-Szolnok	16	József Takács
Jász-Nagykun-Szolnok	16	József Kiss
Hajdú-Bihar	19	István Vásáry
Hajdú-Bihar	19	Lajos Bihari Nagy
Hajdú-Bihar	19	Ferenc Kálmán
Hajdú-Bihar	19	Lászó Csősz
Hajdú-Bihar	19	Lajos Csizmadia
Hajdú-Bihar	19	Miklós Zsom
Hajdú-Bihar	19	Zoltán Lévay
Hajdú-Bihar	19	Gyula Szigethy
Hajdú-Bihar	19	Kálmán Hajdu
Hajdú-Bihar	19	Lajos N. Gál
Hajdú-Bihar	19	Gyula Kállai
Hajdú-Bihar	19	István Szabó
Hajdú-Bihar	19	Sándor Zöld
Hajdú-Bihar	19	Pál Szabó
Hajdú-Bihar	19	Imre Kondor
Hajdú-Bihar	19	Ferenc Gém
Hajdú-Bihar	19	István Szabó
Hajdú-Bihar	19	János Kovács
Hajdú-Bihar	19	Sándor Kállai
Szabolcs-Szatmár-Bereg	21	Mária Bende
Szabolcs-Szatmár-Bereg	21	János Erőss
Szabolcs-Szatmár-Bereg	21	István Szabó
Szabolcs-Szatmár-Bereg	21	Mihály Tomasosvszky
Szabolcs-Szatmár-Bereg	21	József Virág
Szabolcs-Szatmár-Bereg	21	Sándor Kiss
Szabolcs-Szatmár-Bereg	21	Dániel Andrássy
Szabolcs-Szatmár-Bereg	21	Menyhért Veress
Szabolcs-Szatmár-Bereg	21	István Ternay
Szabolcs-Szatmár-Bereg	21	József Gyulai
Szabolcs-Szatmár-Bereg	21	György Papp
Szabolcs-Szatmár-Bereg	21	Sándor Csoma
Szabolcs-Szatmár-Bereg	21	Sándor Lengyel
Szabolcs-Szatmár-Bereg	21	József Mócsán
Szabolcs-Szatmár-Bereg	21	Imre Nagy
Szabolcs-Szatmár-Bereg	21	András Pintér
Szabolcs-Szatmár-Bereg	21	László Bartha
Szabolcs-Szatmár-Bereg	21	János Tóth
Szabolcs-Szatmár-Bereg	21	István Mikita
Szabolcs-Szatmár-Bereg	21	Roland Kiss
Szabolcs-Szatmár-Bereg	21	József Pásztor
Borsod-Gömör-Zemplén-Abaúj	25	József Vásáry
Borsod-Gömör-Zemplén-Abaúj	25	Gábor Rácz
Borsod-Gömör-Zemplén-Abaúj	25	Tivadar Pártay
Borsod-Gömör-Zemplén-Abaúj	25	László Acsay
Borsod-Gömör-Zemplén-Abaúj	25	Endre Cziáky
Borsod-Gömör-Zemplén-Abaúj	25	József G. Tóth
Borsod-Gömör-Zemplén-Abaúj	25	István Dubay
Borsod-Gömör-Zemplén-Abaúj	25	Ferenc Augusztin
Borsod-Gömör-Zemplén-Abaúj	25	János Szabó Pap
Borsod-Gömör-Zemplén-Abaúj	25	József Szabó
Borsod-Gömör-Zemplén-Abaúj	25	József Szakács
Borsod-Gömör-Zemplén-Abaúj	25	László Pocsai
Borsod-Gömör-Zemplén-Abaúj	25	Sándor Illés
Borsod-Gömör-Zemplén-Abaúj	25	István Brunszvik
Borsod-Gömör-Zemplén-Abaúj	25	János Bodnár
Borsod-Gömör-Zemplén-Abaúj	25	Sándor Nógrádi
Borsod-Gömör-Zemplén-Abaúj	25	Mihály Fekete
Borsod-Gömör-Zemplén-Abaúj	25	Gyula Leniczky
Borsod-Gömör-Zemplén-Abaúj	25	Mihály Urbancsek
Borsod-Gömör-Zemplén-Abaúj	25	József Fülöp
Borsod-Gömör-Zemplén-Abaúj	25	József Darvas
Borsod-Gömör-Zemplén-Abaúj	25	Sándor Rónai
Borsod-Gömör-Zemplén-Abaúj	25	Ferenc Reisinger
Borsod-Gömör-Zemplén-Abaúj	25	Júlia Nemes
Borsod-Gömör-Zemplén-Abaúj	25	István Juhász
Heves-Nógrád-Hont	23	Géza Mátéffy
Heves-Nógrád-Hont	23	József Adorján
Heves-Nógrád-Hont	23	Ender Baráth
Heves-Nógrád-Hont	23	István Szántó Vezekényi
Heves-Nógrád-Hont	23	János Piatrik
Heves-Nógrád-Hont	23	Jószef Csépány
Heves-Nógrád-Hont	23	Károly Vértesy
Heves-Nógrád-Hont	23	László Nagy
Heves-Nógrád-Hont	23	Ferenc Szabó
Heves-Nógrád-Hont	23	István Miskolczy
Heves-Nógrád-Hont	23	Lajos Nagy
Heves-Nógrád-Hont	23	János Nagy
Heves-Nógrád-Hont	23	László Kováts
Heves-Nógrád-Hont	23	János Kádár
Heves-Nógrád-Hont	23	János Oczel
Heves-Nógrád-Hont	23	György Sulyán
Heves-Nógrád-Hont	23	Ferenc Hermann
Heves-Nógrád-Hont	23	Ferenc Dömötör
Heves-Nógrád-Hont	23	Péter Veres
Heves-Nógrád-Hont	23	Márton Buzás
Heves-Nógrád-Hont	23	Antal Bán
Heves-Nógrád-Hont	23	István Szurdi
Heves-Nógrád-Hont	23	Károly Spitálszky
National list	50	Béla Varga
National list	50	Béla Kovács
National list	50	Lajos Szentiványi
National list	50	Samu Filó
National list	50	Zoltán Tildy Jr.
National list	50	Gergely Kiss
National list	50	Vince Nagy
National list	50	Vince Vörös
National list	50	Gyula Ortutay
National list	50	Mihály Vaskó
National list	50	Jenő Tombor
National list	50	Gyula Kanta
National list	50	Béla Andaházi-Kasnya
National list	50	Vince Gáspár
National list	50	Lajos Harmathy
National list	50	Lajos Györgyi
National list	50	Pál Hegymegi Kiss
National list	50	Ferenc Dajkovich
National list	50	István Reők
National list	50	Albert Bartha
National list	50	László Vatai
National list	50	József Törő
National list	50	István B. Rácz
National list	50	György Szintén
National list	50	Iván Lenárt
National list	50	Ferenc Juhász
National list	50	Sándor Pali
National list	50	Tibor Horányi
National list	50	István Kiss
National list	50	András Szobek
National list	50	László Rudas
National list	50	Károly Olt
National list	50	Erzsébet Andics
National list	50	Miklós Somogyi
National list	50	Aladár Mód
National list	50	Lajos Papp
National list	50	László Orbán
National list	50	László Piros
National list	50	Gyula Illyés
National list	50	Ferenc B. Farkas
National list	50	Ferenc S. Szabó
National list	50	Manó Buchinger
National list	50	Pál Justus
National list	50	Miklós Kertész
National list	50	József Kőmüves
National list	50	János Pintér
National list	50	Imre Vajda
National list	50	Ferenc Révész
National list	50	Pál Schiffer
National list	50	Imre Pásztor
Honorary mandates	12	György Bölöni
Honorary mandates	12	Sándor Juhász Nagy
Honorary mandates	12	Mihály Károlyi
Honorary mandates	12	Zoltán Kodály
Honorary mandates	12	Béla Miklós
Honorary mandates	12	Gyula Moór
Honorary mandates	12	Pál Pátzay
Honorary mandates	12	Albert Szent-Györgyi
Honorary mandates	12	István Szőnyi
Honorary mandates	12	Áron Tamási
Honorary mandates	12	Rusztem Vámbéry
Honorary mandates	12	Béla Zsedényi
Total	421	
