= Ferenc Duschek =

Hungarian politician

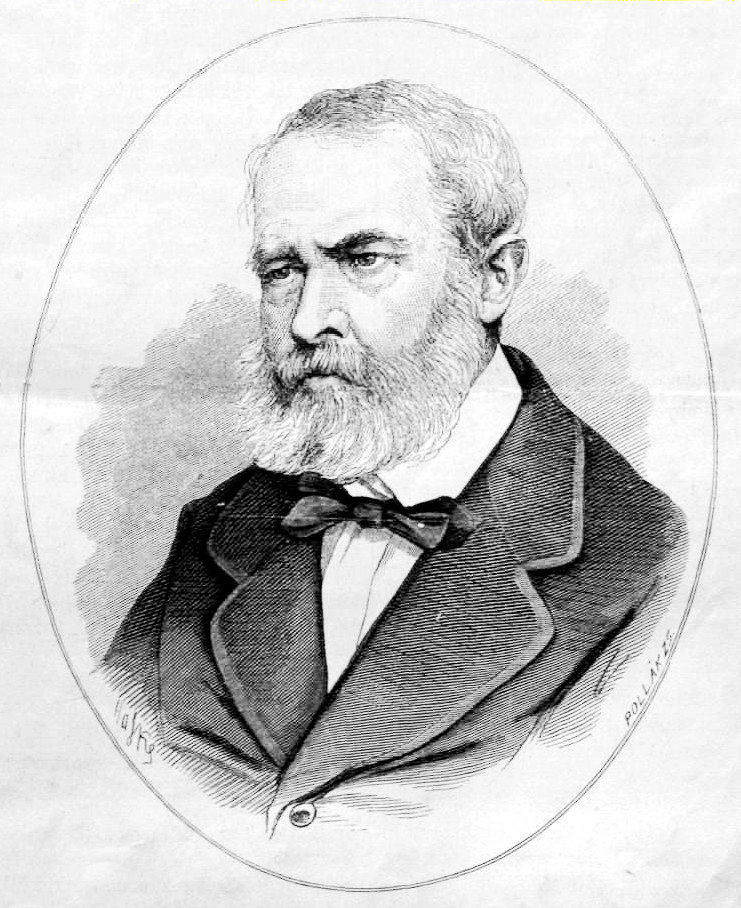

Minister of Finance of Hungary
- In office 12 September 1848 – 11 August 1849
- Preceded by: Lajos Batthyány
- Succeeded by: Menyhért Lónyay

Personal details
- Born: 28 August 1797 Radovesnice, Kingdom of Bohemia
- Died: 17 October 1872 (aged 74) Črnkovec, Austria-Hungary (now Croatia)
- Party: Independent
- Profession: politician
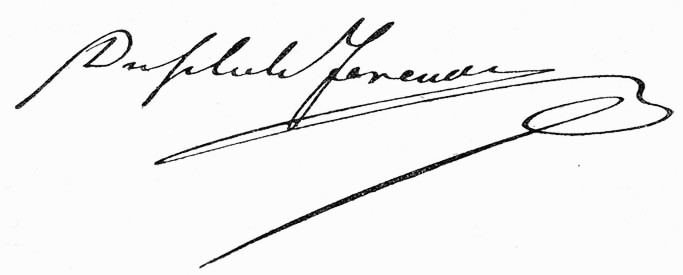
- Signature

Ferenc Duschek (28 August 1797 – 17 October 1872) was a Hungarian politician of Czech origin, who served as Minister of Finance during the Hungarian Revolution of 1848. He started his career as Lajos Kossuth's state secretary. In fact Duschek managed the ministry's affairs because of the minister's occupations. After the Battle of Temesvár he was captured by the Austrian troops. After that he spent his life in full solitude.

Political offices
| Preceded by Lajos Batthyány | Minister of Finance; 1848–1849 | Succeeded by Menyhért Lónyay |
