= Jenő Rácz =

Jenő Rácz may refer to:

- Jenő Rácz (Minister of Finance) (1907–1981), Hungarian politician, Minister of Finance
- Jenő Rátz (1882–1949), Hungarian politician, Minister of Defence, Deputy Prime Minister, Speaker of the House of Magnates
