= Rezső Nyers =

Hungarian politician (1923–2018)

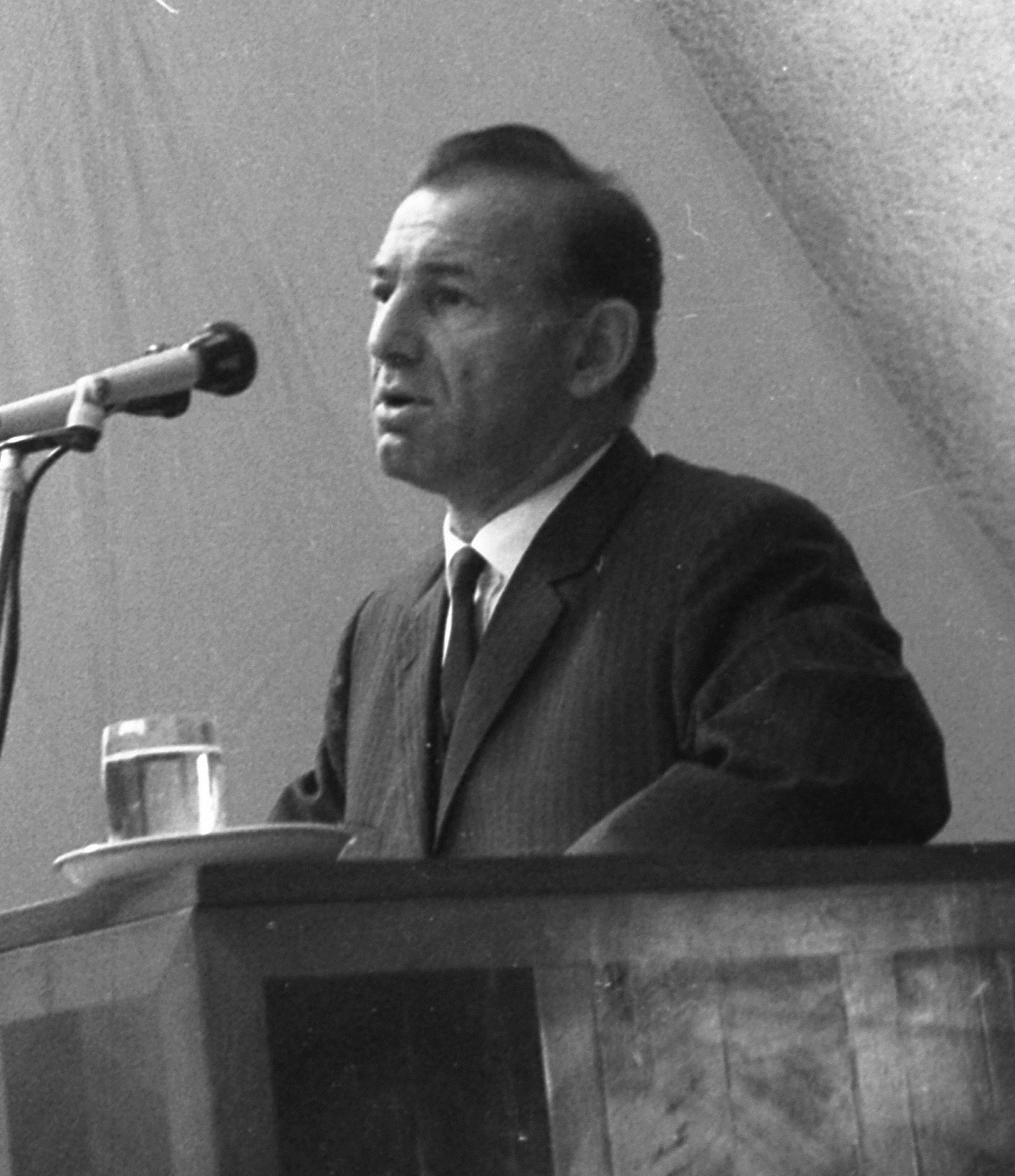
- Nyers in 1970

President of the Hungarian Socialist Party
- In office 7 October 1989 – 27 May 1990
- Preceded by: Himself (as President of the Hungarian Socialist Workers' Party)
- Succeeded by: Gyula Horn

President of the Hungarian Socialist Workers' Party
- In office 26 June 1989 – 7 October 1989
- General Secretary: Károly Grósz
- Preceded by: János Kádár
- Succeeded by: Himself (as President of the Hungarian Socialist Party)

Minister of Finance
- In office 5 January 1960 – 27 November 1962
- Chairman of the Council of Ministers: Ferenc Münnich; János Kádár
- Preceded by: István Antos
- Succeeded by: Mátyás Tímár

Personal details
- Born: 21 March 1923 Budapest, Hungary
- Died: 22 June 2018 (aged 95) Budapest, Hungary
- Party: MSZP (1989–2018)
- Other political affiliations: SZDP (1940–1948); MDP (1948–1956); MSZMP (1956–1989)
- Spouse: Ilona Witz (m. 1946; died 1988)
- Children: 1
- Profession: Politician; economist

Rezső Nyers (Hungarian: [ˈrɛʒøː ˈɲɛrʃ]; 21 March 1923 – 22 June 2018) was a Hungarian politician and economist who served as President of the Hungarian Socialist Workers' Party (MSZMP) for a few months in 1989. As such, he was the last leader of the People's Republic of Hungary. He then became the first leader of the party's successor Hungarian Socialist Party (MSZP) from 1989 to 1990, and also served as Minister of Finance from 1960 to 1962.

== Political career ==
Rezső Nyers was born on 21 March 1923 as the son of Rezső Nyers, Sr. (1898–1956), who served as the last mayor of Kispest. After it became part of Budapest in 1950, he subsequently continued his position as chairman of the council of the 19th district. His mother was weaver Julianna Nagy (1899–1973). Until 1944 Nyers worked as a printer. He joined the Social Democratic Party in 1940. In 1948, the SZDP was forced to merge with the Communists into the Hungarian Working People's Party (MDP)–which was essentially a renamed and enlarged Communist Party. Nyers served as substitute member of the merged party's Central Leadership. From 1948 to 1953, he served as a representative of the National Assembly of Hungary. He was appointed head of a department of the Ministry of Domestic Commerce. In this same year he started his studies at the Karl Marx University of Economic Sciences. In 1954, he was elected member of the Central Leadership. During the András Hegedüs cabinet he served as Minister of Food Industry for a short time. In 1957, a year after the MDP was reorganized as he Hungarian Socialist Workers' Party (MSZMP), Nyers was named to the Central Committee, remaining a member until 1989. He was also a member of the National Assembly from 1958 to 1989. After the Hungarian Revolution of 1956, Nyers also voted in favour of the death sentence for Imre Nagy. In 1968, Nyers drew up the contemporary economic reform package, the New Economic Mechanism, with Prime Minister Jenő Fock. After the failure of the reforms (because of the orthodox Marxists' strengthening), he largely went into eclipse and lost political influence for decades.

Nyers was appointed to the directorial post of the Hungarian Academy of Sciences' Economical Institute in 1974. As a result he resigned from all of his political positions (excluding the MSZMP Central Committee). He became chairman of the Közgazdasági Szemle's Editorial Committee in 1976. He served as chairman of the National Assembly's Reform Committee from 1987. In 1987 he became a member of the government as Minister of State. In the summer of 1988, Secretary-General Károly Grósz announced that he intended to resign from his position of Prime Minister to concentrate entirely on the party organization. Unlike the previous practice, he nominated four candidates, including Nyers, to the position to consult with county party committees, trade unions and the Patriotic People’s Front. As Grósz was aware of the disastrous economic situation and impending insolvency, Miklós Németh, who had established his reputation with his economic expertise, was also included. Finally the 66-year-old Nyers withdrew from candidature in favour of Németh, who took the oath on 24 November 1988. By this time, Nyers had become one of the more prominent members of a faction of radical reformers who wanted to jettison the Communist system in favour of a market economy. Other members of this faction included Németh, fellow Minister of State Imre Pozsgay, and Foreign Minister Gyula Horn.

On 26 June 1989, Nyers was elected as president of the MSZMP, chairing a four-member collective presidency that replaced the Politburo. Nyers was elected by about 78-80 percent of the 1,256 delegates to the party congress. In this position, Nyers now outranked Grósz—thus effectively making him the leader of Hungary. Other members of the collective presidency included Grósz, Németh and Pozsgay. By this time, the MSZMP was no longer a Marxist-Leninist party. At its final congress on 7 October 1989, the MSZMP voted to disband and refound itself as the Hungarian Socialist Party, with Nyers as its first chairman. He was elected to parliament in the 1990 parliamentary election, in which the newly-minted Socialists were severely defeated, winning only 33 seats. Nyers stepped down as chairman shortly afterward, succeeded by Gyula Horn. He remained in parliament until his retirement from politics in 1998.

== Later life ==
In 2011 the issue of the former communist leaders and senior officials' high state pensions were highlighted. His name appeared on Heti Válasz's list, as well as the names of Béla Biszku or György Lázár. Finally, the Metropolitan Administration and Labour Court withdrew his pension supplement in December 2013.

In November 2014, Jobbik MP Előd Novák filed a report against Nyers of accusation of incitement to murder, unlawful detention and abetting. According to Novák, Nyers, as a member of the MSZMP's Central Committee, played an important role in the executions of Imre Nagy and other politicians following the Hungarian Revolution of 1956. On 31 December 2014, the Metropolitan Prosecutor's Office refused the accusation in the absence of a crime. Nyers died on 22 June 2018 at the age of 95 after a short illness.

== Personal life ==
Nyers married historian Ilona Witz in 1946. She died in 1988. Nyers has one child, Rezső Nyers Jr., who served as managing director of the Hungarian National Bank.

== Publications ==
- Szövetkezetek a magyar népi demokráciában (1959)
- A műszaki fejlesztés szerepe gazdaságpolitikánkban (1964)
- Gazdaságpolitikánk és a gazdasági mechanizmus reformja (1968)
- 25 kérdés és válasz gazdaságpolitikai kérdésekről (1969)
- A szocialista gazdasági integráció elvi és gyakorlati kérdései (1969)
- A jövedelmezőség és a jövedelemelosztás problémái hazánkban (1970)
- Szövetkezetpolitikánk kérdései (1970)
- Népgazdaságunk a szocializmus építésének útján (1970)
- Útkeresés – reformok (1988)
- Beszélgetések (with Tibor Huszár, 2004)

== Sources ==
- MTI Ki Kicsoda 2006, Magyar Távirati Iroda, Budapest, 2005, 1273–1274. old.
- Nyers 1996-os országgyűlési életrajza
- Életrajz az MTI 1956-os emlékoldalán

Political offices
| Preceded by Iván Altomáré | Minister of Food Industry; 1956 | Succeeded by Imre Kovács |
| Preceded by István Antos | Minister of Finance; 1960–1962 | Succeeded by Mátyás Tímár |
Party political offices
| Preceded by János Kádár | President of the Hungarian Socialist Workers' Party; 1989 | Succeeded by Party abolished |
| Preceded by New party | Chairman of the Hungarian Socialist Party; 1989–1990 | Succeeded by Gyula Horn |
