= Sándor Wekerle Jr. =

Hungarian politician (1878–1963)

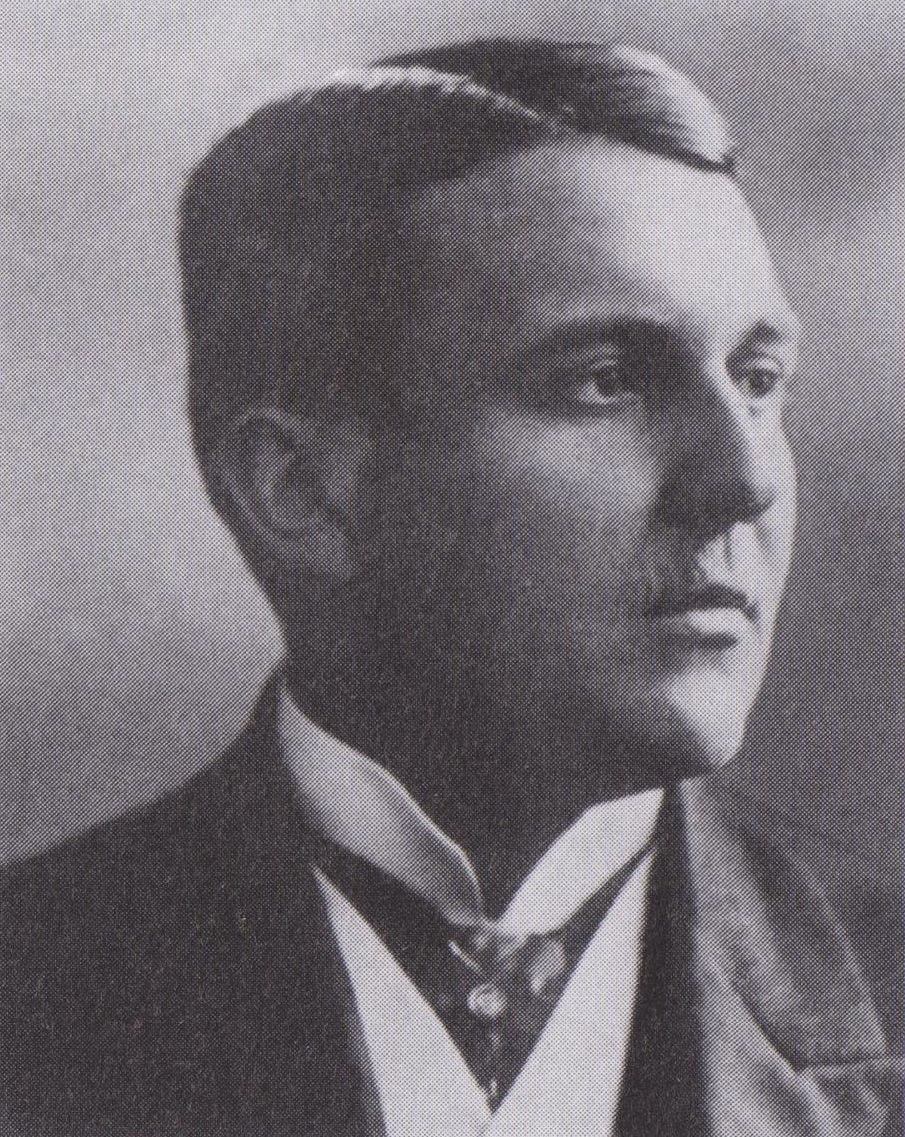

Minister of Finance of Hungary
- In office 5 September 1928 – 24 August 1931
- Prime Minister: István Bethlen
- Preceded by: János Bud
- Succeeded by: Gyula Károlyi

Personal details
- Born: 26 June 1878 Budapest, Austria-Hungary
- Died: 23 December 1963 (aged 85) Budapest, People's Republic of Hungary
- Party: Constitution Party, Unity Party
- Profession: Politician, economist

Sándor Wekerle the Younger (26 June 1878 – 23 December 1963) was a Hungarian politician, who served as Minister of Finance between 1928 and 1931. His father was Sándor Wekerle, who was the Prime Minister of Hungary three times during the Austro-Hungarian Monarchy. Wekerle Jr. studied at the University of Budapest and several other universities in Europe. He was member of the House of Representatives between 1906 and 1910. He fought in the First World War. After the war he taught for the Academy of Trade again. In 1927 he became a member of the House of Magnates.

During his ministership he tried, without significant result, to fight against the effects of the Great Depression. In the late period of the Regency he published many works about the law and finance.

Political offices
Preceded by János Bud	Minister of Finance; 1928–1931	Succeeded by Gyula Károlyi
