= János Bud =

Hungarian politician

Noble János Bud de Budfalva
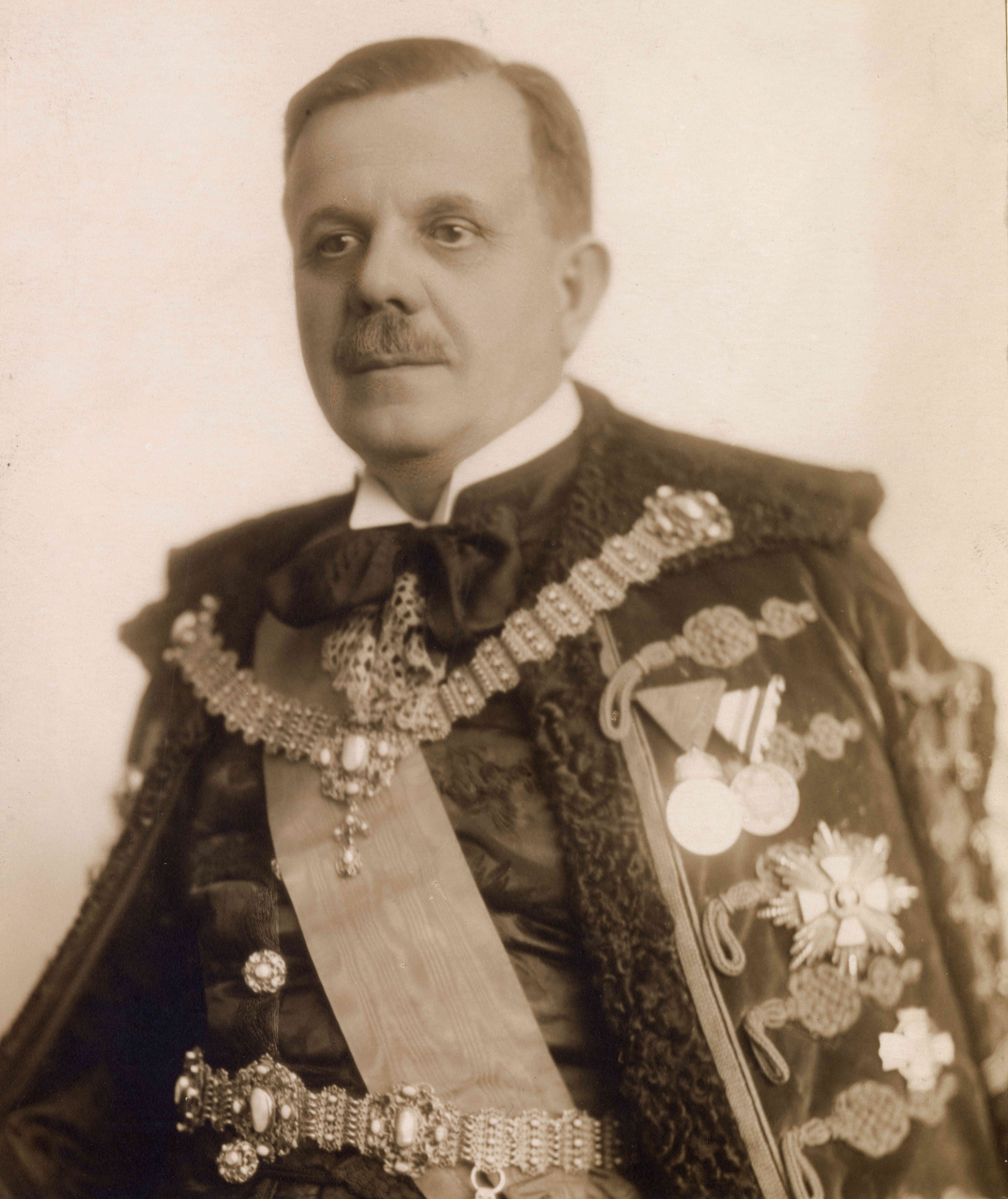

Minister of Finance of Hungary
- In office 25 November 1924 – 5 September 1928
- Prime Minister: István Bethlen
- Preceded by: Frigyes Korányi
- Succeeded by: Sándor Wekerle Jr.

Personal details
- Born: 30 May 1880 Dragomérfalva, Austria-Hungary
- Died: 7 August 1950 (aged 70) Budapest, People's Republic of Hungary
- Party: Unity Party
- Profession: politician, economist

Noble János Bud de Budfalva (30 May 1880 – 7 August 1950) was a Hungarian politician, who served as Minister of Finance between 1924 and 1928. After finishing his law studies he worked for the National Statistical Office. From 1910 he served as secretary aide for the Ministry of Trade. He taught statistics at the University of Budapest. István Bethlen appointed him Minister of Food in 1922. After 1928 he served as Minister of Economics and Minister of Trade. His financial politics the consolidation was in the service of a landowner tycoon's interests.

== Origin ==
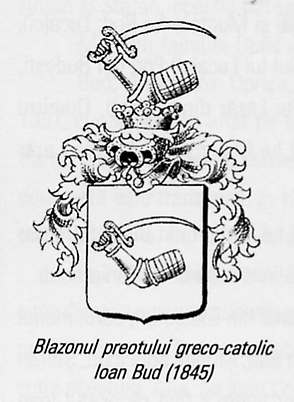
Coat of arms of the Bud family

The Bud family was of Romanian origin. A relative of his, Tit Bud, was a cleric of the Romanian Greek Catholic Church, as well as the vice-president of the "Association for the culture of the Romanian people from Maramureș".

Political offices
Preceded by Frigyes Korányi	Minister of Finance; 1924–1928	Succeeded by Sándor Wekerle Jr.
