= Károly Kerkapoly =

Hungarian politician

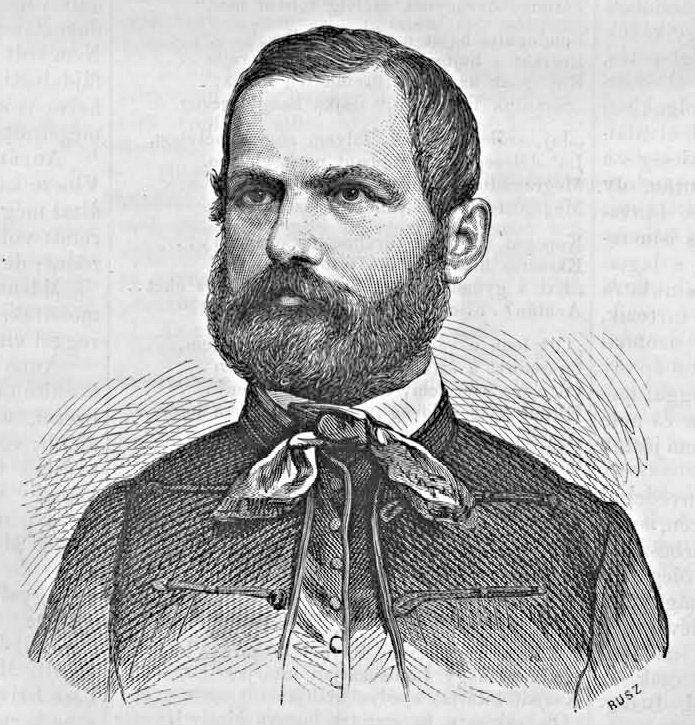

Minister of Finance of Hungary
- In office 21 May 1870 – 19 December 1873
- Preceded by: Menyhért Lónyay
- Succeeded by: József Szlávy

Personal details
- Born: 13 May 1824; Szentgál, Kingdom of Hungary
- Died: 31 December 1891 (aged 67); Budapest, Austria-Hungary
- Political party: Deák Party, Liberal Party
- Spouse: Petronella Gömbös de Jákfa
- Parent(s): János Kerkapoly; Zsuzsanna Bodor
- Profession: politician, teacher

Károly Kerkapoly or Kerkápoly (13 May 1824 - 31 December 1891) was a Hungarian politician, who served as Minister of Finance between 1870 and 1873. He studied in Pápa, in the same school as Mór Jókai and Sándor Petőfi. He worked as a juratus in the National Assembly of 1844. When he finished his law studies he worked for the Zala County's chief prosecutor. Kerkapoly met Ferenc Deák here, who already then sympathized with him and later attention and interest his career was accompanied by Deák. Kerkapoly continued his studies in Halle an der Saale and Berlin, but returned to Hungary when the revolution broke out.

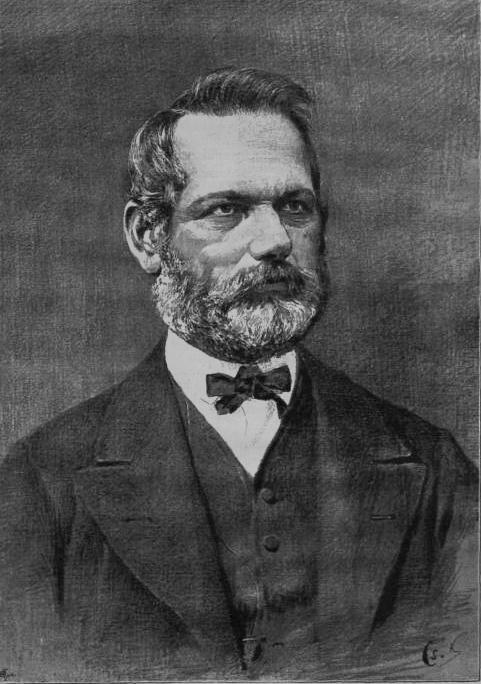
Portrait of Károly Kerkapoly in 1892

He became a corresponding member of the Hungarian Academy of Sciences in 1859. In a movement hulled around the Protestant autonomy in the same year, to the decompression of his church's constitution, he significantly been added. His political career started in 1865 when he became a member of the National Assembly. Under this parliament he was one of the most active believers of the Deák Party. The principal space of his function the parliamentary commissions were, beside this in the newspapers, was at work with a big effect anonymously mostly; the educating the people, the national emancipation, the questions of the public finance and the national defence made it the object of his studies. As a result of this Gyula Andrássy appointed him state secretary of the Ministry of Defence.

Kerkapoly accepted between the most unfortunate financial relations (after Menyhért Lónyay joint Minister of Finance happened appointing) the portfolio of the Finance Minister. He initiated many significant reforms in his quality. The negotiations with few successes continued with the Austrian ministry and the national bank attacked the monarchy's credit case organization by this time for its alteration. Most hurt the confidence sowed in him however, much unfair one and onto a charge embittering him his 158 million big public loans not achieved with big fortune between the heavy relations supplied an occasion. In 1873 he resigned from his position after the appointed dean.

Political offices
Preceded by Menyhért Lónyay	Minister of Finance; 1870–1873	Succeeded by József Szlávy
