= Lajos Reményi-Schneller =

Hungarian politician (1892–1946)

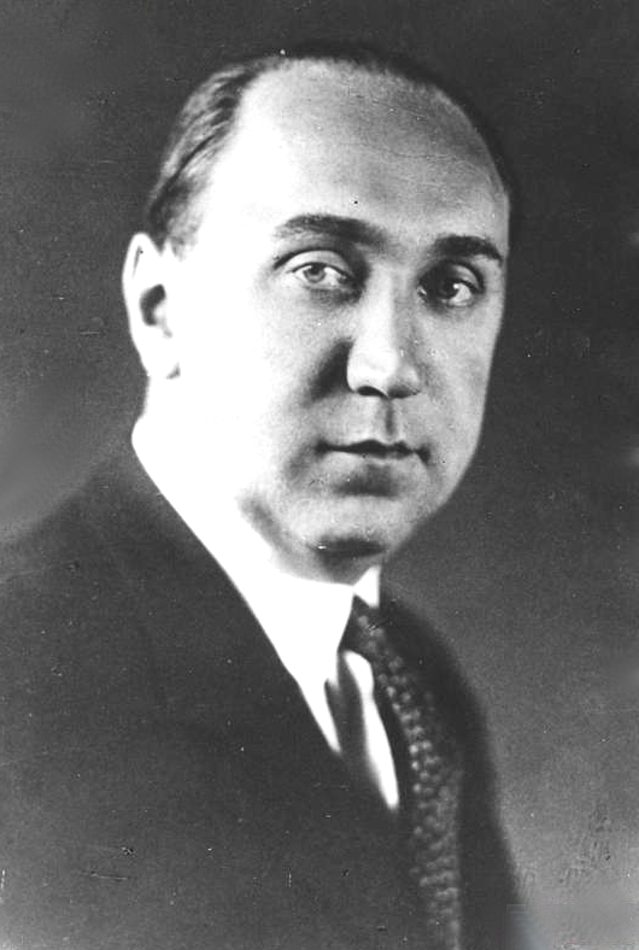

Minister of Finance of Hungary
- In office 9 March 1938 – 27 March 1945
- Prime Minister: Kálmán Darányi; Béla Imrédy; Pál Teleki; Ferenc Keresztes-Fischer; László Bárdossy; Miklós Kállay; Döme Sztójay; Géza Lakatos; Ferenc Szálasi
- Preceded by: Tihamér Fabinyi
- Succeeded by: István Vásáry

Personal details
- Born: 15 March 1892 Budapest, Austria-Hungary
- Died: 24 August 1946 (aged 54) Budapest, Second Hungarian Republic
- Cause of death: Execution by firing squad
- Party: Party of National Unity, Party of Hungarian Life, Arrow Cross Party
- Profession: politician, economist

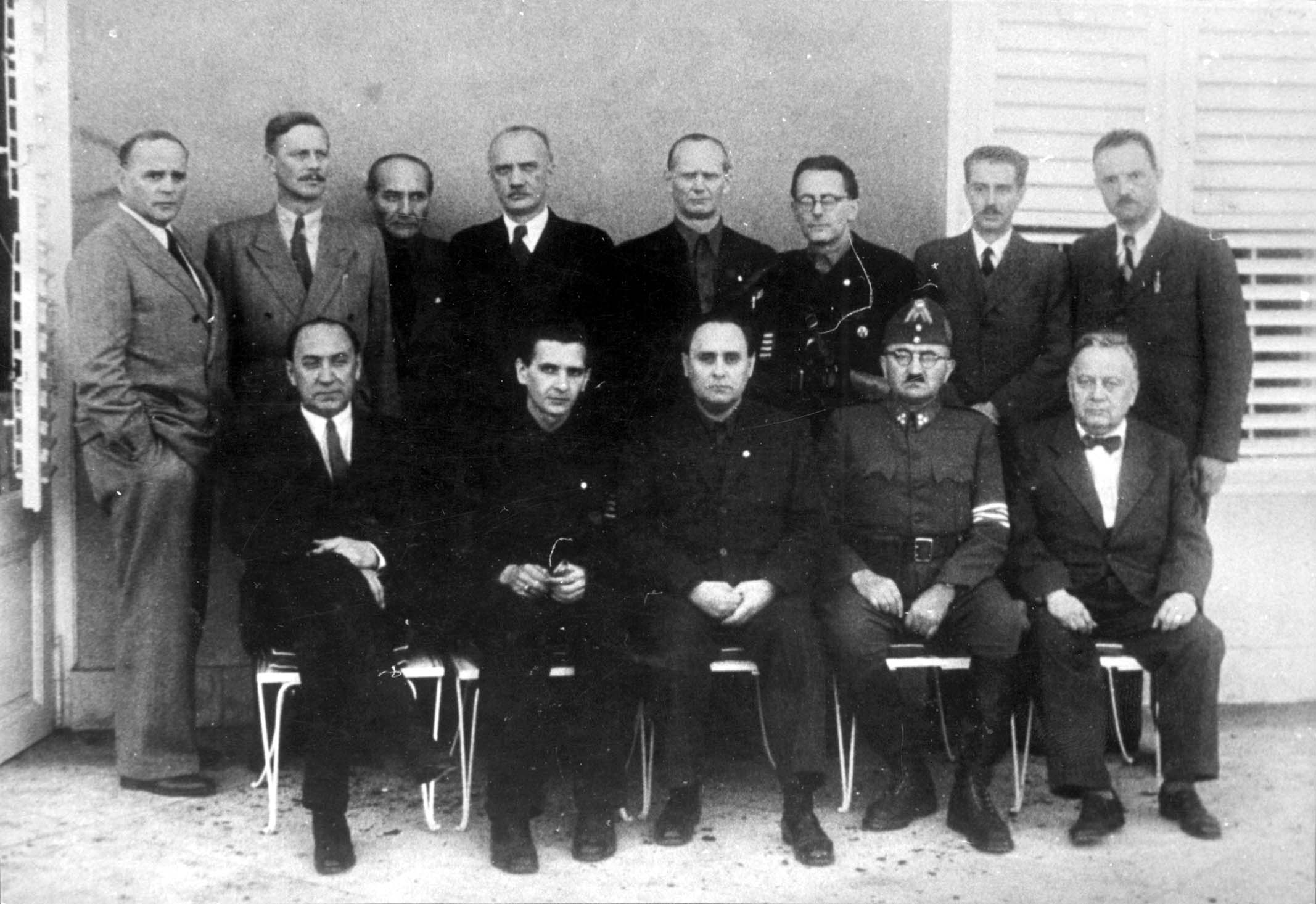
Ministers of the Arrow Cross Party government. Lajos Reményi-Schneller is in the first from left of the lower row.

Lajos Reményi-Schneller (15 March 1892 – 24 August 1946) was a Hungarian politician, who served as Minister of Finance between 1938 and 1945. He started his career in 1923 as the director of the Hungarian Exchange Bank. He became representative in 1935. Kálmán Darányi appointed him Minister of Finance. Reményi-Schneller held this position until the end of the Second World War. His assignment was from the Pál Teleki cabinet until the Miklós Kállay administration.

After the bombing of Kassa on 26 June 1941, Reményi-Schneller along with the Education Minister Bálint Hóman and the Defense Minister General Károly Bartha were the trio of ministers who urged the prime minister László Bárdossy to declare war on the Soviet Union. He pursued Germanophile politics extremely, he regularly informed the Germans about the Hungarian political developments. During his ministership Reményi-Schneller significantly furthered the country's economic delivery with his function for the Nazi Germany.

During the government of prime minister Miklós Kállay, Reményi-Schneller started to work as a spy for German minister plenipotentiary, SA-Obergruppenführer Dietrich von Jagow. After every meeting of the Council of Ministers, Reményi-Schneller would go to the German Legation to sell the complete minutes of the meeting to Jagow. In the fall of 1942, the German Finance Minister Walther Funk wanted a new German-Hungarian economic treaty under which the Reich would be provided with a credit of 2,000 million Reichmarks to buy Hungarian goods, which would be paid off after the war. Funk's offer led to a sharp disagreement between Reményi-Schneller and Lajos Baranyai, the president of the National Bank, which ended with Baranyai's resignation. In the spring of 1943, Reményi-Schneller put forward a plan to impoverish Hungarian Jews by a high capital levy tax, which was rejected by Kállay. After the German occupation of Hungary on 19 March 1944, Reményi-Schneller stayed on as Finance Minister in the government of General Döme Sztójay as his right-wing views made him acceptable to the Reich. On 2 June 1944, Reményi-Schneller signed an agreement with the German minister plenipotentiary, SS-Brigadeführer Edmund Veesenmayer, under which Hungary would pay Germany 200 million pengós a month, coving all of the German occupation costs.

In the cabinets of General Döme Sztójay and General Géza Lakatos, Reményi-Schneller worked as a spy for Veesenmayer selling him information about what was being discussed at the Council of Ministers. In the spring of 1944, a Hungarian Jewish leader, Dr. Ernő Pető, visited Reményi-Schneller to complain about rumors that the Jews being deported for "resettlement in the East" were in fact being exterminated. Reményi-Schneller told Petô that he had investigated these rumours and stated there was no truth to them. On 7 September 1944, Lakatos first revealed to the council he was considering signing an armistice with the Soviet Union, a proposal that Reményi-Schneller vehemently opposed. Reményi-Schneller also informed Veesenmayer that Lakatos had discussed an armistice with the cabinet, which led Veesenmayer to begin planning for what became Operation Panzerfaust to depose both the Regent, Admiral Miklós Horthy and Lakatos to replace both with Ferenc Szálasi, the leader of the fascist Arrow Cross Party.. On 15 October 1944, when Horthy attempted to sign an armistice with the Soviet Union, Lakatos resigned as prime minister. Horthy rejected the resignation and reappointed both Lakatos and his entire cabinet, including Reményi-Schneller, an action which surprised everyone as by this point it was widely suspected that Reményi-Schneller was a spy for Germany. After the Germans deposed Horthy, Reményi-Schneller stayed on as Finance Minister in the Arrow Cross regime, serving Ferenc Szálasi..

After the fall of Budapest he tried to escape into Western Europe but the arriving American troops captured him with other members of the Arrow Cross Party's government. He was tried by the People's Tribunal in Budapest in open sessions and sentenced to death for war crimes and high treason. Reményi-Schneller was shot in 1946 in Budapest.

== Books and Articles ==
- Cornelius, Deborah S. (2011). Hungary in World War II Caught in the Cauldron. New York: Fordham University Press. ISBN 9780823237739.
- Magyar Életrajzi Lexikon

Political offices
Preceded by Tihamér Fabinyi	Minister of Finance; 1938–1945	Succeeded by István Vásáry
