= István Antos =

Hungarian politician (1908–1960)

Minister of Finance of Hungary
- In office 9 May 1957 – 5 January 1960
- Prime Minister: János Kádár; Ferenc Münnich
- Preceded by: István Kossa
- Succeeded by: Rezső Nyers

Personal details
- Born: 25 June 1908 Nagyszombat, Austria-Hungary
- Died: 5 January 1960 (aged 51) Budapest, People's Republic of Hungary
- Party: MDP, MSZMP
- Profession: politician, economist

István Antos (25 June 1908 - 5 January 1960) was a Hungarian politician, who served as Minister of Finance from 1957 until his death. He joined the Hungarian Communist Party in 1945. He had a significant role in the reorganizing of the economical system. He served as general secretary of the National Economical Council. From 1945, he was the state secretary of the Ministry of Finance. From 1953, he was member of the National Assembly of Hungary.

Political offices
Preceded by István Kossa	Minister of Finance; 1957–1960	Succeeded by Rezső Nyers
