= Radovesnice II =

- Municipality
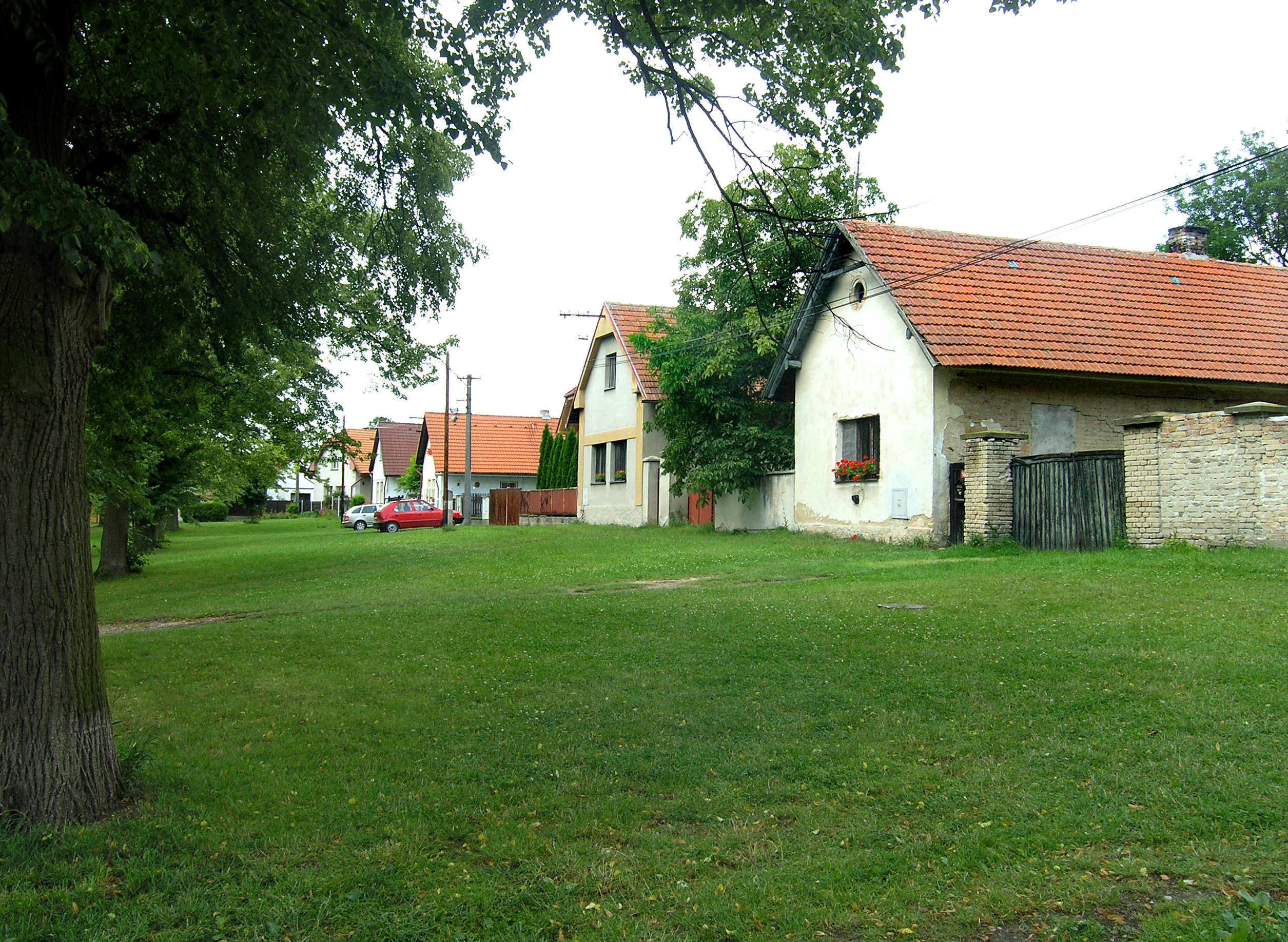
- Common in the southern part

- Location in the Czech Republic
- Coordinates: 50°6′15″N 15°22′4″E
- Country: Czech Republic
- Region: Central Bohemian
- District: Kolín
- First mentioned: 1347

Area
  - Total: 12.86 km^{2} (4.97 sq mi)
- Elevation: 225 m (738 ft)

Population (2026-01-01)
  - Total: 523
  - Density: 40.7/km^{2} (105/sq mi)
- Time zone: UTC+1 (CET)
  - Summer (DST): UTC+2 (CEST)
- Postal codes: 281 26, 281 28
- Website: www.radovesnice2.cz

Radovesnice II is a municipality and village in Kolín District in the Central Bohemian Region of the Czech Republic. It has about 500 inhabitants.

The Roman numeral in the name serves to distinguish it from the nearby municipality of the same name, Radovesnice I.

== Administrative division ==
Radovesnice II consists of two municipal parts (in brackets population according to the 2021 census):

- Radovesnice II (465)
- Rozehnaly (48)

== Demographics ==
Historical population
Year	Pop.	±%
1869	648	—
1880	753	+16.2%
1890	789	+4.8%
1900	900	+14.1%
1910	958	+6.4%
1921	868	−9.4%
1930	835	−3.8%
1950	664	−20.5%
1961	618	−6.9%
1970	568	−8.1%
1980	514	−9.5%
1991	446	−13.2%
2001	421	−5.6%
2011	443	+5.2%
2021	513	+15.8%
Source: Censuses
