= Tit Bud =

Noble Tit Bud de Budfalva
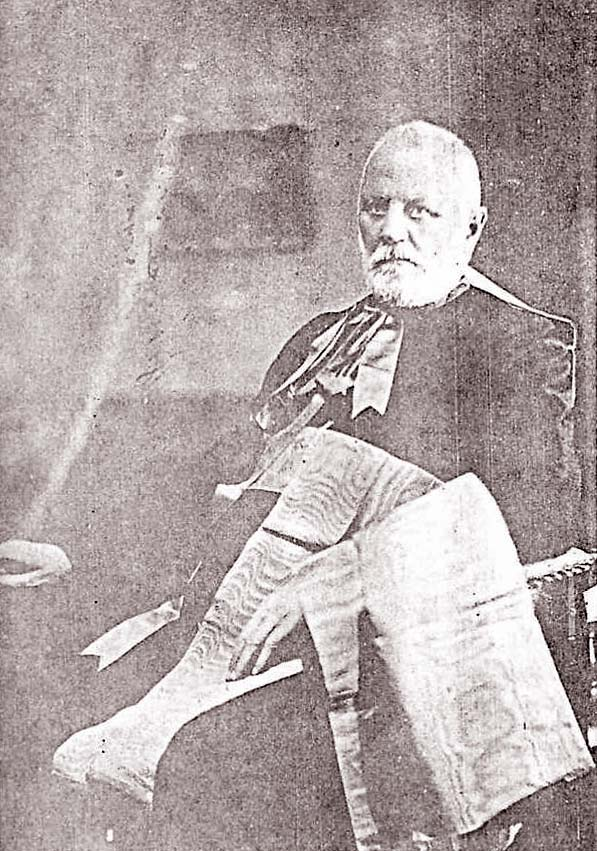

Personal details
- Born: 24 December 1846
- Died: 19 August 1917 (aged 70)
- Profession: Priest, author, folklorist, translator, historian

Noble Tit Bud de Budfalva (24 December 1846 – 19 August 1917) was an Imperial Austrian-born Romanian Greek Catholic priest, author, folklorist, translator, historian, aristocrat, vicar of Maramureș, director of the Boarding school of Sighet, vice-president of the "Association for the culture of the Romanian people from Maramureș" and president of the "Organization of Romanian teachers from Maramureș". He spoke seven languages.

== Works ==
- Ritual pentru pruncii şcolari din şcoalele elementare poporale (Ritual for school children in popular elementary schools), Szamosújvár, Editura tipografiei diecezane, 1910, OCLC 1016479663
- Date istorice despre protopopiatele, parohiile mănăstirile române din Maramureș din timpurile vechi până în anul 1911 (Historical data about the archdioceses, parishes, Romanian monasteries in Maramureș from ancient times until 1911), Gherla, Ed. Cu literile tipografiei diecezane, 1911, OCLC 1016492105
- Tipic preoţesc din cărţile rituale (Typical priesthood from ritual books), Tipografia "Aurora" A. Todoran, Gherla, 1894, OCLC 1016473879
- Viaţa sânţilor (The life of the saints), Gherla, Tipografia Diecesană, 1897, OCLC 1043310920
- Tipic bisericesc din cărţile rituali şi manuale de acest soiu (Typical church from ritual books and textbooks of this kind), Gherla, Cu literile tipografiei diecezane, 1906, OCLC 1016473661
- Insămnări şi date despre înfiinţarea parochiei gr.-cat. române din Sigetul Maramureşului (Máramarossziget) (Inseminations and data about the establishment of the parish gr.-cat. Romanians from the Siget of Maramures), Gherla, ed. cu literele Tipografiei Diecesane, 1905, OCLC 895400186, OCLC 1132624506
- Catechese pentru pruncii scolari din scolele elementare poporale (Catechesis for school children in public elementary schools), Gherla, 1977, OCLC 1079076030
- Poezii populare din Maramureș (Popular poems from Maramureș), Bucharest 1908, 86 p. (Published by the Romanian Academy), OCLC 162631091
- Concordantia biblica reale seu Locuri scripturali in ordinea alfabetica a materieloru diverse (Real biblical concordance or Scriptural places in the alphabetical order of various subjects), Gherla, 1876, OCLC 1079078615
- Cuventari funebrale şi iertaţiuni din auctori renumiţi şi din scriptele [lui] Georgiu Molnaru (Funeral speeches and pardons from famous authors and from the scripts of Georgiu Molnaru), Gherla, 1878, OCLC 1079234867
- Asociaţiunea pentru cultura poporului romîn din Maramureş: istoric, realizări (Association for the culture of the Romanian people from Maramureş: history, achievements), Transilvania, 1902, OCLC 898938978
- Disertaţiune despre episcopii şi vicarii români din Maramureş (Dissertation about the Romanian bishops and vicars of Maramureş), Tipografia Diecezană, Gherla, 1891.
- Doine şi hore poporale din Maramureş (Doine and folk choirs from Maramureş), 1872,
- Viaţa Preacuratei Vergure Maria (The life of the Blessed Virgin Mary), Gherla, 1879, 1886, 1897
- Translations:
  - De unde nu este rentorcere: roman de Adrien Gabrielly (Where there is no return: novel by Adrien Gabrielly), Pesta, 1872 OCLC 1043083413
  - Translations from A. Daudet

== Family ==
He was a member of the Bud de Budfalva noble family, a cadet branch of the House of Both. He was the brother of Noble János Bud de Budfalva, Minister of Finance (1924–1928), Minister of Food, Minister of Economy of the Kingdom of Hungary and cousin of Lady Irina Bud de Budfalva (1901–1980), landowner and philanthropist from Oaș Country, wife of Baron Vasile Mihalca de Dolha and Petrova.
