= Minister of Finance (Hungary) =

Cabinet minister responsible for finances in Hungary

Minister of Finance of Hungary
- Magyarország pénzügyminisztere

- Incumbent; András Kármán since 13 May 2026
- Ministry of Finance
- Type: Cabinet minister
- Member of: Cabinet; Council; Parliament
- Nominator: Prime Minister of Hungary
- Appointer: President of Hungary
- Inaugural holder: Lajos Kossuth
- Formation: 7 April 1848

The Minister of Finance (Hungarian: pénzügyminiszter) is a member of the Hungarian cabinet and the head of the Ministry of Finance. The current minister is András Kármán.

The position was called People's Commissar of Finance (Hungarian: pénzügyi népbiztos) during the Hungarian Soviet Republic in 1919, and Minister of National Economy (Hungarian: nemzetgazdasági miniszter) between 2010 and 2018.

== Ministers of Finance (1848–1919) ==
=== Hungarian Kingdom (1848–1849) ===
Parties Opposition Party Independent

No.	Portrait	Name (Birth–Death)	Term of office		Political party	Cabinet	Assembly (Election)
1		Lajos Kossuth (1802–1894)	7 April 1848	12 September 1848	Opposition Party	Batthyány	Last Diet
1		Lajos Kossuth (1802–1894)	7 April 1848	12 September 1848	Opposition Party	Batthyány	1 (1848)
—		Lajos Batthyány (1807–1849) acting	12 September 1848	28 September 1848	Opposition Party	Batthyány	1 (1848)
2		Ferenc Duschek (1797–1872)	28 September 1848	2 October 1848	Independent	Batthyány	1 (1848)
2		Ferenc Duschek (1797–1872)	2 October 1848	14 April 1849	Independent	Committee of National Defence	1 (1848)

=== Hungarian State (1849) ===
Parties Independent

No.	Portrait	Name (Birth–Death)	Term of office		Political party	Cabinet	Assembly (Election)
1		Ferenc Duschek (1797–1872)	14 April 1849	2 May 1849	Independent	Committee of National Defence	1 (1848)
1		Ferenc Duschek (1797–1872)	2 May 1849	11 August 1849	Independent	Szemere	1 (1848)

After the collapse of the Hungarian Revolution of 1848, the Hungarian Kingdom became an integral part of the Austrian Empire until 1867, when dual Austro-Hungarian Monarchy was created.

=== Hungarian Kingdom (1867–1918) ===
Parties Deák Party/Liberal Party/National Party of Work Left Centre National Constitution Party F48P/F48P–Károlyi Independent

No.	Portrait	Name (Birth–Death)	Term of office		Political party	Cabinet	Assembly (Election)
1		Menyhért Lónyay (1822–1884)	20 February 1867	21 May 1870	Deák Party	Andrássy; DP	3 (1865)
1		Menyhért Lónyay (1822–1884)	20 February 1867	21 May 1870	Deák Party	Andrássy; DP	4 (1869)
2		Károly Kerkapoly (1824–1891)	21 May 1870	14 November 1871	Deák Party	Andrássy; DP	4 (1869)
2		Károly Kerkapoly (1824–1891)	14 November 1871	4 December 1872	Deák Party	Lónyay; DP	4 (1869)
2		Károly Kerkapoly (1824–1891)	14 November 1871	4 December 1872	Deák Party	Lónyay; DP	5 (1872)
2		Károly Kerkapoly (1824–1891)	4 December 1872	19 December 1873	Deák Party	Szlávy; DP	5 (1872)
—		József Szlávy (1818–1900) acting	19 December 1873	21 March 1874	Deák Party	Szlávy; DP	5 (1872)
3		Kálmán Ghyczy (1808–1888)	21 March 1874	2 March 1875	Left Centre	Bittó; DP–BK	5 (1872)
4		Kálmán Széll (1843–1915)	2 March 1875	20 October 1875	Liberal Party	Wenckheim; SZP	5 (1872)
4		Kálmán Széll (1843–1915)	20 October 1875	3 October 1878	Liberal Party	K. Tisza; SZP	6 (1875)
4		Kálmán Széll (1843–1915)	20 October 1875	3 October 1878	Liberal Party	K. Tisza; SZP	7 (1878)
—		Kálmán Széll (1843–1915) acting	3 October 1878	11 October 1878	Liberal Party	K. Tisza; SZP	7 (1878)
—		Kálmán Tisza (1830–1902) acting	11 October 1878	5 December 1878	Liberal Party	K. Tisza; SZP	7 (1878)
5		Gyula Szapáry (1832–1905)	5 December 1878	11 February 1887	Liberal Party	K. Tisza; SZP	7 (1878)
—		Kálmán Tisza (1830–1902) acting	11 February 1887	9 April 1889	Liberal Party	K. Tisza; SZP	7 (1878)
6		Sándor Wekerle (1848–1921); 1st term	9 April 1889	13 March 1890	Liberal Party	K. Tisza; SZP	7 (1878)
6		Sándor Wekerle (1848–1921); 1st term	13 March 1890	17 November 1892	Liberal Party	Szapáry; SZP	11 (1892)
6		Sándor Wekerle (1848–1921); 1st term	17 November 1892	15 January 1895	Liberal Party	Wekerle I SZP	11 (1892)
7		László Lukács (1850–1932); 1st term	15 January 1895	26 February 1899	Liberal Party	Bánffy; SZP	11 (1892)
7		László Lukács (1850–1932); 1st term	15 January 1895	26 February 1899	Liberal Party	Bánffy; SZP	12 (1896)
7		László Lukács (1850–1932); 1st term	26 February 1899	27 June 1903	Liberal Party	Széll; SZP	12 (1896)
7		László Lukács (1850–1932); 1st term	26 February 1899	27 June 1903	Liberal Party	Széll; SZP	13 (1901)
7		László Lukács (1850–1932); 1st term	27 June 1903	3 November 1903	Liberal Party	Khuen-Héderváry I SZP	13 (1901)
7		László Lukács (1850–1932); 1st term	3 November 1903	18 June 1905	Liberal Party	I. Tisza I SZP	13 (1901)
—		Géza Fejérváry (1833–1914) acting	18 June 1905	6 March 1906	Independent	Fejérváry; SZP	14 (1905)
8		Ferenc Hegedűs (1856–1909)	6 March 1906	8 April 1906	Independent	Fejérváry; SZP	14 (1905)
(6)		Sándor Wekerle (1848–1921); 2nd term	8 April 1906	17 January 1910	National Constitution Party	Wekerle II; F48P–OAP–KNP–PDP	15 (1906)
(7)		László Lukács (1850–1932); 2nd term	17 January 1910	22 April 1912	National Party of Work	Khuen-Héderváry II; NMP	15 (1906)
(7)		László Lukács (1850–1932); 2nd term	17 January 1910	22 April 1912	National Party of Work	Khuen-Héderváry II; NMP	16 (1910)
9		János Teleszky (1868–1939)	22 April 1912	10 June 1913	National Party of Work	Lukács; NMP	16 (1910)
9		János Teleszky (1868–1939)	10 June 1913	15 June 1917	National Party of Work	I. Tisza II; NMP	16 (1910)
10		Gusztáv Gratz (1875–1946)	15 June 1917	23 August 1917	National Party of Work	Esterházy; NMP–F48P–OAP–PDP–KNP	16 (1910)
10		Gusztáv Gratz (1875–1946)	23 August 1917	16 September 1917	National Party of Work	Wekerle III; NMP–F48P–OAP–PDP–KNP	16 (1910)
—		Sándor Wekerle (1848–1921) acting	16 September 1917	11 February 1918	National Constitution Party	Wekerle III; NMP–F48P–OAP–PDP–KNP	16 (1910)
11		Sándor Popovics (1862–1935)	11 February 1918	31 October 1918	National Constitution Party	Wekerle III; NMP–F48P–OAP–PDP–KNP	16 (1910)
—		János Grünn (1864–1932)	30 October 1918	31 October 1918	Independent	Hadik not formed	16 (1910)
—		Mihály Károlyi (1875–1955) acting	31 October 1918	16 November 1918	F48P–Károlyi	M. Károlyi; F48P–Károlyi–PRP–MSZDP	MNT (—)

=== Hungarian People's Republic (1918–1919) ===
Parties F48P–Károlyi Civic Radical Party (PRP)

No.	Portrait	Name (Birth–Death)	Term of office		Political party	Cabinet	Assembly (Election)
—		Mihály Károlyi (1875–1955) acting	16 November 1918	25 November 1918	F48P–Károlyi	M. Károlyi; F48P–Károlyi–PRP–MSZDP	MNT (—)
1		Pál Szende (1879–1934)	25 November 1918	19 January 1919	PRP	M. Károlyi; F48P–Károlyi–PRP–MSZDP	MNT (—)
1		Pál Szende (1879–1934)	19 January 1919	21 March 1919	PRP	Berinkey; F48P–Károlyi–PRP–MSZDP–OKGFP	MNT (—)

== People's Commissars of Finance (1919) ==
=== Hungarian Soviet Republic (1919) ===
Parties MSZP/SZKMMP

No.	Portrait	Name (Birth–Death)	Term of office		Political party	Cabinet	Assembly (Election)
1		Jenő Varga (1879–1964)	21 March 1919	3 April 1919	MSZP	Revolutionary Governing Council; MSZP/SZKMMP	TOGY (—)
2		Béla Székely (1889–1939) serving with Gyula Lengyel	3 April 1919	24 June 1919	MSZP/SZKMMP	Revolutionary Governing Council; MSZP/SZKMMP	TOGY (—)
(2)		Béla Székely (1889–1939)	24 June 1919	1 August 1919	MSZP/SZKMMP	Revolutionary Governing Council; MSZP/SZKMMP	TOGY (—)
2		Gyula Lengyel (1888–1941) serving with Béla Székely	3 April 1919	24 June 1919	MSZP/SZKMMP	Revolutionary Governing Council; MSZP/SZKMMP	TOGY (—)

==== Counter-revolutionary governments (1919) ====
Parties Independent

No.	Portrait	Name (Birth–Death)	Term of office		Political party	Cabinet	Assembly (Election)
—		Lajos Solymossy; 1st term	5 May 1919	31 May 1919	Independent	Arad	—
—		Gusztáv Gratz (1875–1946)	31 May 1919	6 June 1919	Independent	Szeged I	—
—		Lajos Solymossy; 2nd term	6 June 1919	12 July 1919	Independent	Szeged II	—
—		Antal Éber (1872–1950)	12 July 1919	12 August 1919	Independent	Szeged III	—

== Ministers of Finance (1919–2010) ==
=== Hungarian People's Republic (1919) ===
Parties MSZDP

No.	Portrait	Name (Birth–Death)	Term of office		Political party	Cabinet	Assembly (Election)
1		Ferenc Miákits (1876–1924)	1 August 1919	6 August 1919 (deposed)	MSZDP	Peidl; MSZDP	—
—		Gyula Peidl (1873–1943) acting for Ferenc Miákits	2 August 1919	6 August 1919 (deposed)	MSZDP	Peidl; MSZDP	—

=== Hungarian Republic (1919–1920) ===
Parties National Smallholders and Agricultural Labourers Party (OKGFP) Independent

No.	Portrait	Name (Birth–Death)	Term of office		Political party	Cabinet	Assembly (Election)
1		János Grünn (1864–1932)	15 August 1919	12 September 1919	Independent	Friedrich; KNP/KNEP–OKGFP	—
2		Frigyes Korányi (1869–1935)	12 September 1919	24 November 1919	OKGFP	Friedrich; KNP/KNEP–OKGFP	—
2		Frigyes Korányi (1869–1935)	24 November 1919	29 February 1920	OKGFP	Huszár; KNEP–OKGFP–MSZDP–NDPP	—

=== Hungarian Kingdom (1920–1946) ===
Parties National Smallholders and Agricultural Labourers Party (OKGFP) KNEP EP–NEP–MÉP Independent

No.	Portrait	Name (Birth–Death)	Term of office		Political party	Cabinet	Assembly (Election)
1		Frigyes Korányi (1869–1935); 1st term	29 February 1920	15 March 1920	OKGFP	Huszár; KNEP–OKGFP–MSZDP–NDPP	—
1		Frigyes Korányi (1869–1935); 1st term	15 March 1920	19 July 1920	OKGFP	Simonyi-Semadam; KNEP–OKGFP	17 (1920)
1		Frigyes Korányi (1869–1935); 1st term	19 July 1920	16 December 1920	OKGFP	Teleki I KNEP–OKGFP	17 (1920)
2		Lóránt Hegedüs (1872–1943)	16 December 1920	14 April 1921	Independent	Teleki I KNEP–OKGFP	17 (1920)
2		Lóránt Hegedüs (1872–1943)	14 April 1921	27 September 1921	Independent	Bethlen (KNEP–OKGFP)→EP	17 (1920)
—		Lajos Hegyeshalmi (1862–1925) acting	27 September 1921	4 October 1921	KNEP	Bethlen (KNEP–OKGFP)→EP	17 (1920)
—		István Bethlen (1874–1946) acting	4 October 1921	3 December 1921	KNEP	Bethlen (KNEP–OKGFP)→EP	17 (1920)
3		Tibor Kállay (1881–1964)	3 December 1921	2 February 1922	KNEP	Bethlen (KNEP–OKGFP)→EP	17 (1920)
(3)		Tibor Kállay (1881–1964)	2 February 1922	20 February 1924	EP	Bethlen (KNEP–OKGFP)→EP	17 (1920)
(3)		Tibor Kállay (1881–1964)	2 February 1922	20 February 1924	EP	Bethlen (KNEP–OKGFP)→EP	18 (1922)
—		Lajos Walko (1880–1954) acting	20 February 1924	25 March 1924	EP	Bethlen (KNEP–OKGFP)→EP	18 (1922)
(1)		Frigyes Korányi (1869–1935); 2nd term	25 March 1924	15 November 1924	EP	Bethlen (KNEP–OKGFP)→EP	18 (1922)
4		János Bud (1880–1950)	15 November 1924	5 September 1928	EP	Bethlen (KNEP–OKGFP)→EP	18 (1922)
4		János Bud (1880–1950)	15 November 1924	5 September 1928	EP	Bethlen (KNEP–OKGFP)→EP	19 (1926)
5		Sándor Wekerle Jr. (1878–1963)	5 September 1928	24 August 1931	EP	Bethlen (KNEP–OKGFP)→EP	19 (1926)
5		Sándor Wekerle Jr. (1878–1963)	5 September 1928	24 August 1931	EP	Bethlen (KNEP–OKGFP)→EP	20 (1931)
—		Gyula Károlyi (1871–1947) acting	24 August 1931	16 December 1931	EP	G. Károlyi; EP–KGSZP	20 (1931)
(1)		Frigyes Korányi (1869–1935); 3rd term	16 December 1931	1 October 1932	EP	G. Károlyi; EP–KGSZP	20 (1931)
6		Béla Imrédy (1891–1946)	1 October 1932	6 January 1935	NEP	Gömbös; NEP	20 (1931)
7		Tihamér Fabinyi (1890–1953)	6 January 1935	6 October 1936	NEP	Gömbös; NEP	20 (1931)
7		Tihamér Fabinyi (1890–1953)	6 January 1935	6 October 1936	NEP	Gömbös; NEP	21 (1935)
7		Tihamér Fabinyi (1890–1953)	6 October 1936	9 March 1938	NEP	Darányi; NEP	21 (1935)
8		Lajos Reményi-Schneller (1892–1946)	9 March 1938	14 May 1938	NEP	Darányi; NEP	21 (1935)
8		Lajos Reményi-Schneller (1892–1946)	14 May 1938	16 February 1939	NEP	Imrédy; NEP	21 (1935)
(8)		Lajos Reményi-Schneller (1892–1946)	16 February 1939	3 April 1941	MÉP	Teleki II; MÉP	21 (1935)
(8)		Lajos Reményi-Schneller (1892–1946)	16 February 1939	3 April 1941	MÉP	Teleki II; MÉP	22 (1939)
(8)		Lajos Reményi-Schneller (1892–1946)	3 April 1941	9 March 1942	MÉP	Bárdossy; MÉP	22 (1939)
(8)		Lajos Reményi-Schneller (1892–1946)	9 March 1942	22 March 1944	MÉP	Kállay; MÉP	22 (1939)
(8)		Lajos Reményi-Schneller (1892–1946)	22 March 1944	29 August 1944	MÉP	Sztójay; MÉP–MMP	22 (1939)
(8)		Lajos Reményi-Schneller (1892–1946)	29 August 1944	16 October 1944	MÉP	Lakatos; MÉP	22 (1939)

==== Government of National Unity (1944–1945) ====
Parties Independent

No.	Portrait	Name (Birth–Death)	Term of office		Political party	Cabinet	Assembly (Election)
1		Lajos Reményi-Schneller (1892–1946)	16 October 1944	28 March 1945	Independent	Szálasi; NYKP–MMP	—

==== Soviet-backed provisional governments (1944–1946) ====
Parties FKGP

No.	Portrait	Name (Birth–Death)	Term of office		Political party	Cabinet	Assembly (Election)
1		István Vásáry (1887–1955)	22 December 1944	21 July 1945	FKGP	Provisional National Government; FKGP–MKP–MSZDP–NPP–PDP	INGY (1944)
2		Imre Oltványi (1893–1963)	21 July 1945	15 November 1945	FKGP	Provisional National Government; FKGP–MKP–MSZDP–NPP–PDP	INGY (1944)
3		Ferenc Gordon (1893–1971)	15 November 1945	1 February 1946	FKGP	Tildy; FKGP–MKP–MSZDP–NPP	23 (1945)

=== Hungarian Republic (1946–1949) ===
Parties FKGP MDP

No.	Portrait	Name (Birth–Death)	Term of office		Political party	Cabinet	Assembly (Election)
1		Ferenc Gordon (1893–1971)	1 February 1946	26 August 1946	FKGP	F. Nagy; FKGP–MKP–MSZDP–NPP	23 (1945)
2		Jenő Rácz (1907–1981)	26 August 1946	14 March 1947	FKGP	F. Nagy; FKGP–MKP–MSZDP–NPP	23 (1945)
3		Miklós Nyárádi (1905–1976)	14 March 1947	31 May 1947	FKGP	F. Nagy; FKGP–MKP–MSZDP–NPP	23 (1945)
3		Miklós Nyárádi (1905–1976)	31 May 1947	10 December 1948	FKGP	Dinnyés; MKP–FKGP–MSZDP–NPP	23 (1945)
3		Miklós Nyárádi (1905–1976)	31 May 1947	10 December 1948	FKGP	Dinnyés; MKP–FKGP–MSZDP–NPP	24 (1947)
—		Ernő Gerő (1898–1980) acting for Miklós Nyárádi	3 December 1948	10 December 1948	MDP	Dinnyés; MKP–FKGP–MSZDP–NPP	24 (1947)
—		Ernő Gerő (1898–1980) acting	10 December 1948	18 February 1949	MDP	Dinnyés; MKP–FKGP–MSZDP–NPP	24 (1947)
4		Ernő Gerő (1898–1980)	18 February 1949	11 June 1949	MDP	Dobi; MDP–FKGP–NPP	24 (1947)
4		Ernő Gerő (1898–1980)	18 February 1949	11 June 1949	MDP	Dobi; MDP–FKGP–NPP	25 (1949)
5		István Kossa (1904–1965)	11 June 1949	20 August 1949	MDP	Dobi; MDP–FKGP–NPP	25 (1949)

=== Hungarian People's Republic (1949–1989) ===
Parties MDP-MSZMP MSZP

No.	Portrait	Name (Birth–Death)	Term of office		Political party	Cabinet	Assembly (Election)
1		István Kossa (1904–1965); 1st term	20 August 1949	24 February 1950	MDP	Dobi; MDP	25 (1949)
2		Károly Olt (1904–1985)	24 February 1950	14 August 1952	MDP	Dobi; MDP	25 (1949)
2		Károly Olt (1904–1985)	14 August 1952	4 July 1953	MDP	Rákosi; MDP	25 (1949)
2		Károly Olt (1904–1985)	4 July 1953	18 April 1955	MDP	I. Nagy I MDP	26 (1953)
2		Károly Olt (1904–1985)	18 April 1955	24 October 1956	MDP	Hegedüs; MDP	26 (1953)
(1)		István Kossa (1904–1965); 2nd term	24 October 1956	3 November 1956	MDP	I. Nagy II; MDP/MSZMP–FKGP	26 (1953)
(1)		István Kossa (1904–1965); 2nd term	4 November 1956	9 May 1957	MSZMP	Kádár I MSZMP	26 (1953)
3		István Antos (1908–1960)	9 May 1957	28 January 1958	MSZMP	Kádár I MSZMP	26 (1953)
3		István Antos (1908–1960)	28 January 1958	5 January 1960 (died in office)	MSZMP	Münnich; MSZMP	26 (1953)
3		István Antos (1908–1960)	28 January 1958	5 January 1960 (died in office)	MSZMP	Münnich; MSZMP	26 (1953)
4		Rezső Nyers (1923–2018)	5 January 1960	13 September 1961	MSZMP	Münnich; MSZMP	26 (1953)
4		Rezső Nyers (1923–2018)	13 September 1961	27 November 1962	MSZMP	Münnich; MSZMP	26 (1953)
4		Rezső Nyers (1923–2018)	13 September 1961	27 November 1962	MSZMP	Kádár II; MSZMP	26 (1953)
5		Mátyás Tímár (1923–2020)	27 November 1962	30 June 1965	MSZMP	Kádár II; MSZMP	26 (1953)
5		Mátyás Tímár (1923–2020)	27 November 1962	30 June 1965	MSZMP	Kádár II; MSZMP	28 (1963)
5		Mátyás Tímár (1923–2020)	30 June 1965	14 April 1967	MSZMP	Kállai; MSZMP	28 (1963)
6		Péter Vályi (1919–1973)	14 April 1967	12 May 1971	MSZMP	Fock; MSZMP	29 (1967)
7		Lajos Faluvégi (1924–1999)	12 May 1971	15 May 1975	MSZMP	Fock; MSZMP	30 (1971)
7		Lajos Faluvégi (1924–1999)	15 May 1975	27 June 1980	MSZMP	Lázár; MSZMP	30 (1971)
7		Lajos Faluvégi (1924–1999)	15 May 1975	27 June 1980	MSZMP	Lázár; MSZMP	31 (1975)
8		István Hetényi (1926–2008)	27 June 1980	31 December 1986	MSZMP	Lázár; MSZMP	32 (1980)
8		István Hetényi (1926–2008)	27 June 1980	31 December 1986	MSZMP	Lázár; MSZMP	33 (1985)
9		Péter Medgyessy (1942–)	1 January 1987	25 June 1987	MSZMP	Lázár; MSZMP	33 (1985)
9		Péter Medgyessy (1942–)	25 June 1987	15 December 1987	MSZMP	Grósz; MSZMP	33 (1985)
10		Miklós Villányi (1931–)	15 December 1987	24 November 1988	MSZMP	Grósz; MSZMP	33 (1985)
10		Miklós Villányi (1931–)	24 November 1988	9 May 1989	MSZMP	Németh (MSZMP)→MSZP	33 (1985)
11		László Békesi (1942–)	10 May 1989	7 October 1989	MSZMP	Németh (MSZMP)→MSZP	33 (1985)
(11)		László Békesi (1942–)	7 October 1989	23 October 1989	MSZP	Németh (MSZMP)→MSZP	33 (1985)

=== Hungarian Republic (1989–2010) ===
Parties MSZP MDF Fidesz Independent

No.	Portrait	Name (Birth–Death)	Term of office		Political party	Cabinet	Assembly (Election)
—		László Békesi (1942–) provisional	23 October 1989	23 May 1990	MSZP	Németh; MSZP	—
1		Ferenc Rabár (1929–1999)	23 May 1990	19 December 1990	Independent	Antall; MDF–FKGP–KDNP	34 (1990)
2		Mihály Kupa (1941–2024)	20 December 1990	11 February 1993	MDF	Antall; MDF–FKGP–KDNP	34 (1990)
3		Iván Szabó (1934–2005)	24 February 1993	21 December 1993	MDF	Antall; MDF–FKGP–KDNP	34 (1990)
3		Iván Szabó (1934–2005)	21 December 1993	15 July 1994	MDF	Boross; MDF–EKGP–KDNP	34 (1990)
4		László Békesi (1942–)	15 July 1994	28 February 1995	MSZP	Horn; MSZP–SZDSZ	35 (1994)
5		Lajos Bokros (1954–)	1 March 1995	29 February 1996	Independent	Horn; MSZP–SZDSZ	35 (1994)
6		Péter Medgyessy (1942–)	1 March 1996	7 Jule 1998	Independent	Horn; MSZP–SZDSZ	35 (1994)
7		Zsigmond Járai (1951–)	8 Jule 1998	31 December 2000	Independent	Orbán I Fidesz–FKGP–MDF	36 (1998)
8		Mihály Varga (1965–); 1st term	1 January 2001	27 May 2002	Fidesz	Orbán I Fidesz–FKGP–MDF	36 (1998)
9		Csaba László (1962–)	27 May 2002	15 February 2004	Independent	Medgyessy; MSZP–SZDSZ	37 (2002)
10		Tibor Draskovics (1955–)	15 February 2004	4 October 2004	Independent	Medgyessy; MSZP–SZDSZ	37 (2002)
10		Tibor Draskovics (1955–)	4 October 2004	24 April 2005	Independent	Gyurcsány I MSZP–SZDSZ	37 (2002)
11		János Veres (1957–)	24 April 2005	9 June 2006	MSZP	Gyurcsány I MSZP–SZDSZ	37 (2002)
11		János Veres (1957–)	9 June 2006	16 April 2009	MSZP	Gyurcsány II; MSZP–SZDSZ	38 (2006)
12		Péter Oszkó (1973–)	16 April 2009	29 May 2010	Independent	Bajnai; MSZP	38 (2006)

== Ministers of National Economy (2010–2018) ==
=== Hungarian Republic / Hungary (2010–2018) ===
Parties Fidesz

No.	Portrait	Name (Birth–Death)	Term of office		Political party	Cabinet	Assembly (Election)
1		György Matolcsy (1955–)	29 May 2010	3 March 2013	Fidesz	Orbán II; Fidesz–KDNP	39 (2010)
2		Mihály Varga (1965–); 2nd term	3 March 2013	6 June 2014	Fidesz	Orbán II; Fidesz–KDNP	39 (2010)
2		Mihály Varga (1965–); 2nd term	6 June 2014	18 May 2018	Fidesz	Orbán III; Fidesz–KDNP	40 (2014)

== Ministers of Finance (2018–present) ==
=== Hungarian Republic / Hungary (2018–present) ===
Parties Fidesz TISZA

No.	Portrait	Name (Birth–Death)	Term of office		Political party	Cabinet	Assembly (Election)
1		Mihály Varga (1965–); 2nd term	18 May 2018	24 May 2022	Fidesz	Orbán IV; Fidesz–KDNP	41 (2018)
1		Mihály Varga (1965–); 2nd term	24 May 2022	31 December 2024	Fidesz	Orbán V Fidesz–KDNP	42 (2022)
2		Márton Nagy (1976–)	1 January 2025	12 May 2026	Fidesz	Orbán V Fidesz–KDNP	42 (2022)
3		András Kármán (1973–)	13 May 2026	Incumbent	TISZA	Magyar; TISZA	43 (2026)

== See also ==
- List of heads of state of Hungary
- List of prime ministers of Hungary
- Politics of Hungary

Cabinet ministers

- Minister of Agriculture (Hungary)
- Minister of Civilian Intelligence Services (Hungary)
- Minister of Croatian Affairs of Hungary
- Minister of Defence (Hungary)
- Minister of Education (Hungary)
- Minister of Foreign Affairs (Hungary)
- Minister of the Interior (Hungary)
- Minister of Justice (Hungary)
- Minister of Public Works and Transport (Hungary)
