= Menyhért Lónyay =

Hungarian politician

Count Menyhért Lónyay de Nagylónya et Vásárosnamény
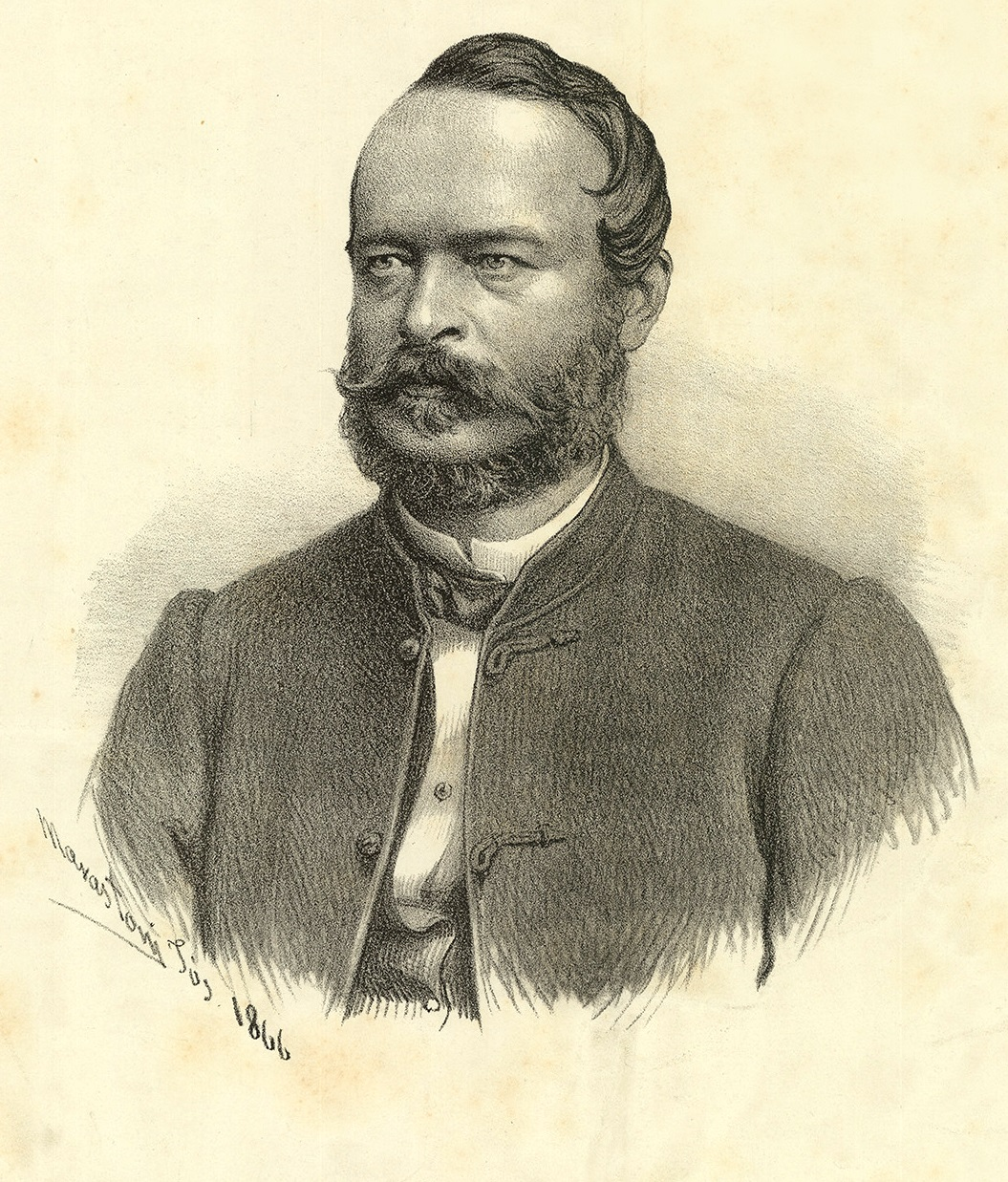

Prime Minister of the Kingdom of Hungary
- In office 14 November 1871 – 4 December 1872
- Monarch: Francis Joseph I
- Preceded by: Gyula Andrássy
- Succeeded by: József Szlávy

Personal details
- Born: 6 January 1822 Nagylónya, Kingdom of Hungary, Austrian Empire
- Died: 3 November 1884 (aged 62) Budapest, Austria-Hungary
- Party: Opposition Party (1847–1849); Deák Party (1865–1875); Liberal Party (1875–1884)
- Spouse: Emília Lónyay de Nagylónya et Vásárosnamény (née Kappel)
- Children: Béla; Menyhért; Gábor; János

Menyhért Count Lónyay de Nagylónya et Vásárosnamény (6 January 1822, in Nagylónya – 3 November 1884, in Budapest) was a Hungarian politician who served as Prime Minister of Hungary from 1871 to 1872.

== Early life and ancestry ==
He was born to an old Protestant Hungarian aristocratic family, dating back to 13th century, as the elder of two sons of János, Baron Lónyay de Nagylónya et Vásárosnamény (1796-1859) and his wife and cousin, Florentina, Baroness Lónyay de Nagy-Lónya et Vásárosnamény (1802-1885). His first cousin once removed was Count Elemér Lónyay de Nagylónya et Vásárosnamény (1863-1946), second husband of Crown Princess Stéphanie of Austria, who converted to Catholicism upon his marriage and was elevated into the rank of Fürst on 9 February 1917 by Charles I of Austria.

== Biography ==
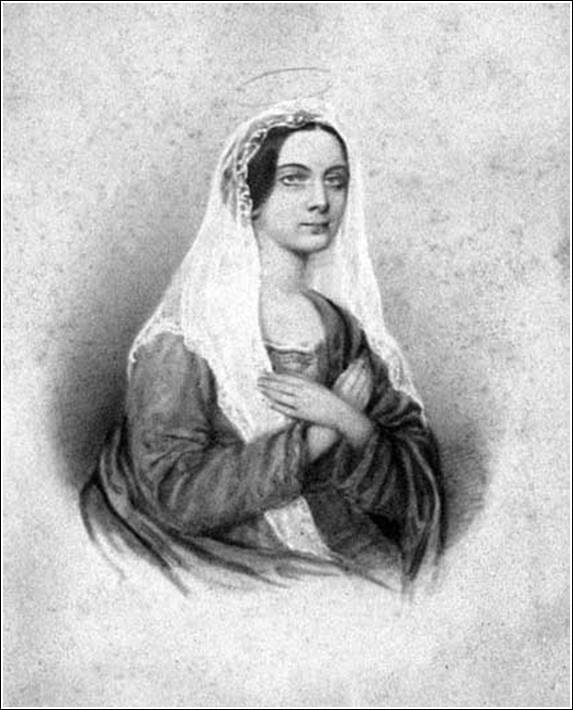
Wife of Count Menyhért Count Lónyay de Nygylónya et Vásárosnamény: Countess Emilia Lónyay de Nygylónya et Vásárosnamény née Kappel (1825-1888), the daughter of Frigyes Kappel (1773-1855)

He pursued his legal studies in Pest and became a member of the Hungarian Diet in 1843, where he aligned with the opposition, although he also criticized the protectionist tariff system advocated by Lajos Kossuth.

He served as undersecretary of state in the government established following the Hungarian Revolution of 1848, but fled when the uprising was suppressed in 1849. He returned to Hungary in 1850 after being granted amnesty. Upon his return, he advocated for construction projects aimed at improving navigation and flood control along the Tisza river and played an active role in initiating developments in the agricultural and financial sectors. He voiced his support for the autonomy of Protestant churches after the Patent of 1859 posed a threat to their existence.

In 1867, he was appointed Minister of Finance under the first constitutional Prime Minister, Gyula Andrássy, and in 1870, he took on the role of Minister of Finance for Austria-Hungary. In August 1871, he was elevated to the title of Count, and in November 1871, he ascended to the position of Prime Minister of Hungary. However, he resigned relatively soon after, amid allegations of corruption: he was directly accused by a member of the Diet on 18 November 1872 and was dismissed on 2 December of that year. He became a member of the upper chamber of the Diet in 1875 and died in 1884.

== Private life ==
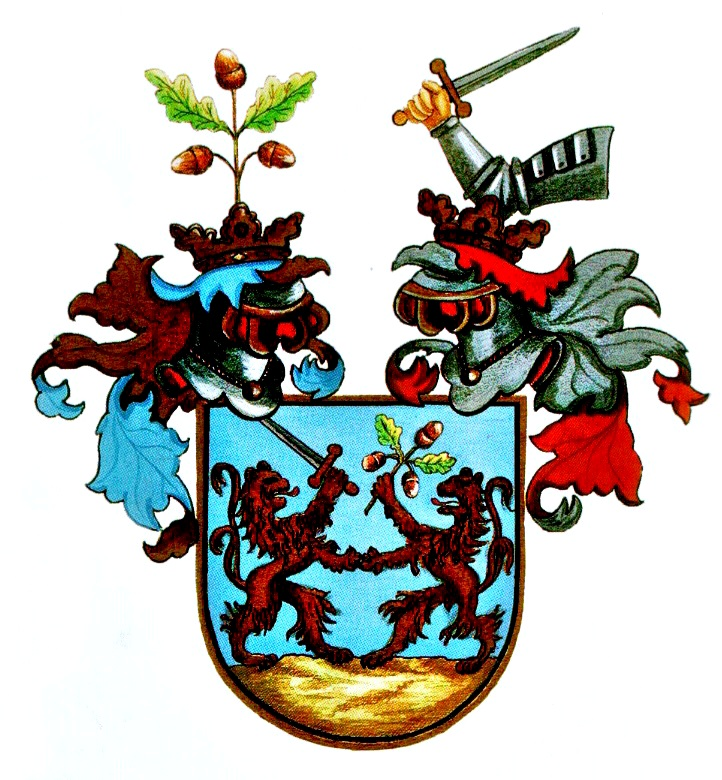
Coat of Arms of the Lónyay de Nagylónya et Vásárosnamény family in 1860

Count Menyhért Lónyay de Nagylónya et Vásárosnamény was married in Pest, Hungary on 20 September 1845 to Emília Kappel (1825-1888), the daughter of Frigyes Kappel (1773-1855). They had four sons:

- Count Béla Lónyay de Nagylónya et Vásárosnamény (1890-1869), married his cousin Baroness Mária Lónyay de Nagylónya et Vásárosnamény (1849-1893) and had issue:
  - Countess Margit Lónyay de Nagylónya et Vásárosnamény (1870-1931), married Árpád Vásárhelyi de Kézdivásárhely (1877-1955)
  - Count Menyhért Lónyay de Nagylónya et Vásárosnamény (1873-1937), married Ilona Kendeffy de Malomvíz (1873-1958), had issue
- Count Menyhért Lónyay de Nagylónya et Vásárosnamény (1849-1884), married Countess Margit Forgách de Ghymes et Gács (1851-1933) and had one daughter:
  - Countess Pálma Eleonora Lónyay de Nagylónya et Vásárosnamény (1880-1967), married to Prince Eugen Zoárd Odescalchi (1876-1917)
- Count Gábor Lónyay de Nagylónya et Vásárosnamény (1851-1927), never married
- Count János Lónyay de Nagylónya et Vásárosnamény (1860-1937), never married

== Ancestors ==
Menyhért Lónyay de Nagylónya et Vásárosnamény's ancestors in three generations
Menyhért Lónyay de Nagylónya et Vásárosnamény	Father: János Lónyay de Nagylónya et Vásárosnamény	Paternal Grandfather: Menyhért Lónyay de Nagylónya et Vásárosnamény	Paternal Great-grandfather: Baron László Lónyay de Nagylónya et Vásárosnamény
Menyhért Lónyay de Nagylónya et Vásárosnamény	Father: János Lónyay de Nagylónya et Vásárosnamény	Paternal Grandfather: Menyhért Lónyay de Nagylónya et Vásárosnamény	Paternal Great-grandmother: Zsófia Darvas de Nagy-Réth
Menyhért Lónyay de Nagylónya et Vásárosnamény	Father: János Lónyay de Nagylónya et Vásárosnamény	Paternal Grandmother: Erzsébet Szemere de Szemere	Paternal Great-grandfather: László Szemere de Szemere
Menyhért Lónyay de Nagylónya et Vásárosnamény	Father: János Lónyay de Nagylónya et Vásárosnamény	Paternal Grandmother: Erzsébet Szemere de Szemere	Paternal Great-grandmother: Klára Szentpétery de Erzsébetváros
Menyhért Lónyay de Nagylónya et Vásárosnamény	Mother: Florentina Lónyay de Nagylónya et Vásárosnamény	Maternal Grandfather: Gábor Lónyay de Nagylónya et Vásárosnamény	Maternal Great-grandfather: János Lónyay de Nagylónya et Vásárosnamény
Menyhért Lónyay de Nagylónya et Vásárosnamény	Mother: Florentina Lónyay de Nagylónya et Vásárosnamény	Maternal Grandfather: Gábor Lónyay de Nagylónya et Vásárosnamény	Maternal Great-grandmother: Florentina Lónyay de Nagylónya et Vásárosnamény
Menyhért Lónyay de Nagylónya et Vásárosnamény	Mother: Florentina Lónyay de Nagylónya et Vásárosnamény	Maternal Grandmother: Piroska Prónay de Tóthpróna et Blathnicza	Maternal Great-grandfather: László Prónay de Tóthpróna et Blathnicza
Menyhért Lónyay de Nagylónya et Vásárosnamény	Mother: Florentina Lónyay de Nagylónya et Vásárosnamény	Maternal Grandmother: Piroska Prónay de Tóthpróna et Blathnicza	Maternal Great-grandmother: Rozália Radvánszky de Radvány et Sajókaza

Political offices
Preceded by Ferenc Duschek	Minister of Finance; 1867–1870	Succeeded by Károly Kerkapoly
Preceded by Friedrich Ferdinand von Beust	Joint Minister of Finance of Austria-Hungary; 1870–1871	Succeeded by Gyula Andrássy
Preceded by Gyula Andrássy	Prime Minister of Hungary; 1871–1872	Succeeded by József Szlávy
Preceded by Gyula Andrássy	Minister of Defence; 1871–1872	Succeeded by József Szlávy
Cultural offices
Preceded by József Eötvös	President of the Hungarian Academy of Sciences; 1871–1884	Succeeded by Ágoston Trefort
