= Lónya =

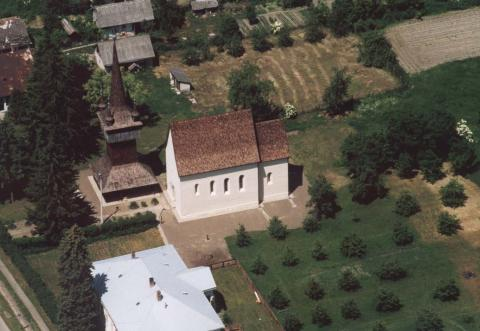
- Aerial photography of the bell tower

- Coat of arms

- Location of Lónya
- Coordinates: 48.323169°N 22.274568°E
- Country: Hungary
- County: Szabolcs-Szatmár-Bereg

Area
  - Total: 36.49 km^{2} (14.09 sq mi)

Population (2008)
  - Total: 825
  - Density: 23.43/km^{2} (60.7/sq mi)
- Time zone: UTC+1 (CET)
  - Summer (DST): UTC+2 (CEST)
- Postal code: 4836
- Area code: 45

Lónya is a village in the County of Szabolcs-Szatmár-Bereg, Hungary. It is located close to the village of Batiovo in neighboring Ukraine.

== History ==
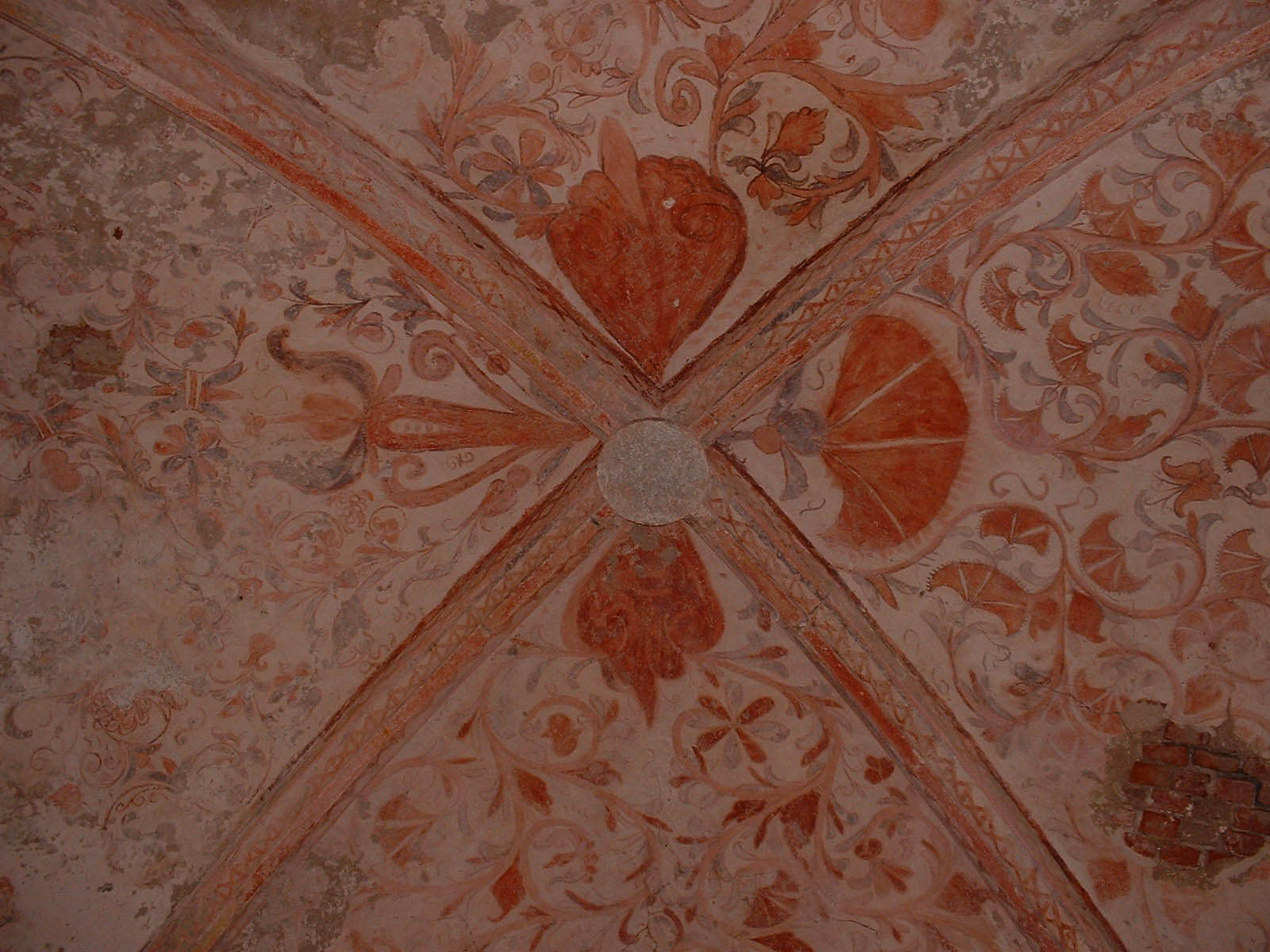
The wall paintings in the reformed church

On the basis of historical research the village existed already when the Magyars settled in Hungary in the 10th century. First time the name of "Luna" had been mentioned in a noble benefaction letter in 1270. In the 13th century the village had been possessed by palatine Bánk Bár-Kalán. After he had assassinated Queen Gertud, his tenure had been seized by King Endre II. The King endowed the village to the Berenczeis in 1285. The descendants of the Berenczeis had used the family name ”Lónyay” after this donation. In this time the village divided into two parts: Kislónya (Small-Lónya) and Nagylónya (Great-Lonya). The Romanesque church was built in the 13th century. In the year of 1567 the Mongolians had been burglarized the village. The Lónyays confess to the Reformed Church (Calvinist) in the early time, in the middle of the 16th. Kis and Nagylónya were united as Lónya in 1934. The village used to lie closer to the river, but the inhabitants had to move further up, to the current position, because of frequent floods. Although the village was rebuilt, there are still a few special barns left. Today, most of the 900 inhabitants live by the main street and produce mainly wheat, corn, sunflower seeds, apples and plums.

== Sights ==
Romanesque church (13th century)

Wooden bell-tower (18th century)

Lónyay's Crypt (end of the 19th century)

Park of the former Lónyay Castle A 6.3-hectare (16-acre) castle park surrounded the Lónyay castle, and although the castle was destroyed in a fire in 1965, the walk in the famous and unique horse chestnut tree rows still exist. There are also five pyramid oaks, each about 26 metres high and 120 years old, as well as some maple trees which also must be about 100 years old. The richness of nature is also proved by a healthy elm tree in the Long-pasture, which is 25 metres high, and 3 metres in circumference.

Forest of Lónya

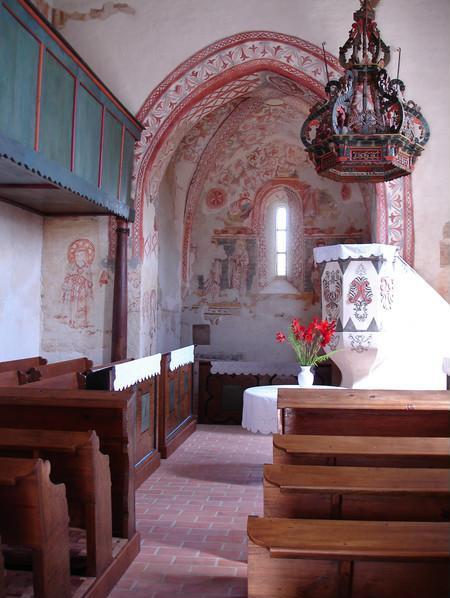
The inner of the church

The Lónya forest is part of the Szatmár-Bereg Nature Reservation District. The forest by the border is scattered with beautiful hornbeam and oak trees, as well as ash and elm trees. On the southern edge is the so-called Mélyéger alder moor. In the north it is bordered by the country border and the Csaronda stream. The older species of the oak, ash, and elm trees in the 407-hectare (1,010-acre) grove are about 70–80 years old, but even the younger ones are older than 50 years. The grove is so isolated that red deer are only found here in the Bereg forests; there are about 50 of them, and some have capital antlers. Wild boars and roes, as well as black storks and wild cats can often be seen here. There are also vipers living here, so it is recommended to wear rubber boots when walking in the forest. Outside Lónya a hunting lodge is waiting for the hunters.

== Notable people ==
- Menyhért Lónyay, Former prime minister of Hungary
- Jolan Babus, Ethnographer-teacher
