= Miklós Nyárádi =

Hungarian politician

Minister of Finance of Hungary
- In office 14 March 1947 – 3 December 1948
- Prime Minister: Ferenc Nagy; Lajos Dinnyés
- Preceded by: Jenő Rácz
- Succeeded by: Ernő Gerő

Personal details
- Born: Miklós Scheidl; 21 May 1905 Budapest, Austria-Hungary
- Died: 12 May 1976 (aged 70) Vienna, Austria
- Party: FKGP
- Profession: Politician, lawyer

Miklós Nyárádi (born Miklós Scheidl; 21 May 1905 – 12 May 1976) was a Hungarian politician who served as Minister of Finance between 1947 and 1948.

== Biography ==
Nyárádi graduated with a doctorate in law from the University of Budapest in 1928, and was employed at the First National Savings Bank of Pest from 1933 to 1946. He joined the Independent Smallholders, Agrarian Workers and Civic Party after 1945, and headed the party's financial committee. Nyárádi served as Secretary of State in the Ministry of Finance from 6 April 1946, until he was appointed Minister of Finance on 14 March 1947.

In November 1948 Nyárádi defected during an official visit to Switzerland, and subsequently announced his resignation as Minister of Finance in a letter on 3 December; Nyárádi's defection led to the downfall of Prime Minister Lajos Dinnyés's government a few days later, on 10 December. Nyárádi settled down in the United States around 1949 and was appointed a Professor of Economics at Bradley University in Peoria, Illinois in 1951, heading the School of International Studies there from 1957. Between 1969 and 1974 he worked as an advisor to the U.S. Department of State. He returned to Europe in 1976, settling in Milan.

Political offices
Preceded by Jenő Rácz	Minister of Finance; 1947–1948	Succeeded by Ernő Gerő
