= Lóránt Hegedüs =

Hungarian politician

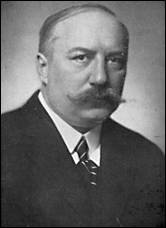

Minister of Finance of Hungary
- In office 16 December 1920 – 27 September 1921
- Preceded by: Frigyes Korányi
- Succeeded by: Lajos Hegyeshalmi

Personal details
- Born: 28 June 1872; Pest, Austria-Hungary
- Died: 1 January 1943 (aged 70); Budapest, Kingdom of Hungary
- Political party: Party of National Work
- Profession: politician, economist

Lóránt Hegedüs (28 June 1872 – 1 January 1943) was a Hungarian politician, who served as Minister of Finance between 1920 and 1921. He finished his studies in Berlin and London. After that he started his career in the Ministry of Finance, then he worked in the United States when he researched the emigration cases. Hegedüs served as chairman of the Hungarian Trade Bank. Pál Teleki appointed him Minister of Finance, Hegedüs kept his position in the István Bethlen cabinet. From 1920 he was member of the Hungarian Academy of Sciences and the Kisfaludy Society. He took a part in the literary fights of his age, opposite the conservative forces' attacks he protected Endre Ady. Hegedüs had works dealing with economic, taxation and emigration questions reported.

Political offices
| Preceded by Frigyes Korányi | Minister of Finance; 1920–1921 | Succeeded by Lajos Hegyeshalmi |
