= Lajos Hegyeshalmi =

Hungarian politician

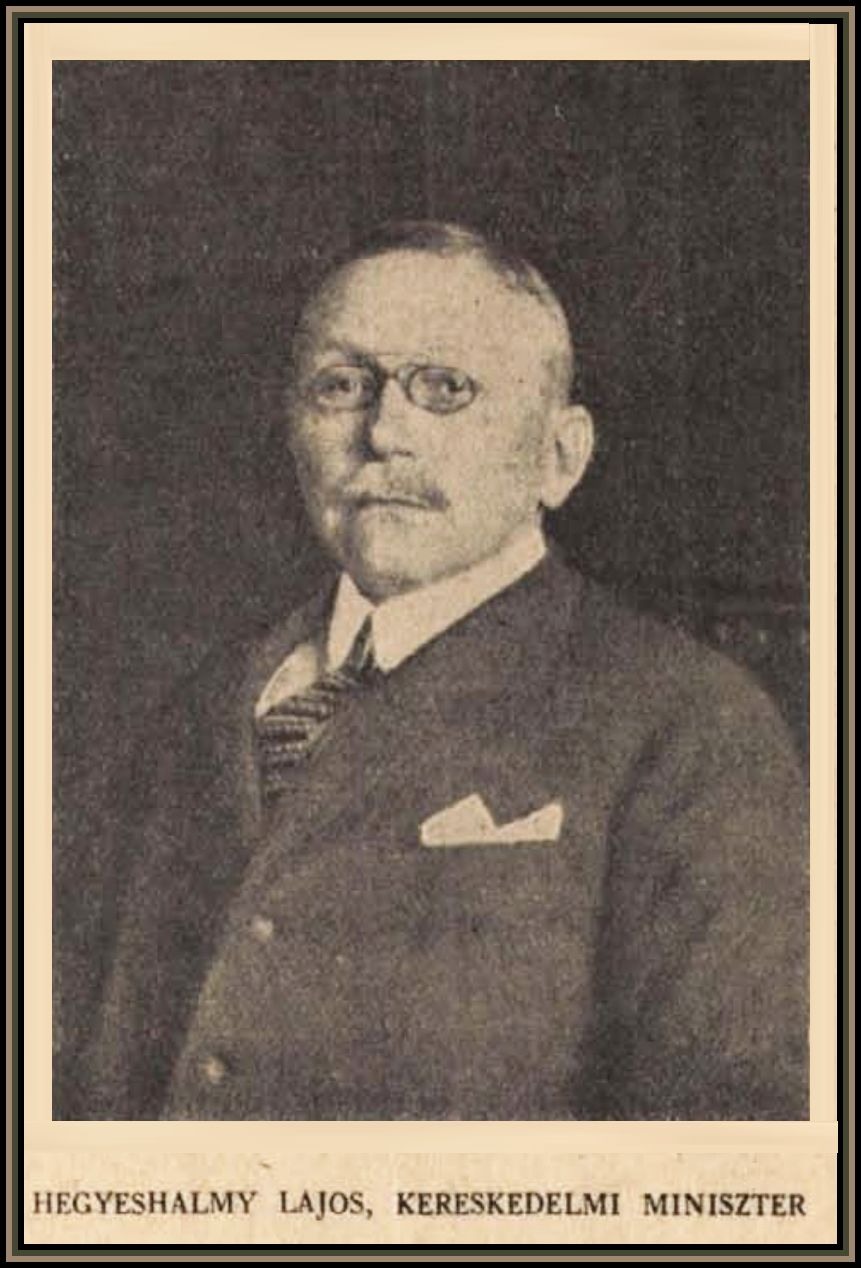

Minister of Finance of Hungary
- In office 27 September 1921 – 4 October 1921
- Preceded by: Lóránt Hegedüs
- Succeeded by: István Bethlen

Personal details
- Born: 21 October 1862; Pest, Kingdom of Hungary
- Died: 7 March 1925 (aged 62); Budapest, Kingdom of Hungary
- Political party: KNEP
- Profession: politician, economist

Lajos Hegyeshalmi or Hegyeshalmy (21 October 1862 – 7 March 1925) was a Hungarian politician, who served as acting Minister of Finance in 1921. After his graduating he was appointed head secretary of the Hungarian National Bank, later he worked for the National Statistical Office. Between 1910 and 1914 he was the deputy chairman of the Hungarian State Railways. He served as Minister of Trade twice: in 1919 and between 1920 and 1922. Hegyeshalmi was member of the Diet of Hungary.

Political offices
Preceded by Lóránt Hegedüs	Minister of Finance; Acting; 1921	Succeeded by István Bethlen
