= Tihamér Fabinyi =

Hungarian politician

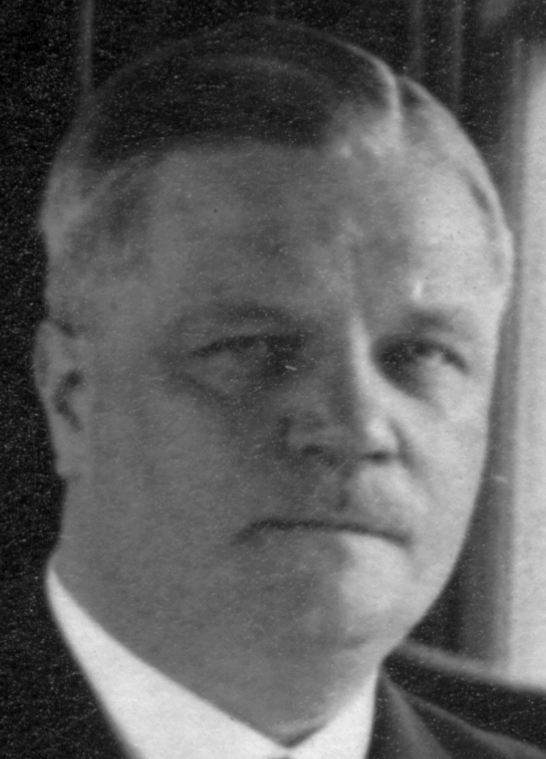

Minister of Finance of Hungary
- In office 6 January 1935 – 9 March 1938
- Prime Minister: Gyula Gömbös; Kálmán Darányi
- Preceded by: Béla Imrédy
- Succeeded by: Lajos Reményi-Schneller

Personal details
- Born: August 7, 1890 Hisnyóvíz, Austria-Hungary
- Died: 11 June 1953 (aged 62) Boston, United States
- Party: Party of National Unity
- Profession: politician, economist, lawyer

Tihamér Fabinyi (7 August 1890 – 11 June 1953) was a Hungarian politician who served as Minister of Finance between 1935 and 1938. He studied in Berlin, Leipzig, Cambridge, and in Budapest. He served as director of law of the Ganz Danubius Joint Stock Company, then he later worked as a lawyer. He was member of the House of Representatives between 1931 and 1936. In 1932, Gyula Gömbös appointed him Minister of Trade. He collaborated in the development of the Hungarian-Italian commercial contacts, Danube seafaring, tourism, and the resort area of Lake Balaton.

After the "Programme of Győr", he was succeeded by Lajos Reményi-Schneller. Fabinyi was the head of the General Credit Bank of Hungary from 1938 until 1944. After the occupation of Hungary, he emigrated to Switzerland, then the United States.

== See also ==
- Hungarian General Credit Bank

Political offices
Preceded by Béla Imrédy	Minister of Finance; 1935–1938	Succeeded by Lajos Reményi-Schneller
