= Jolán Babus =

Jolán Babus (17 October 1917 – 5 May 1967) was a Hungarian ethnographer and teacher.

== Life ==
Jolán Babus was born in Košice, which is now part of Slovakia, on 17 October 1917. Following the Treaty of Trianon in 1920, her family moved to Lónya, where her father was a Calvinist priest.

From 1936, Babus attended the Teacher College of Debrecen, where she taught Faculty of Arts. In 1943, she became a member of the National Museum of Ethnography. In 1952, she founded the grammar school and the dormitory in Vásárosnamény. She was the founder of the Museum Bereg. Last year she worked in Szekszárd, in the Museum Sárrét.

Babus died there, but she was buried in Lónya.

== Works ==
- Kender- és lenmunkák a beregmegyei Lónyán (Népr. Közl., 1957)
- Nádvágás és tetőfedés a Bereg megyei Lónyán
- A lónyai vizek néprajza (Népr. Közl., 1959).
- Adalékok a lónyai aratáshoz
- Adatok a vásárosnaményi és gergelyiugornyai halászathoz
- Tiszaháti falucsúfolók. 1955.
- Néprajzi tanulmányok a beregi Tiszahátról
- Közmondások és szólások a Bereg megyei Lónyáról
