= István Kossa =

Hungarian politician (1904–1965)

Minister of Finance of Hungary
- In office 11 June 1949 – 24 February 1950
- Prime Minister: István Dobi
- Preceded by: Ernő Gerő
- Succeeded by: Károly Olt
- In office 24 October 1956 – 9 May 1957
- Prime Minister: Imre Nagy; János Kádár
- Preceded by: Károly Olt
- Succeeded by: István Antos

Personal details
- Born: March 31, 1904 Balatonlelle, Austria-Hungary
- Died: 9 April 1965 (aged 61) Budapest, People's Republic of Hungary
- Party: MDP, MSZMP
- Profession: politician, economist

István Kossa (31 March 1904 – 9 April 1965) was a Hungarian politician, who served as Minister of Finance twice: between 1949–1950 and between 1956 and 1957. After the secondary grammar school's accomplishment he worked in Budapest as a tram conductor. He joined the Social Democratic Party in 1923. He took a part in the trade union opposition's fights actively as member of the left-wing Tram Alliance. He was elected to the position of the general secretary of the alliance in 1933. In this same year he was arrested along with other members of the leadership. Kossa was taken to the Eastern Front in 1942, where he and many other prisoners joined the Soviet troops.

In November 1944 he returned to home to make a connection with the Hungarian Communist Party and the Hungarian front. After the war Kossa led many offices (for example Council of the Trade Union). From 1945 he worked as a member of the Hungarian Working People's Party's Central Leadership and the National Assembly of Hungary. Kossa was appointed Minister of Industry on 5 August 1948, later served as Minister of Finance until 24 February 1950. From 5 January 1952 to 2 July 1953 he was the Minister of Metallurgical and Machine Industry. In 1955 he worked for the National Planning Board as first deputy chairman. From 24 October 1956 he served as Minister of Finance again. Until his retirement (1963) he was the Minister of Transport and Post. He was also member of the Hungarian Socialist Workers' Party's Central Committee until his death.

Political offices
Preceded by Ernő Gerő	Minister of Finance; 1949–1950	Succeeded by Károly Olt
Preceded by Károly Olt	Minister of Finance; 1956–1957	Succeeded by István Antos
