= István Vásáry =

Hungarian politician

Minister of Finance of Hungary
- In office 22 December 1944 (officially 28 March 1945) – 21 July 1945
- Prime Minister: Béla Miklós
- Preceded by: Lajos Reményi-Schneller
- Succeeded by: Imre Oltványi

Personal details
- Born: 29 January 1887 Debrecen, Austria-Hungary
- Died: 25 August 1955 (aged 68) Debrecen, People's Republic of Hungary
- Party: FKGP
- Profession: politician, economist

István Vásáry (29 January 1887 – 25 August 1955) was a Hungarian politician, who served as Minister of Finance between 1944 and 1945 in the Interim National Government. He studied law in his birthplace. He was the mayor of Debrecen between 1928 and 1935. He became representative as member of the Smallholders Party in 1939. After 1945, he led the party's right-wing side. On 12 March 1946, he was excluded from the party due to the pressure of the Hungarian Communist Party. Vásáry retired from the politics in 1947.

Political offices
| Preceded by György Magoss | Mayor of Debrecen; 1928–1935 | Succeeded by Sándor Kölcsey |
| Preceded by Jenő Rátz; House of Magnates | Speaker of the Provisional National Assembly; Acting; 1944 | Succeeded by Béla Zsedényi |
| Preceded by András Tasnádi Nagy; House of Representatives | Speaker of the Provisional National Assembly; Acting; 1944 | Succeeded by Béla Zsedényi |
| Preceded by Lajos Reményi-Schneller | Minister of Finance; 1944–1945 | Succeeded by Imre Oltványi |
