= Imre Oltványi =

Hungarian politician

Minister of Finance of Hungary
- In office 21 Jule 1945 – 15 November 1945
- Prime Minister: Béla Miklós
- Preceded by: István Vásáry
- Succeeded by: Ferenc Gordon

Personal details
- Born: February 20, 1893 Bácsalmás, Austria-Hungary
- Died: 13 January 1963 (aged 69) Budapest, People's Republic of Hungary
- Party: FKGP
- Profession: politician, economist

Imre Oltványi (20 February 1893 – 13 January 1963) was a Hungarian politician, who served as Minister of Finance in 1945 in the Interim National Government. He studied at the University of Budapest. Between 1920 and 1921 he was the secretary of the National Agriculture Association. He was a founding member of the Smallholders' Party. Towards the end of the Second World War he participated in resistant movements against the Arrow Cross Party government.

After the war he was appointed head of the National Bank of Hungary. After his short ministership he served in this position again. Oltványi was member of the National Assembly between 1945 and 1947. He served as ambassador to Switzerland between 1947 and 1948. After that he was the director of the Hungarian National Museum until 1950 and of the Museum of Fine Arts until 1952.

Political offices
Preceded by István Vásáry	Minister of Finance; 1945	Succeeded by Ferenc Gordon
