= Radovesnice I =

- Municipality
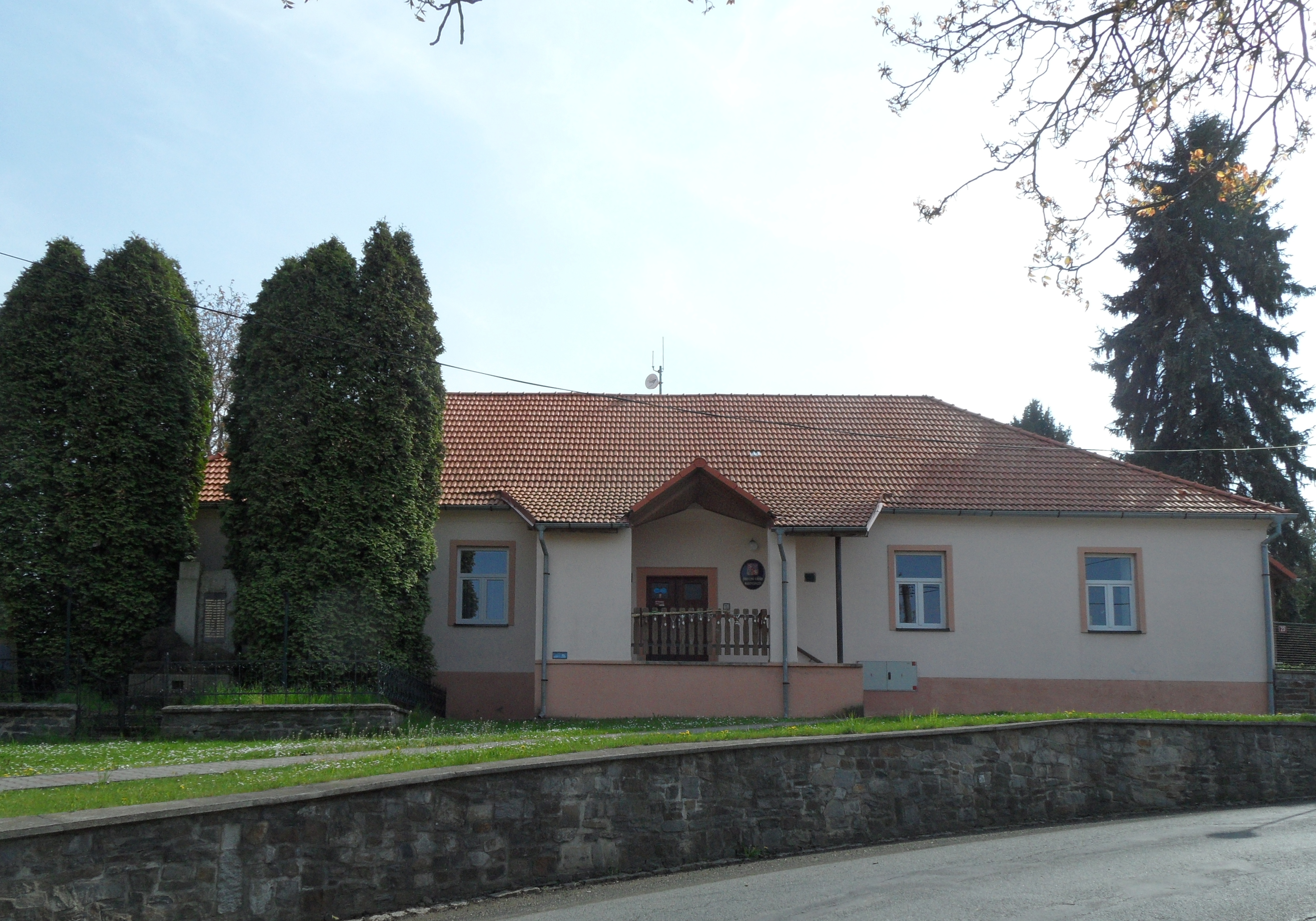
- Municipal office

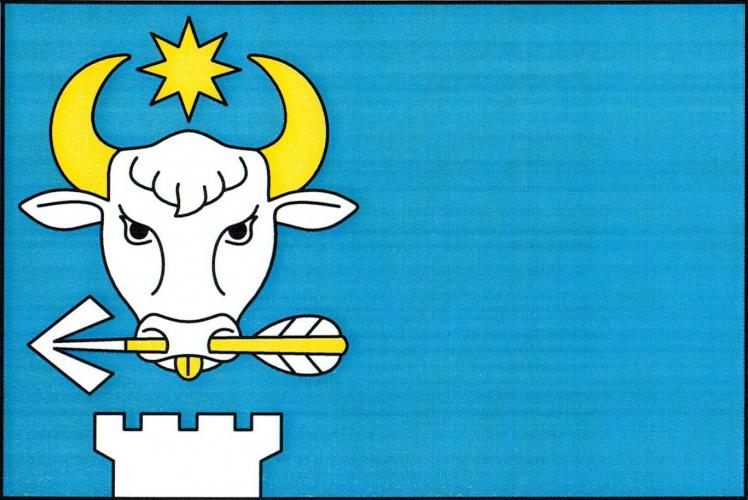
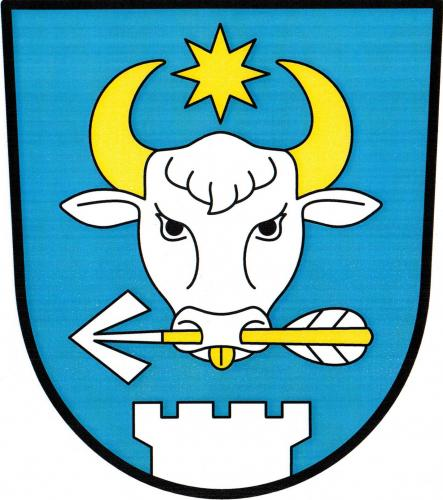
- Flag Coat of arms

- Location in the Czech Republic
- Coordinates: 50°0′38″N 15°9′3″E
- Country: Czech Republic
- Region: Central Bohemian
- District: Kolín
- First mentioned: 1266

Area
  - Total: 3.01 km^{2} (1.16 sq mi)
- Elevation: 264 m (866 ft)

Population (2026-01-01)
  - Total: 383
  - Density: 127/km^{2} (330/sq mi)
- Time zone: UTC+1 (CET)
  - Summer (DST): UTC+2 (CEST)
- Postal code: 280 02
- Website: www.radovesnice.cz

Radovesnice I is a municipality and village in Kolín District in the Central Bohemian Region of the Czech Republic. It has about 400 inhabitants.

The Roman numeral in the name serves to distinguish it from the nearby municipality of the same name, Radovesnice II.

== Demographics ==
Historical population
Year	Pop.	±%
1869	342	—
1880	438	+28.1%
1890	436	−0.5%
1900	436	+0.0%
1910	383	−12.2%
1921	427	+11.5%
1930	467	+9.4%
1950	430	−7.9%
1961	429	−0.2%
1970	352	−17.9%
1980	319	−9.4%
1991	272	−14.7%
2001	332	+22.1%
2011	345	+3.9%
2021	393	+13.9%
Source: Censuses
