= Jenő Rácz (Minister of Finance) =

Hungarian politician

Minister of Finance of Hungary
- In office 26 August 1946 – 14 March 1947
- Prime Minister: Ferenc Nagy
- Preceded by: Ferenc Gordon
- Succeeded by: Miklós Nyárádi

Personal details
- Born: 1907
- Died: 1981 (aged 73–74)
- Party: FKGP
- Profession: politician, economist

Jenő Rácz (26 May 1907 – 26 January 1981) was a Hungarian politician who served as Minister of Finance between 1946 and 1947. He was a member of the Independent Smallholders' Party.

Political offices
Preceded by Ferenc Gordon	Minister of Finance; 1946–1947	Succeeded by Miklós Nyárádi
