= Ferenc Gordon =

Hungarian politician (1893–1971)

Minister of Finance of Hungary
- In office 15 November 1945 – 26 August 1946
- Prime Minister: Zoltán Tildy; Mátyás Rákosi; Ferenc Nagy
- Preceded by: Imre Oltványi
- Succeeded by: Jenő Rácz

Personal details
- Born: 12 February 1893 Budapest, Austria-Hungary
- Died: 18 August 1971 (aged 78) Buenos Aires, Argentina
- Party: FKGP
- Profession: politician, economist

Ferenc Gordon (12 February 1893 – 18 August 1971) was a Hungarian politician, who served as Minister of Finance between 1945 and 1946. He studied at the Academy of Trade. He usually published articles about the economic matters in the 1920s and 1930s. He was a member of the Independent Smallholders, Agrarian Workers and Civic Party (FKGP) since 1934. Gordon had good relations with the Hungarian Social Democratic Party, and supported the alliance between the two parties in 1943. He led the economic department of the FKGP from 1945. In this same year he became a member of the National Assembly. After his ministership he served as ambassador to Switzerland between 1946 and 1947. After his resignation he stayed in Bern. Later he moved to Argentina, where he worked for the Siemens as an economic advisor.

Political offices
Preceded by Imre Oltványi	Minister of Finance; 1945–1946	Succeeded by Jenő Rácz
