= László Békesi =

Hungarian politician (born 1942)

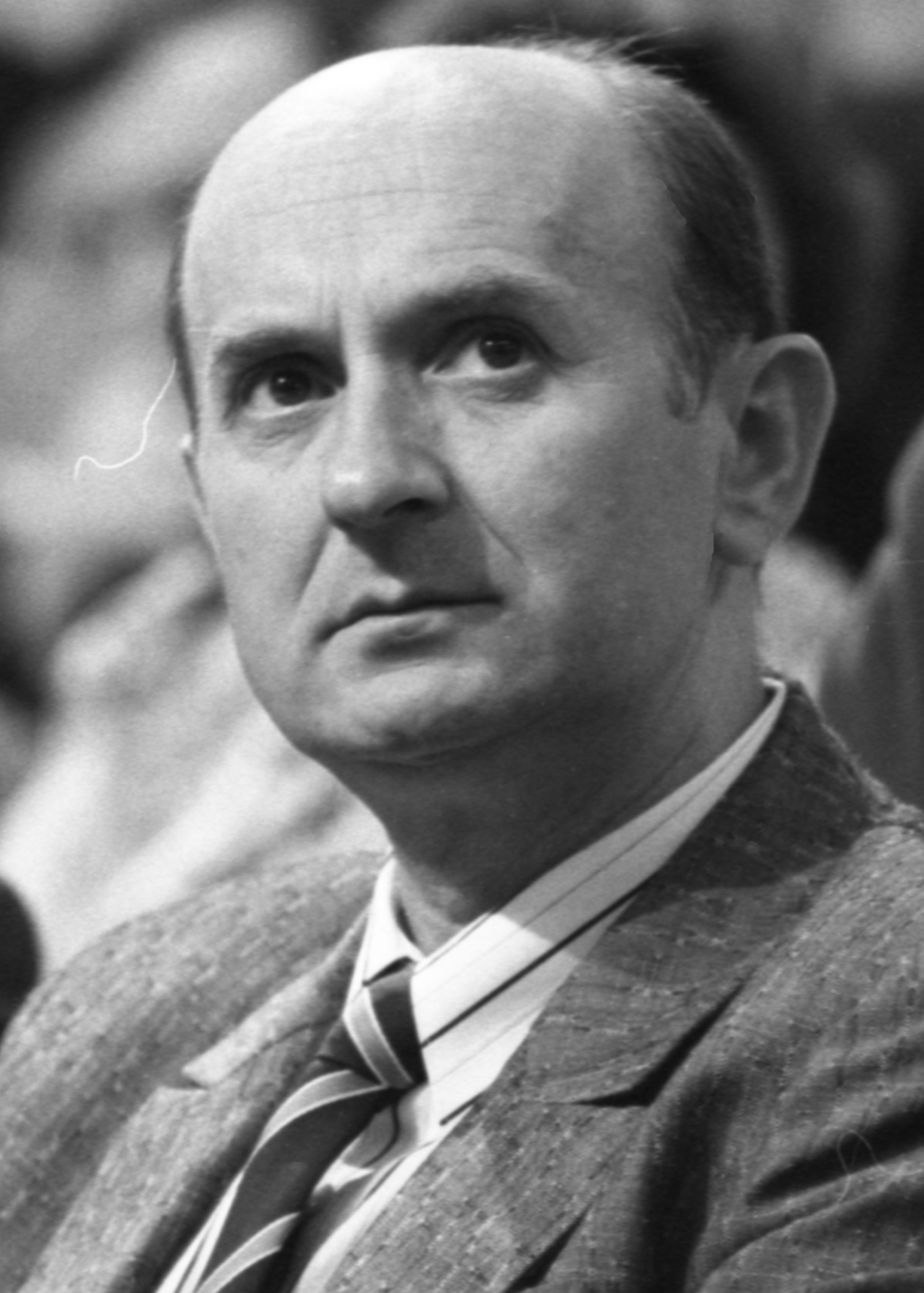

Minister of Finance of Hungary
- In office 10 May 1989 – 23 May 1990
- Prime Minister: Miklós Németh
- Preceded by: Miklós Villányi
- Succeeded by: Ferenc Rabár
- In office 15 July 1994 – 28 February 1995
- Prime Minister: Gyula Horn
- Preceded by: Iván Szabó
- Succeeded by: Lajos Bokros

Personal details
- Born: 31 May 1942 (age 84) Győr, Kingdom of Hungary
- Party: MSZMP, MSZP
- Spouse: Judit Csehák
- Children: Anikó
- Profession: politician, economist

László Békesi (born 31 May 1942) is a Hungarian politician, who served as Minister of Finance twice: between 1989-1990 and from 1994 to 1995.

== Biography ==
=== Early life ===
He was an athlete when he was ten years old, he was member of the national youth team. He finished high-school studies in Cegléd. He could have got into the university without admission one, because he was honored on the OKTV educational competition. However the Eötvös Loránd University did not admit him. According to the institution Békesi's material conditions were not provided for his learning, because his father died early. However the real reason was that he derived from a religious family. Békesi became a breadwinner, he worked for parish councils of Albertirsa and Dánszentmiklós. Later he was put it on for the College of Finance and Accountancy's evening course later. His teacher was Lajos Faluvégi, who later became Minister of Finance and dealt with the economical reform.

From 1967 he worked as a chief accountant for the Council of Pest County in Budapest. He joined to the MSZMP in 1968 and he was appointed head of the financial department and later general deputy chairman of the Council of Pest County. He became economical vice president of the Capital Council of Budapest in 1975 and member of the Committee of Planning Board.

Békesi graduated at the Karl Marx University of Economic Sciences. His speciality is the councils' farming from the collegiate years, later this was supplemented by the public finance and the questions of the fiscal systems.

=== First ministerial term ===
His political and vocational career rose in parallel. He was appointed titular university professor in 1981, during that time also served as economic-political secretary of the party's Committee of Budapest. Until 1985 he was member of the Central Committee's economic panel. In 1984 he was also member of the Hungarian Olympic Committee, which decided about the boycott of the 1984 Summer Olympics (Los Angeles) at this time. The committee voted for the boycotting beside three abstentions and one "not" vote. Békesi was one of the three who abstained, and lost his secretary position in 1985 in a party disciplinary action. However István Hetényi supported him and made him his substitute. László Békesi was the Communist regime's last Minister of Finance between 10 May 1989 and 23 May 1990.

Political offices
Preceded by Miklós Villányi	Minister of Finance; 1989–1990	Succeeded by Ferenc Rabár
Preceded by Iván Szabó	Minister of Finance; 1994–1995	Succeeded by Lajos Bokros
