= Péter Medgyessy =

Prime Minister of Hungary from 2002 to 2004

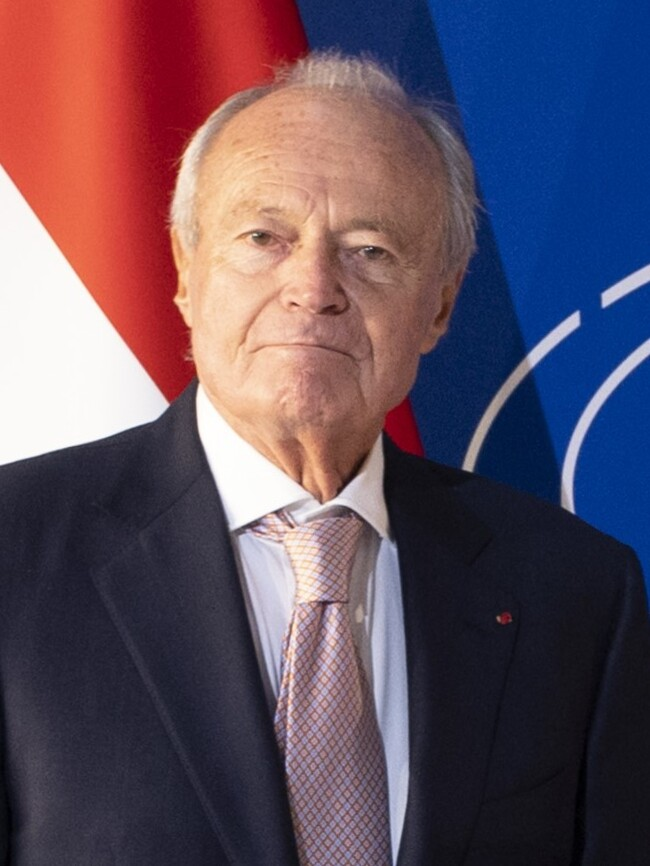
- Medgyessy in 2024

Prime Minister of Hungary
- In office 27 May 2002 – 29 September 2004
- President: Ferenc Mádl
- Preceded by: Viktor Orbán
- Succeeded by: Ferenc Gyurcsány

Member of the National Assembly
- In office 15 May 2002 – 15 May 2006

Minister of Finance
- In office 1 March 1996 – 8 July 1998
- Prime Minister: Gyula Horn
- Preceded by: Lajos Bokros
- Succeeded by: Zsigmond Járai
- In office 30 December 1986 – 16 December 1987
- Prime Minister: György Lázár; Károly Grósz
- Preceded by: István Hetényi
- Succeeded by: Miklós Villányi

Personal details
- Born: 19 October 1942 (age 83) Budapest, Hungary
- Party: MSZMP (until 1989); Independent (1989–present)
- Spouse: Katalin Csaplár
- Children: 3
- Profession: Economist
- Website: www.medgyessy.hu

Péter Medgyessy (Note: Hungarian pronunciation: [ˈpeːtɛr ˈmɛɟːɛʃi]) (born 19 October 1942) is a retired Hungarian politician who served as Prime Minister of Hungary from 27 May 2002 to 29 September 2004. On 25 August 2004, he resigned over disputes with coalition partner Alliance of Free Democrats, but remained as acting prime minister for a 30-day period as required by the Constitution, and a few additional days until his successor Ferenc Gyurcsány was confirmed by the National Assembly.

== Family and studies ==
Medgyessy was born into an old Transylvanian noble family in Budapest on 19 October 1942. An ancestor of the family, Miklós Medgyessy de Medgyes, worked as a penman for Prince Gabriel Bethlen in the 17th century. Medgyessy's father, Béla Medgyessy, was a recorder in the General Assembly of Cluj until the Second Vienna Award, when Hungary reassigned the territory of Northern Transylvania from the Kingdom of Romania. The family moved to Budapest, where Béla worked for the Ministry of Domestic Trade. Medgyessy's mother Ibolya Szolga was an interpreter.

Medgyessy studied theoretical economics at the Corvinus University of Budapest (then called Karl Marx University of Economic Sciences). He graduated in 1966, and returned to receive his doctorate. He is fluent in French and Romanian, and knowledgeable in the English and Russian languages.

He is married to Katalin Csaplár, and has a daughter and son born in 1969 and 1970, respectively, from a previous marriage. His adopted child is Anita Tornóczky, a well-known anchorwoman in Hungary.

== Political career ==
=== Early career ===
Between 1966 and 1982, he held various senior positions in departments of the Ministry of Finance. In 1982, he became Deputy Minister of Finance, and in 1987, he became Minister of Finance in György Lázár's cabinet, and held the position in the Károly Grósz administration. As minister, Medgyessy had a significant role in the preparation of a two-tier banking system and banking reform. He was replaced by Miklós Villányi on 16 December 1987.

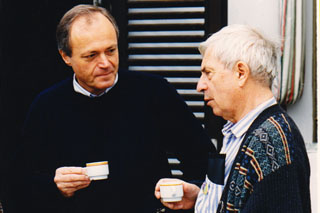
Medgyessy and Péter Bacsó in 1994, Balatonszárszó

Between 1987 and 1990, Medgyessy was Deputy Prime Minister for Economic Affairs in the Grósz and Miklós Németh cabinets. He brought the law of new capitalist-style tax system to the National Assembly of Hungary. Besides the ministerial position, Medgyessy was also elected a member of the Central Committee of the Hungarian Socialist Workers' Party. After the dissolution of the ruling communist state party in October 1989, he did not join the newly-founded successor organization, the Hungarian Socialist Party (MSZP).

After the end of communism in Hungary, Medgyessy briefly retired from politics. From 1990 to 1996, he was CEO and chairman of various Hungarian banks, including Paribas Bank Inc. and Hungarian Investment and Development Bank. After Gyula Horn took over the Hungarian government in 1994, Medgyessy was appointed head of the premier's Advisory Board before returning to his previous position as minister of finance, in March 1996, when he replaced Lajos Bokros, who resigned after the controversial Bokros package. After his term ended, he became the chairman of the Board of Directors of the Inter-Europa Bank, and vice president of Atlasz Insurance Company from 1998 to 2001. He also taught at College of Finance and Accountancy (now Budapest Business School) for 15 years beside bank official positions. He served as president of the Hungarian Economic Association.

He received the Commander's Cross with a Star of the Order of Merit in 1998, and the highest French decoration, the Chevalier of the Legion of Honour in 2000.

=== Prime Minister of Hungary ===
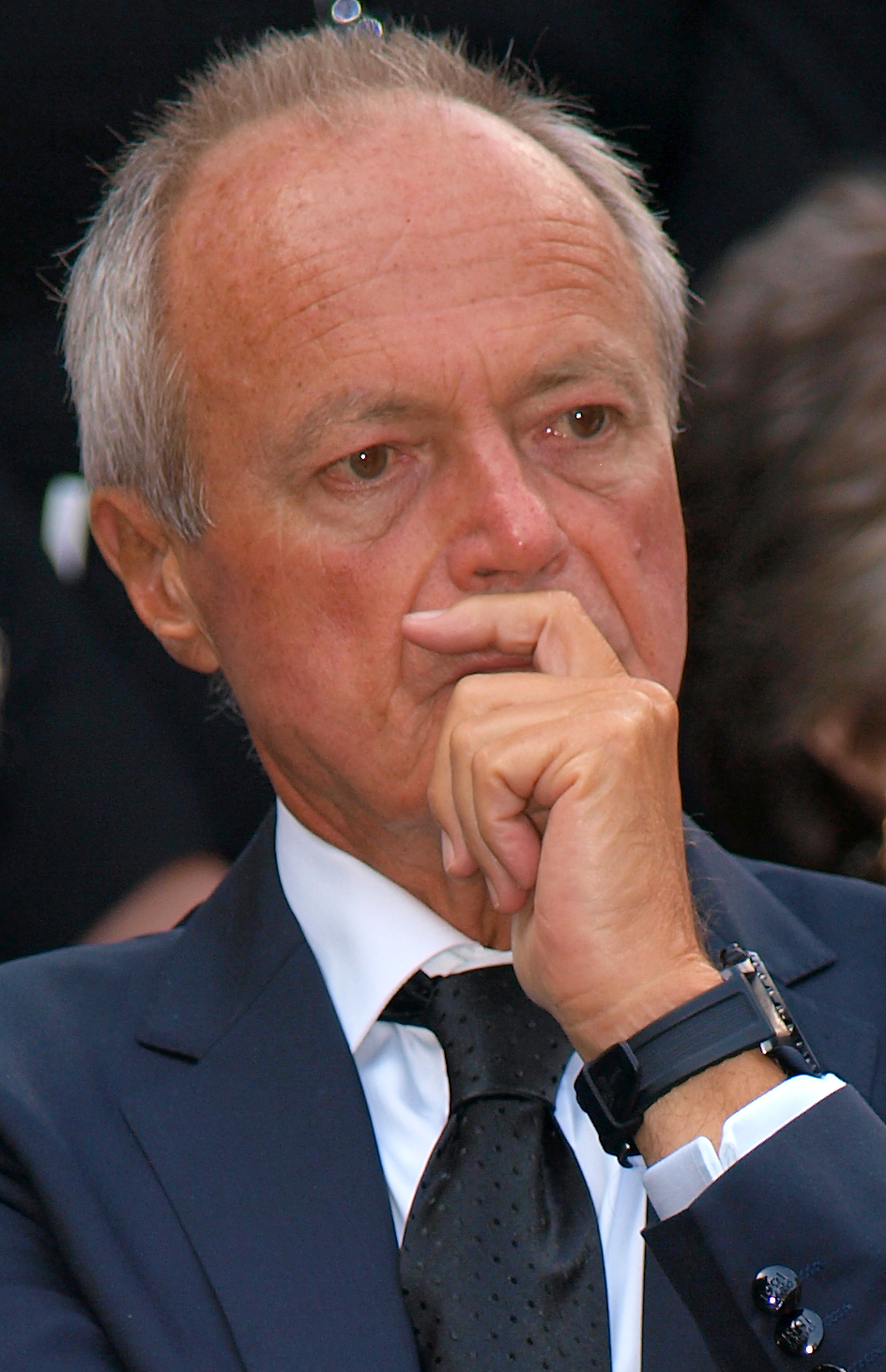
- Premiership of Péter Medgyessy; 27 May 2002 – 29 September 2004
- President: Ferenc Mádl
- Cabinet: Medgyessy Government
- Party: Independent
- Election: 2002

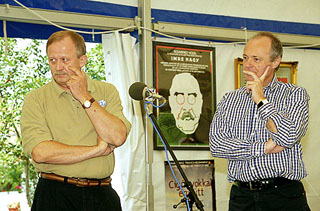
Medgyessy and SZDSZ leader Gábor Kuncze, 3 October 2001

The MSZP nominated him as their non-partisan candidate for prime minister during the seventh congress of the party in June 2001, after Németh and MP Sándor Nagy had withdrawn from nomination. The party won the 2002 elections against Fidesz and incumbent Prime Minister Viktor Orbán by a small majority, and on 27 May 2002, the Hungarian Parliament elected Medgyessy as the new Prime Minister of Hungary.

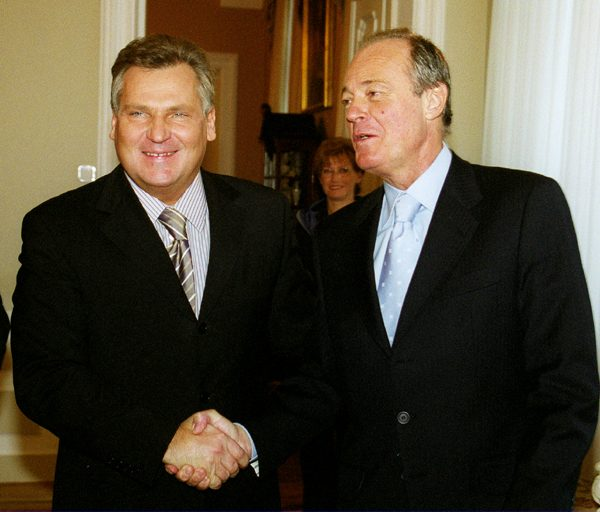
Medgyessy with President of Poland Aleksander Kwaśniewski, 20 July 2004

Magyar Nemzet, a newspaper affiliated with Fidesz, revealed in June 2002 that Medgyessy had been acting as a counterespionage officer under the code name D-209 in the III./II. section of the then-Ministry for Internal Affairs prior to 1989. He admitted to being a secret agent, saying that in the line of duty, he strived to secure Hungary's membership in the International Monetary Fund, which the Soviet Union was opposed to. Under the circumstances, this sparked controversy all over the country. At first, leaders of the coalition partner Alliance of Free Democrats (SZDSZ) had expressed their support for Medgyessy's dismissal as prime minister, but the Socialists persuaded them to let Medgyessy stay in office. In response, János Kis, the founding president of SZDSZ, left the party in July 2002, referring to the SZDSZ's decision as being in conflict with his moral values. In the aftermath of these events, demonstrators blocked traffic across the Elisabeth Bridge and demanded that a new tally of the parliamentary election results be conducted.

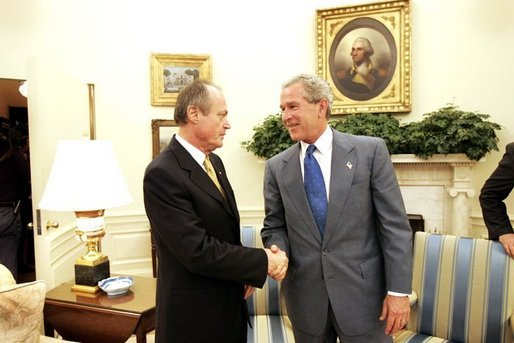
Medgyessy with U.S. President George W. Bush on 15 July 2004 at White House

One of the main campaign promises of MSZP was "The Welfare System Change". To implement it, the Medgyessy government announced a 100-day action program that provided a 50% increase of wage to public employees and a one-time HUF 19,000 allowance to pensioners. Academic scholarships and pensions that had not reached the amount of the minimum wage were also increased. These measures cost HUF 190 billion on the exchange rate. Fidesz and MDF MPs also voted in favour of the bill. At this time, Medgyessy's approval rating was the highest, and the government consequently adopted a second 100-day program afterwards. According to later critics, the two programs caused an excess spending of HUF 817 billion in the state budget, while, according to a 2009 report from the State Audit Office, the total annual cost of the housing subsidies rose from roughly HUF 50 billion (EUR 184.14 million) a year in 2000 to HUF 255 billion (EUR 939.14 million) in 2005.

Under Medgyessy's prime ministership, a referendum was held on 12 April 2003 to decide if Hungary should join the European Union. All of the major political parties in Hungary, the trade unions, business organisations, churches and media were in favour of Hungary's membership of the EU.

In early 2004, Medgyessy proposed a joint electoral list with the participation of all parliamentary parties for the European Parliament election. His idea was rejected by SZDSZ and all opposition parties, but during a meeting of leaders of the four parliamentary groups, all parties agreed to a "national minimum", which included partnerships and contacts in the European organizations. The European Parliament also called Medgyessy's proposal "anti-democratic" in March 2004. In the July 2004 elections, the Hungarian Socialist Party was heavily defeated by Fidesz. Afterwards, Medgyessy gradually lost support of the MSZP-SZDSZ alliance. Rumors spread within the MSZP that the party could not win another parliamentary election with him against Viktor Orbán. Meanwhile, Ferenc Gyurcsány, then the minister responsible for sports, youth, and children in his government, emerged as a potential candidate for prime minister.

Before his resignation, he had clashed with the SZDSZ, accusing them of involvement in corruption cases and preparing to dismiss SZDSZ-affiliated Minister of Economy István Csillag. In response, the SZDSZ withdrew its support, prompting him to resign to avoid a parliamentary vote of no confidence. The MSZP accepted his resignation, which took effect on 25 August, and in accordance with the Hungarian Constitution he became "acting Prime Minister" for the next 30 days. In the meantime his successor, Ferenc Gyurcsány, acted on his behalf. Medgyessy stepped down as prime minister in August 2004 and was succeeded by Gyurcsány.

== Controversies ==
Medgyessy was ridiculed by certain segments of the Budapest press because of his allegedly weak rhetorical abilities; a book titled Medgyessyizmusok (Medgyessyism, in analogy to Bushism) appeared in 2004.

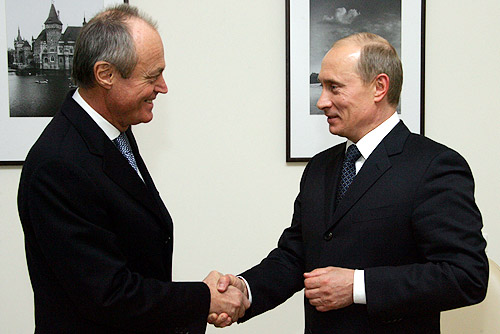
Medgyessy with Vladimir Putin

In response to Hungarian exporters' interests, he decided to decrease the central value of the floating exchange rate range of the forint. Investors considered his decision to be incomprehensible and a flawed piece of economic policy, causing them to sell forints and Hungarian government bonds, which led to significant interest rate hikes by the National Bank of Hungary.

Fulfilling the promise of the "change of welfare regime", the slogan of his campaign in the 2002 elections, the Medgyessy government increased the wages of civil servants by 50%, and increased allowances for university students and pensioners. Pensioners also received a one-time pension supplement. Economists criticised this move, calling it an irresponsible drain on the budget that amounted to nearly 190 billion forints, and hypothesised it was done purely to increase the administration's popularity.

During Medgyessy's prime ministership, political attacks were launched against some independent senior civil servants who had been appointed by the Orbán cabinet. Court rulings subsequently established that the head of the Hungarian Energy Office and the chairman of the Hungarian Statistical Office were removed from their positions unconstitutionally and illegally. The chief of the Hungarian Financial Supervisory Authority was removed without legal challenge, though without any material basis related to his performance in office.

Medgyessy was also a co-signatory of the letter of the eight, which supported the U.S. position on Iraq.

== Life since government ==
After his resignation, he continued to serve as a Member of Parliament as a travelling ambassador "to make sure Hungary can become a successful member of the most important international alliances including the European Union". He did not run as MP in the 2006 parliamentary election. He was called back by Gyurcsány in mid-2008 after he openly criticized the government in some of his interviews.

Medgyessy was interviewed by Index on the tenth anniversary of his resignation on 27 August 2014, where he called Gyurcsány a "Trojan Horse" and "traitor". According to Medgyessy, he was removed from the position of Prime Minister after a secret agreement between MSZP and SZDSZ leaders László Kovács, Ildikó Lendvai, Katalin Szili and Gábor Kuncze. He also said he would enact the 100-day action program again, but he regretted not revealing his D-209 agency past before the 2002 elections.

== Awards and merits ==
He received the Commander's Cross with a Star of the Hungarian Order of Merit in 1998, and the highest French decoration, the Chevalier of the Legion of Honour in 2000. In 2002 he received the Grand Cross of the Belgian Order of the Crown and the Gold and Silver Star of the Japanese Order of the Rising Sun, and in 2003, the Grand Cross of the Order of the Merit of Chile and the Royal Norwegian Order of St. Olav. In 2004 he became a Grand Officer of the French Legion of Honour and received the German Federal Cross of Merit.

== Selected publications ==
- Csizmadia, Ervin: A Medgyessy-talány. A nemzeti középtől (a) végig. Századvég Kiadó, Budapest, 2004.
- Csizmadia, Ervin: "Elképzeltek maguknak egy miniszterelnököt". Csizmadia Ervin interjúja Medgyessy Péterrel (interview). Századvég Kiadó, Budapest, 2004.
- Medgyessy, Péter: Polgár a pályán. Kossuth Kiadó, Budapest, 2006.
- Perger, István (ed.): Medgyessy. Ringier Kiadó, Budapest, 2004.

== Notes ==
Political offices
Preceded by István Hetényi	Minister of Finance; 1986–1987	Succeeded by Miklós Villányi
Preceded by Lajos Bokros	Minister of Finance; 1996–1998	Succeeded by Zsigmond Járai
Preceded by Viktor Orbán	Prime Minister of Hungary; 2002–2004	Succeeded by Ferenc Gyurcsány
