= Tamás Deutsch =

Hungarian politician (born 1966)

Tamás Deutsch MEP
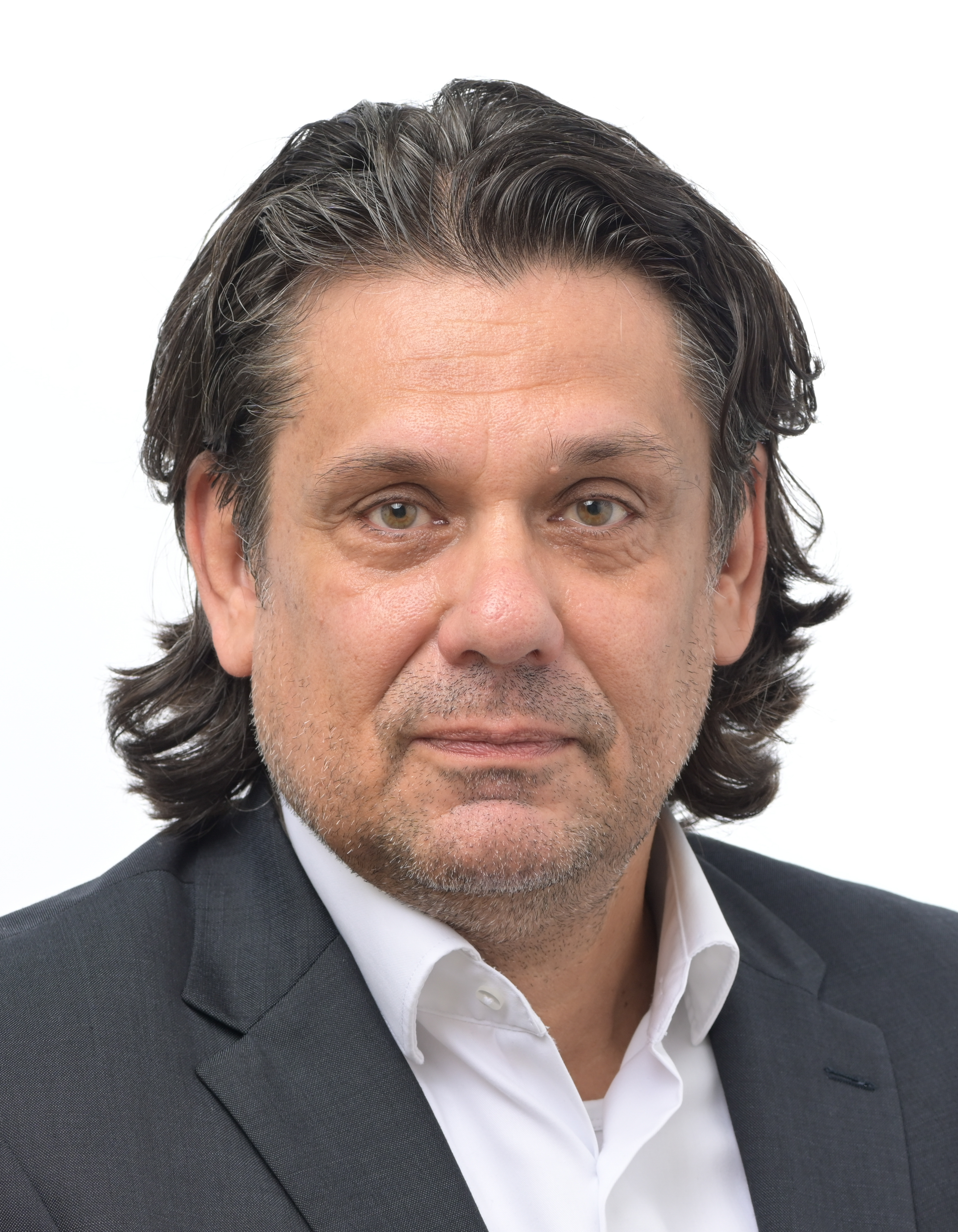

Member of the European Parliament
- Incumbent
- Assumed office 14 July 2009
- Constituency: Hungary

Minister of Youth Affairs and Sports
- In office 1 January 1999 – 27 May 2002
- Prime Minister: Viktor Orbán
- Preceded by: position established
- Succeeded by: György Jánosi

Member of the National Assembly
- In office 2 May 1990 – 13 July 2009

Personal details
- Born: 27 July 1966 (age 60) Budapest, Hungary
- Party: Fidesz (1988–present)
- Spouse(s): Krisztina Fresszel (m. 1989; div. 2004) Ágnes Sarolta Für (m. 2005; div. 2008) Erika Lazsányi (m. 2012)
- Children: 5, including Bence
- Relatives: Lajos Für (former father-in-law)
- Education: Eötvös Loránd University

Tamás Deutsch (born 27 July 1966) is a Hungarian politician and Member of the European Parliament (MEP) from Hungary. He is a member of Fidesz, part of the Patriots for Europe group. He was a member of the Hungarian Parliament between 1990 and 2009 and Minister of Youth Affairs and Sports between 1999 and 2002.

== Political career ==
He finished Kaffka Margit Secondary School in Budapest in 1984. He studied at the Faculty of Law of the Eötvös Loránd University of Budapest from 1986 to 1992, and graduated in 1999. He was a member of the Social Science Circle of Law Students from 1987 (which was renamed as Bibó István Circle of Law Students in 1988). He has been a member of the Hungarian association of the International Children's Safety Service since May 1990. He was vice president of the Hungarian Olympic Committee from 1999 to 2001.

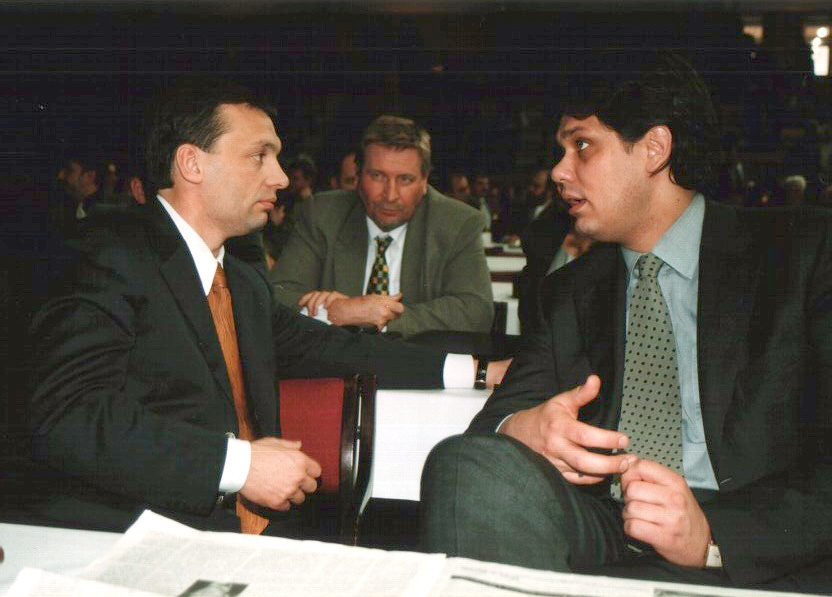
Viktor Orbán and Tamás Deutsch in 2000

In 1988 he participated in the foundation of Fidesz and was one of its spokespersons from March to October 1988. He was a member of the National Board from 1988 to 1990. He was an organiser of the ceremonial reburial of Imre Nagy and his fellow politicians on 16 June 1989. He was campaign manager in the 1990 local elections and the 1998 parliamentary elections. Re-elected in all of the party elections, he held the office of Fidesz' deputy president from April 1993 to May 2003. He headed the Budapest organisation of the party from 2001 to 2004. He was elected member of the General Assembly of the Municipality of Budapest and faction leader of Fidesz, he resigned from his post as Assembly faction leader on 16 September 2003.

He had been an MP since 1990 (elected from the Budapest list in 1990 and 1994, and representing Constituency 9, Budapest, 7th district). He was elected deputy leader of the Fidesz faction in Parliament in April 1990, and was re-elected in 1994 as well as 1998. He was "notarie of age" ("notaries of age" are the four youngest Members in the constituent sitting) in 1990 and 1994. He was minister for Youth and Sports from 1 January 1999 to 27 May 2002. He was elected deputy faction leader of Fidesz in May 2002. He was elected deputy speaker of Parliament on 8 December 2003 and took office on 1 February 2004.

In the parliamentary elections in 2006 he secured a seat from national (elective) list. He was a vice chairman of the Committee on Immunity, Incompatibility and Mandate. He resigned from his mandate in 2009, when he became a member of the European Parliament.

Following the 2014 Internet tax protests, Viktor Orbán commissioned Deutsch to organize the conditions for so-called "national consultation" and compile its questions. Deutsch was appointed Prime Ministerial Commissioner for the Digital Prosperity Programme on 19 December 2014.

In December 2020, fellow group members called for Deutsch's exclusion from their group after Deutsch had compared a statement of their group leader Manfred Weber alike to the Gestapo's and ÁVH's principles. Two weeks later the group decided not to exclude him.

== Private life ==
Tamás Deutsch is Jewish. He divorced twice. His second wife was Ágnes Sarolta Für, a daughter of former Minister of Defence Lajos Für, is a program organiser. During this marriage Deutsch took his wife's last name, so his name was Tamás Deutsch-Für between 2006 and 2008. He has five children. One of his sons, Bence Deutsch, played as a footballer for the junior team of MTK Budapest FC.

Tamás Deutsch became chairman of MTK on 26 May 2010. He was one of the candidates for the post of chairman of the Hungarian Fencing Federation in 2012, but lost to Zsolt Csampa.

== Twitter incident ==
After the Őszöd speech, and after the 50th anniversary commemorations of the Revolution of 1956, during which the police brutally attacked peaceful protesters at a Fidesz rally, on Twitter, Deutsch wrote: "There are vile people. There are madmen of ill-will. There are disgusting stinkers. There are loathsome faggots. And there is Gyurcsány." In an interview with HVG, Deutsch acknowledged his words about Gyurcsány. On 27 July he tweeted: "Who the fuck is Thomas Melia?" This remark was widely condemned by liberals and socialists. Commenting on his remarks, Deutsch called them humorous, a kind of comedy.

Political offices
Preceded by post established	Minister of Youth Affairs and Sports; 1999–2002	Succeeded by György Jánosi
