= Lajos Bokros =

Hungarian economist

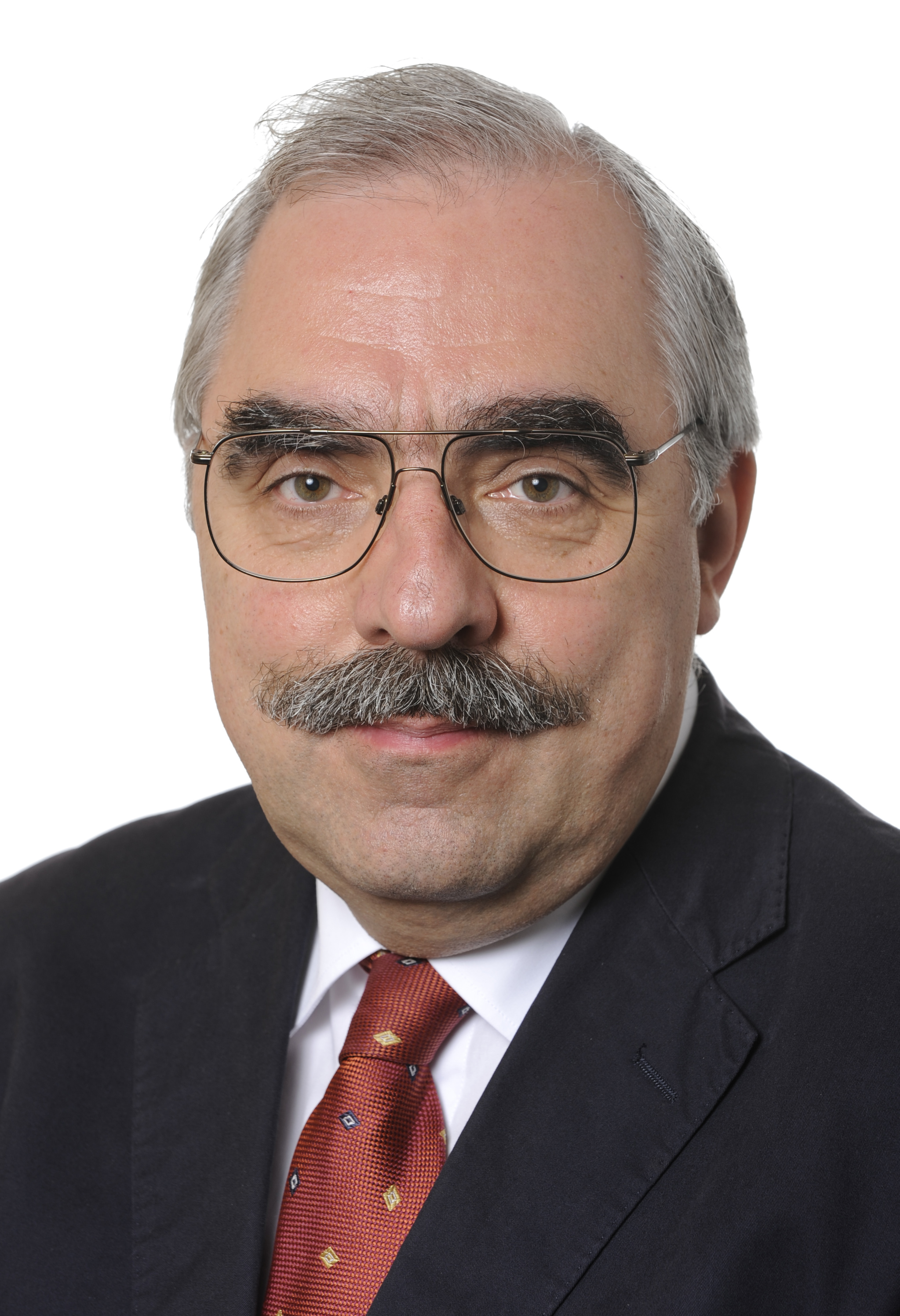
- Official portrait, 2009

Member of the European Parliament for Hungary
- In office 2 July 2009 – 7 July 2014
- Constituency: Hungary

Minister of Finance
- In office 1 March 1995 – 29 February 1996
- President: Gyula Horn
- Preceded by: László Békesi
- Succeeded by: Péter Medgyessy

Personal details
- Born: 26 June 1954 (age 72) Budapest, Hungary
- Party: MSZMP (until 1990); MSZP (1990–1991); MDF (2009–2011); MoMa (2013–2019)
- Spouse: Mária Gyetvai
- Children: András; Ildikó
- Profession: Politician, economist

Lajos András Bokros (born 26 June 1954) is a Hungarian economist, who served as Minister of Finance from 1995 to 1996. He was a Member of the European Parliament for Hungary in the 2009–2014 session. He was the leader of the Movement for a Modern Hungary, which he founded in April 2013, and sat in the European Conservatives and Reformists group in the European Parliament. The Bokros package was named after him.

== Financial career ==
Bokros was born in Budapest. He graduated from and holds a Ph.D. from the Budapest University of Economics. He successfully applied for the scholarship of University of Panama in 1976, where he learned to speak fluent Spanish. He wrote his dissertation on the industrialization, integration and common market developments in Central America.

He was director of the State Property Agency of Hungary between 1990 and 1991. He was chairman and chief executive officer at the Budapest Bank between 1991 and 1995. He is a full professor (Department of Public Policy) and former chief operating officer of the Central European University.

Bokros was the Minister of Finance between 1995 and 1996 in the government of Gyula Horn. He is best known for the so-called "Bokros package"; a string of austerity measures implemented during his term as Finance Minister. He resigned from his position in February 1996. He was replaced by Péter Medgyessy.

Between 1997 and 2000, Lajos Bokros was Director for Private Sector and Finance at the World Bank. There, together with Stjn Claessens, Simeon Djankov, and Gerhard Pohl he worked on enterprise restructuring in Georgia, Moldova, and Romania. As director, Lajos Bokros also led the assistance in restructuring the Russian banking sector after the 1997–1998 banking crisis.

== Political career ==
Supported by the Hungarian Democratic Forum (MDF), Bokros was elected to the European Parliament in the 2009 election and sat in the European Conservatives and Reformists Group. He was a full member of the Committee on Budgets and a substitute member of the Committee on Economic and Monetary Affairs. Bokros' nomination indicated a change of political position from conservative to liberal ideology. As a result, several prominent members left the party, including Péter Olajos, Kálmán Katona and former Prime Minister Péter Boross. With MP András Csáky's quit, the Hungarian Democratic Forum's parliamentary group defunct according to the house rules in March 2009.

He was the MDF's candidate for the position of Prime Minister of Hungary on the 2010 Hungarian parliamentary election. Under his influence, several other former left-wing politicians were placed on the national list, furthermore MDF entered into an electoral alliance with Alliance of Free Democrats (SZDSZ), which suffered a crushing defeat during the 2009 European Parliament election. After the decision, the quits became a mass phenomenon, whole local party organizations ceased to exist. On the national election, MDF came to the fifth place and received only 2.67% of the votes, thus shut out of the legislature altogether for the first time since the transition to democracy, after twenty years. Bokros left MDF when the party dissolved in 2011. The successor party, Democratic Community of Welfare and Freedom (JESZ) called Bokros several times to give back his MEP mandate, but all relationship has been lost between Bokros and his former party.

On 21 April 2013, Bokros founded the liberal conservative Modern Hungary Movement (MoMa). The party planned to run in the 2014 European Parliament election, however its registration was refused by the National Election Office (NVI). As a result, Bokros lost his European Parliament mandate. Bokros also ran for Mayor of Budapest in the 2014 municipal election. On 29 September 2014, two other candidates, the independent György Magyar and candidate of the leftist opposition parties' Ferenc Falus withdrew from the election and supported Bokros. Bokros received 36.04% of the votes and came to the second place after István Tarlós. He was supported by the Together 2014, Democratic Coalition and Budapest branch of the Hungarian Socialist Party.

== Personal life ==
Bokros is married to Mária Gyetvai. They have two children, Ildikó and András.

Political offices
Preceded by László Békesi	Minister of Finance; 1995–1996	Succeeded by Péter Medgyessy
