= Sándor Nagy =

Sándor Nagy may refer to:

- Sándor Nagy (figure skater), Hungarian figure skater
- Sándor Nagy (footballer, born 1988), Hungarian footballer
- Sándor Nagy (footballer, born 1972), Romanian-Hungarian footballer and football manager
- Sándor Nagy (politician) (1946–2015), Hungarian politician
- Sándor Nagy (swimmer) (born 1960), Hungarian swimmer
- Sándor Juhász Nagy (1883–1946), Hungarian politician
