= 2014 Budapest mayoral election =

- 12 October 2014
- Turnout: 43.1%
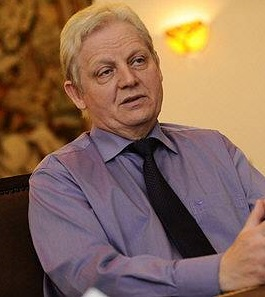

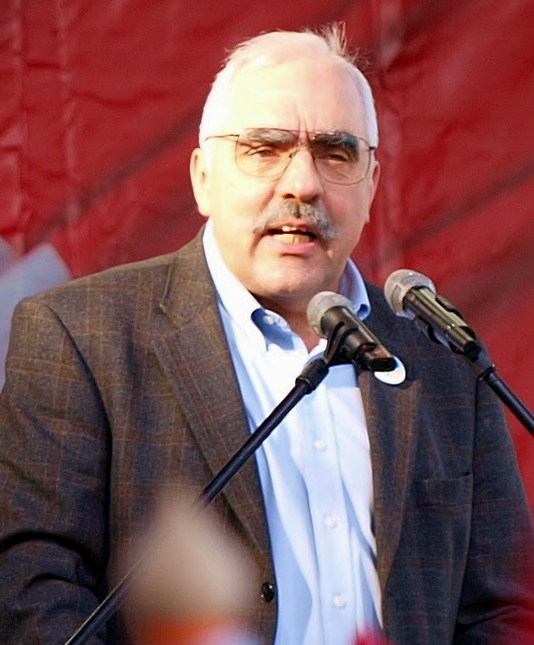

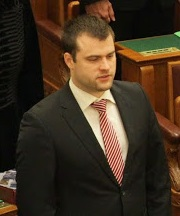

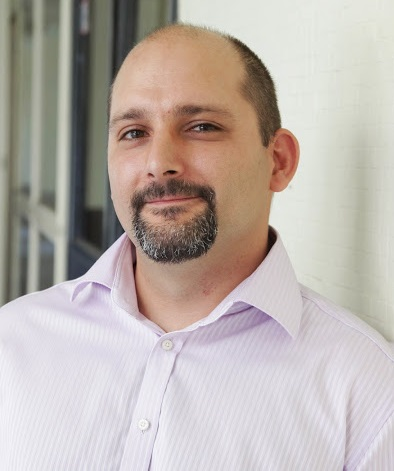
Candidate	István Tarlós	Lajos Bokros
Party	Independent	MoMa
Alliance	Fidesz–KDNP
Vote	290 675	213 550
Percentage	49.06%	36.04%
Candidate	Gábor Staudt	Antal Csárdi
Party	Jobbik	LMP
Vote	42 093	33 689
Percentage	7.10%	5.69%
Mayor before election
István Tarlós
Fidesz–KDNP
Elected Mayor
István Tarlós
Fidesz–KDNP

The 2014 Budapest mayoral election was held on 12 October 2014 to elect the Mayor of Budapest (főpolgármester). On the same day, local elections were held throughout Hungary, including the districts of Budapest. The election was run using a First-past-the-post voting system. In contrast with previous elections where the Mayor served a 4-year term, the winner of this election served for 5 years.

The election was won by incumbent Mayor, and the governing parties' candidate, István Tarlós.

== Campaign ==
Originally, the left-wing opposition, which ran united in the parliamentary elections of April, selected Ferenc Falus, a hospital director nominated by the Together (Együtt) party as its candidate. After bad polling, and campaign mistakes (including an Ice Bucket Challenge video), Falus withdrew on 29 September and endorsed minor party candidate and former Minister of Finance Lajos Bokros.

== Results ==
Candidate	Party	Votes	%	+/–
István Tarlós	Fidesz–KDNP	290,675	49.06	–4.31
Lajos Bokros	Modern Hungary Movement	213,550	36.04	New
Gábor Staudt	Jobbik	42,093	7.10	–0.17
Antal Csárdi	Politics Can Be Different	33,689	5.69	–4.20
Zoltán Bodnár	Hungarian Liberal Party	12,461	2.10	New
Total		592,468	100.00	–
