= Mihály Kupa =

Hungarian politician (1941–2024)

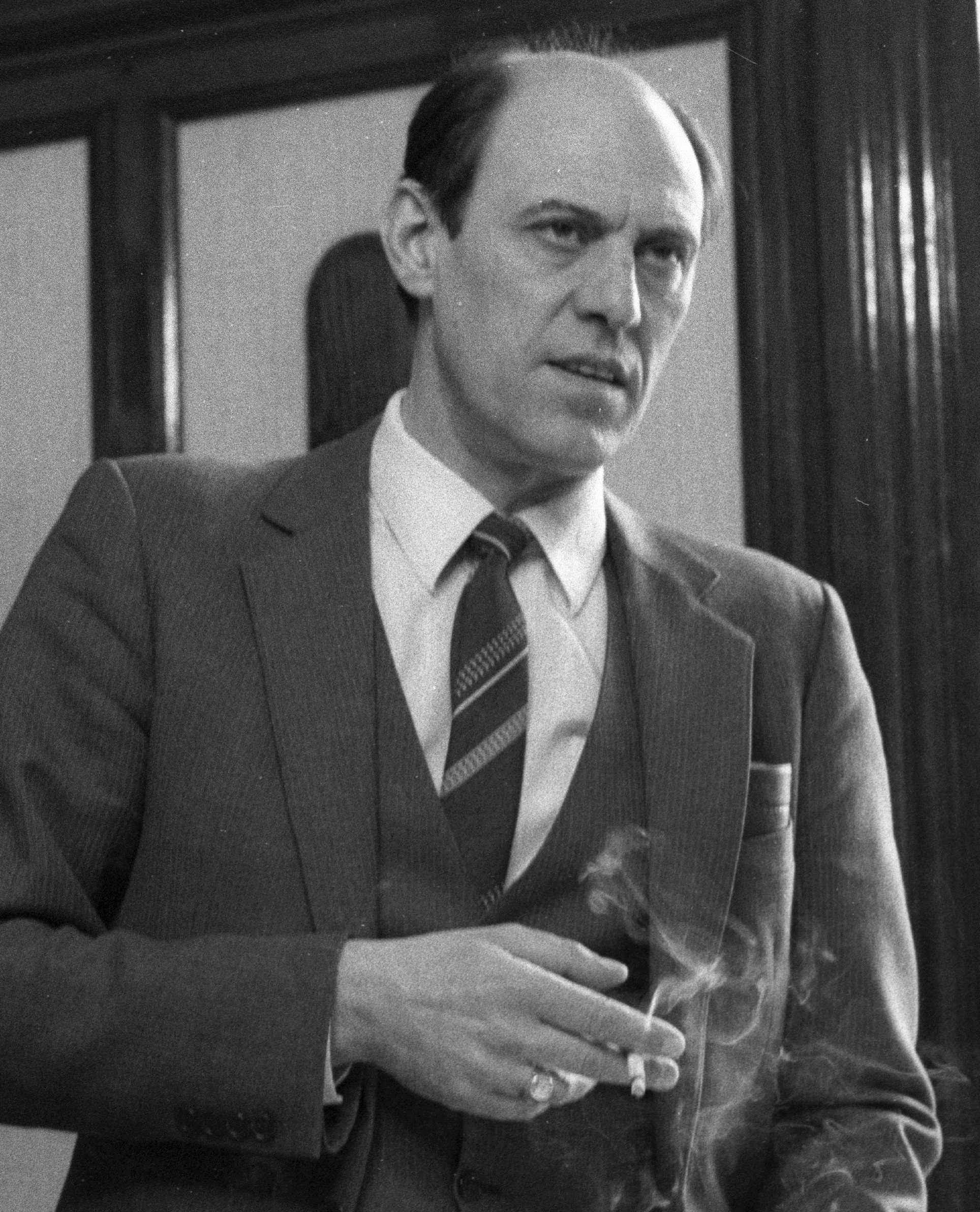
- Kupa in 1986

Minister of Finance
- In office 20 December 1990 – 11 February 1993
- Prime Minister: József Antall
- Preceded by: Ferenc Rabár
- Succeeded by: Iván Szabó

Personal details
- Born: 3 April 1941 Budapest, Hungary
- Died: September 2024 (aged 83)
- Party: MDF, Centre Party
- Children: 4
- Profession: Politician, economist

Mihály Kupa (3 April 1941 – 2 September 2024) was a Hungarian politician, who served as Minister of Finance between 1990 and 1993. He was arrested in 1958 for ten months. He finished his studies at the Karl Marx University of Economic Sciences in 1969. After his graduation he worked at the National Statistical Office and several other research institutions. He travelled to Angola for a short time in 1984, where he worked as a financial adviser. After his return he worked at the Ministry of Finance.

When Ferenc Rabár resigned, Kupa was appointed Minister of Finance by Prime Minister József Antall. He became a member of the National Assembly of Hungary in 1991. He also worked as a Vice Chairman of the Governing Council of the European Bank for Reconstruction and Development (EBRD) and as Speaker of the International Monetary Fund's and World Bank's General Assembly. Kupa resigned from his ministerial position and also left the Hungarian Democratic Forum faction in 1993, and served as an independent MP until the next election. He did not gain a mandate. He was appointed chairman of the Hungarian Market Association in 1996.

During the 1998 election he won a mandate, so he became the only independent representative in the National Assembly. Kupa founded the Centre Party in 2001. The new party missed the 5% electoral threshold and Kupa stepped back in the second round of the 2002 election. He retired from politics in 2007.

Kupa died in September 2024, at the age of 83.

== Sources ==
- Biography
- Mihály Kupa retired

Political offices
Preceded by Ferenc Rabár	Minister of Finance; 1990–1993	Succeeded by Iván Szabó
