= Szófia Havas =

Hungarian politician and doctor

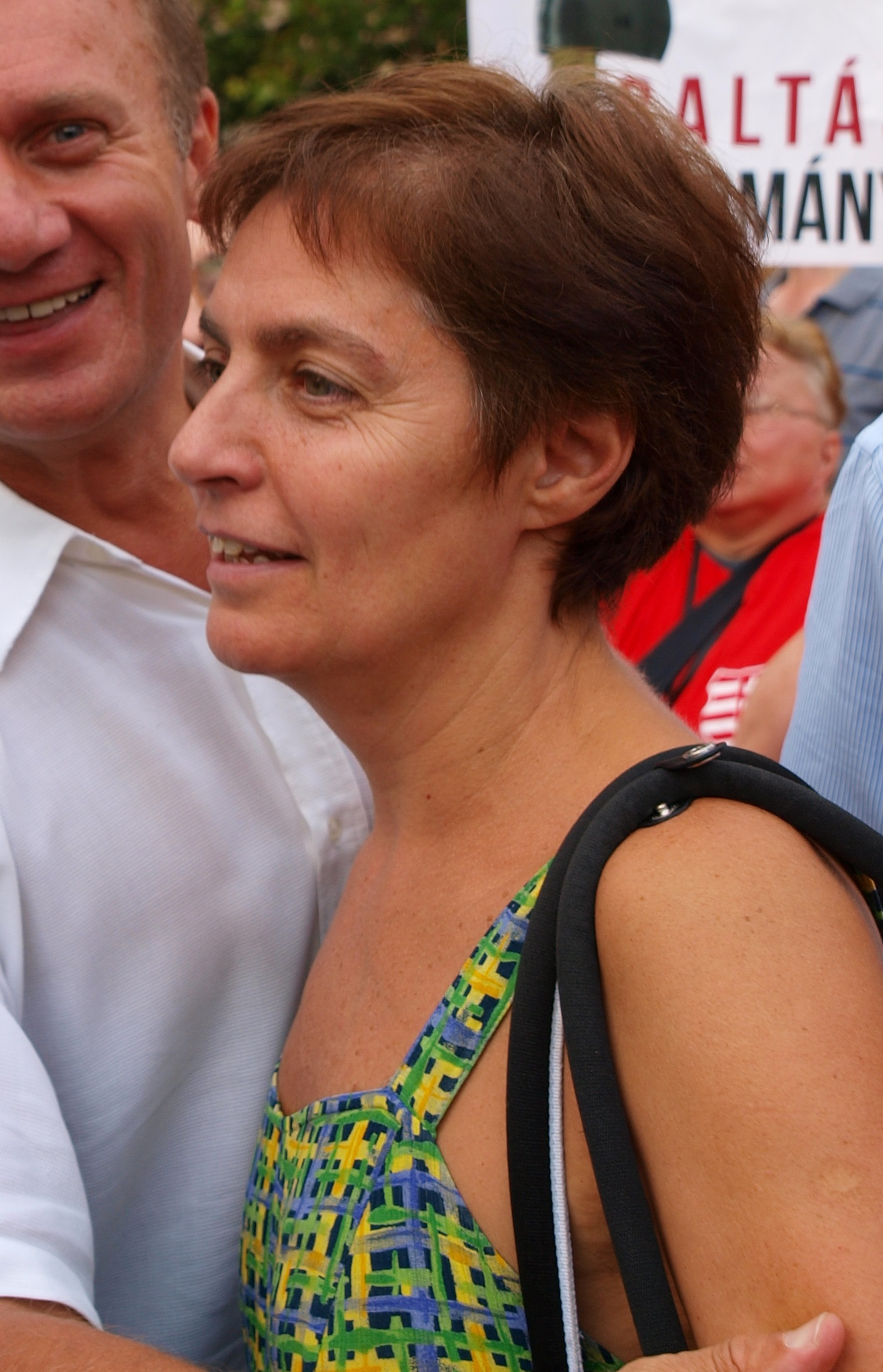
Szófia Havas

Szófia Havas (born Szófia Horn, 2 November 1955, Budapest) is a Hungarian politician and doctor.

== Biography ==
Havas graduated from the ELTE Miklós Radnóti school in Budapest in 1974, then in 1980, she graduated with a doctorate from Semmelweis University in their medical faculty, graduating cum laude. In 1998, she became part of the Health Services Management department of the Corvinus University of Budapest.

She began her medical path at the Frigyes Korányi hospital, and in 1983, she was part the National Institute of Mental Health and worked both as a physician and as an assistant. Between 1984 and 1990, she worked at the Újpest Hospital auxiliary, and, between 1990 and 1996, at Bajcsy-Zsilinszky Hospital, and worked, as a lecturer, since 1999 as the Medical Director of Észak-Pesti Hospital.

In 1977, she joined the Hungarian Socialist Workers' Party (Hungarian Socialist Party since 1993) as a member where, since 1995, she worked at the Department of Health as an executive and party branch in Budapest and as President since 1996. From 1995 until 2002, she was a counsellor of the Ministry of Welfare. In December 1994 and October 1998, she was part of the municipal elections as an MP candidate, and was, on 20 October 2002, elected a Municipal Assembly member and vice chairman of the health committee. She represented the 2nd district of Budapest, where she is also a member of the Health and Sport Committee. On 10 September 2007, Dr. Tibor Bakonyi become her successor MP, and he is a Health Committee member since 17 September 2007. She is married, and the mother of two girls. Her father, Géza Horn, was a film director, and her uncle, Gyula Horn, was the former Prime Minister of Hungary. Sofia bears the surname of her stepfather.

In 2010, she was not part of the National Assembly; however, in the Hungarian local elections in 2010, the Hungarian Socialist Party was once again included in the Metropolitan Assembly.

== See more ==
- Data profile at the homepage of Hungarian Socialist Party
- In the Parliament
