= Manó Vályi =

Jewish council member in Hungary

- Born: Manó Weiner; 23 September 1891; Szombathely, Austria-Hungary
- Died: 23 April 1975 (aged 83); Szombathely, Hungary
- Known for: head of the Judenrat in Szombathely
- Spouse: Rózsa Pollák

Manó Vályi (born Weiner; 23 September 1891 – 23 April 1975) was a Hungarian Jewish merchant and religious leader. He presided the Judenrat in Szombathely during the Holocaust.

== Career ==
Manó Vályi was born as Weiner into a Neolog Jewish family in Szombathely on 23 September 1891, as the youngest surviving child of Jakab Weiner and Franciska Fischer. He attended the local Jewish school, then graduated from the local trade school. He earned a degree at the Commercial College of Kassa (present-day Košice, Slovakia). He fought as a first sergeant in the Serbian campaign at the beginning of the World War I. On 28 November 1914, he led a small 400-member contingent, the first battalion of the 37th Infantry Regiment, which successfully repelled the Serbs' offensive at Konatice. For his merits, he was awarded the Gold Medal of Bravery in 1915. At the end of the war, he became a prisoner of war held by the Kingdom of Italy.

Returning Hungary, Vályi married Rózsa Pollák (1888–1964) on 9 March 1919. They had three sons, Péter (1919–1973), Gábor (1922–2003) and Sándor (1924–2015).

After the First World War, Vályi worked as a timber merchant and was involved in brick industry too. He was a founding member of the Association of Front-Fighters and was a member of the presidium of the Revisionist League. He also became a leader of the local Neolog Jewish congregation in Szombathely.

== During the Holocaust ==
His elder sons, Péter and Gábor were forced to labour service in the early 1940s. Following the German invasion of Hungary in March 1944, Vályi was appointed president of the Judenrat of Szombathely by János Biringer, head of the regional Jewish council of Győr. He held the position for only a week, when he was succeeded by Imre Wesel. Because of his WW1 past, he and his family received exemption of wearing yellow badge, and they successfully avoided their deportation too.

Vályi remained active in organizing the life in the local ghetto; he continuously delivered food and letters, but he was also the one who kept in touch with the German authorities (he once personally took ransom of 50,000 pengős to the accommodation of the local German liaison officer). He interceded for the family of the arrested Wesel, who were thus able to travel to Budapest and later leave the country via the Kastner train.

Following the Arrow Cross Party coup, Vályi was arrested on 22 October 1944 with the trumped-up charge that he signaled the American bombers with a flashlight. He and his son Sándor were again arrested on 31 December; they were beaten and tortured for months, while his documents certifying his exemptions were confiscated and destroyed. They were transferred to Sopronkőhida in March 1945, where they freed after the Red Army liberated the region.

== Later life ==
Manó Vályi worked for the industrial department of Vas County council after the war. He functioned as head of the Jewish religious community of Szombathely for a brief time. He was a member of the Vas County Football Federation in 1963. He died on 25 April 1975. One of his sons, Péter served as Minister of Finance (1967–1971) then Deputy Prime Minister (1971–1973) until his accidental death at the Metallurgical Works in Miskolc.

== Sources ==
- Veszprémy, László Bernát (2021). "Kik vezették a vidéki zsidó tanácsokat? [Who led the rural Jewish councils?]". Múlt és Jövő (Új folyam) (in Hungarian). 32 (1): 101–117. ISSN 0864-8646.
- Veszprémy, László Bernát (2023). Tanácstalanság. A zsidó vezetés Magyarországon és a holokauszt, 1944–1945 [Bereft of Council. Jewish leadership in Hungary during the Holocaust in 1944–1945] (in Hungarian). Budapest: Jaffa Kiadó. ISBN 978-963-475-731-3.
