= György Jánosi =

Hungarian politician

György Jánosi (born Szekszárd, 21 January 1954) is a Hungarian Socialist politician. He served as Minister of Youth Affairs and Sports between 2002 and 2003. He was followed by Ferenc Gyurcsány who later became prime minister. György Jánosi was the Chairman of the National Assembly of Hungary's Committee of Education between 1996 and 2010.

== Personal life ==
He is married. His wife is Rozália Jánosiné Kühstahler. They have two daughters, Eszter and Kata.

Political offices
Preceded by Tamás Deutsch	Minister of Youth Affairs and Sports; 2002–2003	Succeeded by Ferenc Gyurcsány
