= Ferenc Rabár =

Hungarian politician

Minister of Finance of Hungary
- In office 23 May 1990 – 10 December 1990
- President: Miklos Nemeth
- Preceded by: László Békesi
- Succeeded by: Mihály Kupa

Personal details
- Born: 4 June 1929
- Died: 29 December 1999 (aged 70)
- Political party: Independent
- Profession: politician, economist

Ferenc Rabár (4 June 1929 – 29 December 1999) was a Hungarian politician, who served as Minister of Finance in 1990.

Political offices
Preceded by László Békesi	Minister of Finance; 1990	Succeeded by Mihály Kupa
