= Péter Vályi =

Hungarian politician (1919–1973)

Minister of Finance of Hungary
- In office 14 April 1967 – 12 May 1971
- Prime Minister: Jenő Fock
- Preceded by: Mátyás Tímár
- Succeeded by: Lajos Faluvégi

Personal details
- Born: 25 December 1919 Szombathely, Kingdom of Hungary
- Died: 18 September 1973 (aged 53) Miskolc, People's Republic of Hungary
- Party: MDP, MSZMP
- Profession: politician, economist

Péter Vályi (25 December 1919 – 18 September 1973) was a Hungarian politician who had been the deputy chairman of the Council of Ministers, equivalent to Deputy Prime Minister from 1971 until his accidental death in 1973, and had served as Minister of Finance between 1967 and 1971.

== Career ==
Vályi was born into a Jewish family in Szombathely, as the son of merchant Manó Vályi and Rózsa Pollák. His brothers were art historian Gábor Vályi (1922–2003) and trade manager Sándor Vályi (1924–2015).

Vályi worked as a chemical engineer. He was arrested in 1945 because of his communist activities. He joined the Hungarian Communist Party in the same year. From 1948 he worked for the National Planning Board. From May 1971 onward he served as deputy chairman of the Council of Ministers (Deputy Prime Minister), second to Chairman Jenő Fock. Vályi did considerable work in connection with the reform of the economic mechanism. He was a member of the MSZMP's Central Committee from November 1970.

== Death ==
Vályi died as the consequence of a fall suffered during a visit to the Lenin Metallurgical Works in Miskolc on 18 September 1973. In the most dangerous part of the factory he fell into the casting pit. His body was trapped between the molds and by the time he had been pulled out, his nylon suit had burnt onto his body. The CEO, who tried to help the deputy minister, also suffered burns. Vályi died in a hospital after long suffering.

Many conspiracy theories have been published after the incident. The reformist politician could have stood in the way of the political leadership of the Eastern Bloc. A few days before Vályi's death, the Polish Deputy Prime Minister, who was also a pro-Western, died when hit by a car.

Political offices
Preceded by Mátyás Tímár	Minister of Finance; 1967–1971	Succeeded by Lajos Faluvégi
