= Miklós Villányi =

Hungarian politician (born 1931)

Minister of Finance of Hungary
- In office 15 December 1987 – 10 May 1989
- Prime Minister: Károly Grósz; Miklós Németh
- Preceded by: Péter Medgyessy
- Succeeded by: László Békesi

Personal details
- Born: 5 March 1931 (age 95)
- Party: MSZMP
- Profession: politician, economist

Miklós Villányi (born 5 March 1931) is a Hungarian former politician, who served as Minister of Finance between 1987 and 1989.

Political offices
Preceded by Péter Medgyessy	Minister of Finance; 1987–1989	Succeeded by László Békesi
