= István Hetényi =

Hungarian politician (1926–2008)

Minister of Finance of Hungary
- In office 27 June 1980 – 31 December 1986
- Prime Minister: György Lázár
- Preceded by: Lajos Faluvégi
- Succeeded by: Péter Medgyessy

Personal details
- Born: 3 August 1926 Budapest, Kingdom of Hungary
- Died: 11 November 2008 (aged 82) Budapest, Hungary
- Party: MDP, MSZMP
- Children: Zsuzsa Hetényi
- Profession: politician, economist

István Hetényi (3 August 1926 – 11 November 2008) was a Hungarian politician, who served as Minister of Finance between 1980 and 1986.

Political offices
Preceded by Lajos Faluvégi	Minister of Finance; 1980–1986	Succeeded by Péter Medgyessy
