= Ildikó Lendvai =

Hungarian politician (born 1946)

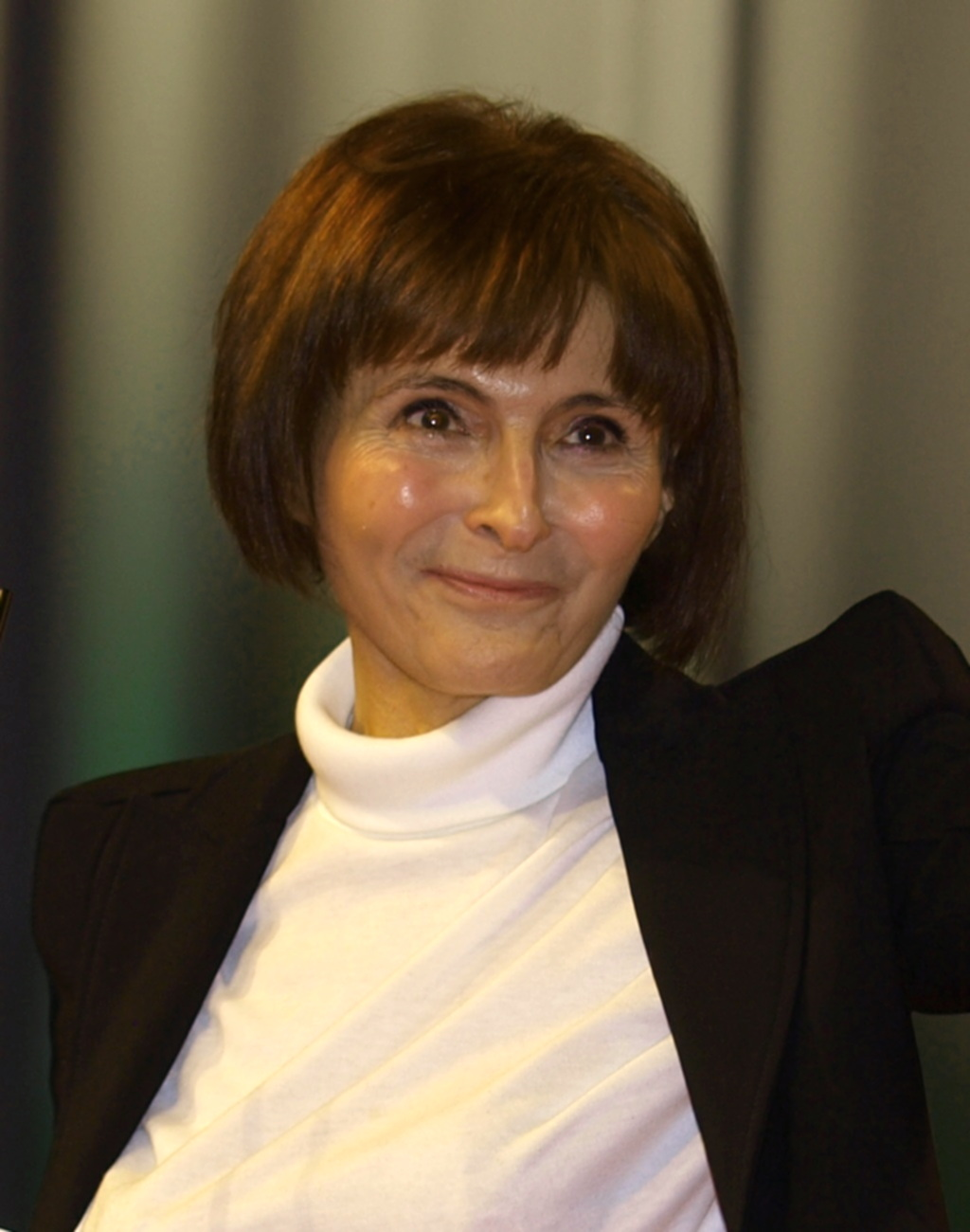

Chairperson of the Hungarian Socialist Party
- In office 5 April 2009 – 10 July 2010
- Preceded by: Ferenc Gyurcsány
- Succeeded by: Attila Mesterházy

Personal details
- Born: 20 July 1946 (age 80) Debrecen, Hungary
- Party: Hungarian Socialist Workers' Party, Hungarian Socialist Party
- Children: 1
- Occupation: politician
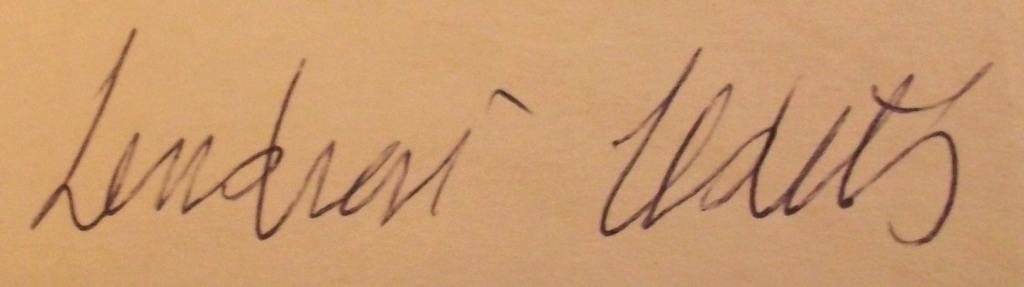
- Signature

Ildikó Lendvai (born 20 July 1946) is a Hungarian politician, who served as the leader of the Hungarian Socialist Party (MSZP) between 5 April 2009 and 10 July 2010.

== Biography ==
Ildikó Lendvai was born in Debrecen, Hungary on 20 July 1946. She spent her childhood in Nagykanizsa, Pécs and Szolnok, following the movement of the family due to different jobs taken by her father. She was five when the family moved to Budapest, she graduated from Varga Katalin High School there in 1964. She received a teacher's degree majoring in History and Hungarian from ELTE university in 1972 she added philosophy in 1974.

Between 1969 and 1972, she was a teacher at Móra Ferenc High School and she taught from 1974 at Keszthely University of Agriculture at the philosophy department. In 1974 she became a member of Hungarian Socialist Workers' Party (MSZMP) and started working at the cultural department of the Hungarian Young Communist League (KISZ). Then from 1984 started working for the Central Committee of the party again handling cultural matters. After rising through the ranks and becoming deputy department chief she limited the possibility for publication for works and writers considered dangerous by the party and allegedly took a part in the banning of the "Tiszatáj" a literary magazine in 1986. What can be certainly determined is that she worked as a censor in that capacity for György Aczél.

She was a member of the Hungarian Parliament from the 1994 parliamentary election until 2014, when she retired from politics. Since 2002, she was leader of the socialist parliamentary group. Before her election as party leader she requested that the party be led by a three-member executive committee and that Attila Mesterházy is to succeed her as the leader of the socialist faction in parliament. Lendvai led the party into the 2009 European Parliament election in June.

She resigned from her position after the worst defeat of 2010 elections. The party congress elected Attila Mesterházy to her successor on 10 July 2010.

National Assembly of Hungary
Preceded by Sándor Nagy	Leader of the MSZP parliamentary group 2002–2009	Succeeded by Attila Mesterházy
Party political offices
Preceded by Ferenc Gyurcsány	Chairperson of the Hungarian Socialist Party; 2009–2010	Succeeded by Attila Mesterházy
