= Sándor Nagy (politician) =

Hungarian politician and economist (1946–2015)

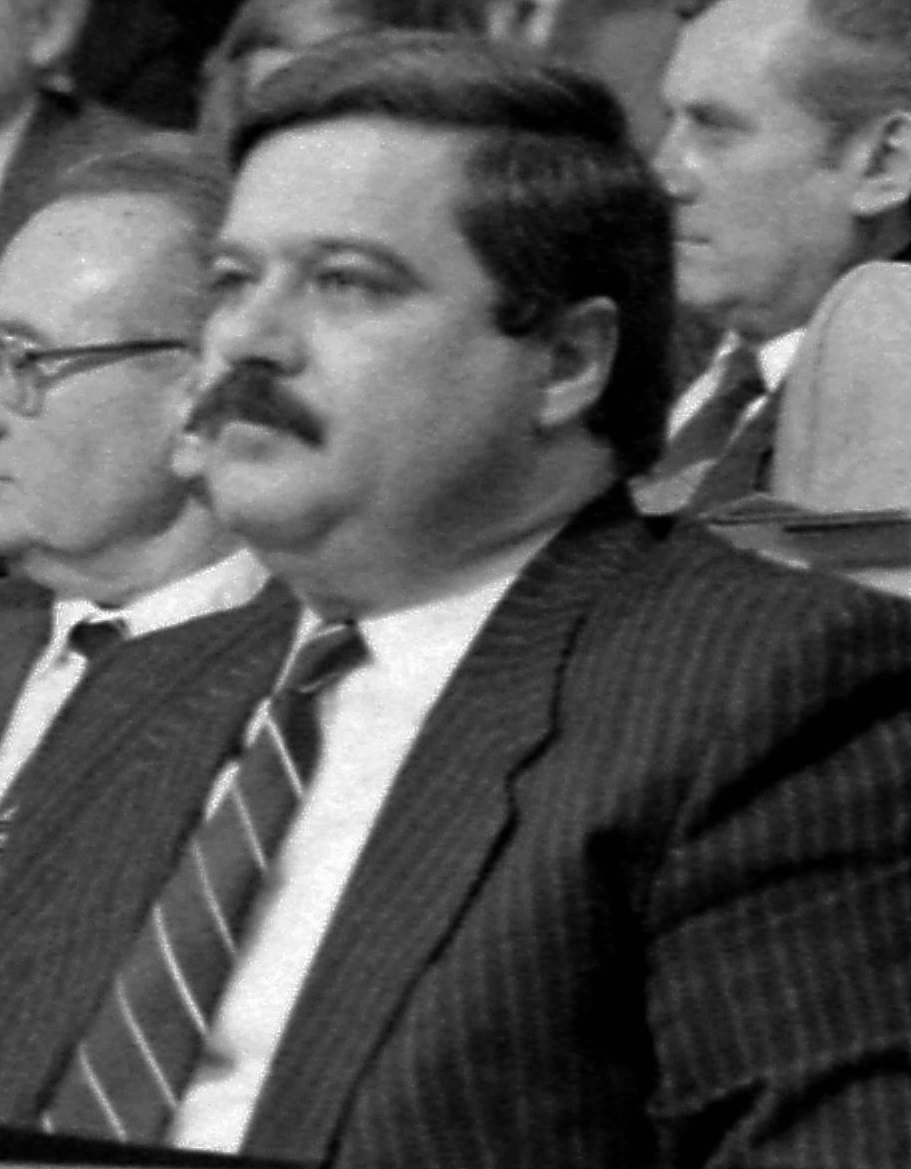
- Sándor Nagy in 1989

Member of the National Assembly
- In office 28 June 1994 – 15 May 2006
- In office 5 October 1988 – 1 May 1990
- In office 27 June 1980 – 27 June 1985

Personal details
- Born: 2 November 1946 Vértes, Hungary
- Died: 24 August 2015 (aged 68) Budapest, Hungary
- Party: MSZMP (1966–1989); MSZP (1994–2015)
- Children: Sándor; Zoltán
- Profession: trade unionist, politician

Sándor Nagy (2 November 1946 – 24 August 2015) was a Hungarian trade unionist and politician, Member of Parliament from 1980 to 1985 (representing Kaposvár), 1988 to 1990 (MSZMP) and 1994 to 2006 (MSZP). He was leader of the Socialists' parliamentary group between 1 January 2001 and 14 May 2002. He served as Political State Secretary of the Prime Minister's Office from 2002 to 2006.

In 1980, he was delegated to the Presidential Council of the Hungarian People's Republic. In May 1988, he was elected member to the Central Committee of the ruling communist Socialist Workers' Party. Following the end of communism, he was President of the National Confederation of Hungarian Trade Unions (MSzOSz) between 1990 and 1995.

Before the 2002 parliamentary election, Nagy was one of the four Socialist candidates for the position of Prime Minister of Hungary. Later Nagy, alongside Miklós Németh withdrew from nomination and the MSZP's congress elected Péter Medgyessy as candidate, who finally won the election and became prime minister.

== Personal life ==
He was married and had two sons, Sándor and Zoltán.

== Death ==
Nagy died on 24 August 2015 at the age of 68, following a short illness.

National Assembly of Hungary
Preceded by László Kovács	Leader of the MSZP parliamentary group 2001–2002	Succeeded by Ildikó Lendvai
