= Gyula Horn =

Hungarian politician (1932–2013)

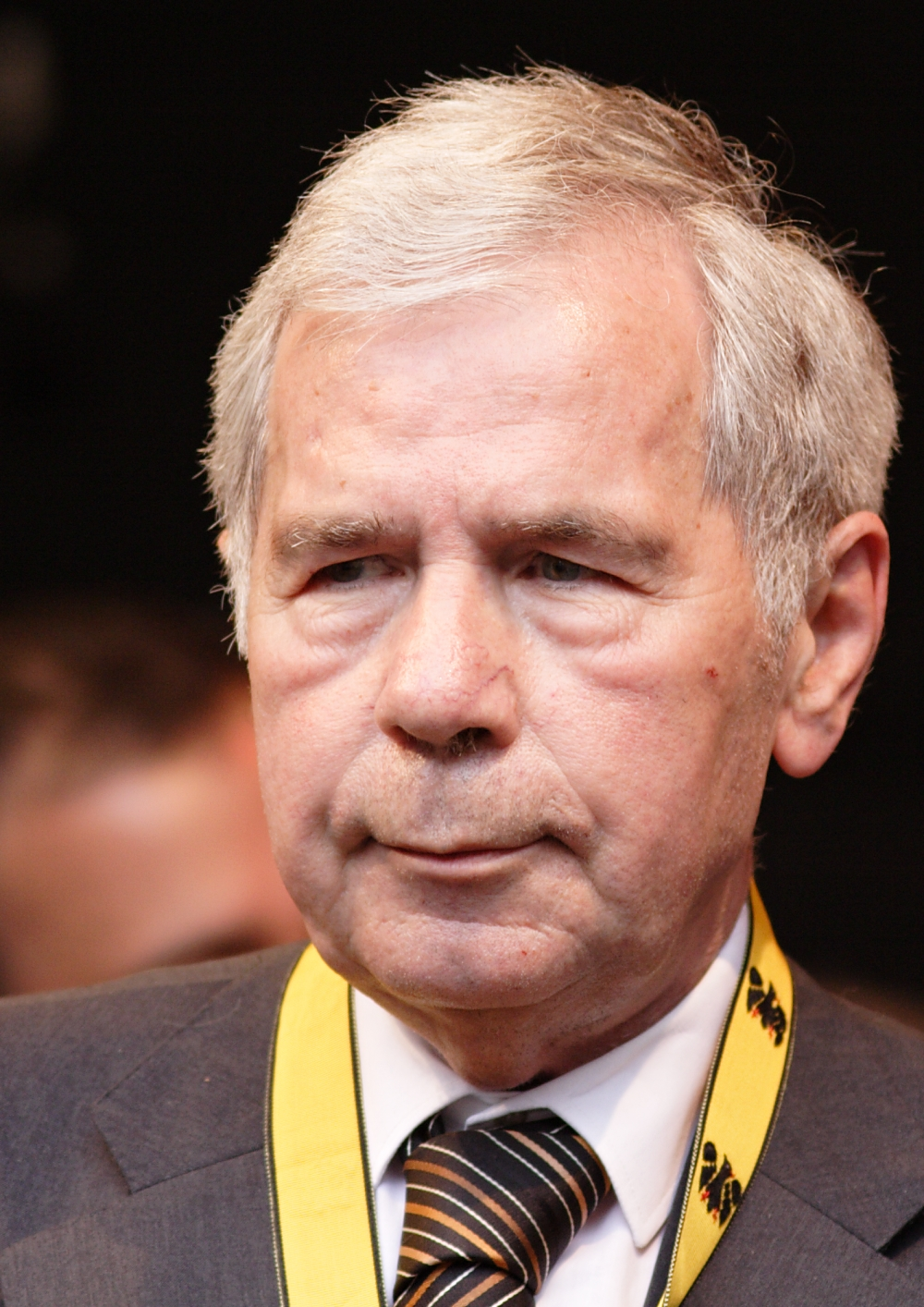
- Horn in 2007

Prime Minister of Hungary
- In office 15 July 1994 – 6 July 1998
- President: Árpád Göncz
- Preceded by: Péter Boross
- Succeeded by: Viktor Orbán

Member of the National Assembly
- In office 2 May 1990 – 13 May 2010

Minister of Foreign Affairs
- In office 10 May 1989 – 23 May 1990
- Prime Minister: Miklós Németh
- Preceded by: Péter Várkonyi
- Succeeded by: Géza Jeszenszky

Personal details
- Born: Gyula János Horn; 5 July 1932 Budapest, Hungary
- Died: 19 June 2013 (aged 80) Budapest, Hungary
- Party: MSZP (1989–2013)
- Other political affiliations: MDP (1954–1956); MSZMP (1956–1989)
- Spouse: Anna Király
- Children: 2
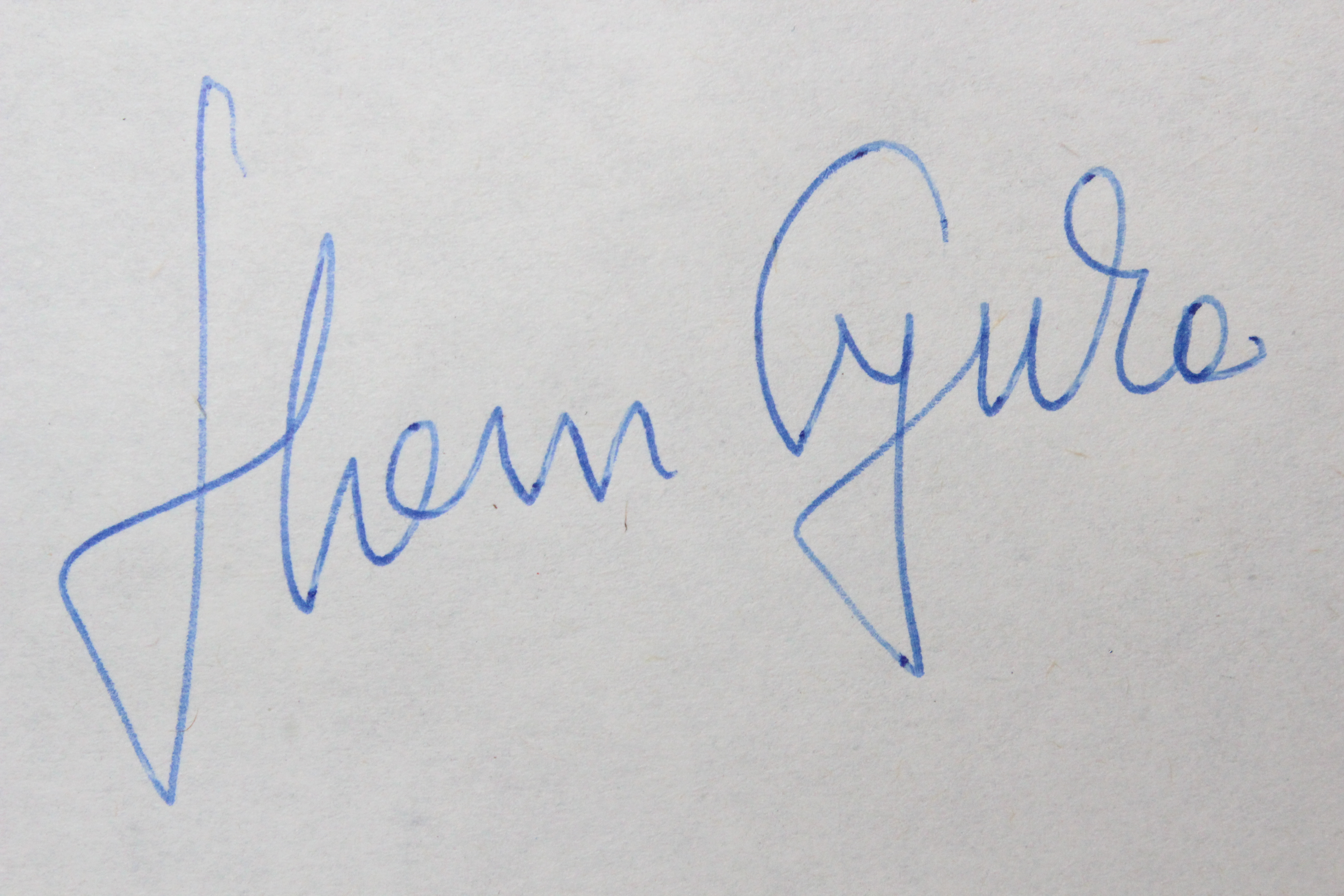
- Signature

Gyula János Horn (5 July 1932 – 19 June 2013) was a Hungarian politician who was the Prime Minister of Hungary from 1994 to 1998.

Horn was the last Communist Minister of Foreign Affairs of Hungary. He played a major role in demolishing the "Iron Curtain" for East Germans in 1989, contributing to the later unification of Germany. During his premiership, he launched the Bokros package, the biggest fiscal austerity programme in post-communist Hungary, in 1995.

== Early life and education ==
Horn was born in Budapest in 1932 as the third child of transport worker Géza Horn who was of Jewish background and factory worker Anna Csörnyei. He was brought up in a Lutheran household. They lived in conditions of poverty at the so-called "Barrack" estate between Nagyicce and Sashalom. There were seven brothers in the family: filmmaker Géza (1925–1956), Károly (1930–1946), Tibor (1935), Sándor (1939), Tamás (1942) and Dénes (1944).

After the German occupation of Hungary, his father was kidnapped by the Gestapo due to communist activities in 1944 and never returned. Gyula Horn's niece is Szófia Havas (b. Szófia Horn, 1955), Member of Parliament between 2006 and 2010, whose father Géza, Jr. was killed under unclear circumstances during the 1956 revolution.

He first studied in a lower technicians' school in Hungary. He graduated from the Rostov-on-Don College of Economics and Finance in 1954. He finished the political academy of the Hungarian Socialist Workers' Party (MSZMP) in 1970. He received Candidate of Economic Sciences in 1977.

He married statistician Anna Király in February 1956 and had two children: Anna (1956) and Gyula, Jr. (1969).

== In politics (1954–1994) ==
In 1954 Horn joined the Hungarian communist party, then called the Hungarian Working People's Party (MDP). In November 1956, he helped reorganize the MDP into the Hungarian Socialist Workers' Party (MSZMP), which under the leadership of János Kádár crushed the 1956 Hungarian revolution against Soviet occupation and communist rule.

Horn worked in the Ministry of Finance from 1954 to 1959. He got a job in the Foreign Ministry in 1959, first as an official in the independent Soviet department. In the 1960s he was a diplomat in the Hungarian embassies in Bulgaria and Yugoslavia.

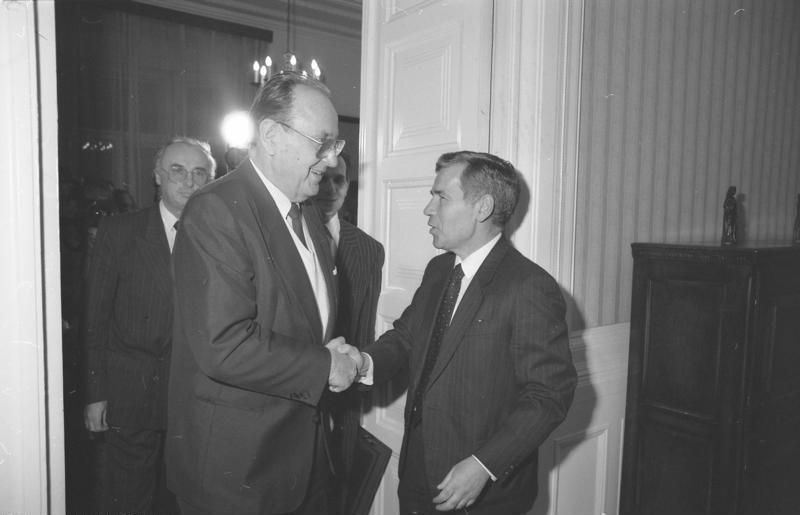
Gyula Horn with West German Foreign Minister Hans-Dietrich Genscher in 1989

In 1969 Horn became an official in the foreign affairs department of the MSZMP Central Committee. By 1983 he rose to the rank of department head. In 1985 he was appointed secretary of state (deputy minister) in the Foreign Ministry. In 1989 he stepped forward to become foreign minister in the country's last communist government led by Miklós Németh. By this time, Horn had become a prominent member of the party's reformist wing, which wanted to jettison the goulash Communism of Kádár in favour of Western-style democracy and a market economy.

As a minister he was in charge of foreign affairs when Hungary decided to open the western border (the "Iron Curtain") to East Germans wishing to emigrate to West Germany. He is often credited with having a major part in the decision and, consequently, a role in German unification.

He and his Austrian counterpart Alois Mock posed for cameras on 27 June 1989 to cut through a barbed wire frontier fence, in a largely symbolic act of rapprochement which had been planned months before. As foreign minister he ordered the border to be opened to allow East Germans gathered in Hungary by the thousands to cross into Austria, and from there to West Germany. With this act he greatly contributed to the later unification of Germany. Within weeks tens of thousands of East Germans, who travelled to Hungary with "tourist" visas, headed straight for the unfortified border and walked into the West. Horn outraged his East German counterparts when he told them that international treaties on refugees took precedence over a 1969 agreement between Budapest and East Berlin limiting freedom of movement. The fall of East German communism and the process of German unification had been launched. With dizzying speed, communist governments in the region succumbed to popular uprisings and sheer fatigue. Within a few years, the Soviet Union itself had evaporated.

Horn helped lead the transformation of the MSZMP into the Hungarian Socialist Party later in 1989. As foreign minister he prepared and signed the Hungarian-Soviet troop withdrawal agreement in March 1990. Among the politicians of the transitional era, including representatives of civil opposition, he was the first in Hungary who raised and suggested the issue of possible membership in NATO and the European Union.

He was elected to Parliament in 1990 and retained a seat until the 2010 parliamentary election. The Socialists were roundly defeated in that election, taking only 33 seats. He served as Chairman of the Parliamentary Committee on Foreign Affairs between 1990 and 1993, until his resignation. Also in 1990, he succeeded Rezső Nyers as chairman of the Socialist Party.

Between 1990 and 1995, he was a member of the Governing Board of the Stockholm International Peace Research Institute (SIPRI). He also functioned as one of the vice presidents of the Socialist International from 1996 to 2003.

== Prime Minister (1994–1998) ==
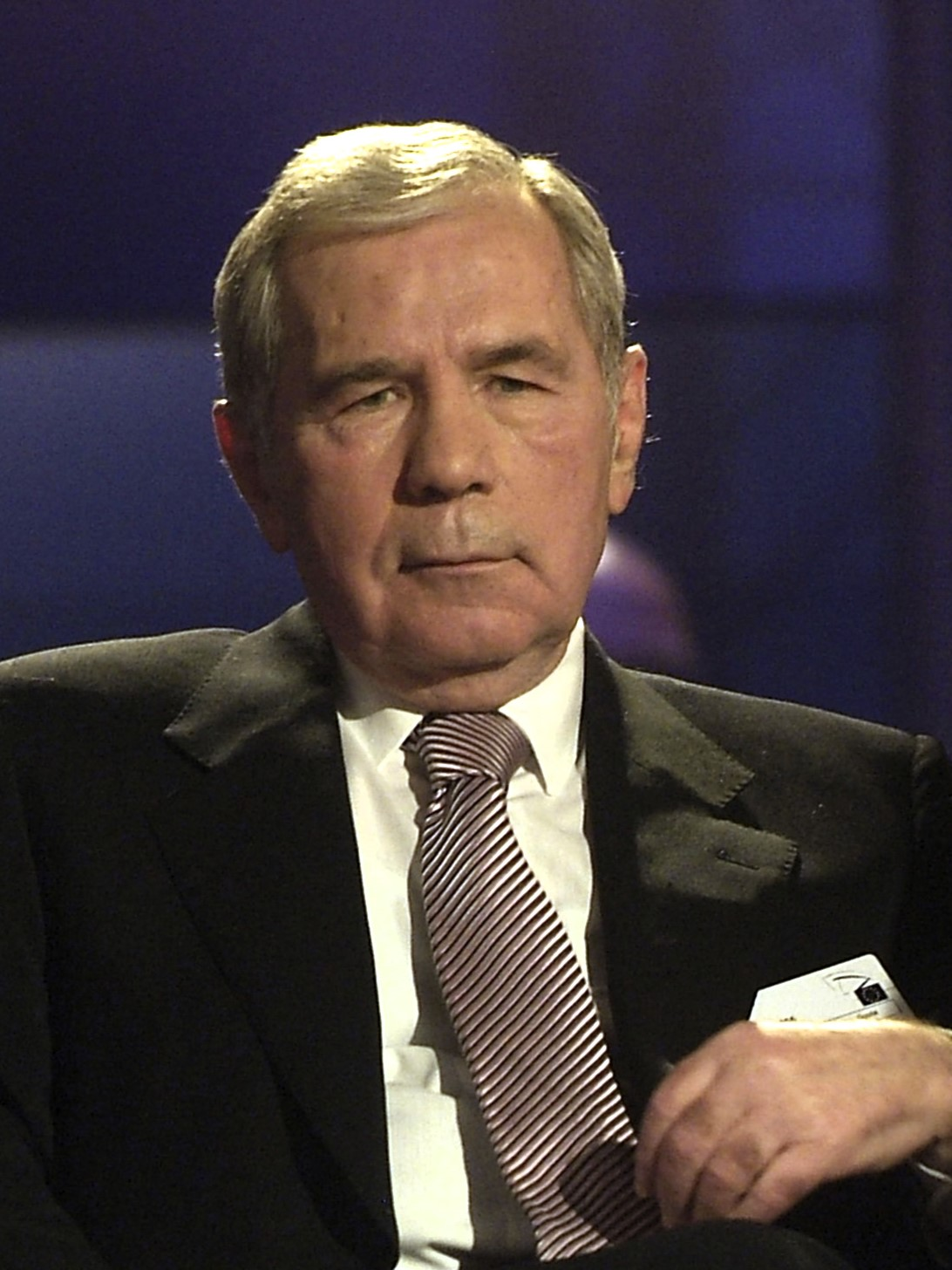
- Premiership of Gyula Horn; 15 July 1994 – 6 July 1998
- President: Árpád Göncz
- Cabinet: Horn Government
- Party: MSZP
- Election: 1994 Hungarian parliamentary election

Horn led the Socialists to a comprehensive victory in the 1994 parliamentary election. The MSZP leaped from a paltry 33 seats in 1990 to 209, at the time the second-most that a Hungarian party has ever won in a free election. The size of the MSZP landslide took even Horn by surprise. Although the Socialists had more than enough seats to govern alone, Horn suspected he would have trouble getting needed reforms past his own party's left wing. He also wanted to allay concerns both inside and outside Hungary of a former Communist party winning an absolute majority. With this in mind, he went into coalition with the liberal Alliance of Free Democrats, giving him a two-thirds majority. A few days before election day, Horn and his convoy suffered a major car accident between Emőd and Nyékládháza on the way back from a campaign closing event from Miskolc; Horn suffered a cervical fracture and was forced to wear a halo brace for months.

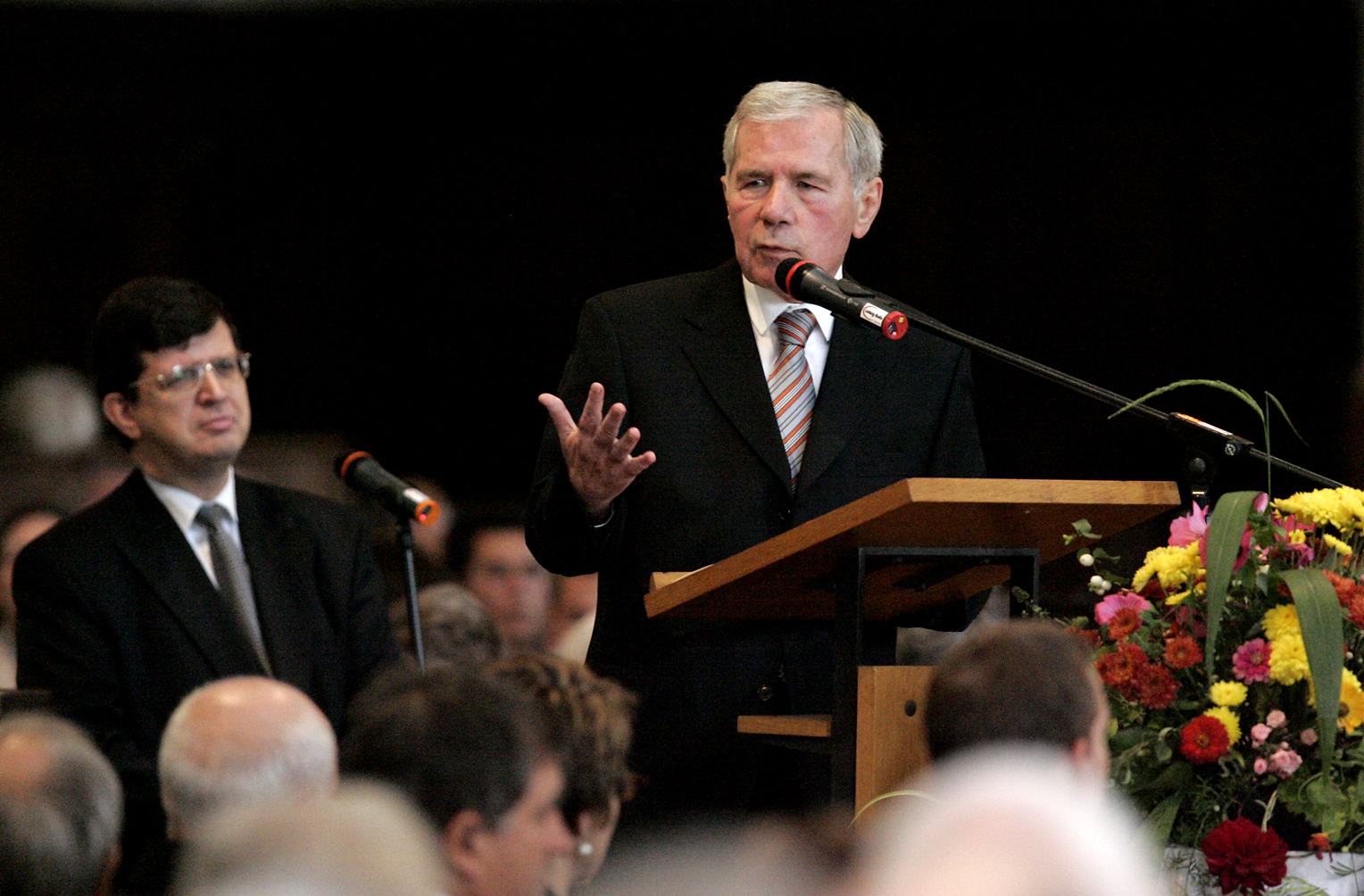
Gyula Horn in 2005

In 1995, Horn's government enacted the "Bokros package", a major austerity program. This was a difficult decision for a social democratic party, and Horn had to expend considerable effort to get most of his party to agree to it.

Although Horn relinquished leadership of the party after the Socialists lost the 1998 election to Viktor Orbán and Fidesz, he was for a long time considered to have considerable influence in the party, partly because of his personal popularity among elderly voters. However, after 2002 he went into semi-retirement. The Medgyessy Cabinet appointed him Special Rapporteur for the European Union. He received second place in the election list of the MSZP during the 2004 European Parliament election in Hungary, however Horn stated before the election that would not become an MEP.

Horn has received several awards for his achievements in foreign relations, among others the Charlemagne Award of the city of Aachen in 1990. He did not, however, get the Civil Division of the Order of Merit of the Republic of Hungary in 2007, suggested by Ferenc Gyurcsány, as it was refused by Hungarian President László Sólyom, who explicitly stated Horn's views on the 1956 revolution as the reason.

According to a survey in 2011, Viktor Orbán was found to be Hungary's best prime minister since the transition to democracy, József Antall, the head of the first democratically elected government between 1990 and 1993, came second while Horn and Gordon Bajnai (2009–10) tied for the third place.

== Role in the 1956 Hungarian Revolution ==
Although the fiscal austerity package under his rule eroded his popularity heavily, the most controversial part of his life is his role after the 1956 revolution, which started on 23 October and was crushed in the days following 4 November.

At the end of October he joined the National Guard, the armed body of the revolution consisting of soldiers, policemen, and civic freedom fighters. In December he joined the "pufajkás" brigades (in German Steppjackenbrigade), a communist paramilitary body set up to help the invading Soviet troops restore the communist regime, and he served there until June 1957. His alleged role is controversial in some circles because such squads were accused of involvement in torturing, harassing and even executing civilians during and after the uprising.

According to him, his elder brother was killed by the revolutionists during the uprising. However, his brother's death certificate states that he died in a traffic accident in the countryside. His daughter was born on 30 October. "The conditions were bad. The uprising released many criminals who endangered public safety. In the pufajkás squad, I defended the legal order," he told German paper Die Welt 50 years later. "First, I would like to make it clear that 1956 was not a fight against communism. Even the rebels did not want to wipe it out. This is incorrectly depicted today."

Horn's precise role in crushing the revolution is unclear as the reports of his brigade have gaps; however, in 1957 he received the award "For the Worker-Peasant Power", which was only granted to those whose services earned satisfaction. After becoming prime minister, when questioned and criticized over this part of his life, he only said: "I was a pufajkás. So what?"

== Illness and death ==
In August 2007, Horn was taken to hospital with severe disease. Reportedly he was treated at Honvéd Hospital of Budapest for a sleeping disorder, but other sources told he had a serious brain malformation. Later reported his condition worsened so much that he could not leave the hospital, and thus missed the World Political Forum which was held in Budapest, where former Soviet leader Mikhail Gorbachev also participated.

On 9 October 2007, Hungarian daily newspaper Népszabadság's online version reported mistakenly that Horn had died.

By 2008, Horn was no longer able to recognise his family members and friends as he suffered from an illness similar to Alzheimer's disease. There were also reports that Horn was in good physical condition despite the fact that he had lost significant weight. Prime Minister Ferenc Gyurcsány was one of the last senior party officials, who visited him then. On 5 July 2011, Horn's 79th birthday Népszava reported his health condition had not deteriorated but also not improved, remained stable. During this time influential MSZP leaders gave a toast to Horn on the occasion of his birthday.

On his 80th birthday on 5 July 2012, Prime Minister Viktor Orbán greeted him in a letter. He wrote, "first of all we are Hungarians and we work towards prosperity of the nation based on our faith and the best of our knowledge. Therefore there are more links than divisions between us". The Hungarian Socialist Party also celebrated his round birthday.

After years of struggling with his illness, he died on 19 June 2013. He was survived by his wife and daughter, Anna, and son, Gyula Jr.

Germany's Foreign Minister, Guido Westerwelle, said Horn's "courageous work as Hungarian foreign minister will remain unforgettable to us Germans." Reuters called Horn, whose picture taking a wire-cutter to the fence separating Hungary and Austria was iconic, the "man who tore the iron curtain". Domestic recognition was hampered by his communist history, and commendations voted on by the Hungarian parliament were defeated on the occasions of his 70th and 75th birthdays.

Attila Mesterházy, chairman of the Hungarian Socialist Party, sent a statement to news agency Magyar Távirati Iroda (MTI) in which he wrote that "Horn will be remembered as the most defining leaders of the modern Hungarian left, one of the most successful prime ministers of Hungary and had made one of the greatest impacts on Europe during its sweeping changes over two decades ago. Horn played a key role in reviving the left and the Socialist party." Former PM Gyurcsány called Horn the "most contradictory" and "most talented" of politicians, and added in his Facebook entry: "a great man has passed away."

The government party Fidesz expressed condolences to Horn's family and leadership of the Hungarian Socialist party. Politics Can Be Different's co-chair András Schiffer told MTI that "Horn was one of the most important personalities of the post-communist Hungary and is one of the few politicians whose names are likely to go down in Hungarian history." Schiffer said that "he could not identify with Horn's politics and political relations before the transition to democracy in Hungary, but it must be acknowledged that Horn had shown real humanity towards ordinary people." Gordon Bajnai, leader of the Together 2014, said that Hungary and Europe lost a "true statesman". He added that Horn was a "symbol of a peaceful and successful regime change, and, as prime minister, he had done much to help Hungary find an exit from the post-communist economic and social crisis." President János Áder also sent his condolences to Horn's widow and children.

=== Funeral ===
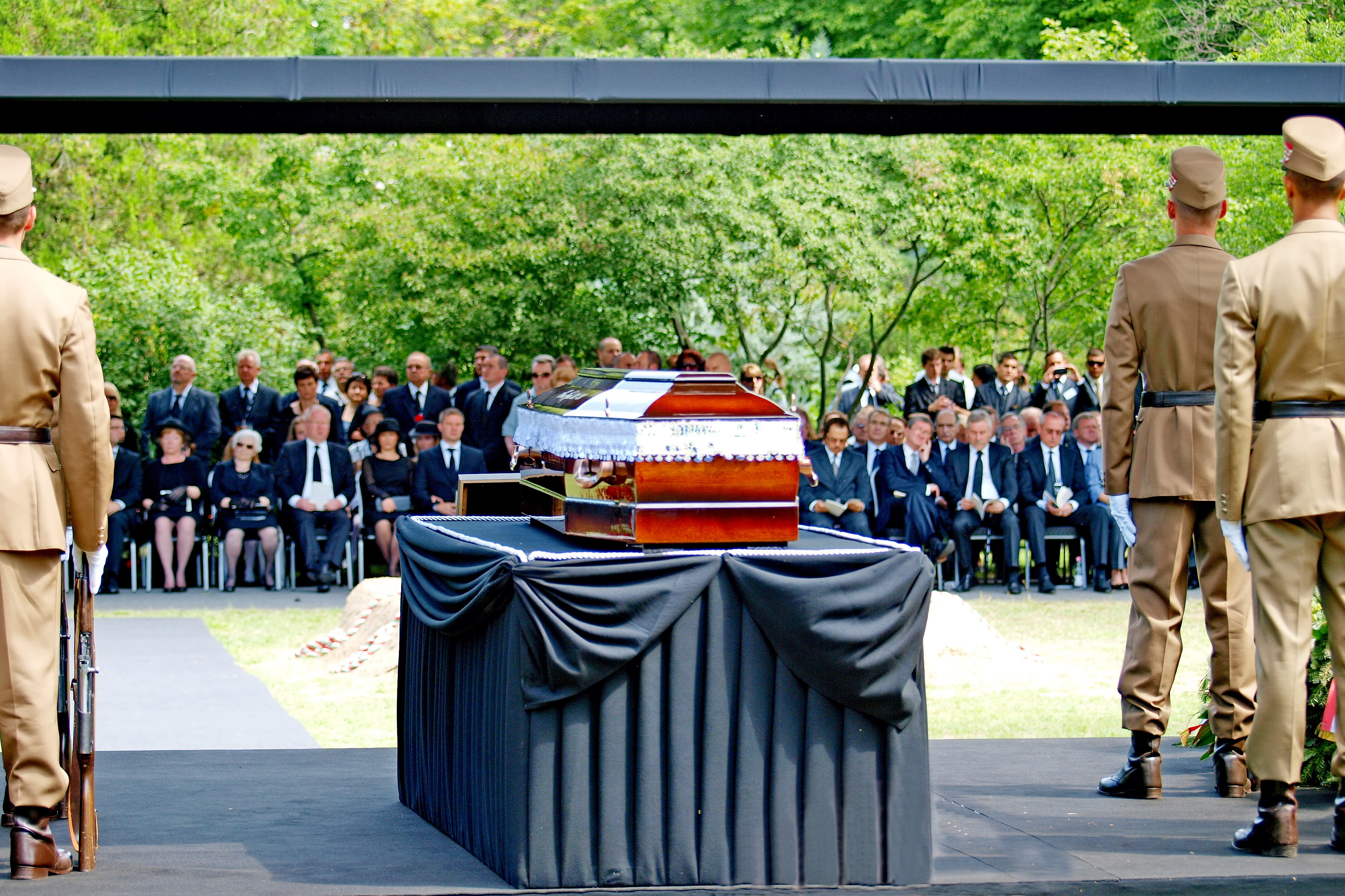
Funeral of Gyula Horn

Horn received a state funeral with military honors and was buried at Fiume Road National Graveyard on 8 July 2013. Thousands of people attended the funeral, many of whom laid red carnations beside the grave. European Parliament President Martin Schulz, former German Foreign Minister Hans-Dietrich Genscher, Hungarian President János Áder, former head of states László Sólyom and Pál Schmitt, Archbishop Péter Erdő and former house speaker Katalin Szili were also among the attendance, as well as representatives of the main parliamentary parties.

Prime Minister Viktor Orbán, former prime ministers Péter Boross, Péter Medgyessy, Ferenc Gyurcsány and Gordon Bajnai, as well as party chairman Attila Mesterházy paid tribute to Horn. When Orbán bowed his head, some in the crowd booed at the prime minister. Socialist lawmaker Ferenc Baja, a former minister in the Horn government, said in a Facebook entry that this was derogative to the event.

Béla Katona, who served as Speaker of the National Assembly from 2009 to 2010, said the "life of Gyula Horn itself encompassed the history of the twentieth century" and he shaped the "fate of both Hungary and Europe as a whole." Katona told "Horn as a prime minister and a statesman remained an ordinary man nevertheless. He was not perfect, he made some bad decisions, but the good decisions outnumbered the bad ones. He was a successful man and a true statesman".

== Selected publications ==
- Baranyi, Mária: Egy előszoba titkai – Horn Gyula közelről 1994–1998. Athenaeum Könyvkiadó, Budapest, 2010.
- Horn, Gyula: Cölöpök. Zenit Könyvek, Budapest, 1991.
- Horn, Gyula: Azok a kilencvenes évek.... Kossuth Kiadó, Budapest, 1999.
- Kubinyi, Ferenc: Vaskorona. Edition Litfas, 1995.
- Pünkösti, Árpád: A Horn. Angyalföldtől a pártelnökségig 1932–1990. Kossuth Kiadó, Budapest, 2013.
- Szerdahelyi, Szabolcs: Hiányzó cölöpök – Ami a Horn Gyula életrajzból kimaradt. Kairosz Kiadó, Budapest, 2002.

Political offices
Preceded by Péter Várkonyi	Minister of Foreign Affairs; 1989–1990	Succeeded by Géza Jeszenszky
Preceded by Péter Boross	Prime Minister of Hungary; 1994–1998	Succeeded by Viktor Orbán
Party political offices
Preceded by Rezső Nyers	Chairman of the Hungarian Socialist Party; 1990–1998	Succeeded by László Kovács
