= Modern Hungary Movement =

Modern Hungary Movement Modern Magyarország Mozgalom
- Leader: Lajos Bokros
- Founded: 21 April 2013
- Dissolved: 1 May 2019
- Headquarters: 1036 Budapest; Lajos utca 107. II/10.
- Ideology: Liberal conservatism Pro-Europeanism
- Political position: Centre-right

Party flag

Website
- www.moma.hu

The Modern Hungary Movement (Hungarian: Modern Magyarország Mozgalom, pronounced [ˈmodɛrn ˈmɒɟɒrorsaːɡ ˈmozɡɒlom]), abbreviated to MoMa, was a liberal conservative political party in Hungary. Founded by former Finance Minister Lajos Bokros MEP on 21 April 2013, MoMa stood for free market, liberal values and champions "individual freedom, the free market, and the freedom of private and intellectual property".

The party claimed to be modelled on the Conservative Party in the United Kingdom.

== History ==
MoMa decided not to participate in the 2014 parliamentary election, because "they do not want to weaken the cooperation of left-wing parties with separate candidates." Bokros criticized and resented that his party were excluded from the alliance. Later MoMa formally asked its supporters to vote Unity in the 2014 general election, after receiving constitutional guarantees from the left-wing opposition.

The party planned to run in the 2014 European Parliament election, however its registration was refused by the National Election Office (NVI). As a result Bokros lost his European Parliament mandate. Bokros also ran for Mayor of Budapest in the 2014 municipal election. On 29 September 2014, two other candidates, the independent György Magyar and candidate of the leftist opposition parties' Ferenc Falus withdrew from the election and supported Bokros. Bokros received 36.04% of the vote and came second after István Tarlós. He was supported by Together, the Democratic Coalition and the Budapest branch of the Hungarian Socialist Party.

In September 2017, the MoMa made an electoral coalition with the Democratic Coalition (DK) for the 2018 parliamentary election. In the same time Bokros announced his "500 days programme" which contained the short-lived inevitable cooperation of the "democratic opposition parties" after the victory to "restore democracy" and "break down the Orbán regime". Bokros argued another by-election is required after the successful restoration. In January 2018, Bokros announced the DK has not kept its promise and rejected the agreement; as a result, the MoMa aimed to participate in the election individually. DK issued a statement saying, Bokros refused their "fair offer" to provide a single mandate for his party with "not measurable support". While Bokros and some others withdrew their candidacy in favor of the parliamentary opposition, ten candidates of the MoMa ran in the 2018 national election, thus the party was not able to set a national list. They altogether obtained 617 votes.

Lajos Bokros announced the disestablishment of the Modern Hungary Movement on 23 April 2019 with effect from 1 May. He said the delegation members decided to dissolve the party on their last meeting on 15 March. Bokros argued "he main reason for this is that we no longer see the point of serving as a scenario for the weak opposition activity that, under the pressure of arbitrariness, had mostly degenerated into the "Hunger Games".

== Election results ==
For the Hungarian Parliament:

Election year	National Assembly				Government
Election year	# of overall votes	% of overall vote	# of overall seats won	+/–	Government
2018	617	0.01%	0 / 199		extra-parliamentary
