= Lajos Faluvégi =

Hungarian politician

Minister of Finance of Hungary
- In office 12 May 1971 – 27 June 1980
- Prime Minister: Jenő Fock; György Lázár
- Preceded by: Péter Vályi
- Succeeded by: István Hetényi

Personal details
- Born: 22 October 1924 Mátraderecske, Kingdom of Hungary
- Died: 5 December 1999 (aged 75) Budapest, Hungary
- Party: MDP, MSZMP
- Profession: politician, economist

Lajos Faluvégi (22 October 1924 – 5 December 1999) was a Hungarian politician, who served as Minister of Finance between 1971 and 1980.

He attended the Karl Marx University of Economic Sciences. From 1945 he served as head of a department for the Ministry of Finance. Between 1968 and 1971 he was the Deputy Minister of Finance, after that he was appointed Minister of Finance, a position he held until 1980. He was the first who called attention to the public debt. Between 1980 and 1986 he served as Deputy Prime Minister and as chairman of the National Planning Board. Faluvégi retired in 1987. He was the chairman of the Council of Stock Exchange from May 1989 to June 1990. He was member of the Budapest Stock Exchange's Control Committee between 1990 and 1993.

Political offices
| Preceded by Péter Vályi | Minister of Finance; 1971–1980 | Succeeded by István Hetényi |
