= Ferenc Gyurcsány =

Prime Minister of Hungary from 2004 to 2009

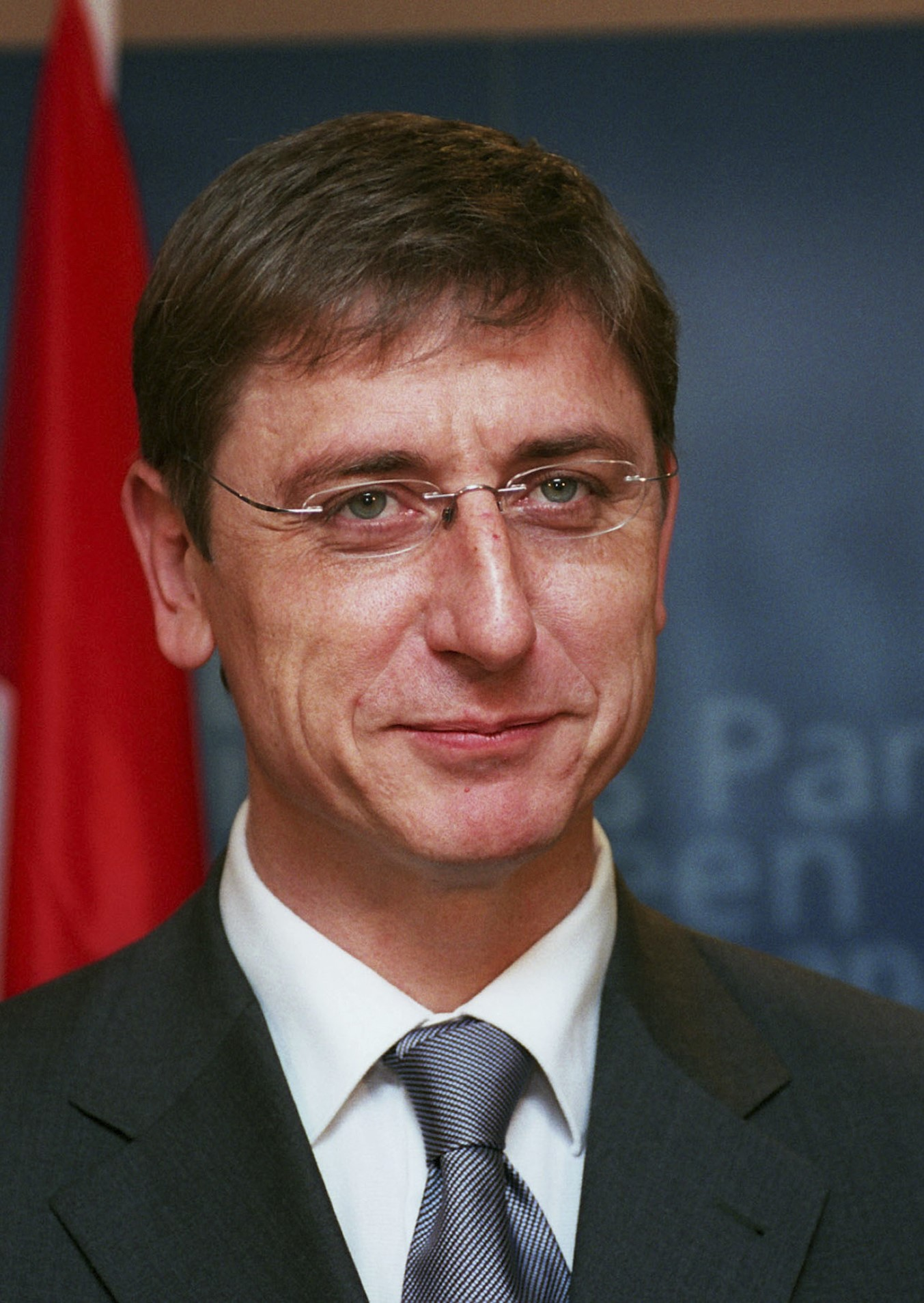
- Gyurcsány in 2012

Prime Minister of Hungary
- In office 29 September 2004 – 14 April 2009
- President: Ferenc Mádl; László Sólyom
- Preceded by: Péter Medgyessy
- Succeeded by: Gordon Bajnai

President of the Democratic Coalition
- In office 22 October 2011 – 8 May 2025
- Preceded by: Party established
- Succeeded by: Klára Dobrev

President of the Hungarian Socialist Party
- In office 27 February 2007 – 5 April 2009
- Preceded by: István Hiller
- Succeeded by: Ildikó Lendvai

Minister of Youth Affairs and Sports
- In office 19 May 2003 – 4 October 2004
- Prime Minister: Péter Medgyessy; Himself
- Preceded by: György Jánosi
- Succeeded by: Kinga Göncz

Member of the National Assembly
- In office 16 May 2006 – 9 May 2025
- Constituency: National List

Personal details
- Born: 4 June 1961 (age 65) Pápa, Hungary
- Party: DK (2011–)
- Other political affiliations: KISZ (1980–1989); MSZP (2000–2011)
- Spouses: Beatrix Rozs (divorced) Edina Bognár (m. 1985, divorced) Klára Dobrev (m. 1995; div. 2025)
- Children: 5
- Education: University of Pécs
- Occupation: Entrepreneur; Politician

Ferenc Gyurcsány (Note: Hungarian pronunciation: [ˈfɛrɛnt͡s ˈɟurt͡ʃaːɲ]) (born 4 June 1961) is a Hungarian entrepreneur and retired politician who served as Prime Minister of Hungary from 2004 to 2009. Prior to that, he held the position of Minister of Youth Affairs and Sports between 2003 and 2004.

He was nominated as prime minister by the Hungarian Socialist Party (MSZP) on 25 August 2004, after Péter Medgyessy resigned due to a conflict with the Socialist Party's coalition partner. Gyurcsány was elected prime minister on 29 September 2004 in a parliamentary vote (197 yes votes, 12 no votes, with most of the opposition in Parliament not voting). He led his coalition to victory in the 2006 parliamentary election, securing another term as prime minister.

On 24 February 2007, he was elected as the leader of the MSZP, winning 89% of the vote. On 21 March 2009, Gyurcsány announced his intention to resign as prime minister. President László Sólyom stated that instead of a short-term government ruling only until the 2010 elections, early elections should be held. On 28 March 2009 Gyurcsány resigned from his position as party chairman. A minister under Gyurcsány, Gordon Bajnai, became the nominee of MSZP for the post of prime minister in March 2009 and he became prime minister on 14 April.

In October 2011, Gyurcsány and other party members quit the MSZP to establish the Democratic Coalition (DK) under his leadership. In May 2025, he announced his resignation from the leadership of the party, and also his retirement from politics, but remained a member of the party.

== Early years ==
Gyurcsány was born in Pápa, Hungary, into an impoverished middle-class family as the only son of Ferenc Gyurcsány Sr. and Katalin Varga.

He has an elder sister, Éva. According to contemporary police documents, Gyurcsány's father was convicted on charges of minor crimes (low value thefts and fraud) multiple times.

Gyurcsány attended Apáczai Csere János High School in Budapest for two years; he then returned to Pápa, Hungary and continued his studies there, at a local grammar school.

In 1979, he was admitted to the University of Pécs, where he studied as a teacher and obtained his B.Sc. in 1984, then he studied economics at the same institution, getting his degree in 1990.

In 1981, he assumed function in the KISZ, the Organisation of Young Communists, where he mostly handled organizing student programs at the beginning. Between 1984 and 1988, he was the vice president of the organisation's committee in Pécs. Then between 1988 and 1989, he was the president of the central KISZ committee of universities and colleges. After the political change in 1989, he became vice-president of the organisation's short-lived quasi successor, the Hungarian Democratic Youth Association (DEMISZ).

From 1990 onwards, he transferred from the public to the private sector. Gyurcsány then took the position of CEO at Altus Ltd., a holding company of which he was owner, from 1992 to 2002 and thereafter as chairman of the board. By 2002, he was listed as the fiftieth-richest person in Hungary.

== Return to politics ==
Gyurcsány returned to politics in 2002 as the head strategic advisor of Péter Medgyessy, the previous prime minister of Hungary. From May 2003 until September 2004 Gyurcsány was a minister responsible for sports, youth and children.

He became the president of the MSZP in Győr-Moson-Sopron county in January 2004, serving until September 2004. In the summer of that same year it seemed that there were larger problems in his relationship with Prime Minister Péter Medgyessy, so he resigned as minister. In a week, problems in the coalition led to the resignation of Medgyessy, and MSZP voted Gyurcsány to become prime minister as he was acceptable for the coalition partner, Alliance of Free Democrats (SZDSZ).

== Prime minister ==
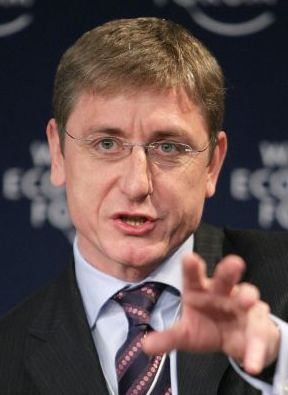
- Premiership of Ferenc Gyurcsány; 29 September 2004 – 14 April 2009
- President: Ferenc Mádl; László Sólyom
- Cabinet: First Gyurcsány Government; Second Gyurcsány Government
- Party: MSZP
- Election: 2006

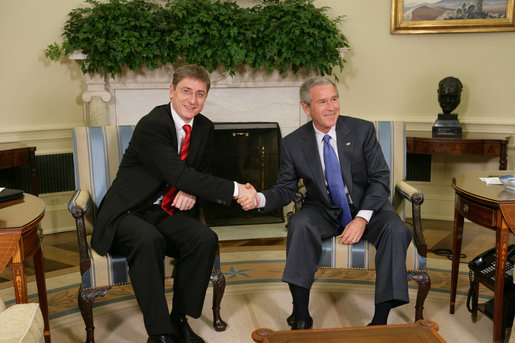
Gyurcsány with U.S. president George W. Bush in Washington, D.C., 7 October 2005

Gyurcsány was reappointed as prime minister after the 2006 parliamentary elections, with his coalition taking 210 of the available 386 parliamentary seats, and making him the first Hungarian prime minister to keep the office after a general election since 1990.

On 24 February 2007, he also became the leader of his party (being the only candidate for the post), gaining 89% of the votes.

However, soon after the election victory serious financial problems arose. His government was forced to implement austerity measures to somehow manage the budget deficit, which was much higher than expected and had grown to an almost 10% of the GDP by the end of 2006. These measures were heavily criticized by both the opposition, led by Fidesz, as being too harsh on the people, and by liberal economists, for not reducing spending enough on social benefits, including pensions.

=== Őszöd speech and protests ===
On 17 September 2006, an audio recording surfaced, allegedly from a closed-door meeting of the Prime Minister's party MSZP, held on 26 May 2006, shortly after MSZP won the election. On the recording, Gyurcsány admitted "We have obviously been lying for the last one and a half to two years." ("Nyilvánvalóan végighazudtuk az utolsó másfél-két évet.") and that "We've been lying at morning, evening, and night" ("Hazudtunk reggel, éjjel, és este."). The later-formed public consensus on the infamous "Őszöd speech" is that Gyurcsány was obviously drunk at the time and that he wasn't supposed to speak on the aforementioned closed-door meeting. Despite public outrage, the Prime Minister refused to resign, and a series of demonstrations started near the Hungarian Parliament, swelling from 2,000 to about 8,000 demonstrators calling for the resignation of Gyurcsány and his government for several weeks. The Prime Minister admitted the authenticity of the recording.

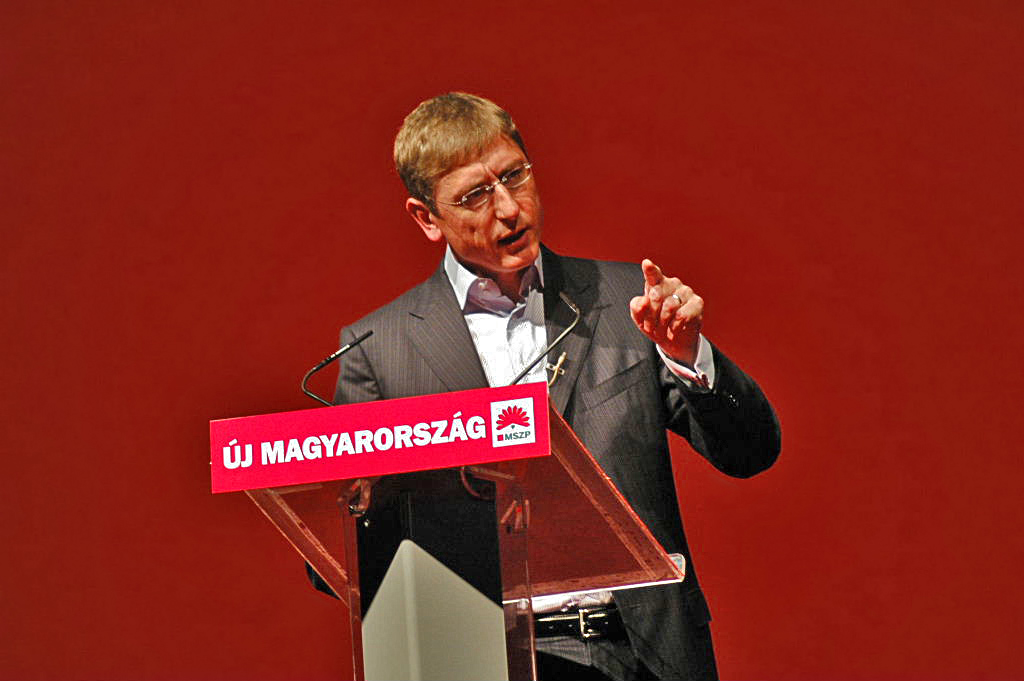
Gyurcsány at the Socialist Party's congress

On 1 October, the governing party suffered a landslide defeat in the local municipal elections. On the eve of the elections, before the results were known, President László Sólyom gave a speech in which he said that the solution to the situation is in the hands of the majority in Parliament.

=== Vote of confidence ===
As Prime Minister, Gyurcsány was a strong advocate of the South Stream pipeline project, which aimed to supply Russian gas directly to the European Union (EU), bypassing transit countries such as Ukraine. He signed the contract in Moscow just a week before the popular election in Hungary, which showed around 80% of the votes were against the government reforms.

On 6 October 2006, Gyurcsány won a vote of confidence in Parliament, 207–165, with no coalition MP voting against him. The vote was public.

=== Resignation ===
On 21 March 2009, Gyurcsány announced his intention to resign as prime minister. He stated that he was a hindrance to further economic and social reforms. Gyurcsány asked his party to find a new candidate for prime minister in two weeks. President László Sólyom stated that instead of a short-term transactional government ruling only until the 2010 elections, early elections should be held. In the search for a new prime minister, György Surányi became the frontrunner candidate for the post; however, on 26 March he pulled out of the race. On 28 March, Gyurcsány resigned from his position as party chairman.

== Career after premiership ==
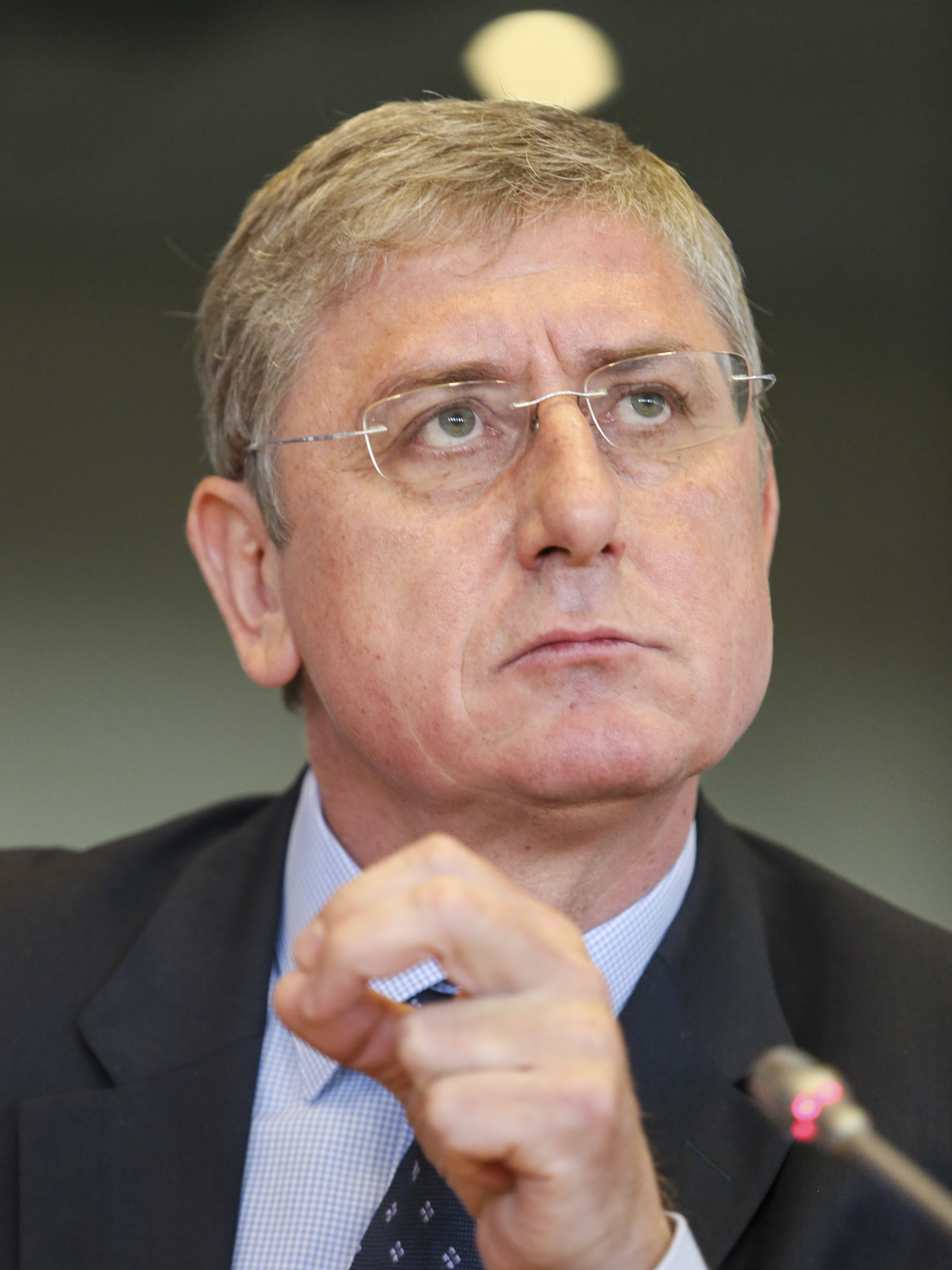
Gyurcsány in 2015

In the 2010 parliamentary elections he was elected into the Parliament still as a member of MSZP, but he became more and more critical of the party's politics. Since his attempts at reforming the party failed, he left MSZP and founded a new party, the Democratic Coalition (Demokratikus Koalíció, DK) in October 2011. As a leader of DK, he announced that his party would support Gordon Bajnai as a candidate for prime minister in 2014.

In September 2012, the ruling Fidesz proposed a voter-registration plan, which, according to the opposition, "would have restricted the right to vote". Gyurcsány and three other members of his party participated in a week-long hunger strike against the proposal. Later, in January 2013, the Constitutional Court of Hungary struck down the new electoral law as unconstitutional; after that decision, Fidesz caucus dropped the law. Gyurcsány referred to that act as his party's success.

On 14 January 2014, the Democratic Coalition and four other groups founded Unity, a political alliance with the aim of defeating Fidesz at the elections in the spring. The alliance made it into the Parliament, but only as opposition. DK won only four seats, which meant that since they were below the minimum requirements of forming a parliamentary group (five seats), its MPs (including Gyurcsány) officially count as independent politicians.

On 8 April 2018, the Democratic Coalition won nine seats, creating now a political group in the National Assembly.

In the 2019 European elections, his party got 16% of the vote and became the largest opposition party until the 2024 European elections.

On 8 May 2025, Gyurcsány announced that he would resign from the leadership of the Democratic Coalition and from his seat in parliament, and would retire from politics.

== Personal life ==
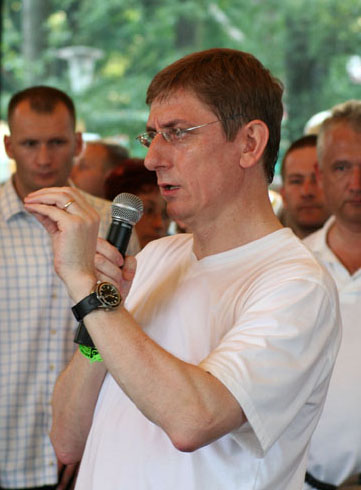
Gyurcsány at a music festival in Q&A.

Gyurcsány has been married three times. He has two sons from his second marriage with Edina Bognár, and three children from his third marriage. His spouse was Klára Dobrev, whose maternal grandfather Antal Apró was Hungary's Minister of Industry in the 1950s–60s. In May 2025, the couple announced their divorce.

He got his nickname "Fletó" (Note: Not to be confused with the Spanish word "fleto".) from his elementary school Russian language teacher.

== Criticism ==
=== Wealth ===
The origin of Gyurcsány's wealth was regularly questioned by the media and the Fidesz opposition at the time. In 2006 the weekly paper HVG wrote about a biography of Gyurcsány: "[it] concludes that talent played a greater role than corruption in Gyurcsány's success. We have to question this claim. Not just because former functionaries are massively overrepresented among Gyurcsány's business partners, but also because, despite his enormous talent for business, Gyurcsány would never have got where he is today without making use of the contacts and support base of the former state party." József Debreczeni, the biographer in question, originally reached the conclusion "regarding party connections and performance, the latter has been more important".

In 2005, MP Péter Szijjártó (of Fidesz, an opposition party at that time), as the head of a committee set up to investigate the origins of Gyurcsány's wealth, stated in his report that one of Gyurcsány's companies leased the former vacation site of the Hungarian government in Balatonőszöd and rented the site back to a state-owned company so that the rent paid by the government covered exactly the leasing fee during the first two and a half years of the ten-year lease term (1994–2004).

A person named "Gyurcsányi" was mentioned by Attila Kulcsár, the main defendant in a high-profile "K&H Equities" money laundering scandal in Hungary. The prime minister denied he had any connections with the case.

=== Plagiarism controversy ===
In an article published on 2 April 2012, Pécsi Újság called into question whether Gyurcsány submitted a diploma thesis. István Geresdi, Dean of the Faculty of Sciences at the University of Pécs told Pécsi Újság that they were unable to find Gyurcsány's diploma thesis. He further added that Gyurcsány's thesis was the only missing work from that time period. On 3 April Gyurcsány published a page from his course record book that stated that he submitted and defended a college thesis. He also stated that he did not know where his own copy of his thesis was, but he would make efforts to locate and publish it. After two weeks, on 13 April he announced that he failed to find his copy of the thesis. On 27 April Hír TV, a government-leaning television channel announced that they have found evidence that Szabolcs Rozs, who was Gyurcsány's brother-in-law in 1984, submitted a college thesis at the same college and department as Gyurcsány, with a title identical to Gyurcsány's work, in 1980. Three days later, on 30 April Hír Tv announced that they have located and compared the reviews of both Rozs's and Gyurcsány's work, and found that based on the common errors and omissions, the two texts are likely to be identical, supporting the allegations of plagiarism.

=== Other ===
On 2 September 2004, he said in the Hungarian national television: "Who has a two-room-apartment, would in general deserve three; who has three, four; who has four, a house. Who has an eld..., olderly, elderly?... olderly [struggling with an unintended portmanteau] wife, a younger one; who has a badly behaved kid, a well-behaved. Of course, he would deserve." This triggered outrage from feminist organisations, women in general, and the opposition.

On 2 February 2005, at the birthday party of the Hungarian Socialist Party, for the sake of a joke, Gyurcsány referred to the players of the Saudi national football team as terrorists. Later he apologized, but the kingdom recalled its ambassador from Hungary for a time.

During the 2006 general election campaign, a video appeared where Gyurcsány danced as Hugh Grant in Love Actually. According to government officials, the spokesperson of the government asked Gyurcsány to dance, as they re-made most parts of the film as a special gift for the wedding of spokesman András Batiz. Opposition claimed that the video was made public on purpose, as part of the election campaign, to gain popularity for the PM among young adults.

After his return to politics, Gyurcsány was at first tight-lipped on his religious affiliation, leading many to assume that he is an atheist. In an interview aired on TV2 during the 2006 parliamentary election campaign, Gyurcsány said that as a teenager, he "took part in confirmation for about two years" and even considered becoming a priest. Since confirmation can only be taken once, some regarded this claim as a giveaway that he was not telling the truth, while others such as Catholic bishop Endre Gyulay supposed he meant he took part in preparations for a confirmation.

In connection with the unrest fuelled by his speech, he has been criticised in The Economist for "turning a blind eye to police brutality".

On 13 January 2009, Dominique Strauss-Kahn, the managing director of the International Monetary Fund, travelled to Budapest to ask Gyurcsány about their agreement made in October, regarding the stabilization of Hungarian government spending.

His legitimacy was often questioned by opposition parties based on his withholding of information about the actual budget deficit in his 2006 re-election campaign.

=== Russia pipeline ===
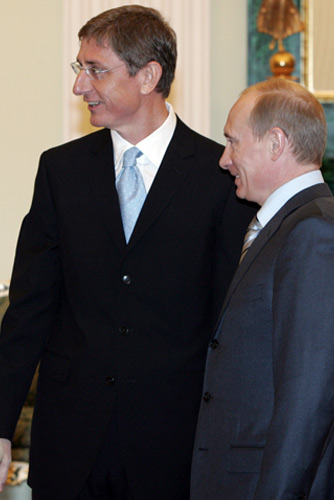
Gyurcsány (left) and Putin (right) in February 2008

As a prime minister, Gyurcsány was said to be an advocate of the South Stream pipeline project, which is aimed to supply Russian gas directly to the EU, bypassing transit countries such as Ukraine. He signed the contract in Moscow just week before a referendum in Hungary, which showed around 80% of the votes were against the government reforms. However, the questions of the referendum (two concerning health care and one concerning education) had no relation to the issue of possible pipelines built in the country. Gyurcsány stated that it is an unlucky situation for a country to have only one supplier (Russia) of any resource, which in this particular case is natural gas. He said the South Stream pipeline only diversifies routes from the same source country. He also advocated the Nabucco pipeline which was planned to transfer gas from the Middle East.

== Notes ==
Political offices
Preceded by György Jánosi	Minister of Youth Affairs and Sports; 2003–2004	Succeeded by Kinga Göncz
Preceded by Péter Medgyessy	Prime Minister of Hungary; 2004–2009	Succeeded by Gordon Bajnai
Party political offices
Preceded by István Hiller	Chairman of the Hungarian Socialist Party; 2007–2009	Succeeded by Ildikó Lendvai
New political party	Chairman of the Democratic Coalition; 2011–2025	Succeeded by Klára Dobrev
National Assembly of Hungary
New parliamentary group	Leader of the DK parliamentary group 2018–2025	Succeeded by László Sebián-Petrovszki
