= List of awards and honors received by Katalin Karikó =

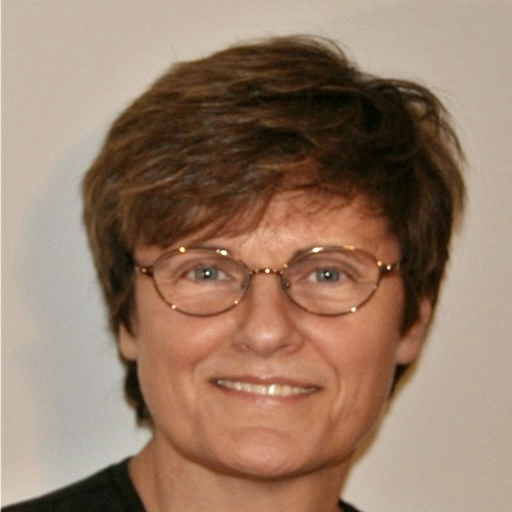
Katalin Karikó

Katalin Karikó is a Hungarian–American biochemist who specializes in ribonucleic acid (RNA)-mediated mechanisms, particularly in vitro-transcribed messenger RNA (mRNA) for protein replacement therapy. Karikó laid the scientific groundwork for mRNA vaccines and received numerous awards, honors, degrees and other distinctions, including the 2023 Nobel Prize in Physiology or Medicine.

Katalin Karikó who works at the University of Pennsylvania is credited with one of the most important scientific discoveries of the 21st century. Her development of Messenger RNA-based technology and the two most effective vaccines based on it, BioNTech/Pfizer and Moderna, paved the way for the effective fight against the SARS-CoV-2 virus and the containment of the COVID-19 pandemic worldwide. Her discovery also holds promise for future cures for many other diseases.

The Royal Swedish Academy of Sciences announced on 2 October 2023 that the 2023 Nobel Prize in Physiology and Medicine was awarded to Katalin Karikó and Drew Weissman for the development of mRNA technology. The Nobel Prize in Medicine has been awarded to 227 scientists since 1901, with Katalin Karikó being the thirteenth woman to receive the prize. Together with her, and Ferenc Krausz, who won the Nobel Prize in Physics the next day, the number of Hungarian Nobel laureates born in Hungary rose to twelve.

Fifteen Nobel laureates were born in Hungary and eighteen in the former Austro-Hungarian Monarchy (including Alfred Fried, Robert Bárány, and Richard Zsigmondy), with twenty-seven recognized as Hungarian citizens in total (see also: List of Hungarian Nobel laureates).

Karikó is the sixth laureate born as a Hungarian citizen in Physiology or Medicine and the first Hungarian woman to receive a Nobel Prize in any category.

The following list is restricted to the most authoritative international scientific institutions and the most prestigious awards and is not exhaustive.

== Awards and honors in 2020 ==
- Rosenstiel Award 2020 | Brandeis University | Drew Weissman |

== Awards and honors in 2021 ==
- Albany Medical Center Prize | Albany Medical | Barney Graham, Drew Weissman |
- Princess of Asturias Award | Princess of Asturias Foundation | Drew Weissman, Philip Felgner, Uğur Şahin, Özlem Türeci, Derrick Rossi, Sarah Gilbert |
- Dr. Paul Janssen Award | Johnson & Johnson | Drew Weissman |
- Debrecen Award for Molecular Medicine | University of Debrecen |
- German Future Prize | Federal President for Technology and Innovation | Uğur Şahin, Özlem Türeci, Christoph Huber |
- Golden Goose | National Institutes of Health, Tennessee | Drew Weissman |
- Golden Plate Award | Academy of Achievement |
- Grande Médaille | French Academy of Sciences |
- Harvey Prize | Technion – Israel Institute of Technology | Drew Weissman, Pieter Cullis |
- Hawking Fellowship | Professor Hawking Fellowship Committee, Cambridge, UK |
- John Scott Award | Philadelphia University | Drew Weissman |
- Keio Medical Science Prize 2021 | Keio University | Osamu Nureki |
- Lasker-DeBakey Clinical Medical Research Award | Albert and Mary Lasker Foundation | Drew Weissman |
- Louisa Gross Horwitz Prize | Columbia University | Drew Weissman |
- Prince Mahidol Award | Prince Mahidol Award Foundation under the Royal Patronage, Bangkok | Drew Weissman, Pieter Cullis |
- Széchenyi Prize | Government of Hungary |
- Time 100 – The 100 Most Influential People of 2021 | Time magazine |
- Time – 2021 Heroes of the Year | Time magazine | Kizzmekia Corbett, Barney Graham and Drew Weissman |
- VinFuture Grand Prize | VinFuture Foundation | Drew Weissman, Pieter Cullis |
- Wilhelm Exner Medal | Austrian Industrial Association | Luisa Torsi |
- William B. Coley Award for Distinguished Research in Basic and Tumor Immunology | Cancer Research Institute | Uğur Şahin, Özlem Türeci, Drew Weissman |

== Awards and honors in 2022 ==
- BBVA Foundation Frontiers of Knowledge Award | BBVA Foundation & Spanish National Research Council |
- Benjamin Franklin Medal in Life Science | The Franklin Institute of Philadelphia | Drew Weissman |
- Breakthrough Prize in Life Sciences 2022 | Breakthrough Prize Foundation | Drew Weissman |
- Canada Gairdner International Awards | Drew Weissman and Pieter Cullis |
- European Inventor Award for Lifetime achievement | European Patent Office |
- Helmholtz Medal 2022 | Berlin-Brandenburg Academy of Sciences and Humanities |
- Japan Prize | Japan Prize Foundation | Drew Weissman |
- Jessie Stevenson Kovalenko Medal | National Academy of Sciences (NAS), Washington | Drew Weissman |
- Louis-Jeantet Prize for Medicine | Louis-Jeantet Foundation, Geneva | Uğur Şahin, Özlem Türeci |
- L'Oréal-UNESCO For Women in Science Awards Laureate for North America | International Awards Jury of the L'Oréal-UNESCO For Women in Science |
- Mohammed bin Rashid Al Maktoum Knowledge Award | Dubai Culture and Arts Authority | Zhang Yongzhen, Drew Weissman |
- Paul Ehrlich and Ludwig Darmstaedter Prize | The Paul Ehrlich Foundation | Uğur Şahin, Özlem Türeci |
- Pearl Meister Greengard Prize | Rockefeller University |
- Tang Prize | Academia Sinica, Taiwan | Drew Weissman and Pieter Cullis |
- The Novo Nordisk Prize | Novo Nordisk Foundation | Uğur Şahin, Özlem Türeci, Drew Weissman |
- Vilcek Prize for Excellence in Biotechnology | Vilcek Foundation |
- Warren Alpert Prize | Harvard Medical School | Uğur Şahin, Özlem Türeci, Drew Weissman, Eric Huang |
- Werner von Siemens Ring | The Werner von Siemens Ring Foundation | Uğur Şahin, Özlem Türeci, Christoph Huber |

== Awards and honors in 2023 ==
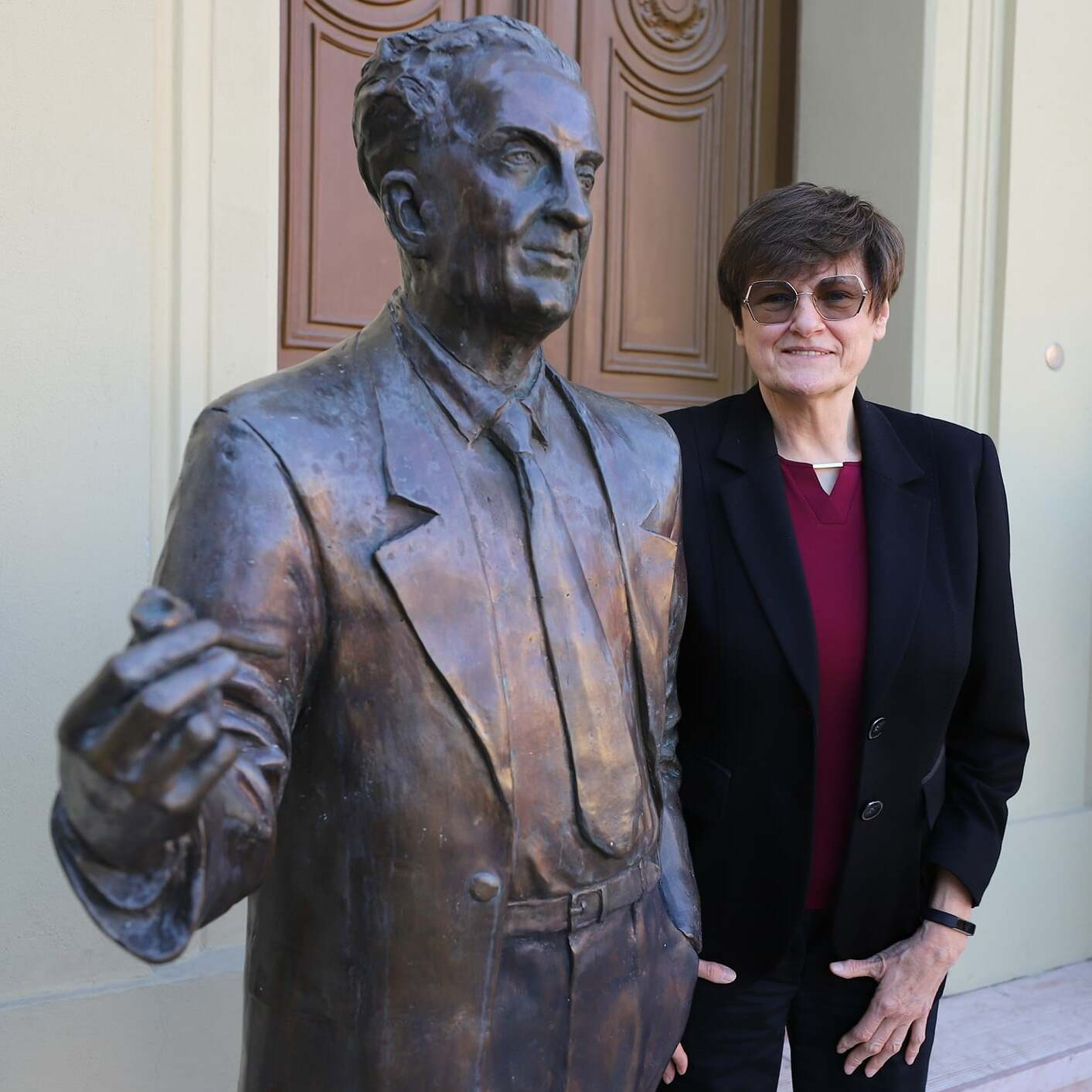
Karikó Katalin with a statue of Albert Szent-Györgyi, a fellow Nobel Prize in Physiology or Medicine winner, at the University of Szeged

- 2023 Nobel Prize in Physiology or Medicine | Royal Swedish Academy of Sciences | Drew Weissman |
- Cameron Prize for Therapeutics of the University of Edinburgh |
- Hungarian Order of Saint Stephen | Katalin Novák President of the Republic of Hungary |
- Meyenburg Prize | Helmholtz Institute for Translational Oncology (HI-TRON) | Uğur Şahin, Özlem Türeci |

== Awards and honors in 2024 ==
- Double Helix Medal | Cold Spring Harbor Laboratory | Daniel Doctoroff, Alisa Doctoroff |
- Nierenberg Prize for Science in the Public Interest | Scripps Institution of Oceanography |
- Paul Karrer Gold Medal | University of Zurich, Switzerland |

== Awards and honors in 2025 ==
- Mendel Lecture | European Society of Human Genetics (ESHG) |

== Honorary degrees ==
=== Honorary degrees in 2021 ===
- University of Szeged |
- Duke University | Drew Weissman, Ken Jeong, Mary Schmidt Campbell |
- Humanitas University of Milan |

=== Honorary degrees 2022 ===
- Eötvös Loránd University Budapest |
- Radboud University |
- Rockefeller University | Anthony Fauci, Lulu C. Wang |
- Tel Aviv University | Cornelia Bargmann, Sir Michael Victor Berry, Barbara Engelking, Eric J. Gertler, James S. Gertler, Bernd Friedrich Huber, Jodi Kantor, Solomon Lew, Jehuda Reinharz, Jürgen Renn |
- Université libre de Bruxelles |
- University of Geneva | Susan M. Gasser, Susan Goldin-Meadow, Ananya Roy |
- Yale University| Caroline Shaw, Krista Tippett, Madeleine Albright, James Clyburn, Jill Lepore, Myron Thompson, Jean Bennett, Drew Weissman, Orlando Patterson |

=== Honorary degrees 2023 ===
- Brandeis University |
- University College Cork – National University of Ireland, Cork (UCC) |
- Harvard University | David Levering Lewis, Michael Mullen, Jennifer Doudna, Hugo Noé Morales Rosas, Tom Hanks |
- Princeton University | Lynn A. Conway, Arcadio Díaz-Quiñones, Rhiannon Giddens, Suzan Shown Harjo |
- Rutgers University |
- Chinese University of Hong Kong (CUHK) |

=== Honorary degrees 2024 ===
- New York University (NYU) |
- State University of New York |

=== Honorary degrees 2025 ===
- Medical University of Vienna |

=== Honorary degrees 2026 ===
- University of Oxford |
- Johns Hopkins University |
- Drexel University |

== Membership in Professional & Scientific Societies ==
=== 2020 ===
- Member | Academia Europea |

=== 2021 ===
- Member | AAAS Fellows | American Association for the Advancement of Science |
- Member | Academy of Achievement |
- Foreign Member | French Académie des sciences | William Timothy Gowers, Martin Hairer, Anne L'Huillier, Wolfgang Wernesdorfer, Annalisa Buffa, Yann Le Cun, Susan Brantley, Frank Eisenhauer, Sason Shaik, Nicola Spaldin, Nicole King, Alberto R. Kornblihtt , Angela Nieto, Eva H. Stukenbrock, Cédric Blanpain |
- Hawking Fellow | Cambridge Union |

=== 2022 ===
- Member | German National Academy of Sciences | German National Academy of Sciences Leopoldina |
- Member | Hungarian Academy of Sciences |
- Member | National Academy of Inventors |
- Member | National Academy of Medicine – Washington |

=== 2023 ===
- Member | European Molecular Biology Organization (EMBO) |

=== 2024 ===
- Member | The American Philosophical Society |
- Ordinary member | Pontifical Academy for Life |

=== 2025 ===
- Member | National Academy of Sciences |
- Member | National Academy of Engineering |
