= Koranyi =

Koranyi or Korányi is a Hungarian surname, which is a Hungarian form of the German surname Kornfeld (meaning "cornfield"). Hungarian doctor Frigyes Korányi and his family pioneered the name when they changed their surname from Kornfeld to Korányi in the 1830s, upon converting from Judaism to Catholicism. The name may refer to:

- Ádám Korányi, Hungarian-American mathematician
- Balázs Korányi (born 1974), Hungarian athlete
- Dávid Korányi (born 1980), Hungarian diplomat
- Désiré Koranyi (1914–1981), French football player
- Frigyes Korányi (physician) (1828–1913), Hungarian doctor
- Frigyes Korányi (politician) (1869–1935), Hungarian politician
- Jacob Koranyi (born 1983), Swedish cellist
- Lajos Korányi (1907–1981), Hungarian footballer
- Sándor Korányi (1866–1944), Hungarian doctor
- Stephan Koranyi (1956–2021), German philologist and editor

== See also ==
- Kevin Kurányi (born 1982), German footballer
