= List of Hungarian Nobel laureates =

The Nobel Prizes are five separate prizes that, according to Alfred Nobel's will of 1895, are awarded to "those who, during the preceding year, have conferred the greatest benefit to humankind." In 1968, a sixth prize, the Nobel Memorial Prize in Economic Sciences, was established.

Hungarians have won 16 Nobel Prizes since 1905. Following is a complete list of the Nobel laureates of Hungary, as recognised by the Hungarian Academy of Sciences.

== Laureates ==
Hungarians have received Nobel Prizes in Physics, Chemistry, Physiology or Medicine, Literature, and Economics – in all fields except Peace.

Year	Image	Laureate	Field	Contribution
1905		Philipp Lenard	Physics	for his work on cathode rays
1914		Robert Bárány	Physiology or Medicine	for his work on the physiology and pathology of the vestibular apparatus
1925		Richard Adolf Zsigmondy	Chemistry	for his demonstration of the heterogeneous nature of colloid solutions and for the methods he used, which have since become fundamental in modern colloid chemistry
1937		Albert Szent-Györgyi	Physiology or Medicine	for his discoveries in connection with the biological combustion processes, with special reference to Vitamin C and the catalysis of fumaric acid
1943		George de Hevesy	Chemistry	for his work on the use of isotopes as tracers in the study of chemical processes
1961		Georg von Békésy	Physiology or Medicine	for his discoveries of the physical mechanism of stimulation within the cochlea
1963		Eugene Wigner	Physics	for his contributions to the theory of the atomic nucleus and the elementary particles, particularly through the discovery and application of fundamental symmetry principles
1971		Dennis Gabor	Physics	for his invention and development of the holographic method
1986		John Polanyi	Chemistry	for his contributions concerning the dynamics of chemical elementary processes
1994		George Andrew Olah	Chemistry	for his contribution to carbocation chemistry
1994		John Harsanyi	Economics	for pioneering analysis of equilibria in the theory of non-cooperative games
2002		Imre Kertész	Literature	for writing that upholds the fragile experience of the individual against the barbaric arbitrariness of history
2004		Avram Hershko (Hungarian spelling: Herskó)	Chemistry	
2023		Katalin Karikó	Physiology or Medicine	for their discoveries concerning nucleoside base modifications that enabled the development of effective mRNA vaccines against COVID-19
2023		Ferenc Krausz	Physics	for experimental methods that generate attosecond pulses of light for the study of electron dynamics in matter
2025		László Krasznahorkai	Literature	for his compelling and visionary oeuvre that, in the midst of apocalyptic terror, reaffirms the power of art

=== Also sometimes included ===
- 1976, Physiology or Medicine: Daniel Carleton Gajdusek, who was born in the United States to parents from the Kingdom of Hungary; his mother was Hungarian and his father Slovak.
- 1976, Economics: Milton Friedman, who was born in the United States to Hungarian parents from Beregszász, Bereg County, Kingdom of Hungary
- 1986, Peace: Elie Wiesel, who was born to Hungarian parents in 1928 in Sighet, Transylvania (until 1920 part of Hungary)

== Unsuccessful nominees ==
Year(s)	Image	Nominee	Field	Nominated by
1911, 1914, 1917		Loránd Eötvös	Physics	Izidor Fröhlich, Radó von Kövesligethy, Jenő Klupathy, Philipp Lenard
1901		Vilmos Schulek	Physiology or Medicine	Lajos Thanhoffer, Antal Genersich
1901		Endre Hőgyes	Physiology or Medicine	Frigyes Korányi, Antal Genersich
1901		Josef von Fodor	Physiology or Medicine	Endre Hőgyes, Antal Genersich
1901, 1931, 1937		Sándor Korányi	Physiology or Medicine	Ottó Pertik, Pál Hári, Louis Nékám, Emil Grósz, Zoltán Vámossy, József Frigyesi, István Tóth, Géza Illyés, László Kétly, Tibor Verebélÿ, Philipp Schwartz, Lajos Ádám
1904		István Apáthy	Physiology or Medicine	Willem Rommelaere
1928, 1940		Géza Mansfeld	Physiology or Medicine	László Rhorer, István Rusznyák
1943		Ladislas J. Meduna	Physiology or Medicine	Jakob Klaesi
1949, 1950, 1951, 1952, 1953		Hans Selye	Physiology or Medicine	...
1950		Miklós Jancsó	Physiology or Medicine	József Frigyesi, Béla Issekutz, Sándor Mozsonyi
1901, 1902		Ferenc Kemény	Literature	Imre Pauer, Gusztáv Heinrich
1925, 1926, 1927		Ferenc Herczeg	Literature	Members of the Hungarian Academy of Sciences
1935		Dezső Szabó	Literature	Björn Collinder
1936, 1937		Cécile Tormay	Literature	János Hankiss, Károly Pap, János Horváth, Jenő Pintér, Fredrik Böök
1965, 1966		Gyula Illyés	Literature	John Lotz
1965-1970		George Popják	Chemistry	
1967		György Lukács	Literature	Erik Lindegren
1969, 1970		László Mécs	Literature	Watson Kirkconnell
1970, 1971		Sándor Weöres	Literature	Áron Kibédi Varga
1911, 1928, 1929, 1930, 1932		Albert Apponyi	Peace	19 Professors of Law, Members of the Faculty of Law at the University of Pécs, Members of the Faculty of History and Philosophy at the University of Szeged, Members of the Faculty of Philosophy at the University of Pécs, Members of the Faculty of Law at the University of Debrecen (József Tisza), The Hungarian Inter-Parliamentary Group (Albert Berzeviczy), The professors at the Faculty of Law at the Elisabeth University of Pécs, 3 professors at the Faculty of Philosophy at the University of Pécs, Professors at the Faculty of History and Philosophy at the University of Szeged

== Sources ==
- Binder, David (2013). Farewell, Illyria. Budapest, Hungary: Central European University Press. ISBN 978-615-5225-74-1.
- Hoare, Marko Attila (2007). The History of Bosnia: From the Middle Ages to the Present Day. London, England: Saqi. ISBN 978-0-86356-953-1.
- Lampe, John R. (2000) [1996]. Yugoslavia as History: Twice There Was a Country (2nd ed.). Cambridge, England: Cambridge University Press. ISBN 978-0-521-77401-7.
