= Frigyes Korányi =

Frigyes Korányi may refer to:

- Frigyes Korányi (physician) (1828–1913), Hungarian physician
- Frigyes Korányi (politician) (1869–1935), his son, Hungarian politician
