= Cornfeld =

Cornfeld is a surname. Notable people with the surname include:

- Bernard Cornfeld (1927–1995), prominent businessman and international financier
- Leslie Cornfeld, Federal Prosecutor and Deputy Chief for the US Attorney's Office, New York Eastern District
- Stuart Cornfeld (1952–2020), American film producer

== See also ==
- Cornfield (surname)
- Kornfeld
- Kornfield
