= Suhadolnik =

Suhadolnik is a surname. Notable people with the surname include:

- Gary Suhadolnik, American politician
- Robert J. Suhadolnik (1925–2016), American biochemistry professor
