= Cornfield =

Cornfield(s) or The Cornfield may refer to:

- A field of maize, wheat or other cereal crop

== Places ==
- Cornfields, Arizona, United States
- Cornfields, KwaZulu-Natal, South Africa
- The Cornfield (Fly Creek, New York), a historic social hall

== Other uses ==
- Cornfield (surname), a list of persons with the name
- The Cornfield, an 1826 oil painting by the English artist John Constable

== See also ==
- Corn (disambiguation)
- Corn Field Raids of 1827–1828
- Field of Corn, a 1994 art installation in Dublin, Ohio, U.S.
