= Blind Fury =

1989 film by Phillip Noyce

- Theatrical release poster
- Directed by: Phillip Noyce
- Written by: Charles Robert Carner
- Based on: Zatoichi by Kan Shimozawa; Zatoichi Challenged by Ryôzô Kasahara
- Produced by: Tim Matheson; Daniel Grodnik
- Starring: Rutger Hauer; Terrance O'Quinn; Lisa Blount; Randall "Tex" Cobb; Noble Willingham
- Cinematography: Don Burgess
- Edited by: David A. Simmons
- Music by: J. Peter Robinson
- Production company: Interscope Communications
- Distributed by: Tri-Star Pictures
- Release dates: August 17, 1989 (West Germany); March 16, 1990 (United States)
- Running time: 86 minutes
- Country: United States
- Language: English
- Box office: $2.7 million

Blind Fury is a 1989 American action film directed by Phillip Noyce and starring Rutger Hauer, Terry O'Quinn, Lisa Blount, Randall "Tex" Cobb, and Noble Willingham. It is a modernized, English-language remake of Zatoichi Challenged, the 17th film in the Japanese Zatoichi film series.

The film follows Nick Parker (Hauer), a blind, sword-wielding Vietnam War veteran, who returns to the United States and befriends the son of an old friend. Parker decides to help the boy find his father (O'Quinn), who has been kidnapped by a crime syndicate. This was Phillip Noyce's American film debut.

After premiering in West Germany, Blind Fury was released in the United States by Tri-Star Pictures on August 17, 1989. It received mixed-to-positive reviews, but failed to find an audience at the box office. In the years since its release, the film has developed a cult following.

== Plot ==
While serving in Vietnam, American soldier Nick Parker is blinded by a mortar explosion. Rescued by local villagers, he recovers his health and, though he remains blind, is trained to master his other senses and be an expert swordsman.

20 years later, having returned to the United States, he seeks out his old army buddy Frank Deveraux, only to find that Deveraux is missing. Parker meets Frank's son Billy and his mother Lynn, Frank's ex-wife. Minutes later, corrupt police officers working for Frank's boss Claude MacCready arrive to kidnap Billy, planning to use him as leverage over Frank. MacCready's henchman Slag knocks Billy unconscious and mortally wounds Lynn when she tries to reach her son. Nick kills the officers, but Slag escapes. With her last words, Lynn tells Nick to take Billy to his father in Reno, Nevada.

At a rest stop in Kansas on the way to Reno, Nick tells Billy about his mother's death. Distraught, Billy runs away from Nick into a cornfield and Slag ends up grabbing him. Slag escapes as Nick rescues Billy a second time, and Billy and Nick (now called Uncle Nick) become fond of one another.

They reach Reno and find Frank's girlfriend Annie, who agrees to take them to Frank. After escaping yet another attempted kidnapping by MacCready's men, Annie suggests they hide out at the home of her friend Colleen. Annie takes Nick to MacCready's casino, where Frank is being forced to create designer drugs for MacCready. Annie returns to Colleen's to watch over Billy while Nick saves Frank; Nick and Frank are reunited. Frank takes the key ingredient in MacCready's drugs and destroys the lab. Avoiding casino security, Nick and Frank escape and head to Colleen's to reunite Billy with his dad. They find Colleen dead, Billy and Annie kidnapped, and a note instructing them to bring the drugs to MacCready's mountain penthouse in exchange for Billy and Annie.

Knowing it is an ambush, Nick and Frank arm themselves with homemade napalm bombs. After killing all of MacCready's men, they find MacCready holding Billy and Annie at gunpoint. MacCready hired a Japanese assassin to kill Nick, but after a sword fight between the two, Nick wins by electrocuting the assassin in a hot tub. Slag shoots Nick in the shoulder and Nick throws his sword at Slag, impaling him. MacCready tries to interfere only to be stopped by Frank. Billy escapes his rope and throws Nick's sword to him, but it lands in the hot tub. As Slag reaches for his gun, Nick grabs hold of the assassin's sword and slashes him, cutting him in half and causing him to fall out of a window.

Frank is reunited with Billy and Annie, and they prepare to leave for San Francisco. Nick drops his ticket, choosing not to go. Billy follows Nick, telling him that he needs him. Nick says that while he is fond of Billy, he should go back to his father. Nick crosses the street and vanishes as a bus passes him. Saddened by Nick's departure, Billy throws a toy dinosaur off the bridge where Nick catches it. Billy calls out to Nick one last time and tells him that he will miss him. As Frank catches up to Billy, they embrace. Nick smiles and sheds a tear, puts on his sunglasses while holding Billy's toy dinosaur with his left arm in a sling, and walks off into the distance.

== Cast ==
- Rutger Hauer as Nick Parker
- Terry O'Quinn as Frank Deveraux
- Brandon Call as Billy Deveraux
- Noble Willingham as Claude MacCready
- Lisa Blount as Annie Winchester
- Randall "Tex" Cobb as Slag
- Nick Cassavetes as Lyle Pike
- Rick Overton as Tector Pike
- Meg Foster as Lynn Deveraux
- Shō Kosugi as The Assassin
- Charles Cooper as Ed Cobb
- Weasel Forshaw as Popcorn
- Roy Morgan as Six Pack
- Tim Mateer as Snow
- Sharon Shackelford as Colleen
- Jay Pennison and Tiger Chung Lee as Casino Bodyguards

== Production ==
Blind Fury marked the producing debut of actor Tim Matheson, who was a fan of the Zatoichi film series. Matheson and producer Daniel Grodnik spent seven years trying to find a distributor for the film. In 1986, the producers landed a deal with Tri-Star Pictures. According to Grodnik, various writers and directors were attached to the project before Phillip Noyce was hired as the film's director. This was the Australian director's American film debut, after his thriller Dead Calm was an international hit.

Rutger Hauer calls Blind Fury one of his "most difficult jobs" due to the combination of swordsmanship with playing a blind man. In preparation for the role, Hauer spent one month training with Lynn Manning, a blind Paralympian judoka whose first words to him were, "I don't get confused about what I see." Hauer's reverse-gripped cane sword, modeled on Zatoichi's signature shikomizue, was created by Tim Huchthausen.

Filming took place around the Southwestern United States, mainly in Sealy and Houston, Texas, and in Reno, Nevada, where the cast and crew underwent humid weather conditions. Of the intense weather conditions, Matheson stated, "We shot in [Texas] and [Nevada], and it was incredibly hot. Everything was burning up. We ended up buying a three-foot pool for the cast and crew to wade through to cope with the heat." Studio interiors were shot at Ren-Mar Studios in Los Angeles.

The names of the characters Tector and Lyle Pike are a nod to characters from the classic Western The Wild Bunch.

== Reception ==
On their syndicated television program Siskel and Ebert and the Movies, film critics Roger Ebert and Gene Siskel gave the film "Two thumbs up".

On Rotten Tomatoes, Blind Fury holds an approval rating of 53% based on 15 reviews, with an average rating of 4.9 out of 10. Metacritic, which uses a weighted average, assigned the film a score of 31 out of 100, based on 12 critics, indicating "generally unfavorable" reviews.

Reviewer Ian Jane of DVD Talk wrote, "Hauer does a commendable job in the lead and is reasonably convincing as a blind man. Like its Japanese predecessors, there is some humor interjected into the storyline that is handled well without becoming overbearing or taking over the action sequences."

A sequel to the film was planned, but due to the indifferent box office receipts, never materialized.
