= Earl Davie =

American biochemist (1927–2020)

Earl W. Davie
- Born: October 25, 1927; Tacoma, Washington
- Died: June 6, 2020 (aged 92); Bellevue, Washington
- Education: University of Washington (B.S., Ph.D.)
- Scientific career
- Fields: Biochemistry
- Institutions: University of Washington

Earl Warren Davie (October 25, 1927 - June 6, 2020) was an American biochemist. He was a professor emeritus of biochemistry at the University of Washington. Davie studied the blood proteins involved in coagulation and was among the first scientists to describe the steps of the clotting process. He was a member of the National Academy of Sciences and a fellow of the American Academy of Arts and Sciences.

== Early life ==
Davie was born on October 25, 1927, in Tacoma, Washington, to Charles and Teckla Davie. He grew up in La Grande, Washington and attended Eatonville High School. He received an undergraduate degree in 1950 from the University of Washington, where he had worked in the laboratory of biochemistry professor Donald Hanahan. He completed a Ph.D. at UW in 1954. During his doctoral studies, Davie worked with Hans Neurath to learn about protein structure and function.

== Career ==
After a postdoctoral fellowship with Fritz Lipmann at Harvard Medical School, Davie worked at the Case Western Reserve University School of Medicine from 1957 to 1962, where he met hematologist Oscar Ratnoff, the discoverer of Hageman factor (later known as factor XII). He then returned to the University of Washington, later chairing the biochemistry department for several years.

Davie has made significant research contributions to the understanding of coagulation. Davie and Ratnoff described the sequence of steps in the clotting cascade. Davie and Ratnoff published their clotting cascade model in 1964, around the same time that Robert Gwyn Macfarlane of the University of Oxford produced a similar model. Davie cofounded a biotechnology company, ZymoGenetics, in 1981. The company was purchased by Novo Nordisk several years later; in 2000, ZymoGenetics was recreated as an independent company and it was acquired by Bristol-Myers Squibb in 2010.

== Honors and awards ==
In 1980, Davie was elected to the National Academy of Sciences. He was named a fellow of the American Academy of Arts and Sciences in 1987. In 1993, Davie awarded the Stratton Medal from the American Society of Hematology; he was named a Legend in Hematology by the society in 2008. He received a Distinguished Achievement Award from the American Heart Association in 1995. The Centre for Blood Research at the University of British Columbia established the Earl W. Davie Symposium in his honor.
