= Oscar Ratnoff =

American hematologist and physician (1916–2008)

Oscar D. Ratnoff
- Born: August 23, 1916; New York City
- Died: May 20, 2008 (aged 91); Cleveland
- Education: Columbia University
- Known for: Discovery of factor XII
- Awards: Kovalenko Medal
- Scientific career
- Fields: Hematology
- Institutions: Johns Hopkins School of Medicine; Case Western Reserve University School of Medicine

Oscar Davis Ratnoff (August 23, 1916 – May 20, 2008) was an American physician who conducted research on the process of coagulation and blood-related disorders. Ratnoff discovered the substance later known as Factor XII and was one of the primary contributors to the delineation of the exact sequence that makes up the clotting cascade. He also made notable research contributions to the understanding of the complement system and to the detection and treatment of hemophilia.

Ratnoff was a professor at the Case Western Reserve University School of Medicine, served as president of the American Society of Hematology, and was elected to the National Academy of Sciences. He remained active in research at Case Western Reserve until he was 85 and he died in Cleveland a few years later.

== Early life ==
Ratnoff was born prematurely, the son of a New York pediatrician. Ratnoff's father was an associate of notable pediatrician Henry Koplik. Koplik advised Ratnoff's father that the newborn had little chance of survival and that he should allow the child to die. Instead, Ratnoff's father used hot water bottles to keep him warm. Ratnoff survived and became a strong student at the Brooklyn Boys' School before enrolling at Columbia University when he was 16.

After graduating from Columbia, a 19-year-old Ratnoff entered the Columbia University College of Physicians and Surgeons, where he graduated third in his medical school class. Ratnoff spent two years as an intern at Johns Hopkins School of Medicine and then was a research fellow with physiologist Walter Cannon at Harvard Medical School. After another year spent working at hospitals in New York, Ratnoff enlisted in the military beginning in 1943. He was a member of the United States Army Air Corps during World War II, teaching aviation physiology before working as a physician at an army hospital.

== Career ==
Returning from the military in 1946, Ratnoff secured a fellowship at Johns Hopkins. He became an instructor in medicine there, leaving in 1950 to move to Cleveland. Arthur Patek, the physician who recruited Ratnoff, may have also inspired some interest in coagulation. While a professor at Columbia, Patek had asked Ratnoff to review a research report on cirrhosis from noted physician Ernest Goodpasture. Ratnoff became interested in the observation that the blood of such patients clotted after death but soon turned back to liquid.

While practicing in Cleveland in 1954, Ratnoff treated a young railway worker John Hageman. The man had a long clotting time, but he had undergone successful surgery in the past without suffering from major bleeding. Working with biochemist Earl Davie, Ratnoff identified a protein missing in the man's blood. Ratnoff named the missing substance Hageman trait or Hageman factor. As other clotting factors had been discovered by the time of Ratnoff's encounter with his patient, Hageman factor became known as factor XII. In 1964, Ratnoff and Davie published their model of the clotting cascade; a similar cascade was independently reported by Robert Gwyn Macfarlane of the University of Oxford at around the same time.

At Case Western University, Ratnoff was a professor, division chief of hematology-oncology and interim chief of medicine. Ratnoff had a long association with immunologist Irwin Lepow, and they conducted some of the early research on inhibition of the complement system. Ratnoff and Ted Zimmerman developed an assay in the early 1970s to distinguish between classic hemophilia and von Willebrand disease, then used the same technology to identify carriers of classic hemophilia. In 1972, the American Society of Hematology selected Ratnoff to deliver its Henry M. Stratton Lecture. Three years later, Ratnoff served as the organization's president.

In the 1980s, Ratnoff became concerned about the risk of HIV transmission to patients with hemophilia because these patients received factor VIII treatments created from pooled blood samples. He and his associates had been the first to identify some of the symptoms of HIV/AIDS in hemophilia patients. Noting that AIDS antibodies were being increasingly detected among hemophiliacs, Ratnoff proposed at a 1983 Centers for Disease Control meeting that blood donors should be screened for hepatitis B as a surrogate for HIV, as there was no good screening test for HIV at the time. Ratnoff also favored using cryoprecipitate from local donors to treat these patients. Ultimately, his suggestions were not taken because of concerns that they would not result in enough clotting factor to meet patient demand. In the 1990s, genetic engineering techniques allowed for the production of factor VIII without donated blood.

== Honors and awards ==
Ratnoff was the second recipient of the H. P. Smith Award for Distinguished Pathology Educator from the American Society for Clinical Pathology. He was elected to the National Academy of Sciences in 1976 and received the organization's Jessie Stevenson Kovalenko Medal in 1985. He was named a Master of the American College of Physicians in 1983. He received the ACP's John Phillips Memorial Award in 1974 for outstanding contributions to clinical medicine. He won the George M. Kober Medal from the Association of American Physicians in 1988.

== Later life ==
Ratnoff, who received his first National Institutes of Health (NIH) research grant in 1951, was still NIH-funded as an emeritus professor in the 1990s. He remained engaged in research at Case Western Reserve until 2001. He died in 2008 and was survived by Marian, his wife of 63 years, and by two children. A sister, Helen Ratnoff Plotz, preceded him in death. She compiled and edited anthologies of poetry.
