= Jessie Stevenson Kovalenko Medal =

The Jessie Stevenson Kovalenko Medal is awarded every two years by the US National Academy of Sciences "for important contributions to the medical sciences." It was first awarded in 1952 and involves a prize of $25,000 plus $50,000 for research.

The Kovalenko Fund was donated by Michael S. Kovalenko in 1949 to the National Academy of Sciences in memory of his wife, Jessie Stevenson Kovalenko.

== Recipients ==
Recipient	Year	Achievement/Rationale
Katalin Kariko; Drew Weissman	2022	For their pioneering work in developing nucleoside-modified mRNA, the foundation for the first two approved COVID-19 vaccines.
Bert Vogelstein	2020	For his pioneering work in elucidating the fundamental principles of the molecular basis of human cancer and the application of this knowledge to improve the clinical management of patients.
James P. Allison	2018	For important medical discoveries related to the body’s immune response to tumors.
Huda Y. Zoghbi	2016	For her pioneering contributions to the fields of neurodegenerative proteinopathies, autism spectrum disorders, epigenetics, and developmental biology by coupling clinical observation and gene discovery with focused, in-depth mechanistic study.
Stuart H. Orkin	2013	For his pioneering achievements in defining the molecular basis of blood disorders and the mechanisms governing the development of blood stem cells and individual blood lineages. His work has significantly advanced our understanding of human hematologic diseases and revealed new strategies to prevent and manage these disorders.
Janet D. Rowley	2010	For her discovery of recurring chromosome translocations that characterize specific hematological malignancies, a landmark event that caused a major shift in the paradigms relating to cancer biology in the 1970s and paved the way for development of specific treatment for two leukemias.
Jeffrey M. Friedman	2007	For the discovery of leptin and its role in the regulation of appetite, energy expenditure, and the molecular mechanisms underlying obesity.
Irving L. Weissman	2004	For his seminal studies that defined the physical properties, purification, and growth regulation of multipotent hematopoietic stem cells.
Robert J. Lefkowitz	2001	For his elucidation of the structure, function, and mechanism of regulation of heptahelical receptors, nature's detectors of signals from many hormones, neurotransmitters, and drugs.
Hugh O. McDevitt	1998	For his landmark discovery and identification of genes that control immune responsiveness, and for his subsequent elucidation of mechanisms of antigen recognition and induction of the immune response.
Donald Metcalf	1994	For his discovery and purification of the hemotopoietic growth factors and for their introduction into clinical medicine for the control of blood cell formation and resistance to infection.
Roscoe O. Brady	1991	For revolutionary accomplishments in human sphingolipid storage disorders, including the discovery of enzymatic defects, the development of genetic counseling procedures, and successful enzyme-replacement therapy.
Maclyn McCarty	1988	For the discovery and characterization, with Avery and McLeod, that deoxyribonucleic acid is the chemical substance of heredity, and for his subsequent contributions to our understanding of the biology of streptococci and their role in disease.
Oscar D. Ratnoff	1985	For his studies of the Hageman trait, an experiment of nature that improved understanding of such bodily defenses as the formation and dissolution of blood clots, inflammation, and immunity.
Henry G. Kunkel	1979	For his pioneering and influential studies in basic immunology, immune complex disease, immune deficiency disorders, and lymphocytic membrane markers.
Julius H. Comroe, Jr.	1976	For his immeasurable contribution to the diagnosis and treatment of human disease during his career, which was devoted to the physiology and chemistry of respiration and the mechanical and chemical properties of the human lung.
Seymour S. Kety	1973	For furthering the essential understanding of balance between hereditary and other biological factors, on the one hand, and psychosocial experimental ones, on the other, in the pathogenesis and manifestations of schizophrenia.
Thomas Francis, Jr.	1970	For his laboratory and epidemiological researches on virus diseases, including his major role in the program for the evaluation of the polio vaccine and for his imaginative design for long-term studies of the atomic bomb survivors in Japan.
Karl Paul Link	1967	For his discovery and application of coumarin anticoagulants.
Rufus Cole	1966	For his notable role in advancing our knowledge of lobar pneumonia and in establishing clinical investigation as a science.
George H. Whipple	1962	For his contributions of many biological discoveries basic for advances in clinical and experimental medicine.
Karl F. Meyer	1961	For his outstanding contributions to medical sciences as an investigator, teacher, and administrator over a period of half a century.
Eugene L. Opie	1959	For his outstanding contributions to medical science and for a life of exemplary devotion to medical education and inquiry into the origins of disease.
Ernest W. Goodpasture	1958	For his outstanding contributions to medical science and for long and continued devotion to the study of his chosen field of pathology.
Peyton Rous	1955	
Alfred N. Richards	1952	For his outstanding contributions to medical science over a period of a half-century, both as an investigator and as a research executive and administrator.

== See also ==
- List of medicine awards
- Prizes named after people
