= Kornfield =

Kornfield is a surname. Notable people with the surname include:

- Jack Kornfield (born 1945), American author and Theravada Buddhist
- Julia A. Kornfield, American chemical engineer
- Tyler Kornfield (born 1991), American cross-country skier
- Victoria Kornfield, American schoolteacher and politician

== See also ==
- Kornfeld
- Cornfield (surname)
- Cornfeld
