= ZymoGenetics =

Former biotechnology company

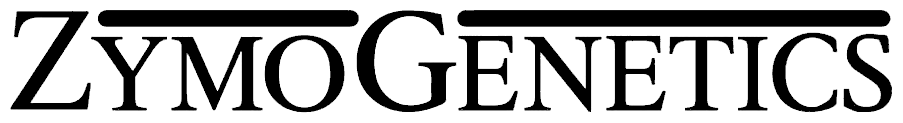
- Type: Public
- Industry: Biotechnology/Pharmaceuticals
- Founded: 1981; 45 years ago in Seattle, Washington
- Founders: Earl W. Davie, Michael Smith and Benjamin D. Hall
- Headquarters: Lake Union Steam Plant Building, 1201 Eastlake Avenue East, Seattle, Washington, USA
- Key people: Stephanie Feldt
- Products: Pharmaceuticals
- Owner: Bristol-Myers Squibb
- Website: Archived website

ZymoGenetics, Inc was one of the oldest biotechnology/pharmaceutical companies in the US, based in Seattle, Washington. The company was involved in the development of therapeutic proteins. Located on Lake Union, the address of the ZymoGenetics headquarters was 1201 Eastlake Avenue East. It was closed in 2019 after its acquisition by Bristol Myers Squibb.

The company was founded in 1981 by Professors Earl W. Davie and Benjamin D. Hall of the University of Washington and 1993 Nobel Laureate in Chemistry Michael Smith of the University of British Columbia. Initially named Zymos, the company was forced to change its name to ZymoGenetics under threat of trademark infringement from the similarly named semiconductor company ZyMOS. Soon after its founding, ZymoGenetics began working on recombinant proteins with Danish company Novo, and was acquired by that company in 1988. It was spun off as a public company in 2000. Bristol-Myers Squibb acquired the company in 2010 for $885 million.

ZymoGenetics' headquarters occupied the landmark Lake Union Steam Plant building beginning in the mid-1990s. This structure was built from 1914 to 1921 by Seattle City Light, the municipal electric utility. At the time, the building was in poor condition with many broken windows; Bruce Carter, the chief executive at the time, described it as "the mother of all fixer-uppers". In December 2016, ZymoGenetics announced that they would not renew the lease to the Steam Plant building, due to expire in 2019; the Fred Hutchinson Cancer Research Center later moved into it. At the time, ZymoGenetics did not plan on closing its Bothell manufacturing site; however, it was sold to Seattle Genetics in August 2017. ZymoGenetics closed completely in 2019.

== Corporate governance ==
In late 2013, the company's president, Stephen W. Zaruby, left and took up the president and chief executive officer roles at Aurinia Pharmaceuticals.
