= Bertha Isabelle Barker =

American bacteriologist (1868–1963)

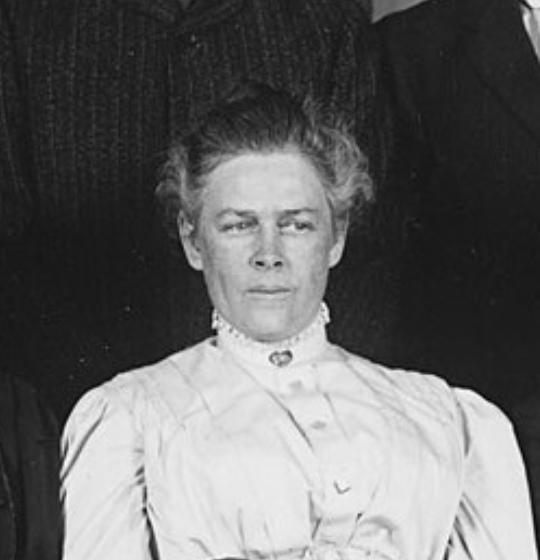
Bertha I. Barker

Bertha Isabelle Barker (January 6, 1868; November 15, 1963) was a resident fellow and scholar in bacteriology at the Rockefeller Institute for medical research under Eugene L. Opie. Barker contributed to numerous papers on the study of enzymes in blood cells. Barker and Opie demonstrated for the first time the presence of a protein digesting enzyme in the epithelioid cells which formed in tuberculous tissue.

== Life ==
Bertha Isabelle Barker was in born in Watertown, Massachusetts in 1876 to Alexander Augustus Barker and Lydia Jane Hutchins, who moved from Maine. She had an older sister named Cora Barker.

Barker enrolled in Wellesley College in 1887. Her address was 30 Lexington Avenue in Cambridge. She was a member of the glee club. She was a soprano. In 1891, Barker graduated with a bachelor of science.

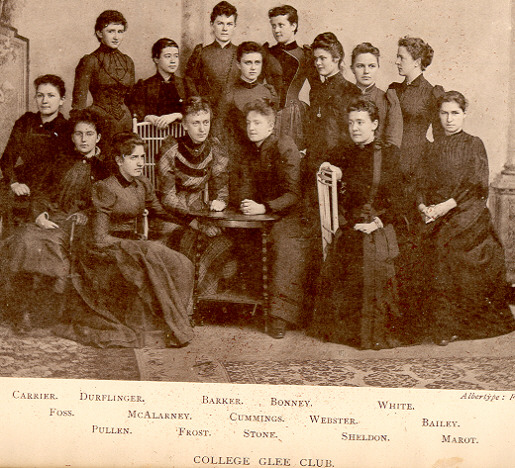
Wellesley College Glee Club (1891)

Subsequently, Barker worked as a high school teacher for about a decade. She began her studies at Massachusetts Institute of Technology in bacteriology. Barker was one of the first women to study at the university.

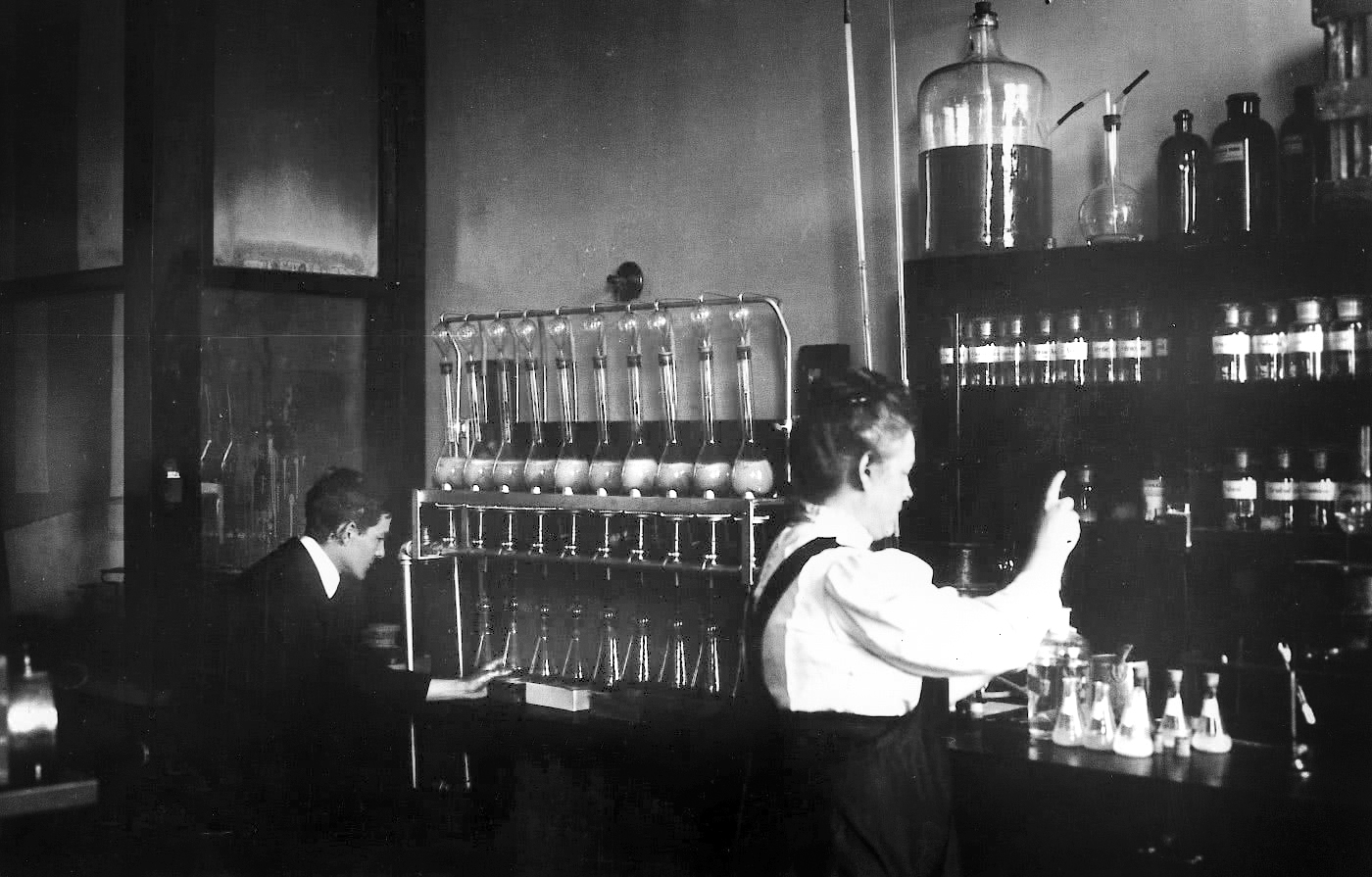
Bertha Barker in Eugene Opie's lab.

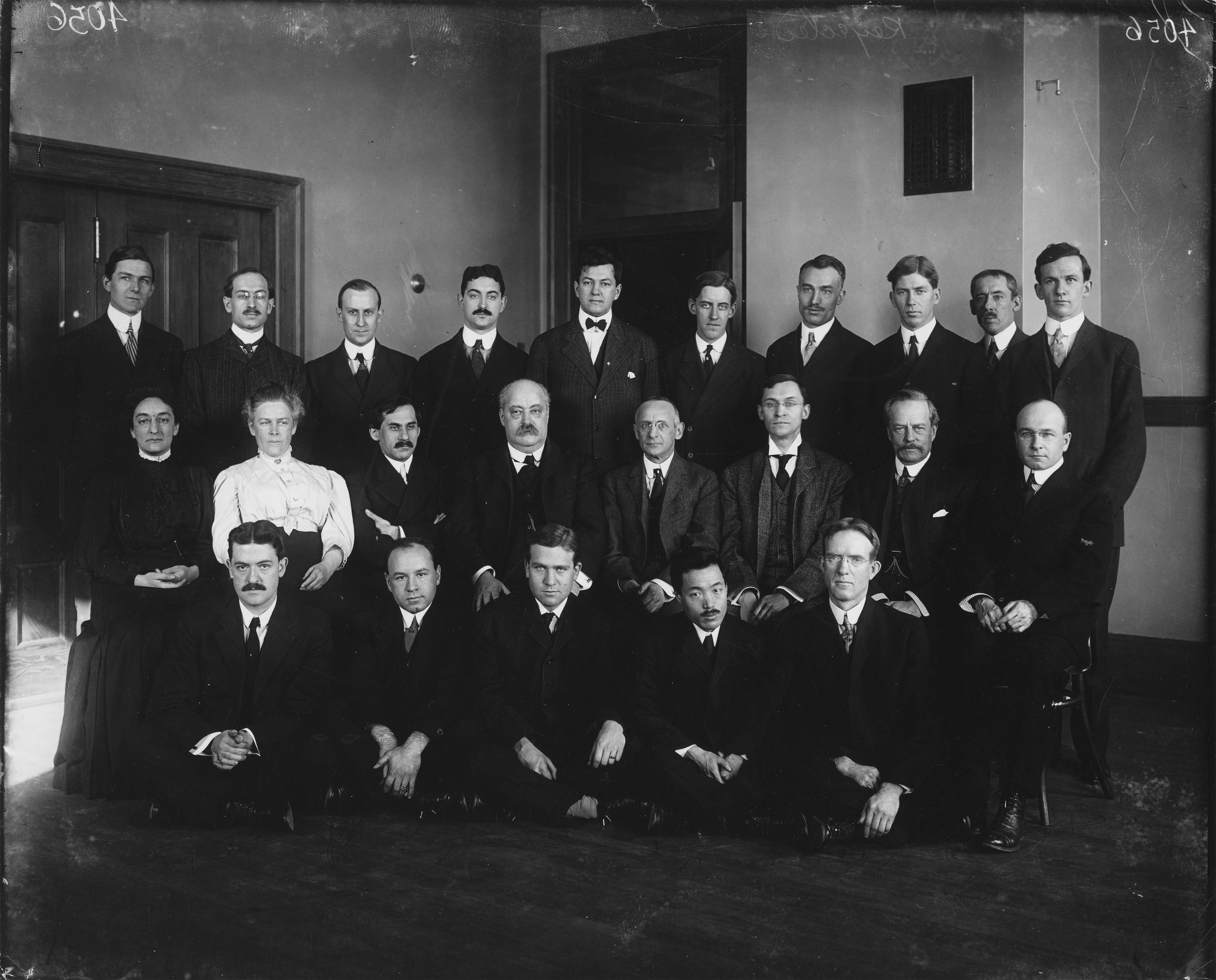
Rockefeller Institute of Medical Research Lab Staff (Barker dressed in white).

During the founding of Rockefeller Institute, Barker was hired as a resident fellow and scholar on scholarship under Eugene L. Opie in 1906. She worked in this position until 1910. Barker was colleagues with Hideyo Noguchi and the director Simon Flexner. In 1908, Barker was one of five women at the institute alongside Martha Wollstein.

Barker and Opie had been studying enzymes in blood cells which demonstrated the presence of protein digesting enzyme in the epithelioid cells that form tuberculous tissue. During her research, the enzyme exhibited significant activity when caseation of the tubercle begins and disappeared when caseation is completed. During her career, Barker has submitted numerous reports to the Journal of Experimental Medicine.

Later Barker returned to Massachusetts and worked as a nurse and superintendent of Mount Auburn hospital. She lived with her sister Cora. Eventually, Barker died November 15th, 1963 and a service was held on November 17. Barker was buried in Mount Auburn cemetery.

== Published works ==
- March 14, 1907 Leucoprotease And Anti-Leucoprotease Of Mammals And Of Birds
  - Journal of Experimental Medicine; Eugene L. Opie, Bertha I. Barker
- Sept 5, 1908: The Enzymes Of Fibrinous Exudates—The Effect Of One Enzyme Upon Another
  - Journal of Experimental Medicine; Bertha I. Barker
- Sept 5, 1908: Enzymes of Tuberculosis Tissue
  - Journal of Experimental Medicine; Eugene L. Opie, Bertha I. Barker
- May 1, 1908. The Enzymes Of Fibrin
  - Journal of Experimental Medicine; Bertha I. Barker
- Sept 2, 1909. Enzymes Of Tuberculous Exudates
  - Journal of Experimental Medicine; Eugene L. Opie, Bertha I. Barker
- April 1, 1910. Enzymes And Antienzymes Of The Blood Serum With Certain Degenerative Changes In The Liver
  - Journal of Experimental Medicine; Eugene L. Opie, Bertha I. Barker
- Jan 5, 1911: Changes In The Proteolytic Enzymes And Anti-Enzymes Of The Blood Serum Produced By Substances (Chloroform And Phosphorus) Which Cause Degenerative Changes In The Liver
  - Journal of Experimental Medicine; Eugene L. Opie, Bertha I. Barker, A. R. Dochez
- Sept 1, 1917. Clinical Studies On The Respiration: V. The Basal Metabolism And The Minute-Volume Of The Respiration Of Patients With Cardiac Disease
  - JAMA Internal Medicine; F. Peabody, J. A. Wentworth, Bertha I. Barker
