= Cornfield (surname) =

Cornfield is a surname. Notable people with the surname include:

- Charlotte Cornfield (born 1988), Canadian singer-songwriter
- Hubert Cornfield (1929–2006), American film director
- Jerome Cornfield (1912–1979), American statistician
- Jordan Cornfield (born 1982), Canadian lacrosse player

== See also ==
- Cornfield (disambiguation)
- Cornfeld
- Kornfield
- Kornfeld
