= Nagykálló =

Town in Szabolcs-Szatmár-Bereg County, Hungary

- Town
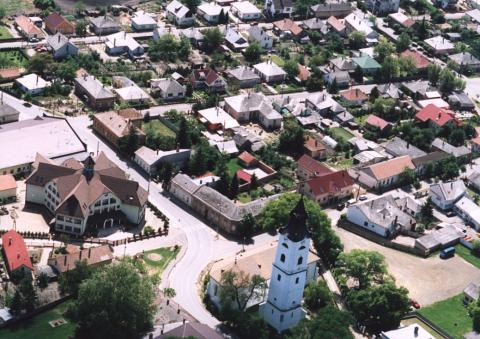
- Aerial view of Nagykálló

- Flag Coat of arms

- Location within Hungary
- Coordinates: 47°53′N 21°51′E
- Country: Hungary
- County: Szabolcs-Szatmár-Bereg
- District: Nagykálló

Area
  - Total: 68.55 km^{2} (26.47 sq mi)

Population (2005)
  - Total: 10,483
  - Density: 152.9/km^{2} (396.1/sq mi)
- Time zone: UTC+1 (CET)
  - Summer (DST): UTC+2 (CEST)
- Postal code: 4320
- Area code: (+36) 42
- Website: nagykallo.hu

Nagykálló (Yiddish: קאלעוו, romanized: Kalev) is a small town in Szabolcs-Szatmár-Bereg county, in the Northern Great Plain region of eastern Hungary. Before World War II it belonged to Szabolcs county.

== Location ==
14 km (9 mi) from county seat Nyíregyháza.

== History ==
Nagykálló was already an oppidum (market town) in the 14th century. Its name probably comes from the old word kálló meaning "gathering place". Nagy means "large"; this prefix was used to differentiate between Nagykálló and the nearby Kiskálló ("small Kálló"), which later became a part of Nagykálló.

In 1315 King Charles Robert granted the town rights to hold a market, later the county councils were held here, thus the town became the centre of the region. After the Ottomans burnt the town in 1556, the citizens built a stone castle for defence. In 1603 István Bocskai settled Hajdúk in the town. After his death they moved to Hajdúböszörmény, but Nagykálló remained an important industrial centre. It was the property of the Kállay de Nagy-Kálló family.

In 1630 George II Rákóczi occupied the town and issued the Proclamation of Independence here. Francis II Rákóczi attacked the castle on July 29, 1703 (first battle of the war for freedom) and occupied it the following day. In 1704 he ordered the castle to be destroyed (it was destroyed only later, in 1709). In 1747 the town became the county seat of Szabolcs county, but this role was taken over by Nyíregyháza in 1867. Nagykálló was granted town status again in 1989.

== Tourist sights ==
- Main square with Protestant church, old county hall and Freedom
- Millennium Memorial (1896)
- Protestant church, built around 1710: its belfry, The Rákóczi Tower (60 m, one of the tallest buildings on the Great Hungarian Plain) was built of the stones from the destroyed castle
- Roman Catholic church (18th century, late Baroque)
- Greek Catholic church (18th century, oldest building of the town)
- Jewish cemeteries
- Tomb of Grand Rebbe Itzhak Isaac of Kaliv, a shrine visited by Orthodox Jews
- Town Museum
- Frigyes Korányi Memorial House
- Harangod: a farmstead near Nagykálló. According to a local legend during the Mongol invasion of Hungary (mid-13th century) the villagers fled Nagykálló to escape the Mongol hordes, and at the urging of their priest they took the church bell with them, so that it won't b destroyed when the Mongols burn the village, but accidentally dropped it into the swamps outside the town. They couldn't save it, but later, when they went back to the town, it is said that sometimes they heard the sound of the bell coming from afar. (The name Harangod means "your bell" in Hungarian; in the legend the people told the priest when they heard the sound of the bell from the swamps: "listen, Father, there's your bell".)
- Hunger Hill: a 12 m high hill with a lookout tower on its top. According to a local legend it was built in 1780, when the people, suffering from a famine, asked their landlord Ferenc Kállay to give them food, and he said he will if they build this hill for him as an interest.
- Spa of Nagykálló

== People ==
- Benjamin von Kallay
- Miklós Kállay
- Imre Ámos, twentieth century Hungarian Jewish painter.
- Frigyes Korányi, physician
- Yitzchak Isaac Taub, famous Hassidic Rebbe

== Twin towns – sister cities ==
Nagykálló is twinned with:

- Borša, Slovakia
- Limanowa, Poland
- Metzingen, Germany
- Miguelturra, Spain
- Tășnad, Romania
- Tiachiv, Ukraine
