= Eugene Lindsay Opie =

American physician (1873–1971)

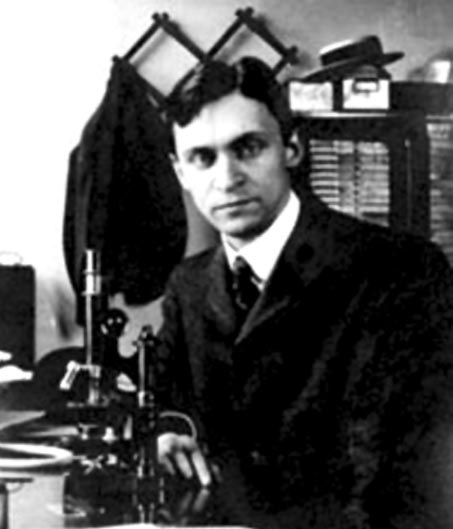
- Eugene Lindsay Opie, in 1903
- Born: July 5, 1873; Staunton, Virginia, U.S.
- Died: March 12, 1971 (age 97); Bryn Mawr, Pennsylvania, U.S.
- Education: Johns Hopkins University
- Known for: Research on diabetes mellitus and tuberculosis
- Scientific career
- Fields: Medicine, Pathology
- Workplaces: Johns Hopkins University; Rockefeller Institute; Washington University in St. Louis; Cornell University; University of Pennsylvania
- Doctoral advisor: William H. Welch

Eugene Lindsay Opie (July 5, 1873 – March 12, 1971) was an American physician and pathologist who conducted research on the causes, transmission, and diagnosis of tuberculosis and on immunization against the disease. He served as professor of pathology at several U.S. medical schools and as Dean of the Washington University School of Medicine (St. Louis, Missouri).

== Early life and education ==
Eugene Lindsay Opie was born in Staunton, Virginia, on July 5, 1873. His father, Thomas, was an obstetrician-gynecologist, and one of the founders and deans of the University of Maryland School of Medicine. Eugene attended Johns Hopkins University, both as an undergraduate and a medical student. He received an A.B. degree in 1893, and was in the first graduating class of the Johns Hopkins School of Medicine, earning the M.D. degree in 1897.

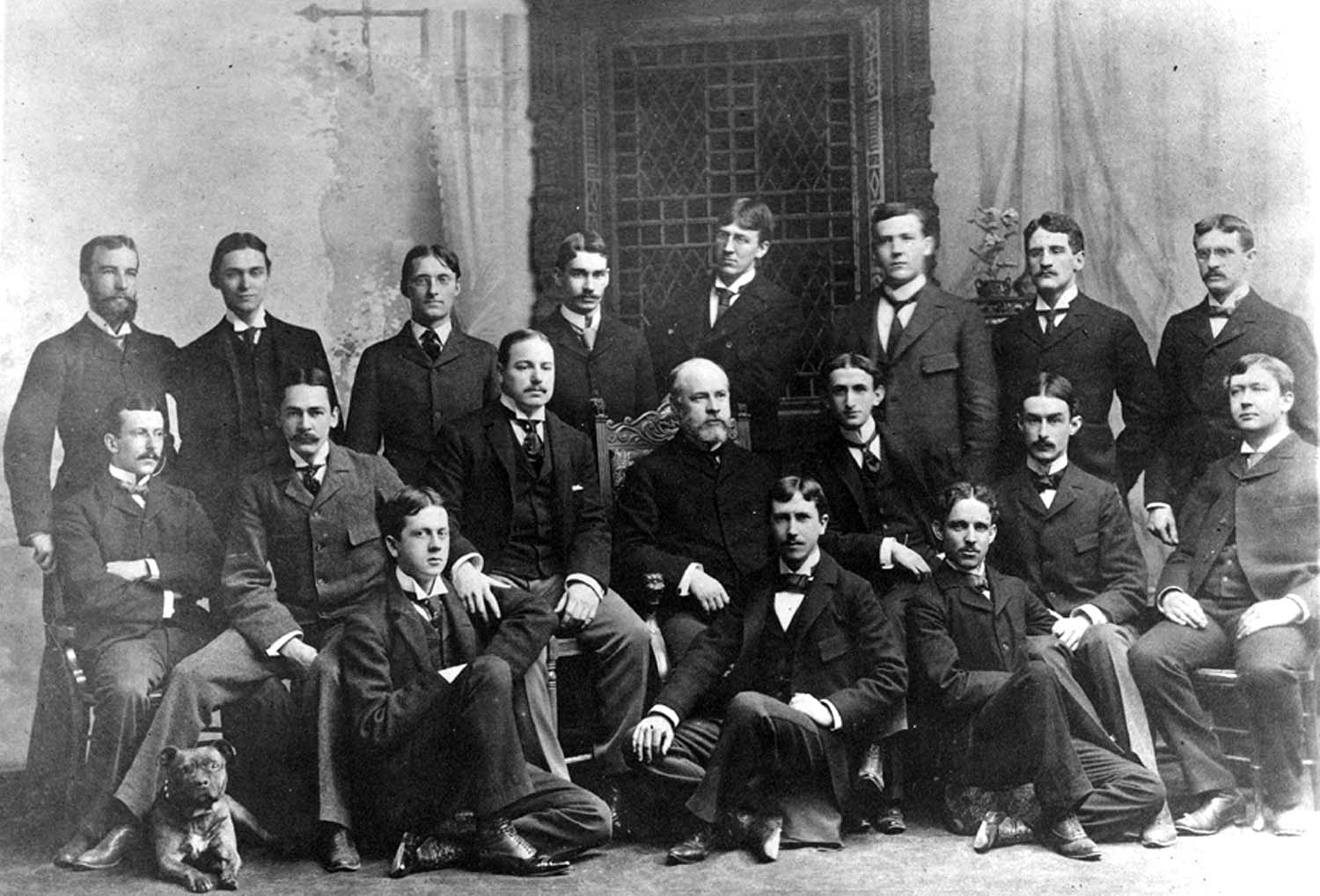
The first medical school graduating class of Johns Hopkins University, 1897; Opie is second from the left in the back row.

Under the tutelage of the pathologist William H. Welch, Opie developed a special affinity for tissue pathology. As a medical student, he observed consistent morphological alterations in the pancreatic islets of Langerhans in patients with diabetes mellitus – an observational epiphany that shed light on the pathogenesis of that disease.

== Career ==
Opie stayed on at Johns Hopkins after completing medical school, to receive additional training in pathology from Welch. He continued his work on pancreatic diseases, establishing the relationship between obstruction of the ampulla of Vater (e.g., by gallstones) and the subsequent development of acute pancreatitis.

In 1904, Opie moved to New York City to work at the Rockefeller Institute, with a focus on the enzymatic constituents of leukocytes and their role in inflammatory conditions. He concurrently served as a "visiting" pathologist at Columbia-Presbyterian Hospital, and was named an editor of the Journal of Experimental Medicine and the Proceedings of the Society for Experimental Biology.

=== Washington University in St. Louis ===
In 1910, Opie was appointed chair of pathology at Washington University School of Medicine (WashU Medicine) in St. Louis. He served as dean of the school from 1912 to 1915, presiding over a significant expansion of its physical facilities, scientific mission, and curriculum.

== Military service ==
When the United States entered World War I, Opie took a leave of absence from WashU Medicine to enter the U.S. Army. He served in France as a colonel (O6) in the Medical Corps, with special work on infectious diseases and their prevention among allied soldiers. Significant new data were accrued on influenza, tuberculosis, and "trench fever" (bartonellosis) during that time. Upon returning to civilian life, Opie continued his duties at WashU Medicine until 1923.

== Research on tuberculosis ==
Opie narrowed his general interest in infectious disease to focus on tuberculosis, an international scourge in the early part of the 20th century. During his time at the Rockefeller Institute, Opie and Bertha I. Barker had been studying enzymes in blood cells which demonstrated the presence of protein digesting enzyme in the epithelioid cells that form tuberculous tissue. In 1908, Opie and Barker demonstrated for the first time the presence of a protein digesting enzyme in the epithelioid cells which formed in tuberculous tissue.

In 1923 he became the director of the Phipps Institute for the Study and Treatment of Tuberculosis at the University of Pennsylvania in Philadelphia. A concomitant appointment as Professor of Pathology was also given to him. Through Opie's work over the next decade, much was learned about the modes of tuberculous infection in children and adults, as well as aspects of immunity, hypersensitivity, and cellular defenses regarding that disease. Opie moved to Weill Cornell Medicine in New York in 1932 to continue his research. There, as chair of the Pathology department, he recruited several young pathologists—including Robert A. Moore, D. Murray Angevine, Jules Freund, and others – who would all go on to distinguish themselves as renowned investigators in their own rights. Like Opie, Moore also served as chair of pathology and dean of the medical school at Washington University in the 1940s and 1950s.

== Retirement ==
Opie retired from full-time professional work in pathology in 1941, although that was not the end of his scientific endeavors. He again worked at the Rockefeller Institute as a "guest investigator" for the next 28 years. Peer-reviewed manuscripts bore his name as an author until 1970. In addition to infections, Opie did work on hepatic carcinogenesis, alterations in nucleic acid content in various disease states, and tissue fluid flux.

== Honors ==
Opie served as the president of the American Association of Pathologists and Bacteriologists; the American Society for Experimental Pathology, the National Tuberculosis Association; the American Association of Immunologists; and the Harvey Society. He was awarded honorary doctorates from Yale University, Rockefeller University, and Washington University.

Other accolades included the Weber-Parkes Prize from the Royal College of Physicians in 1945, the 1959 Jessie Stevenson Kovalenko Medal from the U.S. National Academy of Sciences, the 1960 Academy Medal for Distinguished Contributions in Biomedical Science from the New York Academy of Medicine, and the T. Duckett Jones Award.

== Personal life ==
Opie first married Gertrude Lovat Simpson on August 6, 1902, and had four children with her: Thomas Lindsay, Anne Lovat, Helen Lovat, and Gertrude Eugenie. Seven years after Gertrude's death in 1909, he married her sister Margaret Lovat Simpson (1874-1965) on September 16, 1916.

== Death ==
Opie died at Bryn Mawr Hospital in Bryn Mawr, Pennsylvania, on March 12, 1971, at the age of 97.

== See also ==
- Tuberculosis
