= János Grünn =

Hungarian politician (1864–1932)

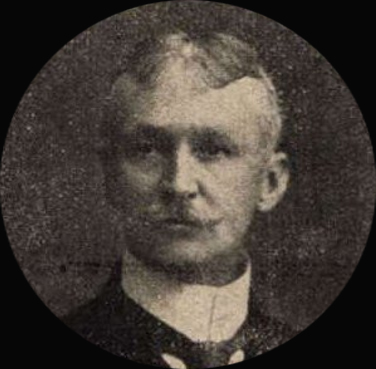
- Grünn in 1924

Minister of Finance of Hungary
- In office 15 August 1919 – 12 September 1919
- Prime Minister: István Friedrich
- Preceded by: Gyula Peidl
- Succeeded by: Frigyes Korányi

Personal details
- Born: 3 June 1864 Besztercebánya, Kingdom of Hungary
- Died: 5 March 1932 (aged 67) Budapest, Kingdom of Hungary
- Party: Independent
- Occupation: Politician

János Grünn (3 June 1864 – 5 March 1932) was a Hungarian politician, who served as Minister of Finance in 1919. After that he retired from politics.

== Early life ==
János Grünn was born on 3 June 1864 in Besztercebánya.

== Career ==
Grünn served as Minister of Finance from 15 August 1919 to 12 September 1919 under István Friedrich.

== Later life and death ==
After leaving office, he retired from politics.

Grünn died on 5 March 1932 in Budapest.

Political offices
Preceded by Gyula Peidl	Minister of Finance; 1919	Succeeded by Frigyes Korányi
