= Benjamin D. Hall =

American geneticist

Benjamin Downs Hall
- Born: December 9, 1932; Berkeley, California, United States
- Died: April 2, 2019 (aged 87); Seattle, Washington, United States
- Education: University of Kansas (BS, 1954); Harvard University (PhD, 1959)
- Scientific career
- Fields: Genetics; Genomics; Molecular Biology; Bioengineering
- Workplaces: University of Illinois; University of Washington

Benjamin Downs Hall was an American human genetics researcher. He was professor of genetics and botany at the University of Washington. Hall is best known for developing methods for producing vaccines and other bio-pharmecuticals using transgenic yeast.

== Biography ==
Hall was born in Berkeley, California. His family moved to Lawrence, Kansas in 1944. There he met his future wife, Margaret Ann Black, in the 7th grade. Upon graduating with a degree in chemistry from the University of Kansas in 1954, Hall and Margaret married before departing for Munich, Germany under the support of Hall's Fulbright Scholarship. Hall returned to the US in 1955 and he earned his doctorate in Biophysical Chemistry from Harvard University in 1959.

In 1963, Hall joined the University of Washington Genetics Department. He became the chair of the department in 1980, succeeding the founding chair, Herschel Roman. Hall remained on the faculty until his retirement in 2007.

Hall died in Seattle, Washington on April 2, 2019.

== Work ==
Hall's graduate thesis research identified the two major RNAs (18S and 28S) of the eukaryotic ribosome, under the mentorship of Paul M. Doty. After accepting a faculty appointment at the University of Illinois in 1958, Hall conducted studies of the RNA generated by T4 phage when infecting E. coli. By developing molecular hybridization techniques, his lab demonstrated that such RNAs had complementary sequences to those of the bacteriophage DNA, providing the first direct evidence for the existence of messenger RNA.

In 1963 Hall joined the faculty of the Department of Genetics at the University of Washington. Hall's subsequent accomplishments included the first demonstration of linkage between a DNA polymorphism and a phenotype, the discovery of tRNA introns, and production of the first DNA sequence of a mutant eukaryotic gene.

Hall's group also conducted studies of transcription by S. cerevisiae RNA Polymerases, identifying that several yeast RNA polymerases shared structural and functional similarity with those present in plants and animals. Based on these findings, Hall and colleagues developed methods for the expression of genetically engineered proteins in yeast. This technology established Saccharomyces as a facile organism for production of recombinant vaccines (including Hepatitis B and Human Papilloma virus vaccines) and other proteins having pharmaceutical value, including insulin.

Hall co-founded ZymoGenetics (then Zymos) in 1981, which was one of Seattle's first biotechnology companies.

Later in his career Hall studied the molecular systematics, taxonomy, and evolutionary history of fungi and flowering plants, and accepted a part time position in the department of botany. In collaboration with Jay Shendure’s laboratory, Hall's group determined the genome sequence of the Rhododendron species R. williamsianum.

The Benjamin D. Hall Interdisciplinary Research Building at the University of Washington was dedicated in Hall's honor in 2006.

== Honors ==
- Guggenheim Fellowship, 1961
- American Academy of Arts and Sciences, 2010
- National Academy of Sciences, 2014
