= Cornfields, KwaZulu-Natal =

Cornfields
- Location within KwaZulu-Natal Location within South Africa
- Coordinates: 28.867°S 29.869°E
- Country: South Africa
- Province: KwaZulu-Natal
- District: uThukela
- Municipality: Inkosi Langalibalele

Area
  - Total: 21.37 km^{2} (8.25 sq mi)

Population (2011)
  - Total: 3,757
  - Density: 175.8/km^{2} (455.3/sq mi)

Racial makeup (2011)
  - Black African: 99.8%
  - Coloured: 0.1%
  - Indian/Asian: 0.1%
  - White: 0.1%

First languages (2011)
  - Zulu: 98.6%
  - Other: 1.4%
- Time zone: UTC+2 (SAST)

Cornfields is a village in Inkosi Langalibalele Local Municipality in the KwaZulu-Natal province of South Africa.

The village was established in 1912 when Reverend William Cullen Wilcox bought a 1,483 hectares (3,660 acres) farm, which he divided into 276 plots and sold to black Africans.

It was intended as a place where Africans could live a Christian lifestyle, make a new beginning, grow crops and educate their children, and new tenants were required to be Christians. Despite the poor soil and low rainfall, the early settlers did manage to grow crops, and the village soon became a refuge for black people who were escaping farm labour.

The village grew into a sizeable community, but lost its Christian character. It now has a clinic, primary and high schools, and a community hall. It is said to suffer from high unemployment and crime.

The village is close to the site of the Weenen massacre, and the Blaauwkranz monument commemorating the victims is on the road to Cornfields.
