= Factor XII =

Mammalian protein involved in blood clotting

F12

Identifiers
- Aliases: F12, HAE3, HAEX, HAF, coagulation factor XII
- External IDs: OMIM: 610619; MGI: 1891012; GeneCards: F12
Available structures
PDB	Ortholog search: PDBe RCSB
PDB	List of PDB id codes 4BDW, 4BDX, 4XDE, 4XE4
Enzyme activity
EC #	BRENDA	ExPASy	KEGG	MetaCyc
3.4.21.38	↗	↗	↗	↗

Gene location (Human)
Chr.	Chromosome 5 (human)
Band	5q35.3	Start	177,402,133 bp
Band	5q35.3	End	177,416,583 bp

Gene location (Mouse)
Chr.	Chromosome 13 (mouse)
Band	13|13 B1	Start	55,565,771 bp
Band	13|13 B1	End	55,574,606 bp
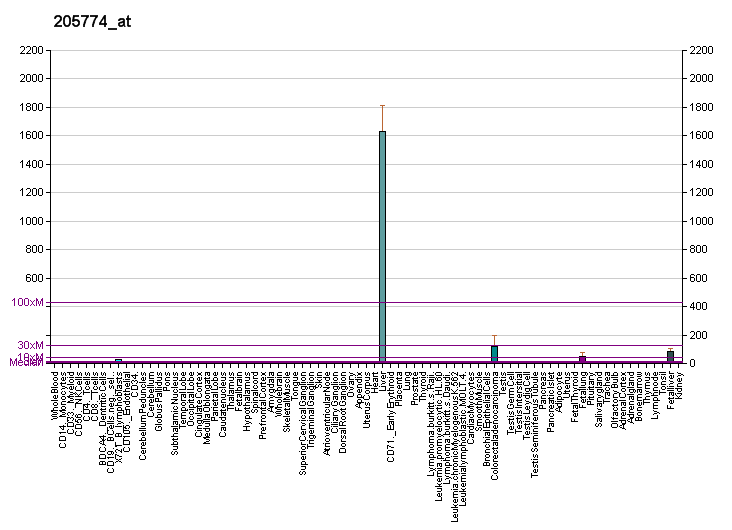
RNA expression pattern
Bgee	Human / Mouse (ortholog); Top expressed in: right lobe of liver; gingival epithelium; mucosa of transverse colon; testicle; endothelial cell; middle temporal gyrus; epithelium of esophagus; nucleus accumbens; caudate nucleus; putamen / Top expressed in: lobe of liver; left lobe of liver; granulocyte; morula; embryo; fetal liver hematopoietic progenitor cell; spermatid; sexually immature organism; abdominal wall; human fetus; More reference expression data
BioGPS	More reference expression data
Gene ontology
Molecular function	misfolded protein binding; peptidase activity; protein binding; serine-type peptidase activity; hydrolase activity; serine-type endopeptidase activity; calcium ion binding
Cellular component	plasma membrane; extracellular region; extracellular exosome; extracellular space; rough endoplasmic reticulum; collagen-containing extracellular matrix
Biological process	hemostasis; blood coagulation, intrinsic pathway; response to misfolded protein; positive regulation of plasminogen activation; fibrinolysis; zymogen activation; protein processing; protein autoprocessing; proteolysis; positive regulation of blood coagulation; positive regulation of fibrinolysis; innate immune response; regulation of blood coagulation; plasma kallikrein-kinin cascade; Factor XII activation; blood coagulation
Sources:Amigo / QuickGO
Orthologs
Databases	NCBI: entry; OMA: entry
Species	Human	Mouse
Entrez	2161	58992
Ensembl	ENSG00000131187	ENSMUSG00000021492
UniProt	P00748	Q80YC5
RefSeq (mRNA)	NM_000505	NM_021489
RefSeq (protein)	NP_000496	NP_067464
Location (UCSC)	Chr 5: 177.4 – 177.42 Mb	Chr 13: 55.57 – 55.57 Mb
PubMed search
- Wikidata
View/Edit Human	View/Edit Mouse

Coagulation factor XII, also known as Hageman factor, is a plasma protein involved in coagulation. It is the zymogen form of factor XIIa (EC 3.4.21.38), an enzyme of the serine protease (or serine endopeptidase) class. In humans, factor XII is encoded by F12 gene.

== Genetics ==
The gene for factor XII is located on the tip of the long arm of the fifth chromosome (5q33-qter).

== Structure ==
Human Factor XII is 596 amino acids long and consists of two chains, the heavy chain (353 residues) and light chain (243 residues) held together by a disulfide bond. It is 80,000 daltons in molecular weight. The heavy chain contains two fibronectin-type domains (type I and II), two epidermal growth factor-like domains, a kringle domain, and a proline-rich region, while the light chain contains the protease domain. FXII can be cleaved sequentially at two sites, Arg353 and Arg334, with the second cleavage liberating the light chain and forming β-FXIIa.

The structure of the FnI-EGF-like tandem domain of coagulation factor XII has been solved by X-ray crystallography. Crystal structures of the FXII light chain have also been determined, both unbound (β-FXII) and bound (β-FXIIa) to inhibitors.

== Function ==
The coagulation cascade.

Factor XII (FXII, Hageman factor) is a plasma glycoprotein of approximately 90 kDa and is part of the coagulation cascade. It activates factor XI and prekallikrein in vitro. FXII is activated to FXIIa by negatively charged surfaces such as glass, initiating the intrinsic pathway. FXII also plays a role in diagnostic coagulation assays called activated partial thromboplastin times (aPTT).

In vivo, FXII is activated by binding to polyanions in a process termed contact activation. Various polymers, such as kaolin and glass, act as non-physiological activators of FXII. Activated platelets release inorganic polyphosphates, which activate FXII, initiating the intrinsic pathway and contributing to fibrin formation and thrombus development. Polyphosphates also accelerate thrombin-induced activation of factor XI.

Polyphosphate forms calcium-rich nanoparticles in vivo, which accumulate on platelets and activate FXII. The regulation of platelet polyphosphates is still not fully understood, but the phosphate-exporter XPR1 has been identified as a key regulator. Targeting XPR1 increases polyphosphate levels, accelerating thrombosis in mouse models.

Given FXII's role in thrombosis while sparing hemostasis, it has become a target for anticoagulant drug development. Inhibitors targeting FXII are in clinical trials.

== Clinical significance ==
Factor XII deficiency is a rare disorder that is inherited in an autosomal recessive manner. Unlike other clotting factor deficiencies, factor XII deficiency is totally asymptomatic and does not cause excess bleeding. Mice lacking the gene for factor XII, however, are less susceptible to thrombosis. The protein seems to be involved in the later stages of clot formation rather than the first occlusion of damages in the blood vessel wall.

Factor XII does play an important role in clot formation during in vitro measurements of the partial thromboplastin time, which causes these measurements to be markedly prolonged in patients with factor XII deficiency, usually well beyond even what is seen in hemophilia A, hemophilia B, or factor XI deficiency. As a result, the main concern related to factor XII deficiency is the unnecessary testing, delay in care, worry, etc. that may be prompted by the abnormal lab result. All of this, including the mechanism of inheritance, also holds true for the other contact factors, prekallikrein (Fletcher factor) and high molecular weight kininogen.

Excess levels of factor XII can predispose individuals towards greater risk of venous thrombosis due to factor XII's role as one of the catalysts for conversion of plasminogen to its active fibrinolytic form of plasmin.

Factor XII is also activated by endotoxins, especially lipid A in vitro. Experimental mouse models have suggested a role of FXII in multiple sclerosis.

== History ==
Hageman factor was first discovered in 1955 when a routine preoperative blood sample of the 37-year-old railroad brakeman John Hageman (1918) was found to have prolonged clotting time in test tubes, even though he had no hemorrhagic symptoms. Hageman was then examined by hematologist Oscar Ratnoff, who found that Hageman lacked a previously unidentified clotting factor. Ratnoff later found that the Hageman factor deficiency is an autosomal recessive disorder, after examining several related people who had the deficiency. Paradoxically, pulmonary embolism contributed to Hageman's death after an occupational accident in 1968. Since then, case studies and clinical studies identified an association between thrombosis and Factor XII deficiency. Hepatocytes express blood coagulation factor XII.

Currently produced QuikClot products, produced and marketed primarily for use in battlefield medicine to treat penetrating trauma (such as gunshot wounds and stab wounds), and other injuries that are known to commonly cause exsanguination (such as blast injury), are used with the overarching goal of increasing the time between the blood loss occurring, and the patient succumbing to the blood loss. The purpose of increasing this time is so that the patient may reach a higher level of medical care before succumbing from their injuries. These products use a kaolinite-based coating, applied to the bandages by the manufacturer before packaging and sale. This coating, when applied to an open wound via the application of the bandages, directly promotes blood clotting by activating Factor XII in the coagulation cascade. Also, due to the active ingredient nature of kaolinite, the activation of the Factor XII occurs in both an earlier amount of time than it otherwise would, and at an increased, more rapid rate than it otherwise would. This coating is widely considered amongst combat medics to be vastly superior to the older QuikClot powder formulation, which was poured into wounds, due to the fact that the older formulation used bead-form zeolite, a mineral which promotes the coagulation cascade, due to the fact that the reaction between the zeolite powder and the blood inside the wound site was an exothermic one, sometimes so intensely that it caused cases of second degree burns on the inside surface of the wound. This, obviously, caused extreme pain to the patient, often more-so than the initial injury was causing them at the time (assuming the patient was still conscious at the time of the application of the powder). This effect is often seen in movies and TV programs, with the QuikClot powder being poured into wounds, and the patient screaming out in pain as their wounds were violently burned on the inside surface of the wounds. This created a common misconception, which persists to this day, that commonly used QuikClot products still use this method of clot promotion (zeolite powder) to this day. However, zeolite-based clotting products are no longer widely used by militaries and police departments throughout the western world, as they have been widely supplanted by the kaolinite-based bandage products, which do not cause any exothermic reaction whatsoever, nor do they have the absolute-requirement of the application of the product exclusively to the inside-surface of the wound.
