= Robert J. Suhadolnik =

Robert J. Suhadolnik

Robert J. Suhadolnik (1925 −January 26, 2016 in Abington Township, Montgomery County, Pennsylvania) was an American biochemist known for his work with HIV, chronic fatigue syndrome, and antibiotics.

== Early life ==
Suhadolnik was born and raised in Forest City, Pennsylvania. He earned a bachelor's degree in chemistry from Pennsylvania State University in 1949, a master's in chemistry from Iowa State University in 1953, and a doctorate in biochemistry from Pennsylvania State University in 1956.

== Professional career ==
Suhadolnik served as Director of the Department of Bio-organic Chemistry at Albert Einstein Medical Center from 1960 or 1961 to 1974, where he led research into cancer and wrote two reference books on the biosynthesis of antibiotics. In 1974, he became a professor of biochemistry at Temple University, where his work led to the discovery of an enzymatic marker for chronic fatigue syndrome, countering the view that the syndrome was purely psychological.

Suhadolnik retired from Temple University in 2008; the Philadelphia Inquirer noted that his research continued to be funded for several years afterward, with "uninterrupted research grant support from 1961 to 2015 from the National Science Foundation and the National Institutes of Health".

=== Katalin Karikó ===
Suhadolnik played a crucial role in the scientific career of Katalin Karikó—awardee of the 2023 Nobel Prize in Medicine—on two separate occasions.

First, in 1985, he invited her to work for him at Temple, which was a necessary step in her immigration to the United States.

Second, (as reported in Gregory Zuckerman's 2021 A Shot to Save the World) in 1988, when Karikó accepted a job at Johns Hopkins University without first informing Suhadolnik of her intention to leave Temple, he told her that if she went to Johns Hopkins, he would have her deported. He then reported her to immigration authorities, claiming that she was "illegally" in the United States; in the time it took her to successfully challenge the resulting extradition order, Johns Hopkins withdrew their offer. Suhadolnik "continued bad-mouthing Karikó, making it impossible for her to get a new position" at other institutions, until she met a researcher at Bethesda Naval Hospital who "had his own difficult history with Suhadolnik". Karikó subsequently confirmed that the incident had happened as Zuckerman described, but emphasized that "more importantly I was always grateful to [Suhadolnik for] sending me the IAP66 form in 1985, for the opportunity he gave me to work in his lab", noting that "when I gave a lecture [at Temple, a] couple of years later, I thanked him for the science I learned from him."
