= Kornfeld =

Kornfeld is a German surname meaning "cornfield". Notable people with the surname include:

- Artie Kornfeld (born 1942), American musician, record producer and music executive
- Eberhard W. Kornfeld (1923–2023), Swiss auctioneer, gallerist, author, art dealer and collector
- Edmund Kornfeld (1919–2012), American organic chemist
- Herbert Kornfeld, fictional contributor to The Onion
- Joseph Saul Kornfeld (1876–1944), U.S. ambassador to Persia
- Julie Kornfeld, American epidemiologist and academic administrator
- Paul Kornfeld (playwright) (1889–1942), Czech-born writer
- Paul Kornfeld (swimmer) (born 1987), American swimmer
- Stuart Kornfeld (1936–2025), American hematologist and glycobiologist
- Zach Kornfeld (born 1990), American comedian, filmmaker and internet personality
- Zsigmond Kornfeld (1852–1909), Hungarian banker and baron

== See also ==
- Cornfeld
- Kornfield
- Cornfield (surname)
