= Leslie Cornfeld =

American political consultants

Leslie Cornfeld is an entrepreneur, educator, equity advocate, policy advisor as well as a public and private sector consultant. She currently leads a nonprofit that she founded to "drive opportunity at scale through innovation, collaboration and action". Cornfeld served as the Special Advisor for the President's My Brother's Keeper initiative to United States Secretaries of Education Arne Duncan and John King Jr. during the Obama administration. She was also a fellow with the Harvard Kennedy School of Government.

During the Bloomberg administration, Cornfeld was a public policy consultant and a two-term advisor for former Mayor Michael Bloomberg, and served as Chair of the Mayor's Interagency Task Force on Truancy, Chronic Absenteeism & School Engagement.

Cornfeld is also a former Federal Prosecutor, and served as Deputy Chief of the New York City Commission to Investigate Alleged Police Corruption (also known as "the Mollen Commission"). Cornfeld has contributed articles and opinion pieces to The New York Times, Newsweek, Newsday, and New York Law Journal, The Washington Post, The Huffington Post, and has made television appearances on Dateline NBC, Turning Point, and PBS/WNET. She speaks regularly at national conferences and summits. In addition, she has been featured on podcasts such as Education Next and interviewed recently about the National Education Equity Lab on CBS.

== Early life and education ==
Born in Hollywood, FL, Cornfeld is a graduate of Broward County public schools, Harvard College and Harvard Law School. She is a member of Phi Beta Kappa.

== Career ==
Cornfeld began her career as Special Assistant to United States Senator Daniel P. Moynihan in Washington, D.C. She also served as a law clerk to federal judge Pierre N. Leval of the United States District Court for the Southern District of New York before becoming a litigation associate at the law firm Paul, Weiss, Rifkind, Wharton & Garrison.

Cornfeld served as the Deputy Chief of the New York City Commission to Investigate Alleged Police Corruption (the "Mollen Commission"), where she supervised investigations of alleged police corruption and brutality, and the anti-corruption systems of the NYPD.

Cornfeld served as an Assistant U.S. Attorney and the Deputy Chief of the Civil Rights Division for the Eastern District of New York. As a federal prosecutor, Cornfeld led several public corruption and criminal civil rights cases from 1995 until 2002.

Following the highly publicized child abuse death of Nixzmary Brown, Cornfeld was appointed Director of the Mayor's Interagency Task Force on Child Welfare and Safety.

Cornfeld was appointed Chair of Mayor Michael Bloomberg's Interagency Task Force on Truancy, Chronic Absenteeism & School Engagement in June 2010.

A former senior Obama administration official, advising two U.S. Secretaries of Education and the White House for the President's My Brother's Keeper initiative from 2015 to 2017.

Ms. Cornfeld was a lecturer at the Harvard Kennedy School of Government from 2019 to 2020.

== Articles & Publications ==
- Green, Erica L. (2021-02-18). "A College Program for Disadvantaged Teens Could Shake Up Elite Admissions". The New York Times. ISSN 0362-4331. Retrieved 2022-03-06.
- Hawkins, Lee (2021-10-24). "Stanford Joins Group Offering Classes to Disadvantaged High-School Students". Wall Street Journal. ISSN 0099-9660. Retrieved 2022-03-06.
- "MBK Philly". MBK Philly. 2016-11-23. Retrieved 2022-03-06.
- Editorial Board (September 15, 2013). "School attendance gets a closer look". The Washington Post. Retrieved March 5, 2022.

== Awards ==
Cornfeld twice received the National U.S. Attorney General's Director's Award for Outstanding Performance as a U.S. Attorney, Washington, DC.

== Boards ==
Cornfeld has served as trustee on non-profit and other boards, including the Children's Defense Fund, Washington, DC for over a decade; the Dalton School in New York City; the Hospital for Special Surgery; the Massachusetts General Hospital Center for Law, Brain and Behavior, and is founder of a public speaking program Girls Speak! in East Harlem, where she serves as a coach and mentor. She has served on the Board of the NAACP Legal Defense Fund, the Alliance for Excellent Education, and recently served on the Brookings Institution Task Force on Next Gen Community Schools.
