= Drew Weissman =

American physician and immunologist (born 1959)

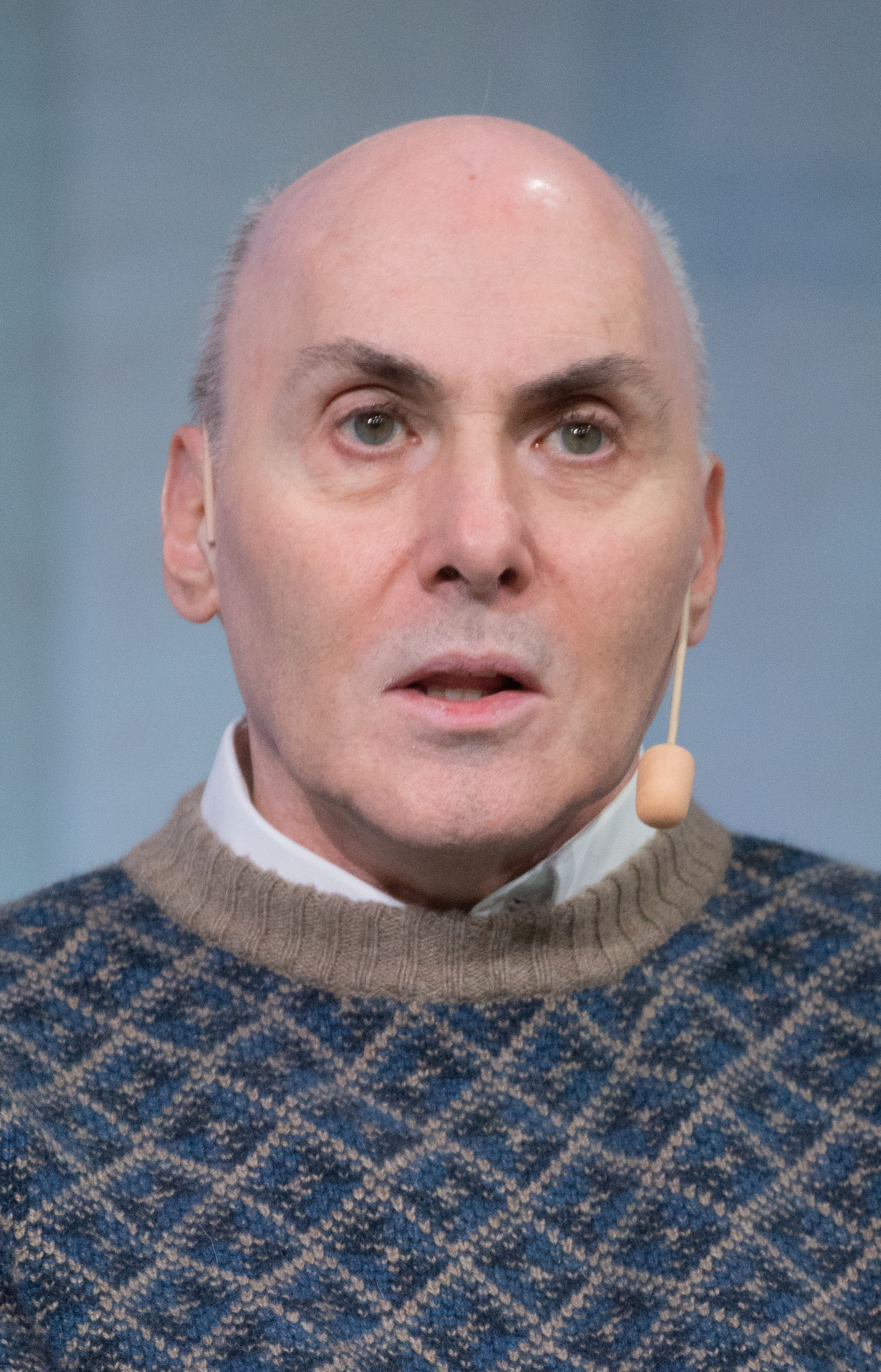
- Weissman at 2024 Nobel Week
- Born: September 7, 1959 (age 67); Lexington, Massachusetts, U.S.
- Education: Brandeis University (BA, MA); Boston University (MD, PhD)
- Known for: Modified mRNA technologies used in COVID-19 vaccines
- Awards: Rosenstiel Award (2020); Lasker–DeBakey Clinical Medical Research Award (2021); VinFuture Prize (2022); Breakthrough Prize in Life Sciences (2022); Mohammed bin Rashid Knowledge Award (2022); Harvey Prize (2023); Nobel Prize in Physiology or Medicine (2023)
- Scientific career
- Fields: Immunology
- Workplaces: University of Pennsylvania
- Thesis: Regulation of b lymphocytes with reagents that cross-link surface immunoglobulin (1987)
- Doctoral advisor: Ann Marshak-Rothstein

Drew Weissman (born September 7, 1959) is a Nobel Prize winning American physician and immunologist known for his contributions to RNA biology. Weissman is the inaugural Roberts Family Professor in Vaccine Research, director of the Penn Institute for RNA Innovation, and professor of medicine at the Perelman School of Medicine at the University of Pennsylvania (Penn).

Weissman's work underlies the development of mRNA vaccines, the best known of which are those for COVID-19 produced by BioNTech/Pfizer and Moderna. With biochemist Katalin Karikó, Weissman received the Nobel Prize in Physiology or Medicine in 2023 "for their discoveries concerning nucleoside base modifications that enabled the development of effective mRNA vaccines against COVID-19". Weissman has been a recipient and co-recipient of numerous awards, also including the prestigious Lasker–DeBakey Clinical Medical Research Award. In 2022, he was elected to the National Academy of Medicine and the American Academy of Arts and Sciences.

== Early life and education ==
Weissman was born in Lexington, Massachusetts, on September 7, 1959, to Hal and Adele Weissman. Hal is Jewish and Adele is Italian. While his mother did not convert to Judaism, he grew up celebrating all the Jewish holidays. He grew up in Lexington and attended Lexington High School, graduating in 1977.

Weissman received his B.A. and M.A. degrees from Brandeis University in 1981, where he majored in biochemistry and enzymology and he worked in the lab of Gerald Fasman. He performed his graduate work in immunology and microbiology to receive his M.D. and Ph.D. in 1987 at Boston University. Afterward, Weissman did a residency at Beth Israel Deaconess Medical Center, followed by a fellowship at the National Institutes of Health (NIH), under the supervision of Anthony Fauci, then director of the National Institute of Allergy and Infectious Diseases.

== Career ==
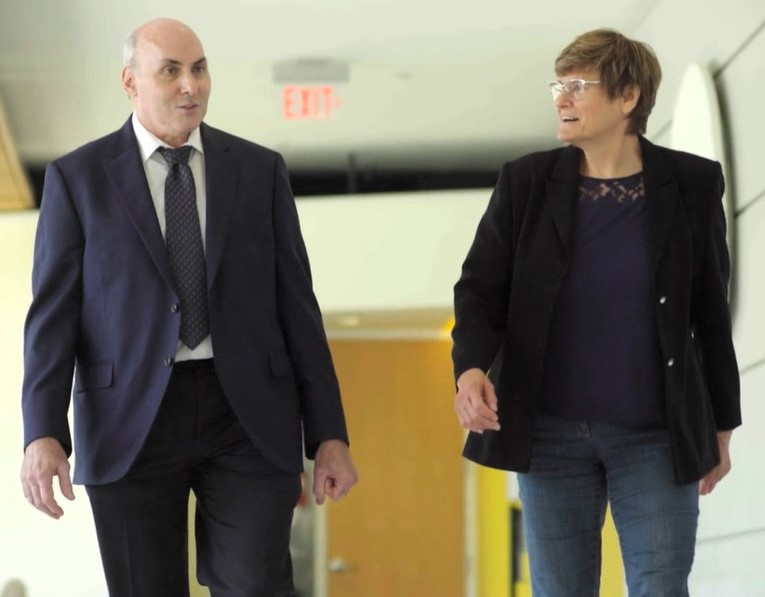
Weissman with Katalin Karikó in 2022

In 1997, Weissman moved to the University of Pennsylvania to start his laboratory in order to study RNA and innate immune system biology. He is now the Roberts Family Professor in Vaccine Research at the university.

At the university, Weissman, an immunologist studying vaccines, met his future colleague and collaborator Katalin Karikó at a photocopier, where they sympathized about the lack of funding for RNA research. At the time, Karikó had been trying RNA therapy on cerebral diseases and strokes. Immunologist Weissman began collaborating with biochemist Karikó, who switched her focus to the application of RNA technology to vaccines. Weissman's support was critical in helping Karikó to continue and extend her research. Slowly they began to move the technology forward, solving problems one at a time. On the difficulty of gaining funding and recognition for their work, Weissman has commented "We had to fight the entire way."

One of the major scientific obstacles they faced was that the RNA caused unwanted immune and inflammatory reactions as adverse side effects. Beginning in 2005, they published several landmark studies that used synthetic nucleosides to modify the RNA to prevent its degradation by the body. This breakthrough laid the groundwork for the use of RNA therapeutics, though the study received little attention at the time.

Weissman and Karikó overcame another major obstacle by developing a delivery technique to package the mRNA in lipid nanoparticles, a novel pharmaceutical drug delivery system for mRNA that protects the fragile molecule until it can reach the desired area of the body. They demonstrated the effectiveness of the delivery system in animals.

In 2006, Weissman and Karikó co-founded RNARx. Their objective was to develop novel RNA therapies. In 2020 their modified RNA technology became the key foundational component of the Pfizer/BioNTech and Moderna COVID-19 vaccines, which were deployed worldwide against the COVID-19 pandemic.

Weissman has been collaborating with scientists at Thailand's Chulalongkorn University, most recently to develop and provide COVID-19 vaccines for the country and neighboring low and middle income countries that may not have immediate access to the vaccine.

Weissman's laboratory continues to actively research the use of mRNA for next-generation vaccines, gene editing, and mRNA therapeutics. Projects include development of a pan coronavirus vaccines, gene editing technology to enable genes that produce missing antibodies, and treatments for acute inflammatory conditions. Weissman hopes that mRNA technology can be used to develop vaccines against influenza, herpes, and HIV.

== Recognition ==
For their mRNA-related work, Weissman and Karikó were awarded the 2023 Nobel Prize in Physiology or Medicine, the 2020 Rosenstiel Award, the Louisa Gross Horwitz Prize, the Albany Medical Center Prize, the Lasker-DeBakey Clinical Medical Research Award, and the BBVA Foundation Frontiers of Knowledge Award (also with Robert S. Langer).

Weissman obtained an honorary degree by the Drexel University College of Medicine. In 2021, he was awarded the Princess of Asturias Award in the category for Scientific Research. For 2022 he was awarded the Breakthrough Prize in Life Sciences, the Jessie Stevenson Kovalenko Medal of the NAS jointly with Katalin Karikó and also the Japan Prize In 2022 he received the Robert Koch Prize and the Tang Prize in Biopharmaceutical Science, the Golden Plate Award of the American Academy of Achievement, and was elected to the National Academy of Medicine and American Academy of Arts and Sciences. Furthermore in 2022, Weissman and Karikó were awarded the Novo Nordisk Prize and the Mohammed bin Rashid Knowledge Award for their roles in developing mRNA vaccine technology that enabled the development of mRNA-based COVID-19 vaccines. In 2023 he received the Harvey Prize of the Technion in Israel (awarded for the year 2021). In the same year, Weissman was awarded an honorary Doctor of Science (D.Sc.) degree from Boston University.

According to a report in The Washington Post, Weissman gets fan mail from people all over the world, thanking him for his work that made the COVID-19 vaccine possible — one said "You've made hugs and closeness possible again" — and asking him for a picture or his autograph.

His name was included with Kariko in Time 2024 list of influential people in health.

== Patents ==
Weissman is the co-inventor on several patents, including US8278036B2 and US8748089B2, both with his colleague Katalin Karikó, which detail the modifications required to make RNA suitable for vaccines and other therapies. Later, these patents were licensed to Gary Dahl, founder and CEO of Cellscript, who subsequently licensed the technology to Moderna and BioNTech to ultimately use in their COVID-19 vaccines.
