= Sándor Korányi =

Hungarian physician

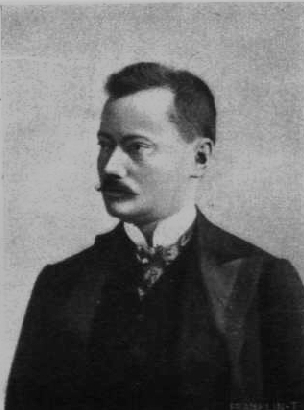
- Born: 18 June 1866; Pest, Hungary
- Died: 12 April 1944 (aged 77); Budapest, Hungary
- Scientific career
- Fields: Medicine
- Institutions: Budapest University

Baron Sándor Korányi de Tolcsva (Pest, 18 June 1866 – Budapest, 12 April 1944) was a Hungarian physician specializing in internal medicine, member of the Hungarian Academy of Sciences and House of Magnates.

He was the elder son of Frigyes Korányi, Sr. and brother of Frigyes Korányi, Jr. too. His mother was Malvin Bónis, of Calvinist Hungarian noble descent. He was nominated for the Nobel prize 13 times between 1901 and 1937.

== Publications ==
- Vizsgálatok a vizeletelválasztó rendszer működésére vonatkozóan ép és kóros viszonyok között (Magy. Orv. Archívum, 1894)
- Beiträge zur Theorie und Therapie der Niereninsuffizienz (Berliner klinische Wochenschrift, 1899)
- Physikalische Chemie und Medizin (co-author Richter P. F., I–II. Leipzig, 1907–08)
- A leukaemia kezelése benzollal (Orv. Hetit. 1912)
- Functionelle Pathologie und Therapie der Nierenkrankheiten (Berlin, 1929; in Hungarian: Bp., 1930)
- Élettan és orvosi tudomány (Orvosképzés, 1932)
- Az öregedésről (Orvosképzés, 1937).
