= Corn Field Raids of 1827–1828 =

Australian frontier conflict

Corn field raids 1827–1828
Location	South Bank, New Farm, and Kangaroo Point
Result	Indeterminate

Belligerents
United Kingdom of Great Britain and Ireland: (United Kingdom) Colony of New South Wales	Aboriginal groups

Commanders and leaders
(United Kingdom) King George IV (United Kingdom) Lieutenant General Sir Ralph Darling (United Kingdom) Captain Patrick Logan	Mulrobin (Mulrubin)

Strength
	400 estimated total South Brisbane Tribe

Casualties and losses
- Total Casualties: Unknown

The Corn Field Raids of 1827–1828 was a frontier conflict in the early Moreton Bay Penal Settlement. The conflict consisted of Aboriginal groups plundering and destruction of the maize fields in South Bank and Kangaroo Point. Potential motives for the raiders include the lack of the distinction between cultivated crops and available natural resources to the native inhabitants, the taking of the crop as partial compensation for the continuing occupation of the settlers and as a warning to prevent further expansion beyond the colony's current bounds.
