= Katalin Karikó =

Hungarian-American biochemist (born 1955)

- 2024 Portrait
- Born: 17 January 1955 (age 71); Szolnok, Hungary
- Other name: Kati Kariko
- Citizenship: Hungary; United States
- Education: University of Szeged (MSc, PhD)
- Known for: mRNA technology in immunology and therapies
- Spouse: Béla Francia
- Children: Susan Francia
- Awards: Nobel Prize in Physiology or Medicine (2023) and several others
- Scientific career
- Fields: Biochemistry; RNA technologies
- Workplaces: University of Szeged; Temple University; University of Pennsylvania; BioNTech

Katalin "Kati" Karikó (Note: Hungarian pronunciation: [ˌkɒtɒlin ˈkɒrikoː]) (born 17 January 1955) is a Hungarian and American biochemist who specializes in ribonucleic acid (RNA)-mediated mechanisms, particularly in vitro-transcribed messenger RNA (mRNA) for protein replacement therapy. Karikó laid the scientific groundwork for mRNA vaccines, overcoming major obstacles and skepticism in the scientific community. Karikó received the Nobel Prize in Physiology or Medicine in 2023 for her work, along with American immunologist Drew Weissman.

Karikó co-founded and was CEO of RNARx from 2006 to 2013. From 2013 to 2022, she was associated with BioNTech RNA Pharmaceuticals, first as a vice president and promoted to senior vice president in 2019. In 2022, she left BioNTech to devote more time to research. In 2021, she received an honorary doctorate from the University of Szeged in Hungary, where she has since become a professor. While Karikó has also been associated with the University of Pennsylvania, which would benefit financially from her eventual discovery, the university had actively discouraged her from pursuing research by underfunding and deprioritizing work on mRNA. After being demoted by the University of Pennsylvania in 1995, Karikó was never granted tenure and joined BioNTech in 2013 after the university had declined to reinstate her.

Karikó's work includes scientific research on RNA-mediated immune activation, resulting in the co-discovery with Drew Weissman of the nucleoside modifications that suppress the immunogenicity of RNA. This is seen as a further contribution to the therapeutic use of mRNA. Together with Weissman, she holds United States patents for the application of non-immunogenic, nucleoside-modified RNA. This technology has been licensed by BioNTech and Moderna to develop their protein replacement technologies, but it was also used for their COVID-19 vaccines.

The messenger RNA-based technology developed by Karikó and the two most effective vaccines based on it, BioNTech/Pfizer and Moderna, formed the basis for the effective and successful fight against SARS-CoV-2 virus worldwide and contributed significantly to the containment of the COVID-19 pandemic. For their work, Karikó and Weissman have received numerous other awards besides the Nobel, including the Lasker–DeBakey Clinical Medical Research Award, Time Magazine's Hero of the Year 2021, and the Tang Prize Award in Biopharmaceutical Science in 2022.

== Early life and education ==
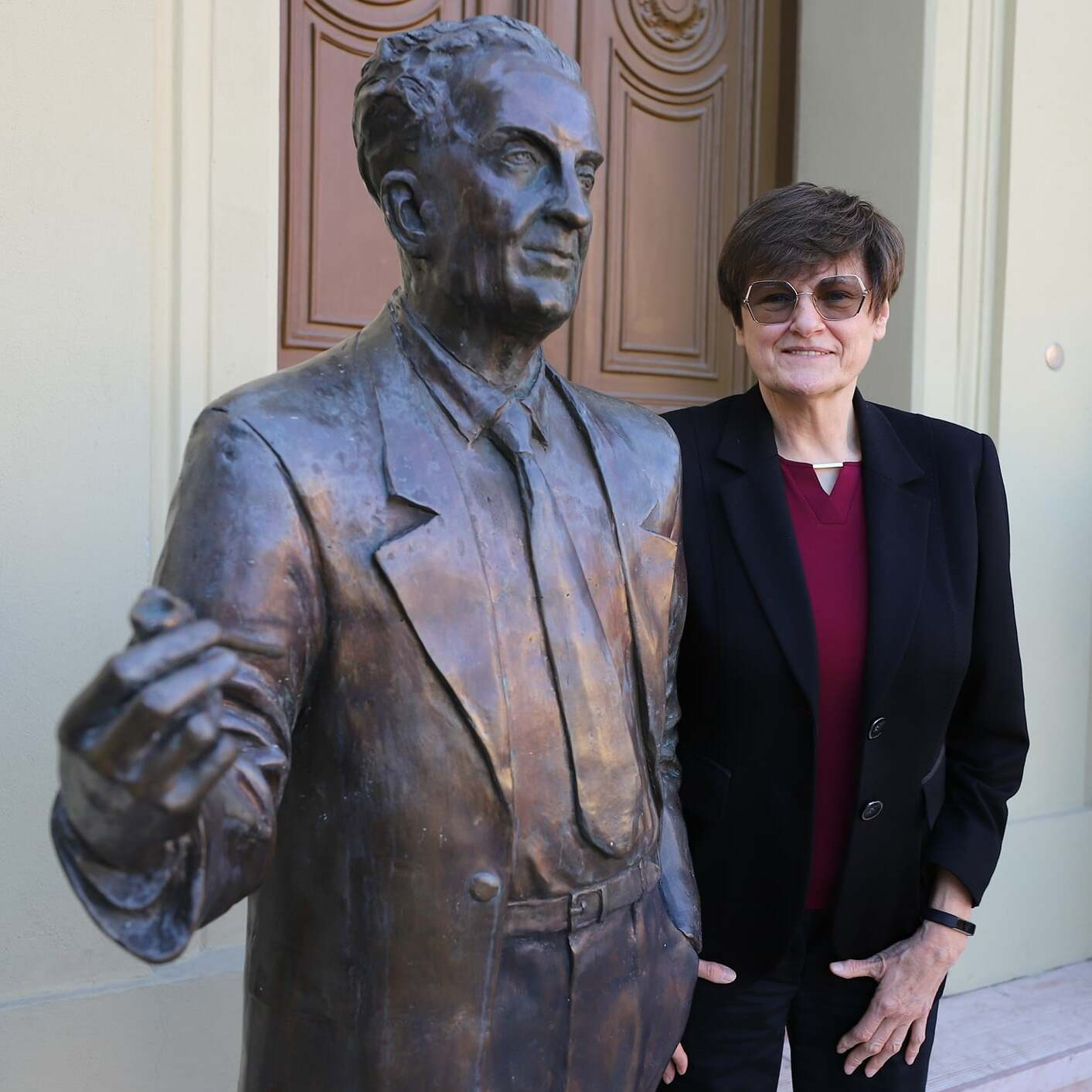
Karikó Katalin with a statue of Albert Szent-Györgyi, a fellow Nobel Prize in Physiology or Medicine winner, at the University of Szeged

Katalin Karikó was born in Szolnok, and grew up in Kisújszállás, Hungary, in a small home without running water, a refrigerator, or television. Her father János was a butcher, and her mother was a bookkeeper. Her father was punished for participating in the revolt of 1956. She excelled in science during her primary education, earning third place in Hungary in a biology competition.

A 2024 retrospective by the University of Szeged further documents Karikó's upbringing in Kisújszállás, Hungary, where her early passion for chemistry and biology was nurtured through academic competitions, achieving top national rankings by eighth grade. This foundation is recognized as a key influence on her later breakthroughs in mRNA research.

Karikó obtained a BSc degree in biology in 1978 and her PhD in biochemistry in 1982, both from the University of Szeged. She worked with Jenő Tomasz and continued her postdoctoral research at the Institute of Biochemistry, Biological Research Centre (BRC) of Hungary. From 1978 until 1985, she was listed as an intelligence asset by the Communist Hungarian secret police, something she says she was blackmailed into out of fear of repercussions on her career or reprisals against her father. She claims that she did not provide them with information nor was she active as an agent.

In 1985, her lab at the BRC lost its funding, and Karikó sought work at institutions in other countries. After being offered a research position by Robert J. Suhadolnik of Temple University, Karikó left Hungary for the United States with her husband and two-year-old daughter, carrying her daughter's teddy bear stuffed with £900 that they had received from selling their car and exchanging currency on the black market.

== Career ==
Between 1985 and 1988, Karikó was a postdoctoral fellow at Temple University in Philadelphia. Karikó participated in a clinical trial in which patients with AIDS, hematologic diseases, and chronic fatigue syndrome were treated with double-stranded RNA (dsRNA). This was considered groundbreaking research, as the molecular mechanism of interferon induction by dsRNA was not known, although the antiviral and antineoplastic effects of interferons were well-documented.

In 1988, Karikó accepted a job at Johns Hopkins University without first informing her lab advisor Suhadolnik of her intention to leave Temple, as recounted in Gregory Zuckerman's 2021 book A Shot to Save the World. Suhadolnik told her that if she went to Johns Hopkins, he would have her deported, and subsequently reported her to U.S. immigration authorities, claiming that she was "illegally" in the United States. In the time it took her to successfully challenge the resulting extradition order, Johns Hopkins withdrew the job offer. Suhadolnik "continued bad-mouthing Karikó, making it impossible for her to get a new position" at other institutions, until she met a researcher at Bethesda Naval Hospital who "had his own difficult history with Suhadolnik". Karikó subsequently confirmed that the incident had happened as Zuckerman described, but emphasized that "more importantly I was always grateful to [Suhadolnik for] sending me the IAP66 form in 1985, for the opportunity he gave me to work in his lab", noting that "when I gave a lecture [at Temple, a] couple of years later, I thanked him for the science I learned from him." From 1988 to 1989, she worked at the Uniformed Services University of the Health Sciences in Bethesda, Maryland where she worked with signal protein interferons.

In 1989, she was hired by the University of Pennsylvania to work with cardiologist Elliot Barnathan on messenger RNA (mRNA). In 1990, while an adjunct professor at the Perelman School of Medicine at the University of Pennsylvania, Karikó submitted her first grant application in which she proposed establishing mRNA-based gene therapy. Ever since, mRNA-based therapy has been Karikó's primary research interest. However, in the 1990s, mRNA fell out of favor as many researchers, biotechs, and pharmaceutical companies doubted its potential. Though supported by Elliot Barnathan (who left UPenn in 1997) and David Langer (who then hired her), Karikó found it difficult to gain funding. She was initially on track to become a full professor, but after repeated grant rejections the university demoted her in 1995. Nevertheless, she chose to remain and continue her mRNA research.

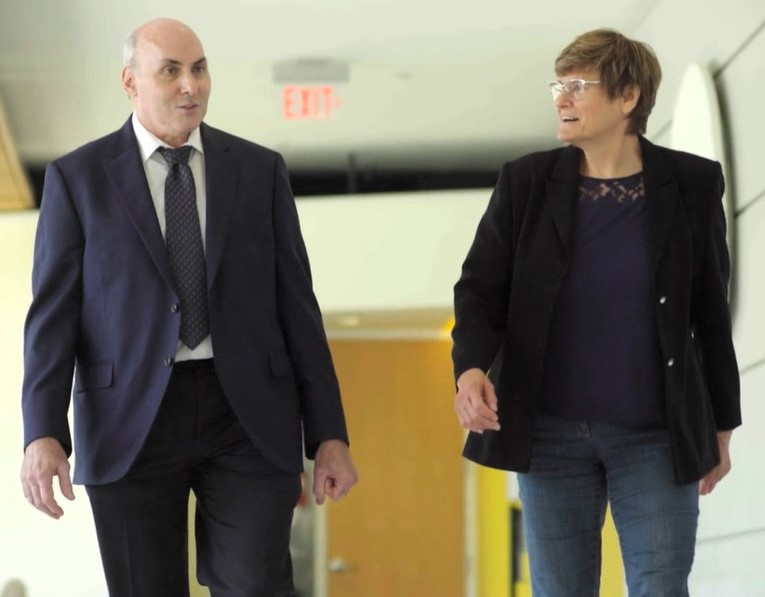
Karikó (right) with Drew Weissman in 2022

In 1997, she met Drew Weissman, a professor of immunology who had recently arrived at the University of Pennsylvania. They began to exchange ideas and then to collaborate. Weissman's funding was critical in helping Karikó to continue and extend her research and the combination of Weissman's immunology and Karikó's biochemistry was extremely effective. They began to move the technology forward, solving problems one at a time, and eventually gaining recognition. Weissman has commented "We had to fight the entire way." Karikó's persistence was noted as exceptional against the norms of academic research work conditions.

Kate was really just unbelievable... She was always incredibly inquisitive. She read voraciously. She would always know the latest technology or the latest paper, even if it was in a totally different area, and she'd put two and two together and say, 'Well why don't we do this?' Or, 'Why don't we try this formulation?'

— Elliot Barnathan

Before 2005, a major problem with the proposed therapeutic use of mRNA was that in vivo use led to inflammatory reactions. A key insight came about when Karikó focused on why transfer RNA (tRNA), used as a control in an experiment, did not provoke the same immune reaction as mRNA. A series of landmark studies beginning in 2005 demonstrated that while synthetic mRNA was highly inflammatory, tRNA was noninflammatory. Karikó and Weissman determined how specific nucleoside modifications in mRNA led to a reduced immune response: by replacing uridine with pseudouridine. Their key finding of a chemical modification of mRNA to render it non-immunogenic was rejected by the journals Nature and Science, but eventually accepted by the publication Immunity.

Another important achievement by the researchers was the development of a delivery technique to package the mRNA in lipid nanoparticles, a novel pharmaceutical drug delivery system for mRNA. The mRNA is injected into tiny fat droplets (lipid nanoparticles) which protect the fragile molecule until it can reach the desired area of the body. They demonstrated its effectiveness in animals.

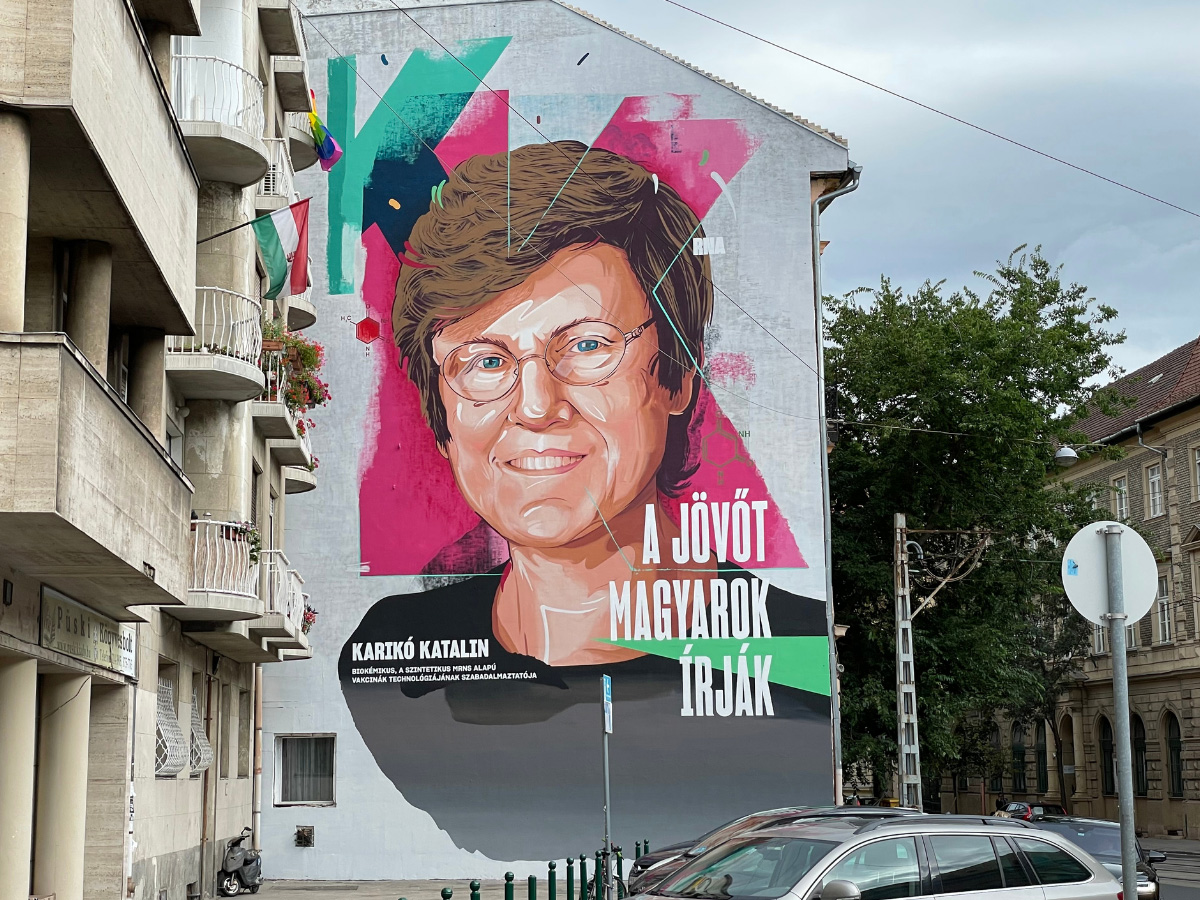
Katalin Karikó wall painting in Budapest, Hungary

Karikó and Weissman founded a small company, RNARx, and in 2006 and 2013 received patents for the use of several modified nucleosides to reduce the antiviral immune response to mRNA. Soon afterward, the University of Pennsylvania sold the intellectual property license to Gary Dahl, the head of a lab supply company that eventually became Cellscript. Weeks later, Flagship Pioneering, the venture capital company backing Moderna, contacted her in an attempt to license the patent, at which point Karikó had to tell them it was no longer available.

In 2006, Katalin Karikó reached out to biochemist Ian MacLachlan to work with him on the chemically altered mRNA. Initially, MacLachlan and Tekmira turned away from the collaboration. Karikó wanted to team up with Ian MacLachlan because he was the leader of a team that helped advance mRNA technology. Karikó was working on establishing the formulated lipid nanoparticle delivery system that encapsulates mRNA in a dense particle through a mixing process.

In early 2013, Karikó heard of Moderna's $240 million deal with AstraZeneca to develop a Vascular endothelial growth factor mRNA. Karikó realized that she would not get a chance to apply her experience with mRNA at the University of Pennsylvania, so she took a role as vice president at BioNTech RNA Pharmaceuticals (and subsequently became a senior vice president in 2019), while maintaining an adjunct professorship at the university.

During Nobel Week 2023, Karikó remarked in an interview, "I dreamt about doing research, not getting an award," emphasizing her lifelong dedication to discovery over recognition and the central role of perseverance in her scientific path.

In November 2024, Karikó returned to Temple University's Hill College House and delivered a public lecture recounting her Nobel Prize experience including the iconic early morning notification and encouraging students to pursue research with persistence and enthusiasm.

Then in May 2025, Karikó delivered the prestigious Mendel Lecture at the European Society of Human Genetics Annual Meeting, where she discussed clinical applications of mRNA therapeutics and reflected on the collaborative efforts that enabled rapid COVID‑19 vaccine development.

As of October 2023, Karikó is a professor at University of Szeged in Hungary.

== Scientific contributions ==
Karikó's research and its specializations have a broad impact with potential implications for areas such as the generation of pluripotent stem cells, and messenger RNA-based gene therapy, as well as "a new class of drugs".

Karikó's work laid the foundation for BioNTech and Moderna to create therapeutic mRNAs that do not induce an immune response. In 2020, Karikó and Weissman's technology was used in vaccines for COVID-19 produced by BioNTech and its partner Pfizer and by Moderna. The mRNA vaccines were developed and approved for use at unprecedented speed, and demonstrated over 90% efficacy. In addition to vaccines for infectious diseases, mRNA has potential applications in treatment of some cancers, cardiovascular, and metabolic diseases including ischemia.

== Awards and honors ==
Karikó has received more than 130 international awards and honors for her pioneering and globally significant work in biochemistry.

The Nobel Assembly at the Karolinska Institute announced on 2 October 2023, that the 2023 Nobel Prize in Physiology and Medicine was awarded to Katalin Karikó and Drew Weissman for the development of mRNA technology.

Katalin Karikó donated the more than half a million dollars she received from her Nobel Prize to her former alma mater, the University of Szeged on 16 April 2024.

In 2022, Karikó was awarded VinFuture Grand Prize from the VinFuture Foundation.

In 2022, Karikó was awarded The Novo Nordisk Prize along with Drew Weissman for their pioneering forces for more than a decade in discovering a nucleoside-modified form of mRNA.

In 2023, Karikó was inducted into the National Inventors Hall of Fame for her research into messenger RNA.

Karikó was named in the 2024 Time 100 influential people in health.

In June 2024, Karikó received the Paul Karrer Medal from the University of Zurich.

In December 2024, Katalin Karikó was included on the BBC's 100 Women list.

In May 2025, Karikó was elected to the US National Academy of Sciences in recognition of her pioneering contributions to mRNA vaccine research.

Starting in 2026, she has served as a member of the Advisory Board to Hungary's Minister of Health, Zsolt Hegedűs. She was also named to Forbes Hungary's "50 Most Influential Hungarian Women, 2026" list.

== Personal life ==
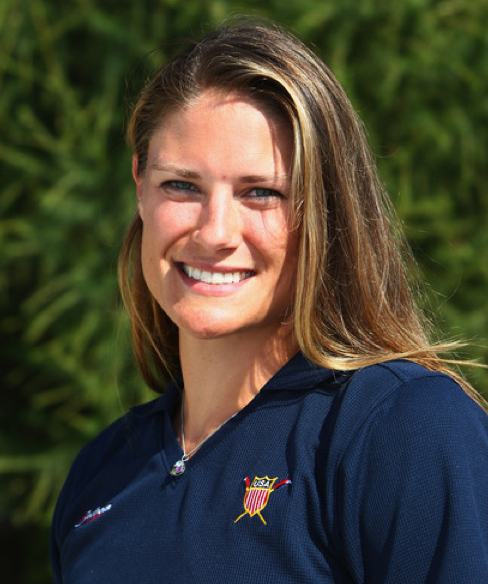
Karikó's daughter Susan Francia

Karikó is married to Béla Francia, and they are the parents of two-time Olympic gold medalist rower Susan Francia. Their grandson was born in the U.S. in February 2021 to their daughter and son-in-law, architect Ryan Amos.

== Media visibility and memoir ==
In April 2021, The New York Times featured her career, which laid the groundwork for mRNA vaccines to fight the COVID-19 pandemic.

On 10 June 2021, The Daily podcast from The New York Times highlighted Karikó's career, emphasizing the many challenges she had to overcome before her work was recognized.

In November 2021, the US online publication Glamour named her a Woman of the Year.

In 2023, two children's books were released about her: Never Give Up: Dr. Kati Karikó and the Race for the Future of Vaccines, by Debbie Dadey and Juliana Oakley, and Kati's Tiny Messengers: Dr. Katalin Karikó and the Battle Against COVID-19, by Megan Hoyt and Vivien Mildenberger.

Katalin Karikó's autobiography was published by Crown Publishing Group on 10 October 2023, just days after she won the Nobel Prize. It is titled Breaking Through: My Life in Science. The book became the best-selling non-fiction book in Hungary in 2023, and was awarded the Libri Literary Prize in June 2024 and the ASIMOV Prize in May 2025. By this time, her memoir had been translated into 9 languages. In 2026, a one-person play titled Karikó was created based on the book.

Karikó's book Breaking Through: My Life in Science has been published in the following editions:

- Breaking Through. My Life in Science; Penguin Random House, New York, 2023
- Áttörések. Életem és a tudomány; ford. Fenyvesi Anna; Helikon, Budapest, 2023
- Breaking Through. My Life in Science; The Bodley Head, London, 2024
- Nonostante tutto. La mia vita nella scienza; Bollati Boringhieri, Torino, 2024
- 突破：我的科學人生; 譯林出版社, 2024
- Rompiendo Barreras: Mi Vida Dedicada a la Ciencia; Geoplaneta, Barcelona, 2024
- 終止病毒浩劫的女力英雄; 方言文化出版事業有限公司, 2024
- Durchbruch: Mein Leben für die Forschung; btb Verlag, München, 2024
- ブレイクスルー ノーベル賞科学者カタリン・カリコ自伝; 河出書房新社, 2024
- Ne jamais renoncer: Vaccins ARN, Covid : L'autobiographie de la femme qui a sauvé des millions de vies; Quanto, Lausanne, 2024
- 돌파의 시간 mRNA로 세상을 바꾼 커털린 커리코의 삶과 과학; 까치, 서울시, 2024
- Prelomno otkriće: Moj život u nauci; Službeni glasnik, Београд, 2025
- Đột phá: cuộc đời khoa học của tôi; Dân Trí, Hanoi, 2025
- 2025, رهگشایی (زندگی من در دنیای علم)
- Dincolo de granite; ford.: Iulia Renata Sîrbu; Prior Media, Bukarest, 2026

== Selected publications ==
- Şahin, Uğur; Muik, Alexander; Evelyna Derhovanessian; et al. (2020). "COVID-19 vaccine BNT162b1 elicits human antibody and TH1 T-cell responses". Nature. doi:10.1038/s41586-020-2814-7. PMID 32998157. Wikidata Q100392375.
- Şahin, Uğur; Karikó, Katalin; Türeci, Özlem (2014). "mRNA-based therapeutics--developing a new class of drugs" (PDF). Nature Reviews Drug Discovery. 13 (10): 759–780. doi:10.1038/nrd4278. PMID 25233993. S2CID 27454546. Wikidata Q38252360.
- Anderson, Bart; Muramatsu, Hiromi; Subba R Nallagatla; Bevilacqua, Philip; Sansing, Lauren; Weissman, Drew; Karikó, Katalin (2010). "Incorporation of pseudouridine into mRNA enhances translation by diminishing PKR activation". Nucleic Acids Research. 38 (17): 5884–5892. doi:10.1093/nar/gkq347. PMC 2943593. PMID 20457754. Wikidata Q34146278.
- Karikó, Katalin; Muramatsu, Hiromi; Frank A Welsh; János Ludwig; Hiroki Kato; Akira, Shizuo; Weissman, Drew (2008). "Incorporation of pseudouridine into mRNA yields superior nonimmunogenic vector with increased translational capacity and biological stability". Molecular Therapy. 16 (11): 1833–1840. doi:10.1038/mt.2008.200. PMC 2775451. PMID 18797453. Wikidata Q37416925.
- Karikó, Katalin; Michael Buckstein; Houping Ni; Weissman, Drew (2005). "Suppression of RNA recognition by Toll-like receptors: the impact of nucleoside modification and the evolutionary origin of RNA". Immunity. 23 (2): 165–75. doi:10.1016/j.immuni.2005.06.008. PMID 16111635. Wikidata Q24316383.
- Karikó, Katalin; Weissman, Drew; Frank A Welsh (2004). "Inhibition of toll-like receptor and cytokine signaling--a unifying theme in ischemic tolerance". Journal of Cerebral Blood Flow & Metabolism. 24 (11): 1288–1304. doi:10.1097/01.wcb.0000145666.68576.71. PMID 15545925. Wikidata Q35951508.
- Karikó, Katalin; Houping Ni; John Capodici; Marc Lamphier; Weissman, Drew (2004). "mRNA is an endogenous ligand for Toll-like receptor 3". Journal of Biological Chemistry. 279 (13): 12542–12550. doi:10.1074/jbc.m310175200. PMID 14729660. Wikidata Q34290592.
- Katalin Karikó; Breaking Through: My Life in Science (autobiography), 10 October 2023, Crown Publishing Group, translated in over 9 languages. English edition: ISBN 978-0-593-44316-3

== See also ==
- Tozinameran – COVID-19 vaccine from Pfizer BioNTech, sold under the brand name Comirnaty
- Uğur Şahin – German oncologist and immunologist (born 1965), co-founder of BioNTech
- Özlem Türeci – German physician and scientist (born 1967), co-founder of BioNTech
