= Louis Nékám =

Hungarian dermatologist

Lajos Sándor Nékám or Louis Nékám (June 4, 1868 – January 29, 1957) was a Hungarian dermatologist.

== Selected publications ==
- Neurofibroma multiplex. Budapest, 1893
- Dolgozatok a fővárosi bakteriologiai intézetből. Budapest, 1897
- Über die leukaemischen Erkrankungen der Haut. Hamburg, 1899
- Magyar orvosi Vademecum. Budapest, 1902
- Corpus Iconum Morborum Cutaneorum. Budapest, 1938
