= Protein replacement therapy =

Protein replacement therapy is a medical treatment that supplements or replaces a protein in patients in whom that particular protein is deficient or absent. There have been significant advances in this treatment. PRT is being tested in clinical trials with the diseases progeria and epidermolysis bullosa dystrophica as a potential treatment. For patients with epidermolysis bullosa dystrophica there have been promising results.

== See also ==
- Enzyme replacement therapy
- Gene therapy
