= Frigyes Korányi (politician) =

Hungarian politician

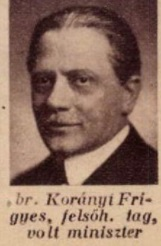

Minister of Finance of Hungary
- In office 12 September 1919 – 16 December 1920
- Prime Minister: István Friedrich; Károly Huszár; Sándor Simonyi-Semadam; Pál Teleki
- Preceded by: János Grünn
- Succeeded by: Lóránt Hegedüs
- In office 25 March 1924 – 15 December 1924
- Prime Minister: István Bethlen
- Preceded by: Lajos Walko
- Succeeded by: János Bud
- In office 16 December 1931 – 1 October 1932
- Preceded by: Gyula Károlyi
- Succeeded by: Béla Imrédy

Personal details
- Born: 21 June 1869 Pest, Austria-Hungary
- Died: 26 December 1935 (aged 66) Budapest, Kingdom of Hungary
- Party: FKGP, Unity Party
- Profession: politician, economist

Baron Frigyes Korányi de Tolcsva (21 June 1869 – 26 December 1935) was a Hungarian politician, who served as Minister of Finance at three times: from 1919 to 1920, in 1924, and from 1931 to 1932. His father was the internist Frigyes Korányi. His mother was Malvin Bónis, of Calvinist Hungarian noble descent. Korányi Jr. graduated in Budapest and other universities in Europe. He served as the general manager of the National Central Credit Co-operative from 1912. In 1922 he joined to the Unity Party, which controlled Hungary during the Regency. Between 1923 and 1924 he was the ambassador to France, after his second short ministership he returned to this position.

In 1928 he was appointed to lead of the Banking Centre. After that he served as Minister of Finance again. He became a member of the House of Magnates in 1932. Korányi also dealt with literature in his spare time: he wrote plays and novels, for example Hajnalhasadás (Sunrise) - 1900.

Political offices
Preceded by János Grünn	Minister of Finance; 1919–1920	Succeeded by Lóránt Hegedüs
Preceded by Lajos Walko	Minister of Finance; 1924	Succeeded by János Bud
Preceded by Gyula Károlyi	Minister of Finance; 1931–1932	Succeeded by Béla Imrédy
