= Frigyes Korányi (physician) =

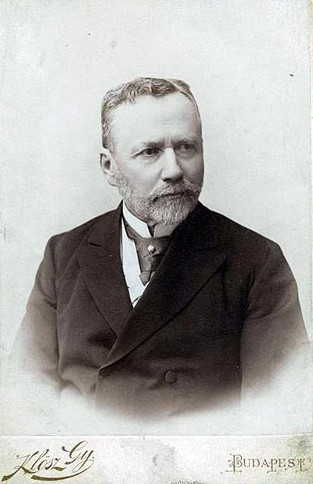
- Born: 20 December 1828; Nagykálló, Hungary
- Died: 13 May 1913 (aged 84); Budapest, Hungary
- Known for: Korányi's sign
- Scientific career
- Fields: Medicine
- Institutions: Budapest University

Baron Frigyes Korányi de Tolcsva (Kornfeld; Nagykálló, 20 December 1828 – Budapest, 13 May 1913) was a Hungarian physician specializing in internal medicine, especially pulmonary medicine. The Korányi's sign is named after him.

He was the father of Frigyes Korányi, Jr., a Hungarian politician and Minister of Finance, and of the physician Sándor Korányi. The family was originally named Kornfeldt and was Jewish, but in connection and actively participating in the nationalistic Hungarian Revolution of 1848, the whole family changed name to Korányi and converted to Roman Catholicism.
