= Television in Hungary =

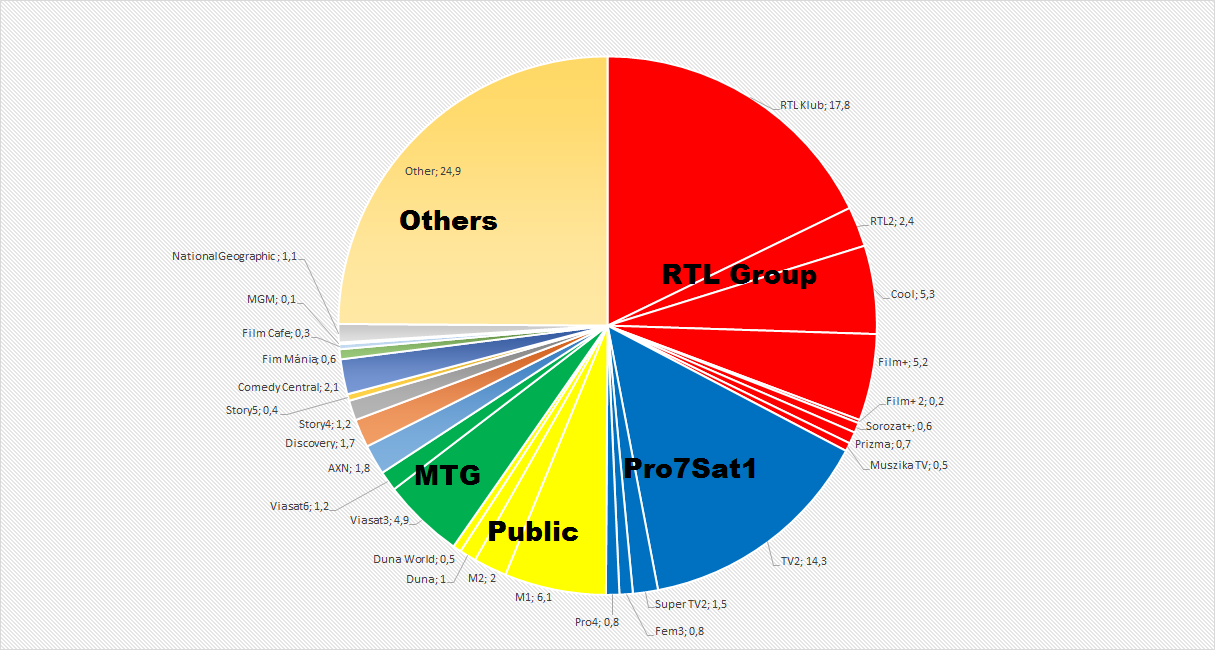
Audience shares of Hungarian TV channels, 2012

Television in Hungary was introduced in 1957. Transmission in colour was introduced to Hungarian television for the first time in 1971. Hungary had only one television channel until 1973. It was only in the mid 1990s when private and commercial broadcasting was introduced to Hungary.

== History ==
The history of Hungarian television began on December 16, 1953, with the start of test broadcasts by Magyar Televízió. Experimental color broadcasts appeared in 1969, but the full transition to color did not occur until the early 1970s. MTV2, the second television channel, was launched in 1973.

The Magyar Televízió, which became independent in 1974, began building regional studios in the second half of the decade. From the 1980s onwards, due to the lack of a regional approach, they did not receive sufficient support, and the regional studio network could not be reorganized after the change of regime (the regional studios were eventually closed down in 2011).

By the second half of the 1990s, the first media law was passed, which created a dual (public service and commercial) media space. The two largest national TV channels in Hungary became TV2 and RTL. Public service television was unable to prepare for the challenges faced by commercial televisions, while also needing continuous financial assistance. Its viewership soon plummeted, and two new national commercial channels (TV2 and RTL) and their owners dominate a significant part of the Hungarian TV market today.

== Hungarian channels by groups ==
=== Hungarian Radio and Television (MRTV) ===
- DUNA: 0-24: National main channel of Hungary, since March 15, 2015, started in 1992. Available in HD.
- M1: 0-24: National main channel of Hungary, since 1 May 1957. Available in HD.
- M2 / M2 Petőfi: 6-20: Kids channel since December 22, 2012, 20-6: Entertainment since March 15, 2015, started in 1973. Available in HD.
- M4 Sport: 0-24: Sport channel started in 2015. Available in HD.
- M5: 0-24: Started on August 6, 2016, as sport channel, (also called M5 Sport) because of the Rio Olympics 2016 and Rio Paralympics 2016, as cultural channel since September 18, 2016. (It was planned as a regional channel.) Available in HD.
- Duna World: International channel of Hungary, since April 16, 2006. Available in HD.

=== RTL Magyarország (RTL Group) ===
- RTL: The most popular commercial channel in Hungary.
- RTL Kettő: Comedy series
- RTL Három: Movies
- RTL Gold: Classic series
- Cool: Movies and series
- Film+: Movies
- Sorozat+: Series
- Muzsika TV: Music
- RTL Otthon: Interior design, gastronomy
- Kölyökklub: Cartoons, Kids programs
- Moziklub: Movies
- Sorozatklub: Series

=== TV2 Group ===
- TV2: One of main commercial channel in Hungary.
- FEM3: Programs for women
- Izaura TV: Telenovelas
- Mozi+: Movies
- Super TV2: premium series
- Spíler 1, Spíler 2: Sports and programs for men
- TV2 Kids: Cartoons, kids programs
- TV2 Séf: Gastronomy
- TV2 Comedy: Comedy series
- Jocky TV: Classic series
- PRIME: series
- Moziverzum: Movies
- Zenebutik: Music

== National Channels ==
- Duna: Main national channel, started broadcasting on 24 December 1992 (Free-to-air on DVB-T).
- Duna World: International channel, started broadcasting on 16 April 2006 (Free-to-air on DVB-T).
- M1: Main national channel, started broadcasting on 1 May 1957 (Free-to-air on DVB-T).
- M2: Kids channel between 6:00 am and 8:00 pm since 22 December 2012, M2 Petőfi between 8:00 pm and 6:00 am on 15 March 2015, started broadcasting on 7 November 1973 (Free-to-air on DVB-T).
- M3: Entertainment channel, started broadcasting on 20 December 2013, closed as a TV channel on 1 May 2019 (Free-to-air on DVB-T).
- M4 Sport: Sports channel, started broadcasting on 18 July 2015. (Free-to-air on DVB-T).
- M5: Cultural channel since 18 September 2016, started broadcasting 6 August 2016 (Free-to-air on DVB-T).

== National commercial channels ==
- TV2: Main channel, started broadcasting on 4 October 1997 (Free-to-air on DVB-T).
- RTL: Main channel, started test broadcasting as RTL Klub on 7 October 1997 and officially on 27 October 1997 (Free-to-air on DVB-T).

=== National commercial premium channels ===
- Super TV2 (Also available on DVB-T2)
- RTL Kettő (Also available on DVB-T2)

== Cable channels ==
=== General and entertainment ===
- Viasat 2
- Viasat 3 (Also available on DVB-T2)
- TV4
- Cool TV (Also available on DVB-T2)
- AXN (Also available on DVB-T2)
- Viasat 6
- AXN Crime
- Max4
- RTL Három
- TV2 Comedy
- Galaxy4
- RTL Gold

=== News and politics ===
- Hír TV (Also available on DVB-T)
- ATV (Also available on DVB-T and in HD quality on cable TV / IPTV / satellite connection)
- ATV Extra
- EuroNews

=== Sport ===
- Sport 1 (HD) (Also available on DVB-T)
- Sport 2 (HD) (Also available on DVB-T2)
- Extreme Sports Channel
- Eurosport 1 (HD)
- Eurosport 2 (HD)
- Spíler1 TV (HD)
- Spíler2 TV (HD)
- Arena4 (HD)
- Match4 (HD)

=== Movies ===
- Film+ (Also available on DVB-T)
- Mozi+ (Also available on DVB-T)
- Moziklub
- Moziverzum
- Film4
- Film Cafe

=== Series and telenovelas ===
- Sorozat+ (Also available on DVB-T2)
- Sorozatklub
- Izaura TV (Also available on DVB-T2)
- Story4
- PRIME
- Jocky TV

=== Documentary ===
- Discovery (Also available on DVB-T2)
- Investigation Discovery
- National Geographic (Also available on DVB-T2)
- BBC Earth
- Viasat History (Also available on DVB-T2)
- Viasat Explore
- HISTORY
- Fit TV

=== Animals ===
- Animal Planet (Also available on DVB-T2)
- Nat Geo Wild (Also available on DVB-T2)
- Viasat Nature
- Love Nature (HD)

=== Travel and lifestyle ===
- FEM3
- Travel Channel
- Travelxp (HD)
- HGTV
- Fashion TV

=== Culinary ===
- TV Paprika (Also available on DVB-T2)
- TV2 Séf
- RTL Otthon
- Food Network

=== Children & families ===
- Minimax (Also available on DVB-T2)
- Jim Jam (Also available on DVB-T2)
- Nickelodeon (Also available on DVB-T2)
- Nick Jr. (Also available on DVB-T2)
- Nicktoons (Also available on DVB-T2)
- Cartoon Network (Also available on DVB-T2)
- Cartoonito (Also available on DVB-T2)
- Disney Channel (Also available on DVB-T2)
- TV2 Kids
- Kölyökklub

=== Music ===
- MTV
- UTV (Free-to-air on satellite, only on Digi TV)
- Stingray CMusic
- Stingray iConcerts
- Zenebutik
- Sláger TV
- Muzsika TV

=== Regional ===
- Local TV channels in Hungary

=== Adult ===
- Dorcel TV
- Hustler TV

== HD TV-Channels ==
- RTL HD
- TV2 HD
- M1 HD
- M2 HD
- M4 Sport HD
- M5 HD
- Duna HD
- Duna World HD
- M4 Sport+ HD
- Cool HD
- RTL Kettő HD
- RTL Otthon HD
- Super TV2 HD
- Spíler 2 HD
- Mozi+ HD
- TV4 HD
- Film4 HD
- Arena4 HD
- Match4 HD
- ATV HD
- Animal Planet HD
- TLC HD
- AXN HD
- SPORT1 HD
- SPORT2 HD
- HBO HD
- HBO2 HD
- HBO3 HD
- Cinemax HD
- Cinemax 2 HD
- AMC HD
- TV Paprika HD
- Discovery HD

== Free-to-air television channels broadcasting in Hungary ==
=== Free-to-air on DVB-T ===
- Duna HD
- Duna World HD
- M1 HD
- M2 HD
- M4 Sport HD
- M5 HD
- RTL
- TV2
- Spectrum Home+
- Max4
- plus Local channels

=== Free-to-air on analogue ===
Analogue broadcasting in Hungary was phased out in two phases that were completed on July 31 and October 31, 2013, respectively.

- M1
- TV2
- RTL Klub
- plus Local channels

=== Free-to-air on satellite ===
- Duna
- Duna World
- M1
- M2
- M4 Sport
- M5

== Defunct or renamed ==
- Paramount Channel renamed as Paramount Network
- Discovery Showcase HD
- only in Hungary
- Megamax
- Sport M
- M3 Anno only as m3.hu (webTV)
- Digi Film renamed as FilmNOW
- Digi Life
- Digi World
- Digi Animal World
- AXN White replaced by Sony Max
- replaced by Sony Movie Channel
- renamed as Viasat Film
- renamed as AXN Crime
- renamed as
- Cartoon Network Too
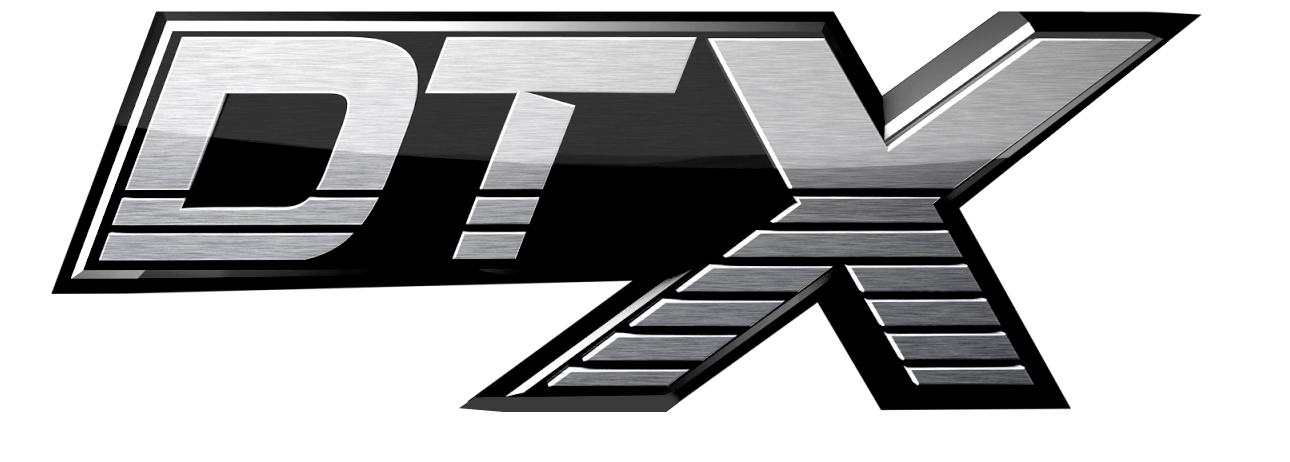
- Discovery World renamed as
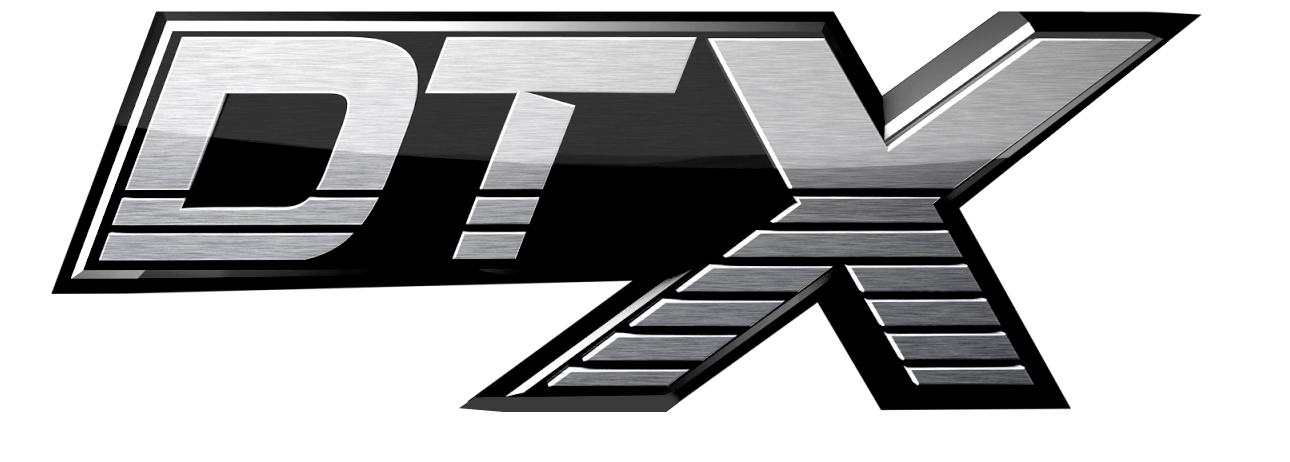
- Discovery Civilization Channel
- renamed as
- TV6 renamed as Viasat 6
- renamed as AXN Black
- renamed as AXN White
- renamed as
- FEM TV renamed as
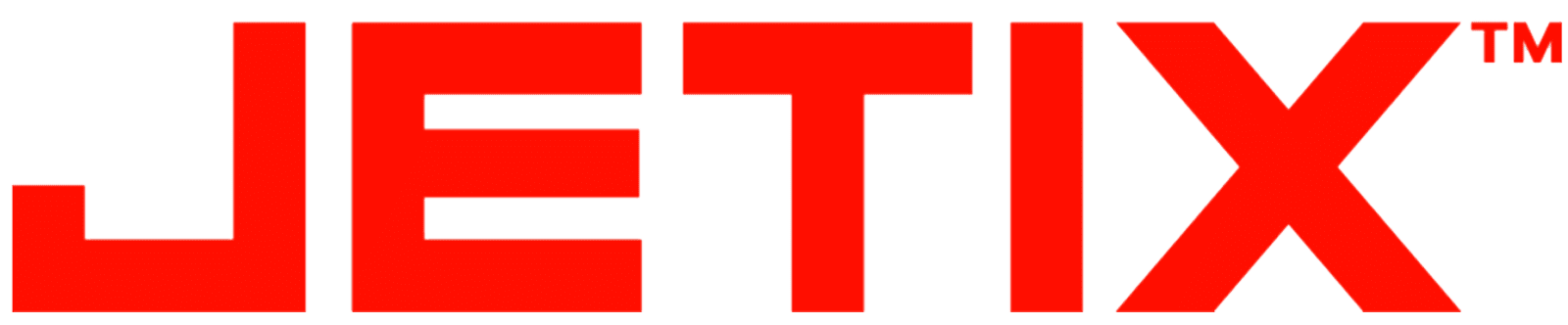
- renamed as
- Hálózat TV
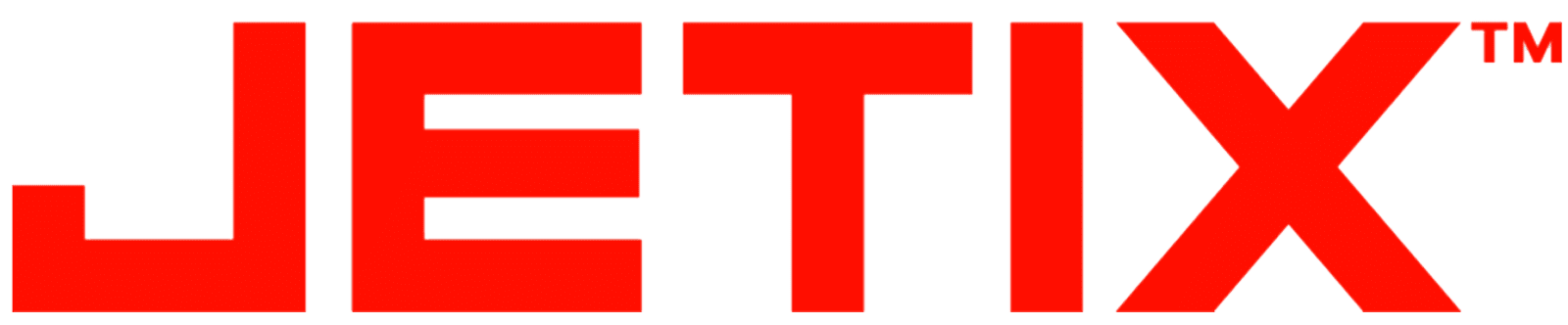
- renamed as
- Meteo TV
- MGM replaced by AMC
- TV3 renamed as
- renamed as TV2 Klub
- renamed as
- Private Spice
- Zone Club
- renamed as CBS Reality
- Zone Europa
- Zone Romantica renamed as Film Cafe
- BBC Entertainment
- Gala TV
- TV1
- TV2
- MTV Rocks
- MTV1 (Magyar TV1)
- (Magyar TV2)
- MTV3 (Magyar TV3)
- Motorsport.tv
- M6
- Tre TV
- M4K
- M24
- Super 2 TV
- Z+
- (Agro TV 47)
- Comedy Central Family
- Comedy Central
- MTV Live
- Rock TV
- P+
- 2. csatorna
- Msat
- Y7
- Viasat Film

== Channels and channel owners ==
=== Most viewed channels ===
Most viewed channels for 2025 are (total audience):

Rank	Channel	Logo	Group	All day share (%)	Primetime share (%)
1	TV2		TV2 Group	11.83	15.03
2	RTL		RTL Group	6.75	10.9
3	Duna		MRTV	3.25	4.23
4	ATV		ATV Group	2.95	3.67
5	Mozi+		TV2 Group	2.75	2.71
6	M1		MRTV	2.56	1.76
7	Prime		TV2 Group	2.47	1.7
8	Super TV2		TV2 Group	2.2	1.66
9	Cool		RTL Group	1.92	2.15
10	Izaura TV		TV2 Group	1.91	1.7
11	Sorozat+		RTL Group	1.84	2.03
12	Film+		RTL Group	1.81	1.84
13	M4 Sport		MRTV	1.8	2.3
14	Hir TV		Hir TV	1.63	1.4
15	RTL Gold		RTL Group	1.5	1.46
16	Story4		Network 4 Group	1.43	1.01
17	TV4		Network 4 Group	1.22	1.32
18	AMC		AMC Networks International	1.11	0.95
19	RTL Kettő		RTL Group	1.05	1.03

=== Most viewed broadcaster groups ===
Viewing share of the biggest broadcaster groups, (2022, total audience)
Channel owner	Audience share (%)		Related tv channels
TV2 Media Group Plc.	11.5	24.3	TV2
S.C. CEE Broadcasting Co. Srl. (TV2 Media Group interest)	12.8	24.3	SuperTV2, Spíler, Spíler2, TV2 Kids, TV2 Séf, TV2 Comedy, Moziverzum, Prime, Izaura TV, Jocky TV, Mozi+, Zenebutik
RTL Hungary Plc.	7.4	16.7	RTL
CLT-UFA SA (RTL Hungary interest)	9.3	16.7	RTL Gold, Cool, Film+, RTL Kettő, RTL Három, Muzsika TV, Sorozat+
Hungarian Radio and Television	10.9		Duna, Duna World, M1, M2, M4 Sport, M5
Network4 Media Group S.a.r.l.	4.1		TV4, Story4, Aréna4,Galaxy4,Max4, Film4, Match4
AMC Networks Central Europe s.r.o	3.8		AMC, Film Mánia, Film Café, JimJam, Minimax, Sport1, Sport2, Spektrum, Spektrum Home, TV Paprika
MTV NETWORKS s.r.o	3.5		MTV, Comedy Central, Nickelodeon
ATV Első Magyar Magántelevíziós Zrt.	3.4		ATV, ATV Extra
Others	33.2		

=== Historical rankings ===
Channel	Launched	2024	2023	2022	2021	2020	2019	2018	2017	2016	2015	2014	2013	2012	2011
TV2	10/1997	11.7	12.3	11.5	11.2	11.0	10.3	10.22	10.72	10.77	12.50	14.05	13.6	15.8	18.6
RTL	10/1997	6.8	6.8	7.5	8.7	9.2	9.6	10.03	11.03	12.18	13.42	13.90	15.9	17.9	20.3
Duna	12/1992	3.2	2.8	3.0	3.1	3.2	3.5	3.98	5.48	6.13	5.54	3.23	2.3	1.9	1.8
ATV	1/1990	2.9	2.8	3.2	3.1	3.2	3.4	2.9	2.8	2.7	2.6	n/a			
Mozi+	7/2016	2.9	2.8	2.7	2.8	2.7	2.7	2.8	2.6	1.3					
M1	5/1957	2.7	2.7	3.0	2.8	3.1	2.8	2.93	3.39	3.32	4.04	7.65	8.4	9.2	7.9
Cool	9/2004	2.0	1.8	2.1	2.4	2.8	2.3	2.98	3.33	3.84	4.43	4.10	4.2	4.4	3.6
Film+	9/2003	1.8	2.0	2.3	2.5	3.0	2.9	3.18	3.31	3.08	4.12	3.85	3.9	3.5	3.5
Viasat 3	10/2000	<1.0	<1.0	1.1	1.4	1.7	1.5	1.82	1.87	2.53	2.96	2.65	2.8	3.8	3.6

== See also ==
- List of Hungarian-language television channels
- Media of Hungary
