= Mónika Show =

- Genre: Talk show
- Presented by: Mónika Erdélyi
- Country of origin: Hungary
- Original language: Hungarian
- No. of episodes: 1918

Production
- Production location: Budapest
- Running time: ~45 minutes

Original release
- Network: RTL Klub
- Release: May 7, 2001 – July 16, 2010

Mónika Show was a Hungarian talk show aired on RTL Klub every weekday from 2001 to 2010. The host was Mónika Erdélyi.

== Background ==
The main point was to let ordinary people go to this show in order to share their stories with the viewers. Mónika's role was to lead the conversations by giving equal opportunities to her guests for answering her questions. Sometimes the guests did not know about the topic itself so they had to face it in front of the audience.

== Rating ==
Originally, the rating was 12. Later on, they changed it to 16. There were some episodes when they had to put 18 restriction (the red circle).

== Criticism ==
This talk show was subject of criticism and fines from Hungary's National Media and Infocommunications Authority (NMHH) due to airing obscene content and fight scenes in the episode aired on 2 March 2009 which resulted in a 12-hour broadcast suspension in August 2012 at a time when Hungarian TV viewers were mostly focused on watching the 2012 Summer Olympics held in London.

The show had a significant overrepresentation of guests of Roma origin. Sándor Fábry briefly mentioned in the documentary Dumafilm that the Mónika show contributed significantly to the deterioration of the social perception of Romani people and the increase of racism against them in Hungary. Many of them spoke in front of the cameras and their criminal records were also made public. In this context, the case of Zoltán Csipkés, who appeared on the show with his former partner, Ágnes Botos, caused a stir. According to Botos, Csipkés had at the time severely abused her, while during the programme she herself had repeatedly assaulted him. Later, Zoltán Csipkés was imprisoned for the brutal murder of his then 16-year-old girlfriend, a programme that was never broadcast by RTL Klub.

Róbert Puzsér also argued for the racism of Mónika show in his programme Sznobjektív, where he ranked Mónika show number 5 in the 10 most vile Hungarian TV programmes. According to Puzsér, the programme's broadcasts had significantly damaged Roma-Hungarian relations and, in his words, had given the minority an ‘indelible stigma’. He also pointed out that Roma intellectuals had attempted to protest against RTL Klub's racism through the Mónika show, but there was no response among Roma civilians.
