= Noémi Gaál =

- Born: 10 October 1970 (age 56); Sárospatak, Hungary
- Occupations: TV personality; presenter

Noémi Gaál (born 10 October 1970) is a Hungarian TV personality and presenter for TV2 and has been a contestant on the Hungarian reality show Ázsia Expressz 1.
