= Mozi (disambiguation) =

Mozi (ca. 470 – ca. 391 BC) was a Chinese philosopher during the early Warring States period.

Mozi may also refer to:

- Mozi (book), ancient Chinese text expounding the philosophy of Mohism
- Mozi (satellite), nickname of Quantum Experiments at Space Scale (QUESS), a joint Austrian-Chinese quantum satellite
- Mozi+, Hungarian channel
