= DOT (mileage system) =

Television mileage system

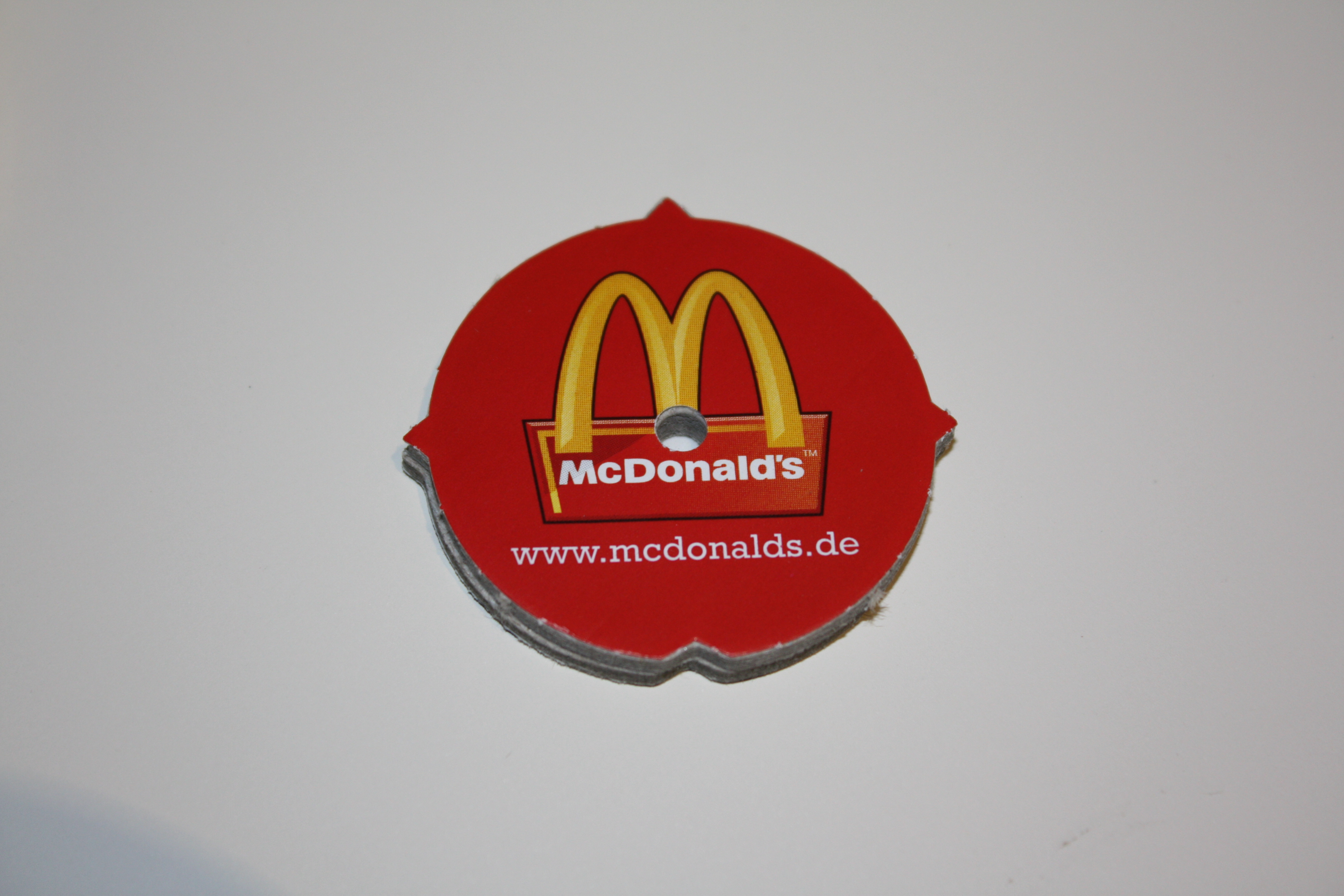
A McDonald's-branded DOT disc used in Germany

DOT, known in Hungary as TAP, in Germany as Dotwin and in New Zealand as TellyDOTS, was a German-developed television mileage system created by Thomas Hohenacker (who also created earthTV) and Andrej Henkler for the former's TV Miles International. The DOTs were adopted in several European countries, Australia, New Zealand and Malaysia.

== Creation and goal ==
Hohenhacker worked on the idea for the DOT as early as 1992, and by 1998, it was patented worldwide. The name DOT was "purely imaginary" according to a 1999 profile of the project from Der Spiegel. The device was used to accumulate mileage through television, in certain programs, which would later give the viewer prizes in return. Beginning in the summer of 1998, the DOT idea started its implementation.

== Function ==
The DOT was a circular cardboard disc, which was only activated in selected television programs broadcast by the channel involved. The disc included a sensitive film which stored data of the channel, specifically the time and date and the program aired. DOTs detected advertising information in specific color codes.

== By country ==
=== Hungary ===
In late 1998, the Hungarian private channel TV2 became the first in the world to implement the system, selling 3.6 million units for a five-week period. Known locally as TAP, the magazine partner was TVR-Hét, while the travel partner was Tensi Tours (with the travel prize being a trip to Israel). As of mid-December 1998, more than four million TAP discs were obtained at McDonald's, Shell and Kodak Express. The campaign ended during TV2's New Year special. The overall results of the TAP campaign were satisfactory for the advertisers and for TV2, with sales of McDonald's menus skyrocketing. Search for the TAPs was high, causing some of its restaurants to lack them even before the campaign was over. Some even became collector's items due to their designs.

=== Portugal ===
TV Miles held negotiations with SIC to launch the DOT system in Portugal in 1999; in January 2000, the DOTs were first advertised on the channel, being implemented at the end of the month, and ending on March 25. Portugal became the second country to introduce the system.

=== Australia ===
The Seven Network initiated the DOT campaign (as Adopt-A-Dot) after the 2000 Summer Olympics ended, as an attempt to boost post-Games ratings.

=== New Zealand ===
Simultaneously with its implementation in Australia, private channel TV3 introduced the TellyDOTS in October 2000. The campaign ran for four weeks, and five million DOT devices were imported from Germany for the purpose, with the grand prize being NZ$333,333. Upon its end, TV3's ratings increased in the 18-49 demographic.

=== Germany ===
Dotwin was introduced to ProSieben in the spring of 2001, with its commercial partners being McDonald's, Shell, Deutsche Bank, Bild and T-D1. Sister channel Sat.1 initiated a second campaign, aligned with the 2002 FIFA World Cup and using the brand of its live football program ran. The campaign lasted from May 31 to June 26, with the winners announced on the day of the final.

=== Poland ===
TVN initiated the Przygarnij Kropka (or Kropek) campaign in 2002. The discs were active from October 1 to November 10.

=== Malaysia ===
In August 2003, TV Miles partnered with NTV7 to introduce the DOT system, the first such country in Asia to do so. Negotiations were underway with advertisers from September, with results expected by late October. It was expected that NTV7 would start the campaign by February 2004.

=== Other countries ===
At the time of its creation, there were also plans to implement the system in the United Kingdom, France, Denmark and Mexico.

== Criticism ==
In March 2000, an article for the Portuguese newspaper Público with the help of scientists debunked the supposed "infallible" disc, especially its lack of detection when the channel changed to a non-participating station. In New Zealand, a New Zealand Herald columnist compared the campaign to "cargo cult worship".

Shortly after its implementation in Germany, a campaign to boycott the DOT began circulating on newsgroups, under the grounds that the device, using a CC128-A4 chip developed by Infineon, would also store personal data. ProSieben claimed that the text was comparable to "a fantasy novel".

== In popular culture ==
The Portuguese series O Programa da Maria had a family of DOTs.
