= Hálózat TV =

- Type: Commercial television network
- Country: Hungary
- Broadcast area: 65.2%

Programming
- Picture format: 480i SDTV 4:3

Ownership
- Owner: Hálózatos Televíziók Zrt

History
- Launched: 2002
- Closed: 2013

Links
- Website: www.halozattv.hu

Hálózat TV was a private television broadcasting company in Hungary. Hálózat TV was founded in Budapest in 2002 and ceased broadcasting in January 2013 due to financial liquidation.

Hálózat was founded by a company of 34 local television stations, its main aim was to fill fin the hole in the required four-hour programming of the networks funded by state funds and the budgets of city governments. The owner stations subscribed for three to five hours of daily Hálózat TV programming on weekdays and eight to ten hours a day at the weekend. Some (usually infotainment) parts of the programming were made not just for, but by, the workers of the local stations. According to a document by the National Media and Infocommunications Authority, the editing of the network's 20:30 newscast called Hírháló (Newsnet) was the least violent amongst the stations in the country.

Some of the series Hálózat put on screen, alongside feature films, aired every evening:

- Die Rettungsflieger (Hungarian title: Mentőhelikopter / English translation: Rescue Helicopter)
- Verliebt in Berlin (Lisa csak egy van / There's Only One Lisa, also aired that time on TV2)
- Pacific Blue
- Édes otthon (Sweet Home)

Thus, the later years being it common in Hungary, the channel has never aired in 16:9 aspect ratio.
