= Local TV channels in Hungary =

Many towns and localities in Hungary have their own local television station. The majority of these channels are only available on local CATV networks.

== List of Hungarian local television channels ==
- Ajka TV (Ajka)
- Alba Orion (Székesfehérvár)
- Alföld TV (Debrecen)
- Ácsi TV (Ács)
- Bajai TV (Baja)
- Balmazújváros TV (Balmazújváros)
- Baracs TV (Baracs)
- Bácska TV (Baja)
- Bátonyterenye Városi Televízió (Bátonyterenye)
- Bátor TV (Nyírbátor)
- Bogárdi Tévé (Sárbogárd)
- Bonyhádi Városi TV (Bonyhád)
- Budavidék Regionális Televízió (Budakeszi)
- BTV (Berettyóújfalu)
- Ceglédi Városi Televízió (Cegléd)
- Cell TV (Celldömölk)
- Centrum TV (dél-pesti régió)
- City TV (Budapest - District V. (Belváros-Lipótváros))
- Civil TV (Szentes)
- Csaba TV (Békéscsaba)
- Csepp TV (Budapest - District XXI. (Csepel))
- Csele TV (Mohács)
- Csongrád Televízió (Csongrád)
- Dabas Televízió (Dabas)
- Debrecen TV (Debrecen)
- Dél-pesti kerületi televíziók (Budapest)
- Diák TV (Kazincbarcika)
- KisDuNaTv (Dunaharaszti)
- DSTV (Dunaújváros)
- D+ TV (Dunaújváros)
- Duna Vidék Televízió (Szigetszentmiklós)
- Eger Városi Televízió (Eger)
- Eleven Televízió (Bükkábrány)
- Enying Városi Televízió (Enying)
- ESTV (Pesterzsébet) (Soroksár)
- Érdi Televízió (Érd)
- FMTV (Szigetvár)
- Fonyód TV (Fonyód)
- Fót TV (Fót)
- Főnix - A Fő Városi Televízió (Budapest)
- Főnix TV (Tiszafüred)
- Füred TV (Balatonfüred)
- Füzes TV (Füzesgyarmat)
- Füzesabonyi Városi Televízió (Füzesabony)
- Galga TV (Aszód)
- Gerje TV (Albertirsa)
- Gotthárd TV (Szentgotthárd)
- Gödöllő Plusz TV (Gödöllő)
- Gran Televízió (Esztergom)
- Gyömrői Városi Televízió (Gyömrő)
- Gyöngyösi Városi Televízió (Gyöngyös)
- Gyula Televízió (Gyula)
- Hajdúnánási Helyi Televízió (Hajdúnánás)
- Hajdúszoboszlói Városi Televízió (Hajdúszoboszló)
- Halas TV (Kiskunhalas)
- Halom TV (Százhalombatta)
- Hatvan TV (Hatvan)
- HBTV (Hajdúböszörmény)
- Híd Televízió (Komárom)
- Híd TV Barcs (Barcs)
- Hódmezővásárhelyi Televízió (Hódmezővásárhely)
- Inside TV (Göd)
- Ipoly TV (Balassagyarmat)
- Jánossomorja TV (Jánossomorja)
- Jász Trió TV (Jászberény)
- Kaba Városi TV (Kaba)
- Kalocsa TV (Kalocsa)
- Kanizsa TV (Nagykanizsa)
- Kapos Televízió (Kaposvár)
- Karcag Televízió (Karcag)
- Kecel Városi TV (Kecel)
- Kecskeméti Televízió (Kecskemét)
- Kerecsen TV (Debrecen)
- Kerületi TV (Budapest - District IX.(Ferencváros))
- Keszthely TV (Keszthely)
- KisKőrös TV (Kiskőrös)
- Kolor TV (Kazincbarcika)
- Kölcsey TV (Nyíregyháza)
- Kör TV (Ráckeve)
- Körmendi Városi Televízió (Körmend)
- Körös TV (Szarvas)
- Körzeti Televízió (Esztergom)
- Ladány TV (Püspökladány)
- M1 TV (Mátészalka)
- Makó Városi Televízió (Makó)
- Marcali Városi TV (Marcali)
- Másik TV (Dombóvár)
- Miskolc TV (Miskolc)
- Mosonmagyaróvári Városi Televízió (Mosonmagyaróvár)
- Mozaik TV (Ercsi)
- Móri Városi TV (Mór)
- Nagyatádi Városi Televízió (Nagyatád)
- Nagykállói Televízió (Nagykálló)
- Nyerges TV (Nyergesújflu)
- Nyéki TV (Nyékládháza)
- Nyíregyházi Televízió (Nyíregyháza)
- Objektív Telvízió (Gyergyószentmiklós)
- Orosházi Városi Televízió (Orosháza)
- Oroszlányi Televízió (Oroszlány)
- Ózdi Városi Televízió (Ózd)
- Öböl TV (Balatonfűzfő)
- Pásztói Városi TV (Pásztó)
- Pátria TV (Vecsés)
- Pécs TV (Pécs)
- Pilis TV (Solymár)
- Pilis Városi Képújság (Pilis)
- Polgárdi VTV (Polgárdi)
- Pomáz TV (Pomáz)
- Pont TV (Isaszeg)
- Promontor TV (Budapest - District XXII.(Budafok-Tétény))
- Pulzus TV (Sopron)
- Putnok Városi Televízió (Putnok)
- Rábaközi Televízió (Kapuvár)
- Revita Televízió (Győr)
- Régió Televízió Esztergom (Esztergom)
- Sajó TV (Sajószentpéter)
- Salgótarjáni Városi Televízió (Salgótarján)
- Sarkad TV (Sarkad)
- Sió Televízió (Siófok)
- Somogy Televízió (Kaposvár)
- SopronTV (Sopron)
- Strázsahegyi Közösségi Televízió (Esztergom)
- Supra TV (Balatonboglár)
- Szegedi Városi Televízió (Szeged)
- Szerencsi Televízió (Szerencs)
- Fehérvár TV (Székesfehérvár)
- Szilas TV (Kerepes)
- Szolnok TV (Szolnok)
- Szombathelyi Televízió (Szombathely)
- T1TV (Törökszentmiklós)
- Tapolca TV (Tapolca)
- Tatabánya TV (Tatabánya)
- Tatai TV (Tata)
- Telekeszi TV (Dunakeszi)
- TelePaks (Paks)
- Telin TV (Szeged)
- Tiszafüred Városi Televízió (Tiszafüred)
- TiszapART Kulturális Televízió (Szeged)
- Tisza TV (Tiszaújváros)
- Tiszavasvári Városi Televízió (Tiszavasvári)
- Tolnatáj Televízió (Szekszárd)
- Tó Tévé (Gárdony)
- Trió TV (Kiskunfélegyháza)
- Túri Televízió (Mezőtúr)
- TV Kisúj (Kisújszállás)
- TV Szentendre (Szentendre)
- TV10 (Budapest - District X.(Kőbánya))
- Vadna Községi Televízió (Vadna)
- VÁC-ES Televízió (Vác)
- Várpalota TV (Várpalota)
- Veresegyházi Városi TV (Veresegyház)
- Veszprém Televízió (Veszprém)
- VTV Nyíregyháza (Nyíregyháza)
- VTV Pápa (Pápa)
- Williams Televízió (Vecsés)
- Zalaegerszegi Televízió (Zalaegerszeg)
- Zamárdi VTV (Zamárdi)
- Zemplén TV (Sátoraljaújhely)
- Zenit TV (Budapest - District XVI.)
- Zugló TV (Budapest - District XIV.(Zugló))
- Zsolca TV (Felsőzsolca)

== See also ==
- Media of Hungary
