= M4 Sport =

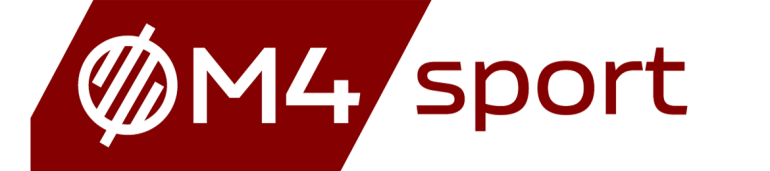
- Country: Hungary
- Broadcast area: Nationwide

Programming
- Picture format: 1080i (HDTV)

Ownership
- Owner: Hungarian Radio and Television
- Sister channels: Duna; Duna World; M1; M2; M3; M4 Sport+; M5

History
- Launched: 18 July 2015; 11 years ago

Links
- Website: www.mediaklikk.hu/m4/

M4 Sport is a Hungarian terrestrial television channel owned and operated by Hungarian Radio and Television since 2026. On this channel, events of the 16 prominent Hungarian sports are carried, as well as international sports events, events featuring outstanding Hungarian athletes, and the broadcast of their competitions and championships. All of this includes self-produced shows. M4 Sport provides approximately 10 hours of "live" sports broadcasting per day.

On 18 July 2020, on the channel's fifth birthday, it was announced that a new channel called 'M4 Sport+ would be launched from 12 September. For the time being, the new channel can only be viewed for a limited time, on weekends between 14:00 and 22:00 in the time slot shared with Duna World, not only in Europe, but also in those parts of the world where Duna World's programs are broadcast to Hungarians abroad. The terrestrial coverage of the channel is 99.6% of Hungary's territory. In 2022, the channel had an audience share of 2,7%.

The channel's advertising time is sold by Atmedia.

== History and technical data ==
Based on the amended Media Act, service providers were obliged to transmit the subscription-free M4 Sport as of 1 July 2015, in one of the first program slots, just like the other networks of the MTVA, with the exception of M3. On analog networks, the channel mostly replaced Duna World, on digital channels it got a new frequency along with its HD version, including on MinDig TV. Thus, the HD version of Duna World did not have to be transmitted, although it was not discontinued either, because it is still available on some service providers.

The channel is also available in HD quality on the Eutelsat 9A satellite (11,958 MHz), also replacing Duna World HD. However, a significant part of the broadcasts here are geoblocked for rights reasons (such as the Formula 1 broadcasts and their special races), so anyone who wants to watch the channel abroad must obtain a code card from the MTVA for this purpose.

M4 Sport is the first sports television in Hungary, whose programs are subtitled on Teletext, on page 444. MTVA uses an automatic speech recognition system for live broadcasts. Because of this, the subtitles of Duna World have been moved to page 555 since 1 July 2015.

The channel identification logo, on the other hand, is not located on the left, but on the upper right corner, like the rest of the public TV broadcasters, due to the uniform appearance of international broadcasts (e.g. Formula 1). M4 Sport was the first public television with an independent image since the 2012 image update. Later, the M1, M2 and M5 also got it.

The M4 Sport was the first to use a logo different from the first three channels (slanted and non-equal length lines). In the case of parallel broadcasts, the more important event is broadcast by M4 Sport, while the other is usually broadcast by Duna World or Duna. In August 2016, during the Rio Olympics, M4 Sport exclusively broadcast the events of the Olympics, other sports events and M4 Sport's magazine programs were broadcast by M5 during this time.

Five times a day, it broadcasts the daily current affairs program Egy Perc Híradó of the M1 channel.

On 9 June 2021, for the time of the Tokyo Olympics, five new supplementary channels for online pop-up broadcasts were launched, M4 Sport 1, M4 Sport 2, M4 Sport 3, M4 Sport 4 and M4 Sport 5. Their pop-up programs are exclusively available on m4sport.hu is available and contains broadcasts that did not have a place on the terrestrial channels. On 11 June 2021, the channel got a new look, and the studio was also renewed.

== Olympic broadcasts ==
The summer and winter Olympics were exclusively broadcast on public television in Hungary. This became the case even after the launch of the M4 Sport. The rights were bought from the European Broadcasting Union (EBU), the European public service television organization.

However, for the period between 2018 and 2024, Discovery Communications acquired the European television and multiplatform broadcasting rights for the Olympic events, so M4 had to negotiate with them to keep the Olympics available on free platforms alongside the paid pan-European Eurosport.

The International Olympic Association has awarded the EBU and Warner Bros. Discovery with all European broadcast rights for the four Olympic Games to be held between 2026 and 2032. The EBU will have the rights to free-to-air broadcasts on television and digital platforms. All EBU members – including M4 Sport indirectly – will provide more than 200 hours of coverage of the Summer Olympic Games and at least 100 hours of the Winter Olympic Games on television, radio, live streaming, and reports appearing on websites, apps and social media platforms. in the framework of Thus ensuring European public television that some of the broadcasts are still available on FTA channels. The paid broadcasts can also be followed on Eurosport this time.
