= RTL (Hungarian TV channel) =

Hungarian television station

- Logo used since 2022
- Country: Hungary
- Broadcast area: Hungary, Romania, Serbia, Slovakia, Austria, Czech Republic, Croatia, Slovenia, Ukraine
- Headquarters: 1222 Budapest, Nagytétényi út 29. (Media Center Campona)

Programming
- Language: Hungarian
- Picture format: 1080i (HD); 576i (SD)

Ownership
- Owner: RTL Group
- Parent: RTL Magyarország
- Key people: Gabriella Vidus, CEO; Dr. Péter Kolosi, Programming Director
- Sister channels: RTL Kettő; RTL Három; RTL Gold; RTL Otthon; Cool TV; Muzsika TV; Film+ Sorozat+ Sorozat Klub; Mozi Klub; Kölyökklub

History
- Launched: 7 October 1997; 29 years ago (as RTL Klub)
- Former names: 7. csatorna (1993–1997); RTL Klub (1997–2022)

Links
- Website: rtl.hu

RTL (formerly: RTL Klub and abbreviated as RTL HU) is a Hungarian free-to-air television channel owned by RTL Group.

== History ==
Since its start, RTL Klub has focused to gain viewers from the urban population. The channel airs programs mostly for a younger (18-49) audience.

RTL Klub rebranded again in early September 1999. The idents consists of two elements (fire and water), with the eye motif being introduced for the first time.

On 17 December 2001, RTL Klub adapted another new identity, designed by Dogfish and focuses on people which then zoom into their eyes.

RTL Klub and TV2 aired two similar major reality series simultaneously. While TV2 purchased the rights of Big Brother, RTL Klub produced its own series called Való Világ (Real World). Való Világ had three seasons between 2002 and 2004. Since its second season the show has been much more successful than the rival Big Brother.

RTL Klub is the most watched TV channel in Hungary since 2002, thanks to the daily Hungarian soap opera Barátok közt (Among Friends), which is the most watched TV programme in Hungary with more than 2 million viewers; the tabloid magazine Fókusz (Focus) and the game show Legyen Ön is milliomos (Who Wants to Be a Millionaire?). Millionaire is off the schedule from September 2007 after seven years and has replaced by A Széf (Take It Or Leave It).

Before these idents were introduced, three teasers featuring Naná (the mascot that appeared on most idents itself, usually walking and enclosed in a dark red circle) would air during commercial blocks from late March 2003 until the moment when these idents would be eventually introduced on April 19 that year. These idents sometimes featured short 2D and 3D animations involving Naná itself. This was the last identity package with the "coloured" on screen bug, the next package had it changed into transparent gray.

From the fall-winter season of 2005–2006, RTL Klub has started to broadcast popular American TV shows like Lost. The first episode of Lost had almost 2 million viewers, and a 50% share. This was a record. The next year Prison Break started with almost 1.6 million. Nowadays a TV show at prime time (21:00) can reach 1-1.5 million viewers. In season 2006–2007 Prison Break was the most watched American series in Hungary.

From the fall season of 2007, RTL Klub has launched two new formats with great success. Poker Face ran like a tournament for six weeks with an average 38-42% share. The other new show was Csillag születik, the Hungarian version of the RTL Got Talent format. Poker Face ended with the super final at 18 December and the time slot of it will be occupied by the new game show A Széf (Take It or Leave it).

RTL Klub was the only licensed broadcaster of Formula One in Hungary from 2002 until 2011. After 10 years RTL decided not to renew the license for Formula 1. The reason was that they wanted to concentrate mainly for the prime time programs because of the shrinking advertising market.

RTL Klub changed its graphics package once again, at 19:00 CET of 24 December 2005, just after the end of RTL Híradó that day. For the first time in its history, the logo but stopped being colourful as it became light gray.

RTL Klub has been the only licensed broadcaster of Domino Day in Hungary, for 6 years (2004–2009).

RTL Klub introduced a new graphics package on 1 June 2008 at 16:30 CET, just before a commercial break during a simulcast of a horse race. The package features the FF DIN Condensed typeface. (Its main competitor TV2 used the non-condensed version of FF DIN from 2008 to 2020). The idents were designed by the team of the Argentinian television channel Punga TV. They were consisted of concrete blocks flying across the screen, against a backdrop of Hungarian landmarks or the Hungarian countryside, until they eventually formed the letters RTL (with KLUB in a much smaller font below). On its first day, the 2005–2008 on-screen bug was retained, but it was changed to a lighter but the next day, with the new appearing and disappearing "animations".

From 2010, RTL Klub started with 2 winning formats. First of all the channel after 6 years absence successfully relaunched the Való Világ franchise. VV4 ran with a 40% SHR among 18-49 demographic. Secondly they purchased the rights of television talent show The X Factor. The show ran with a 50% SHR among 18-49 demographic which is really high on the Hungarian television market. The Factor crashed the competitor talent show on TV2 so "Megasztár" left the time slot of The X Factor after a few episodes. Because of the success of both format, RTL Klub renewed both show for the 5th and 2nd season respectively. They started in the fall season of 2011.

To celebrate its 20th anniversary, RTL Klub rebranded for the first time in nine years, on 2 October 2017 at 04:00 CET. This was a major overhaul for the channel as its old graphics package, which was dominated by grey and fluorescent colours, was replaced by a vibrant multicoloured graphics package. This was considered the last image under the name RTL Klub.

It confirmed on 2 September 2022 that all RTL channels will change their names, while RTL Klub will be renamed simply to RTL on 22 October 2022 on the occasion of the channel's 25th anniversary. The channel changed its name and identity on 22 October 2022 at 20:40 CEST during the TV show X-Faktor. Its logo and identity is based on its German counterpart.

== Programming ==
=== Current ===
Series name	Hungarian title	Current season/Last aired season
Arrow	A zöld íjász	2nd
Bones	Dr. Csont	9th
Breaking Bad	Totál szívás	3rd
Castle	Castle	5th
Cobra 11	Cobra 11	18th
Criminal Minds	Gyilkos elmék	8th
CSI	CSI: A helyszínelők	8th
CSI: Miami	CSI: Miami helyszínelők	10th
CSI: NY	CSI: New York-i helyszínelők	2nd
Dallas	Dallas	1st
Damages	A hatalom hálójában	3rd
Deutschland 83	Volt egyszer két Németország	1st
Esperanza mía	Isten áldjon, Esperanza!	1st
Fringe	A rejtély	3rd
Gossip Girl	Gossip Girl – A pletykafészek	2nd
Grey's Anatomy	Grace klinika	8th
Muhteşem Yüzyıl	Szulejmán	3rd
One Tree Hill	Tuti gimi	8th
Primeval	Őslények kalandorai	3rd
Revolution	Revolution	1st
Sons of Anarchy	Kemény motorosok	3rd
Supernatural	Odaát	6th
The Closer	A főnök	6th
The Following	Gyilkos hajsza	1st
The Glades	Glades – Tengerparti gyilkosságok	3rd
The Mentalist	A mentalista	6th
The Tudors	Tudorok	3rd
The Vampire Diaries	Vámpírnaplók	2nd
True Justice	Igazságosztók	1st

=== Original programming ===
- Barátok közt (Among Friends): the most watched domestically produced television soap of Hungary. The show started in the fall of 1998, one year after the foundation of RTL Klub. The show remarkably resembles BBC soap-drama, EastEnders. Initially, it didn't have the expected ratings, however, bound by the contract, RTL Klub had to keep the show running. Since 2000, the third season, the show has been rarely beaten in ratings in its own timeslot. Today, the average rating of the show is about 2 million viewers, and it's a solid foundation of viewers the channel occasionally builds on. Each episode of the series is 15 minutes long, and every weekday two episodes are aired. In between the two episodes, there is a news session as well as the highest value commercial block in Hungarian television. The show will end, after 23 seasons, on July 17, 2021, with an extended special episode.
- X-Faktor: the licensed version of the talent show The X Factor. The first season started in the fall season of 2010. Because of the great success the 2nd season started one year later. Season 3 started in fall 2012. Season 4 started 1 year later with 3 new judges and 2 new hosts.
- Való Világ (Real World): the show is similar to the reality show Big Brother although there are some major differences between the two formats. VV first started on RTL Klub in 2002. At the same time the rival TV channel (TV2) purchased the rights of the successful Big Brother format. The 1st seasons of the 2 shows had similar ratings but BB was slightly ahead. Since the 2nd season VV crashed the rival format so BB moved to the late night time slot and died quietly. The 2nd season of VV was followed with a 3rd one which had great ratings again. (There was no BB3.) After the 3rd season of VV ended RTL Klub had the format rested for 6 years. In 2010 they relaunched the format with some changes. VV4 was followed by VV5 in 2011. VV6 started in Winter 2014 on RTL II and the channel continues it with a 7th season in Autumn. RTL Klub sold the format of VV to Czech Republic and Slovakia where the show was called Vyvolení. The Czech VV had 3 seasons while the Slovak had 2. In both countries VyVolení (the chosen one) won the time slot against Big Brother.
- Csillag Születik (A Star Borns): the Hungarian licensed version of Britain's Got Talent. Four seasons have been aired in 2007, 2009, 2011 and 2012 respectively.
- Fókusz (Focus) is a daily report magazine. It is on the air since the foundation of RTL Klub. (1997)
- Showder Klub is a stand-up comedy show, spin-off of former show of Sándor Fábry called Esti Showder. His programme goes nowadays on Duna.
- Házon kívül (Outside the House): a political show, which deals with two or three current political events or social problems every week.
- A Széf: A licensed version of Take it or Leave it. It began airing during the 2007 fall season.
- XXI. Század (21st Century): a documentary series which usually deals with historical moments which happened in the 20th century. Recordings presented in the show usually originate from the communist era and therefore are black and white. RTL Klub purchases most of the presented material from Hungarian national television (MTV or m1).
- Egy perc és nyersz: (Minute to Win It): It is the licensed version of the American game show Minute to Win It.
- A gyanú árnyékában (Cases of Doubts): It is a scripted docu-reality series started to air at the spring season of 2012. The series follows a documentary style. Every episodes deals with a family in some kind of trouble. The stories are based on real events. The characters are played by amateur actors. The second season started in the fall of 2012.
- A kód (The Code) is the licensed version of the British game show The Exit List by Balázs Sebestyén. It had aired at the fall season of 2012 every weekday.
- Házasodna a gazda: is the scripted reality series based on the format Farmer Wants a Wife. The first season aired during the fall season of 2012.
- Éjjel-nappal Budapest (Budapest – Night & Day): is a scripted reality series, licensed from German RTL II show Berlin Tag & Nacht. Airs every weekday at 19.50 since February 2013.
- Kölyökklub (Kid's Club): is a children programme block. Previously, in addition to cartoons, there was also a pirate-themed quiz show, hosted by Rita Jónás. Later, a talk show took its place, which was already hosted by Nóra Ördög, and in which children were also guests, but since July 1, 2006, it has only broadcast cartoons. The program is broadcast on weekends and holidays from 7:00 a.m. The programme had a former weekday companion program, Jó reggelt, skacok! (Good Morning, Guys!).

=== Former ===
Series name	Hungarian title	Comment
Alias	Alias	
Big Shots	Nagyágyúk	
Burn Notice	Minden lében négy kanál	moved to RTL2 after 1st season
Chuck	Chuck	moved to Cool TV after the 1st season
Cold Case	Döglött akták	
Day Break	Időbe zárva	
Dirty Sexy Money	Édes, drága titkaink	
Doctor Who	Ki, vagy, doki?	Series 1 & 2 only
Dollhouse	Dollhouse – A felejtés ára	
Dragon Ball	Dragon Ball	
Dragon Ball Z	Dragon Ball Z	also on Viasat 6
E-Ring	Titkos Küldetés	
ER	Vészhelyzet	
Glee	Glee – Sztárok leszünk!	cancelled after first season
Human Target	Tökéletes célpont	
Invasion	Rejtélyek városa	
Jo	Jo, a profi	
Joan of Arcadia	Isteni sugallat	
Journeyman	Az utazó	
Kingdom Hospital	A félelem kórháza	
Kung Fu: The Legend Continues	Kung-fu	
Legend of the Seeker	A hős legendája	
Lie to Me	Hazudj ha tudsz	
Lost	Lost – Eltűntek	last season was not aired
Martial Law	A harc törvénye	
Missing	Eltűntnek nyilvánítva	
Point Pleasant	Titkok Városa	
Prison Break	A szökés	
Private Practice	Doktor Addison	only the first 2 seasons were aired
Rescue Me	Ments meg!	
Rome	Róma	
Sailor Moon	Varázslatos Álmok	Last season not aired
Tatort	Tetthely	cancelled after 1st season
Sue Thomas: F.B.Eye	Sue Thomas: F.B.Eye	
Terminator: The Sarah Connor Chronicles	Terminátor: Sarah Connor krónikái	moved to Cool TV after 1st season
The Secrets of Eden	Az Edèn Titkai	cancelled after 1st season
The Big Bang Theory	Agymenők	only the first 2 seasons were aired
The Finder	Csont nélkül	
The Nine	Kilenc túsz	
The Shield	Kemény zsaruk	
The Sopranos	Maffiózók	
The Unit	Az egység	
Third Watch	Harmadik műszak	
Transporter: The Series	A szállító	
Traveler	Traveler – Az utolsó vakáció	
Tru Calling	Tru Calling – Az őrangyal	
Will & Grace	Will és Grace	

=== Former original programming ===
- Heti Hetes ("The Weekly Seven"): a show where seven known Hungarian comedians (one host and 6 guests) talk about current news, politics and public life. The show was on air from the early years of RTL Klub and the 500th episode was the last to air there. The show moved in 2012's fall to the sister channel RTL II.
- Legyen Ön is Milliomos: The licensed version of Who Wants to Be a Millionaire?. The series lasted nine seasons, hosted by Hungary's esteemed quiz host, István Vágó, but it was not going to be renewed after the licensor changed to RTL's major game show format. In September 2009, the show switched to a new format; the host was changed to Sándor Fábry, a well-known comedian in Hungary, and the players are always a pair of celebrities. It aired once a month but this format was not successful so the show was cancelled again. In February 2012 the show was rebooted again and returned with a new host, Sándor Friderikusz. It was aired once per week. The show moved in 2012's fall to the sister channel RTL II before being cancelled again in 2013. Then in 2018, the license of Millionaire was moved to its counterpart channel, TV2.
- Gálvölgyi Show: a parody show hosted by János Gálvölgyi, featuring short sketches which are parodies of TV shows, Hungarian and international celebrities, and commercials. The show also has several regular sketches, such as a conversation between two working-out rich men, which led to the birth of a decade-old Hungarian catchphrase "Gyúrunk vazze'" ("We're working out, damn it").
- Kész Átverés (Total Scam): a show similar to the MTV's Punk'd where the host does pranks on Hungarian and currently visiting celebrities.
- Esti Showder: a very popular talk show being broadcast every second week (except summer) at Thursdays 21:00. It loosely follows the format of NBC's The Tonight Show. The show features an opening session with the host cracking somewhat actualized jokes and rapidfire humorous monologues, followed by a regular session of Design Center, in which the host ironically presents absurd or downright ridiculous products created and sent to the show by viewers. After the design center, the show features a studio music session which presents successful or potentially successful Hungarian bands, and finally the show presents a talk session where Fábry sits down and talks to different Hungarian celebrities. After 11 years the show hasn't returned at the fall season of 2011. Fábry moved the show to m1.
- Celeb vagyok...Ments ki innen!: the licensed version of British TV show I'm a Celebrity... Get Me out of Here! The 1st season premiered at the fall 2008. Before the first-season premiere the 2nd season was announced as well. The 2nd season had even better ratings than the first season. The show will return in Autumn 2014 on RTL II.
- Vacsoracsata (Dinner Fight): the licensed version of Come Dine with Me.
- Benkő Feleséget Keres (Benkő is looking for a wife): RTL Klub's 2009 fall season reality about a search for a wife for Hungary's scandalous artist, Benkő Dániel.
- Balázs Show: a daily tabloid talk show, which aired every weekday at 16:30. The show followed a slightly more lightened up format than its counterpart, Mónika show. It ended in 2007 after years of success, cited reason being that the host became popular and wanted more serious challenges.
- Mónika Show: a daily tabloid talk show usually featured and tried to resolve family issues. The former Hungarian local authority National Radio and Television Syndicate had often punished the channel belong to highly violent behaviour and bad language used by the guests the show. On 8 August 2012, RTL Klub got a 12-hours break penalty for the show.
- Szombat Esti Láz (Saturday Night Fever): The show is based on the BBC One programme Strictly Come Dancing. In it famous Hungarian people dance with professional dancers. This show is also very popular. The 2nd-season finale had more viewers than the FIFA Football World Cup Final in Hungary. (Italy vs. France), it should however be noted that Hungary were not in the competition hence weakening interest. It had 3 seasons. 2 in 2006 (spring and fall) and 1 in 2008 (fall). The show returned in 2013 spring on RTL II.
- Győzike: a documentary-soap about a Hungarian gypsy family. The head of the family called Győző Gáspár, husband and father of two girls, who is a pop/rap singer and he had a band but after the show started in 2005 the band broke up. It used to be a very popular show, bearing similarities to MTV's the Osbournes. It had 7 seasons but the return of the show is unlikely.
- Pókerarc: The Hungarian adaption of the RTL format PokerFace. It debuted at November 2007 and broadcast every day at 19.00. At the end of the first season, before Christmas one player won 50 Million Ft. (200.000 Euro). The host of the game is István Vágó (the host of the previous game show Who Wants to Be a Millionaire? and Balázs Sebestyén (the host of Balázs show and Kész Átverés). The second season started in fall 2008.
- A Kísértés (The Temptation): the licensed version of Temptation Island. The show had one season on RTL Klub in 2004 and had moderate ratings and so it wasn't renewed for a second season.
- A Rettegés Foka (Fear Factor): It is a licensed version of the American Fear Factor. It was cancelled after 2 seasons, reruns however are still aired on Cool TV.
- Survivor – A sziget (Survivor – The Island): the licensed version of the famous hit reality show Survivor, whose international format rights are held by RTL. RTL Klub aired two seasons. The major difference between the Hungarian Survivor and the original one was the winner was selected by a public vote (via SMS or phone calls).
- Szeszélyes (Capricious): a show similar to long-running Szeszélyes Évszakok (Capricious Seasons). After the cancellation of the original show, RTL Klub launched its own version with the host Imre Antal, which ran until Antal's death of cancer in 2008. The channel didn't renew the license for the show because it had considerably lower ratings than the original.
- Csíííz!: the licensed Hungarian version of America's Funniest Home Videos.
- Jó reggelt, skacok! (Good Morning, Guys): a children programme block. It started on 1 February 2012 and was broadcast every weekday from 5.30am to 7.15am. The broadcaster has previously canceled some shows to cut expenses. Advertisers previously missed a weekday morning children's channel from the national channel. That's how the program started, which is similar to the Kölyöklub program block, with the difference that it has a different look and it's on weekdays. From 18 June to 31 August 2012, the show only ran from 6.40am to 7.30am and only aired two cartoons. It was off air from 24 December 2012 to 1 January 2013. The block was taken off the air on 28 December 2018.

== Criticism and controversy ==
=== Programming and content ===
Being a commercial channel, RTL Klub broadcasts an important number of populist- and tabloid-skewed shows and, specially, a high proportion of light entertainment and reality television shows. As a result, many of its contents have been criticised by some media circles. In 2018, the Hungarian General Court and media regulators NMHH imposed a fine of up to HUF 143 million (€440,000) due to inappropriate content shown on the fourth season of popular show Való Világ, broadcast in 2010, returning after a six-year hiatus. Such unappropiate content included graphic imagery which did not adhere to the rating assigned to the show, as well as undisclosed product placement.

Many of its fiction series have also received criticism, both political and moral. Popular comedy-drama series A mi kis falunk (Our Little Village), has received high ratings during its four seasons; however, it has been heavily criticized by many viewers and critics due to its storylines, which reflect the life stereotypes of many rural and popular Hungarian villages. It has also received condemnation from right-wing and far-right nationalists for supposed misbehaviour; for example, MEP Krisztina Morvai openly complained about the show when, during the summer of 2011, when she was on vacation, the show recorded portions of a storyline on the Pilis Mountains, which far-right government members and sympathizants have come to call it a miracle place where "the heart of the Earth beats", as told by Kata Jurák, editor of pro-government newspaper Magyar Idők.

Its informational content has also received heavy criticism. Its newscasts have emphasized crime and human interest stories, sensationalistic reporting, a faster-paced format, heavy use of graphics and visuals, and on-the-scene coverage. Its newsmagazine Fokusz has also received criticism, due to its mix of stories rotated around controversial issues and entertainment news. However, after 2014, the station's informational content, including its main evening news, has been including more political and serious news, improving its reputation over media critics and gaining credibility with viewers.

=== Editorial stance ===
RTL Klub has been critical of the Fidesz-KDNP government since it was sworn in to power in 2010. It is one of a small number of TV stations critical of it, including competitors ATV and N1 TV. The station began to have a serious impasse with the government in 2014, when such coalition announced the proposal of an advertising tax of up to 50% of the advertising revenue of any commercial TV station in Hungary. Many political opponents denounced that such law was targeted directly to the RTL stations, and, specially, RTL Klub. The station reacted by including, in its main news, more political stories, often very critical of Viktor Orbán and the right-wing coalition. RTL Group even threatened to sue the government in front of the International Court of Justice.

This led to an increasing menacing rhetoric between both sides, until such dispute was resolved in early 2015, when the government toned down its rhetoric and cancelled the controversial tax proposal, mainly due to pressure from European Union, German and Luxembourgish politicians and government officials. This resulted on the dismissal of longtime group CEO Dirk Gerkens, which was eventually snapped by its biggest competitor (and pro-government station) TV2. In order to protect the station's independence from the Orbán government, RTL Group moved the licenses of its Hungarian pay-TV stations to the Luxembourgish media watchdog, like most of its sister European TV ventures. RTL Klub is still broadcast under a license from the NMHH media council.

Although the station is still critical of the Fidesz-KDNP coalition, it has since toned down its aggressive rhetoric, but, at the same time, it has beefed up its informational programming, by adding more analytic and debate shows, including the debate show Magyarul Balóval (In Hungarian with Baló), hosted by former MTV political analyst and academic lecturer György Baló, which debuted in February 2015, and aired for four years until suddenly ending in early 2019, in an amicable decision related to György's need to undergo medical treatment for pancreatic cancer, to which he would succumb in March. The show was also accused of being unfavourable towards Orbán and his government, but it has been praised for inviting a diversity of representatives from political parties across the National Assembly. Its daily news broadcast has also received more praise and higher ratings due to its fact-based, but critical reporting on the government actions, alongside balancing the content focus of the station's newscast, often tabloid- and infotainment-skewed, as well as an improved on-air design. The station also made some international headlines when an interview made by the Financial Times to Hungarian-American billionaire investor George Soros, which has been falsely accused of corruption and antisemitism by the coalition government, was translated and portions of it broadcast on an edition of the main evening news in November 2017.

==== Hungarian anti-LGBT law and effects on programming and ad-breaks ====
After the passing of the controversial Hungarian anti-LGBT law, RTL Klub staunchly opposed these legislative amendments. Through a publicly-broadcast statement during its evening news broadcast (the station's most popular broadcast), the broadcaster not only expressed its objection to the law, which "seriously violates freedom of expression", but also reinforced "its commitment to the protection of children and families" by addressing the law "would effectively exclude sexual minorities from the mass media, making it impossible to combat negative stereotypes in society." RTL Klub also listed a number of series and films to which the channel produces and/or has the rights to broadcast, including many episodes of the popular Barátok közt (Among Friends) soap opera (which was, at that time, broadcasting its final season) and the Harry Potter film franchise, which would be affected by the law. As a result of the legislation, such series and films must be broadcast after midnight and classified as 18+, which the broadcaster also opposes staunchly. In addition, from July 8, 2021, all commercial breaks on RTL Klub and its sister channels became subject to the Hungarian content classification system.

As a result, promotional material for the station's programming has been gradually complying with the controversial law. The broadcaster removed an advertisement of their Barátok közt final season campaign, which depicted a gay marriage broadcast during the 2018 season. Instead of replacing the image, RTL Klub placed a statement condemning the passing of the legislation and asking viewers to support their stance by tuning in to the grand finale of the long running soap opera. The station's news programming also began to feature critical reporting on the effects of the law, and the RTL Klub DOG was modified to include the rainbow flag into the station's logo.

== Sister TV channels ==
RTL Klub has many sister channels. One of the owners of RTL Klub was "IKO Kábeltévé Kft.", which owned Cool, Film+, Sportklub (which ceased on 30 April 2016), Sportklub+ (which is a non-airing channel since 15 October 2009), DoQ (which closed on 31 March 2019), F&H, Sorozat+, Poén! (which became Prizma on 20 December 2010 and RTL+ on 1 May 2014), Reflektor (which closed on 31 December 2012) and Film+ 2 (which was replaced by RTL Gold on 3 July 2017), all of which are in some way related to IKO's primary channel, RTL Klub. In July 2011, RTL Group acquired seven TV channels from IKO Kábeltévé (Cool, Film+, Film+ 2, Prizma TV, Sorozat+, Reflektor TV, Muzsika TV). Tematic Cable Entertainment bought Sportklub, DoQ and F&H in 2013 from the RTL Group. Prizma TV airs since 1 May 2014 as RTL+.

=== Cool ===
Originally Cool had the target audience of 15-29 urban youths who love music, externals, clothes, trendy lifestyle and extravagance. The channel was launched on 15 September 2003 and it is available in 2.5 million households. The channel is on a 24/7 broadcast schedule, targeting audience not only during the day, but during the night as well. Cool airs reruns of series RTL Klub originally purchased or produced as well as series targeting today's youth. These include: South Park, Married... with Children (Egy rém rendes család), 24, Footballer's Wives (Futbalista feleségek), The L Word (L), Queer as Folk (A fiúk a klubból), The Unit (Az egység), Dead Like Me (Haláli hullák), Weeds (Spangli), Skins (Skins), Desperate Housewives (Született feleségek)

In 2007, Cool launched a series of topical shows produced by the channel, such as Cool Live and Cool Night, featuring younger hosts lent to Cool by RTL Klub. The earlier is a youth lifestyle show, and the latter is an adult show including interviews with Hungarian porn stars and producers, as well as occasionally shown soft-core video clips. As of 29 September 2013, these talk shows are cancelled.

In 2009, Cool purchased the airing rights of the successful Hungarian version of Whose Line Is It Anyway?, Beugró.

On 30 August 2010, Cool rebranded, opening for a wider audience. Since then the channel airs mostly crime procedurals like the CSI franchise, Bones, Castle, Cobra 11, The Mentalist, etc. The move was successful because as of July 2012, Cool TV is the third watched commercial TV channel, and most watched cable channel in Hungary (target audience 18–49, prime time 19.00-23.00), beating main competitor Viasat 3.

On 1 December 2014, Cool rebranded to its current ident package, and from 1 January 2015 onwards, the channel is available in HD too.

=== Film+ ===
Film+ was launched on 15 September 2003, the same time as Cool. The channel airs movies which previously aired on RTL Klub 24/7. According to the 2012 Hungarian television ratings, Film+ is the third-most-watched cable channel in Hungary. Due to the early success of the channel, the parent company launched Film+ 2, which aired movies in the same fashion as Film+, but it closed on 3 July 2017 to make way for RTL Gold, a channel which airs old episodes of RTL Klub's old game shows and talkshows.

The channel is available in HD since New Year's Day 2015.

Film+ rename Mozi Klub 15 december 2023.

=== RTL Gold ===
Film+ 2 was a non-violent family channel. It launched on 2 April 2008. This movie channel was devoted partly to female audiences, and partly to family films during the evenings and weekends. It offered comedies, romantic films, adventures and dramas. In the RTL cable portfolio, Film+ 2 was the channel that broadcasts most Hungarian films.

It closed down on 3 July 2017 to make way for RTL Gold. This channel broadcasts 24/7 and airs mostly the formerly successful gameshows of the parent channel – such as Hungarian adaptations of Who Wants to Be a Millionaire? (Legyen Ön is milliomos!, aired only parts being hosted by Sándor Friderikusz), The Exit List (A Kód) and Minute to Win It (Egy perc és nyersz) –, talkshows like Mónika Show (with 12+ rating, despite multiple times penalised on RTL Klub due to the guests' extremely violent manner to each other), Balázs show and Anikó show (flagship programme specifically made for the channel, hosted by former Való Világ competitor Anikó Nádai) and, since September 2018, it also airs Latin American and Turkish series. It also airs four parts of Barátok közt (Among Friends) daily, dating back to the 1998 beginning of the legendary series counting 10 455 episodes.

On December 10, 2022, at 5:00 CET, the channel got a new look.

=== Sportklub ===
Sportklub was launched on 2 January 2006. RTL Klub purchased the broadcasting rights of the FIFA World Cup 2006 but it didn't have enough airing time for all of the matches, and therefore Sport Klub was launched by the parent company to fill in. Sportklub aired various sport activities, such as the French and Italian football league (as partner of Digi Sport), tennis, poker, NCAA, athletics, futsal and box. The channel reran the Formula-1 broadcast of the parent channel to 2011. It aired certain matches of the English and the Spanish league, however its main competitors, the sports channels run by the Hungarian public service television MTV, Sport1 and Sport2, have the first pick of the matches they would like to air. To ease up the load on Sportklub, the parent company also launched Sportklub+ in September 2007, which aired sports events deemed to attract less viewers than the parent channel, but it closed on 15 October 2009.

Sportklub closed down in Hungary on 30 April 2016.

Sportklub is also available in countries close to Hungary in which countries IKO also operates, including Romania, Poland, Serbia, Croatia and Slovenia.

=== RTL Kettő ===
In September 2011, RTL Klub started a project named RTL2 to launch a new RTL channel in Hungary. In April, 2012 it was announced, that RTL will launch RTL II in September or in October with I Love Gjoni (reality show); Who Wants To Be a Millionaire? (Hungarian version) and Heti Hetes (weekly comedy show on Sunday nights).

In July 2012, something started to promoted on RTL Klub with these sentences: Life is Nice (Hungarian: Az élet szép.), The Sky is Blue (Az ég kék.), The Grass is Green (A fű zöld.), but it wasn't mentioned that these ads are advertising something. In September 2012, it was revealed that these ads advertised RTL2, the new commercial television channel what will launch on October 1, 2012, and it will replace Reflektor TV. In September, it suddenly became an Internet meme but bloggers and net users were disappointed when they got know the promotion is about "just" a new TV channel.

At the launch the prime-time schedule of RTL II included series: Modern Family, White Collar, Terra Nova, Journeyman, The Forgotten, Chase, shows moved from RTL Klub: Who Wants to Be a Millionaire? and Heti Hetes and a new magazine Forró nyomon. It airs as RTL II from 1 October 2012 to 20 November 2022 when it was rebranded to RTL Kettő.

=== RTL Három ===
It launched as Poén! on 2 April 2008, then it was renamed as Prizma TV on 20 December 2010. Prizma's focus was on entertainment and its purpose was to provide something attractive for each generation. Most of its programming consisted of beloved familiars, but there were some new audience favourites, too. It airs as RTL+ from 1 May 2014 to 28 October 2022 when it was rebranded to RTL Három.

=== Sorozat+ ===
Sorozat+ is the channel for fans of series – for those who live in anticipation of the next episode. Sorozat+ offers something for each member of the family, from Latin-American telenovelas to top US series. It launched on 2 April 2008.

=== Muzsika TV ===
Muzsika TV is a music channel that offers a mix of traditional and modern pieces, featuring the greatest stars of folk and pop music as well as operettas and musicals. It launched on 6 November 2009.
