= Super TV2 =

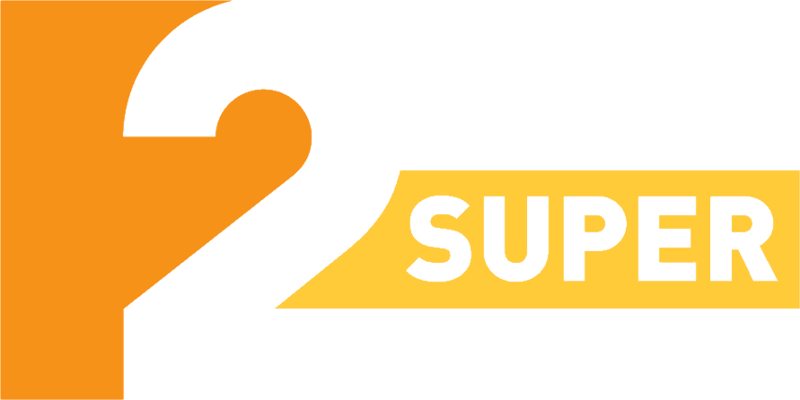
- Country: Hungary; Romania
- Headquarters: (Hungary) Budapest, (Romania) Bucharest

Programming
- Language: Hungarian
- Picture format: 16:9

Ownership
- Owner: TV2 Group (József Vida)
- Sister channels: TV2; FEM3; Mozi+ Spíler 1 TV; Spíler 2 TV; Izaura TV; Zenebutik; PRIME; TV2 Séf; TV2 Kids; TV2 Comedy; Jocky TV; Moziverzum

History
- Launched: 2 November 2012
- Former names: Gala TV (1995-2003); Super 2 TV (2003-2012)

Links
- Website: www.tv2play.hu/supertv2

Availability

Terrestrial
- Terrestrial Analog and Digital: Analog : Channel 007 (25UHF) local Analog Channel 25 (Prime); Digital : Channel 47

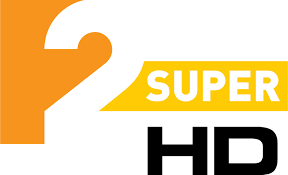
SuperTV2 HD's only logo since 2012

Super TV2 is a commercial television channel in Hungary, owned by the TV2 Group. It is rivaling with RTL II and Viasat 3. The channel launched on 2 November 2012.

Super TV2's target audience comprises young and urban viewers. The channel broadcasts self-produced programs.

== Programs ==
- 90210
- Combat Hospital
- Getaway
- Mr. Sunshine
- Ninas Mal
- NYC 22
- The Pacific
- Pan Am
- Ringer
- Sue Thomas: F.B.Eye
- Necessary Roughness
- Flashpoint
- Las Vegas
- How to Be a Gentleman
- Lipstick Jungle
- Breaking In
- The Client List
- A Nagy Duett (The Great Duet - television show)
- Jóban Rosszban (Hungarian soap opera)
- Super Mokka (daytime talk show)
- Super TV2 rajzfilmek (cartoons)
- Tények Hatkor (Facts at Six - news)
- Sztárban sztár +1 kicsi (Your Face Sounds Familiar (kids version))
