= Izaura TV =

Telenovela channel in Hungary

- Country: Hungary
- Broadcast area: Hungary
- Headquarters: Budapest

Programming
- Language(s): Hungarian
- Picture format: 16:9 (1080i, HDTV)

Ownership
- Owner: TV2 Group (József Vida)
- Sister channels: TV2; FEM3; Mozi+ Super TV2; Spíler 1 TV; Spíler 2 TV; Zenebutik; PRIME; TV2 Séf; TV2 Kids; TV2 Comedy; Jocky TV; Moziverzum

History
- Launched: 14 August 2016

Links
- Website: tv2play.hu/izauratv

Availability

Terrestrial
- MinDig TV: Channel 10

Izaura TV is a television channel operated by TV2 Group that broadcasts in Hungary. It is a telenovella channel, and it was launched on 14 August 2016 at 20:00 CET. The channel is named after the title character of Escrava Isaura, a series which was a breakout hit in Hungary.

== Shows ==
Original Title	Original Country	Year of production	Adapted title
Kara Para Aşk	Turkey	2015	Piszkos pénz, tiszta szerelem
Gecenin Kraliçesi	Turkey	2016	Az éjszaka királynője
Esmeralda	Mexico	1997	Esmeralda
Dong Yi (TV series)	Korea	2010	A királyi ház titkai
Muñeca brava	Argentina	1998–1999	Vad angyal
La venganza	Colombia-United States	2002–2003	Valentina titka
El cuerpo del deseo	United States	2005–2006	Második élet
Marina	United States-Mexico	2006–2007	Marina
Cuidado con el ángel	Mexico	2008–2009	Árva angyal
Mi pecado	Mexico	2009	Az én bűnöm
Eva Luna	Venezuela-United States	2010–2011	Eva Luna
Santa diabla	United States	2013–2014	A gonosz álarca
La gata	Mexico	2014	A macska
Kuzey Güney	Turkey	2011	Kuzey Güney – Tűz és víz
Yasak Elma	Turkey	2018	Tiltott gyümölcs
Paramparça (TV series)	Turkey	2015	Megtört szívek
Doğduğun Ev Kaderindir	Turkey	2019	A végzet fogságában
Bahari Beklerken	Turkey	2019	Reménysugár
Mrs. Fazilet and Her Daughters	Turkey	2017	Fazilet asszony és lányai
Afili Aşk	Turkey	2019	A szerelem csapdájában
La Doña (2016 TV series), La Doña (season 2)	United States, Mexico	2016	A végzet asszonya
Öyle Bir Geçer Zaman ki	Turkey	2010	Az idő sodrásában
