= FEM3 =

- Country: Hungary
- Broadcast area: Hungary
- Headquarters: Budapest

Programming
- Language: Hungarian
- Picture format: 1080i HDTV (downscaled to 16:9 576i for the SDTV feed)

Ownership
- Owner: TV2 Group (József Vida)
- Sister channels: TV2; Mozi+ Super TV2; Spíler 1 TV; Spíler 2 TV; Izaura TV; Zenebutik; PRIME; TV2 Séf; TV2 Kids; TV2 Comedy; Jocky TV; Moziverzum

History
- Launched: 1 January 2010 (original frequency); 5 September 2016 (new frequency); 8 March 2024 (as TV2 Klub); 8 March 2026 (new frequency)
- Replaced: FEM TV (2008-2009) TV3 (2009-2024) TV2 Klub (2024-2026)
- Replaced by: PRIME (original frequency); TV2 Klub
- Former names: FEM TV (2008–2009) TV3 (2009–2024) TV2 Klub (2024–2026)

Links
- Website: tv2play.hu/fem3

Availability

Terrestrial
- One: Channel 12

FEM3 (formerly TV2 Klub) is a television channel operated by the TV2 Group that broadcasts in Hungary. It is an entertainment channel, primarily dedicated to talk shows, reality series involving lifestyles, and family life.

It was originally launched on New Year's Day 2010. On 5 September 2016 at 05:00 CET, the old FEM3 was replaced by PRIME, and a new FEM3 started its test broadcasts on a new frequency. Both channels officially launched at 21:00 CET.

Prior to the launch, since 2008, the channel was planned with several names. First, they wanted to bring FEM to Hungary, the name then changed to TV3, as a reincarnation of an entertainment channel which closed down on 21 February 2000. The name was finalized in December 2009.

On 8 March 2024, the channel was rebranded as TV2 Klub, however the name will be reverted to FEM3 in 2026.

== Programming ==
=== Talk Shows ===
- FEM3 Café
- Micsoda Nők (Várkonyi Andreával)
- JOSHI, A legjobb barát (Joshi the best friend)

=== Imports ===
Original Title	Original Country	Year of production	Adapted title
Lie To Me	United States	2008–2010	Hazudj, ha tudsz!
Grey's Anatomy	United States	2005–present	A Grace Klinika
Elementary	United States	2012–present	Sherlock és Watson
Desperate Housewives	United States	2004–2012	Született feleségek
House M. D.	United States	2004–2012	Doktor House
The Good Wife	United States	2009–2016	A férjem védelmében
90210	United States	2008–2013	90210

== Logos ==
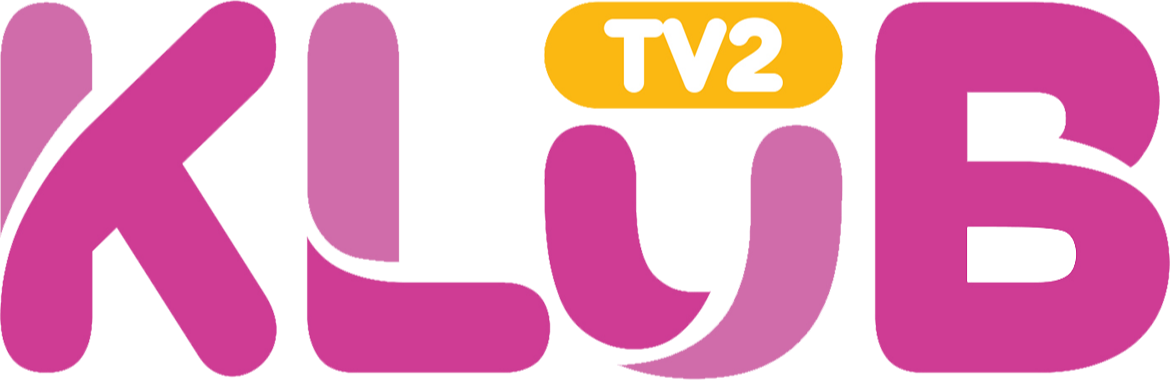
fem tv.jpg	tv3.jpg
2008 – 2009	2009 – 2011	January 2010 – 2016	5 September 2016 – 8 March 2024, 8 March 2026 – present	8 March 2024 – 8 March 2026
