= Atmedia Czech =

Atmedia Czech is a Czech advertising sales house specialising in thematic television channels. It serves as a link between TV advertisers and the thematic channels it represents, managing the sale of their advertising space. The company's long-term mission is to support and expand the market for thematic TV channels in the Czech Republic.

== Company History ==
The company entered the Czech market in 2008 as part of the Polish Atmedia Group, becoming the country's first independent advertising sales house for TV channels. A year later, 12 thematic TV channels represented by the company were already included in the official TV audience measurement, achieving a combined 2,65% audience share in the 18–69 target demographic. In 2010, the company pioneered a unique approach to selling advertising space by offering TV channel packages, becoming the first in the Czech market to implement this method. In 2012, the company launched the first edition of its guide to the Czech television market, titled Atmedia Navigator. The following year, it became a full member of the Association of Television Organizations. In 2015, Atmedia separated from the Polish Atmedia Group and established itself as an independent Czech company. Michaela Suráková joined the management team as managing director in 2015, a role she continues to hold to this day. In 2021, the company launched its own research initiative, Atmedia Index, offering comprehensive data on the usage of Pay-TV and paid VOD services on the Czech market. That same year, the company introduced Expert Talks, a videocast series featuring interviews with leading experts from the television and media market.

== Growth of the Thematic TV Channel Portfolio ==
In its first year of operation, Atmedia started representing TV channels such as AXN, CS Film, and Disney Channel. By 2010, it had expanded its portfolio to include the documentary channel National Geographic. Three years later, the company began collaborating with the media group Pohoda, which encompasses the Rebel music channel and the Relax lifestyle channel. It also extended its partnership with Československá filmová společnost, adding the documentary channel CS Mystery to its portfolio alongside CS Film, and later introducing CS History. In 2016, it expanded its portfolio by adding JOJ Family and JOJ Cinema, both part of the JOJ Group. The following year, it began a collaboration with CANAL+ Group, incorporating FilmBox into its collection of thematic TV channels. Over the next few years, FilmBox Stars and CANAL+ Action were added to the portfolio. In January 2020, the company began working with Warner Bros. Discovery, providing clients with access to the lifestyle channel TLC, the documentary channel Discovery Channel, and the sports channel Eurosport 1. The thematic TV channel portfolio was later expanded to include the film and series channel Warner TV. April 2025 marks another milestone as Atmedia broadens its portfolio with the introduction of the AXN Black and AXN White series channels. As of September 1, Atmedia will begin representing the Czech sports channel SPORTY TV, which is dedicated to covering local sporting events.

== Present ==
Atmedia Czech's portfolio currently includes 20 local and international thematic TV channels from major media groups, such as Antenna Entertainment, CANAL+ Group, The Walt Disney Company, Warner Bros. Discovery, Pohoda, and JOJ Group. The portfolio includes both Free-to-Air and Pay-TV channels. Atmedia sells advertising space targeting the 18–69 and 4–14 demographics through four commercial packages: atmax, atadults, atchoice, and atkids.

== Channels ==
List of channels represented by Atmedia:

- AXN
- AXN Black
- AXN White
- Canal+ Action
- CS Film
- CS History
- CS Mystery
- Discovery Channel
- Disney Channel
- Eurosport
- FilmBox
- FilmBox Stars
- JOJ Cinema
- JOJ Family
- National Geographic
- Rebel
- Relax
- SPORTY TV
- TLC
- Warner TV
