= RTL Kettő =

- Logo used since 2022
- Country: Hungary
- Broadcast area: Hungary and neighboring countries
- Headquarters: Budapest

Programming
- Language: Hungarian
- Picture format: 16:9 576i (SDTV) 16:9 1080i (HDTV)

Ownership
- Owner: RTL Group
- Parent: RTL Magyarország
- Sister channels: RTL; RTL Három; RTL Gold; RTL Otthon; Cool TV; Muzsika TV; Film+ Sorozat+ Sorozatklub; Moziklub; Kölyökklub

History
- Launched: 1 October 2012; 14 years ago
- Former names: Televízió 2 (2000-2003); Y7 (2003-2004); T2 (2004-2012); RTL II (2012–2022)

Links
- Website: rtl.hu

RTL Kettő (meaning RTL Two, formerly RTL II) is a Hungarian commercial television channel, owned by RTL Group. It is rivaling with Super TV2 and Viasat3. The channel launched on 1 October 2012.

== Beginnings ==
In September 2011, RTL Klub started a project named RTL II to launch a new RTL channel in Hungary. In April 2012, it was announced, that RTL will launch RTL II in September or in October with I Love Gjoni (reality show); Who Wants to Be a Millionaire? (Hungarian version) and Heti Hetes (a weekly comedy show on Sunday nights).

In July 2012, something started to promote on RTL Klub with these sentences: Life Is Nice, The Sky Is Blue, The Grass Is Green; but it was not mentioned that these ads are advertising something. In September 2012, it was revealed, that these ads advertised RTL II, the new commercial television channel that will launch on 1 October 2012 and it will replace Reflektor TV.

At the launch the prime-time schedule of RTL II included series: Modern Family, White Collar, Terra Nova, Journeyman, The Forgotten, Chase, shows moved from RTL Klub: Who Wants to Be a Millionaire and Heti Hetes and a new magazine Forró nyomon.

On 2 September 2022, RTL Hungary announced the channel's rebrand. On 20 November 2022, the channel is renamed RTL Kettő, adapting the visual identity of the parent channel RTL.

On 26 October 2023, Balázs Szabó, the Program Director and Head of Content Acquisition from RTL Hungary announced that the channel will continue to operate as a sitcom channel, alongside a 4 new channel launch. Since 18 December 2023, the channel continues to operate as a sitcom channel.

On 18 October 2024, the channel got a new, current idents.

== Programming aired by RTL Kettő ==
=== Series ===
==== Airing currently ====
- Barátok közt
- Burn Notice
- Chase
- CSI: Miami
- Dallas
- Homeland
- I delitti del cuoco
- Legend of the Seeker
- Pretty Little Liars
- Remington Steele
- The Big Bang Theory
- The Forgotten
- The Mentalist
- Without a Trace

==== Hiatus ====
- Modern Family (season 1 and 2 aired)
- White Collar (season 1, 2, 3, 4, 5, 6 aired)
- Friends (reruns of season 1 and 2 aired)
- Dollhouse (season 1 aired)

==== Ended ====
- Psych (ended)
- Journeyman (ended)
- Privileged (ended)
- Dollhouse (ended)

=== Local programs ===
==== Airing currently ====
- Szombat esti láz (Hungarian version of Dancing with the Stars)
- Showder Klub - stand-up comedy series
- NőComment! (pun with the Hungarian word for woman and the phrase "No Comment") - late night show with female-only guests, hosted by Claudia Liptai
- Vacsoracsata
- Segítség, bajban vagyok! (Help, I'm in Trouble!) - scripted reality-series
- Gazdálkodj okosan! reality series
- Az első millióm története (My first Million) reality magazine
- Péntektől péntekig (Friday to Friday) - weekly tabloid magazine
- ValóVilág (Real World) - RTL's successful reality show airing the 11th season in early 2023

==== Ended ====
- I Love Gjoni reality series
- Egy este... (One Night With...) - concert show
- Forró nyomon investigation magazine with Kriszta Máté, origins from TV2
- Legyen Ön is milliomos! with Sándor Friderikusz
- Heti Hetes - (Weekly Seven) - weekly newscast show based on the format of RTL DE's 7 Tage - 7 Köpfe
- Official UEFA Europa League broadcaster (2015-2018), now on RTL Három

== See also ==
- RTL Group
- RTL
- Cool TV
