= CS Film =

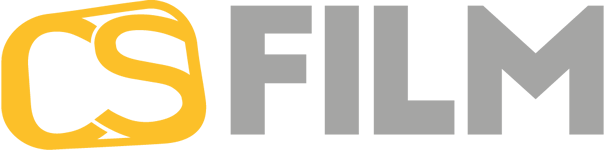
- Country: Czech Republic
- Broadcast area: Czech Republic, Slovakia
- Headquarters: Prague, Czech Republic

Programming
- Picture format: 576i (16:9/4:3) (SDTV); 1080i (HDTV)

Ownership
- Owner: JOJ Group (J&T Enterprises)
- Sister channels: CS Horror; CS History; CS Mystery

History
- Launched: 13 April 2004

Links
- Website: csfilm.joj.cz

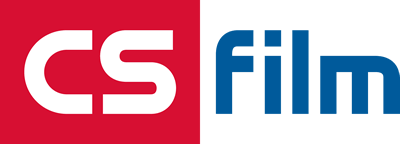
CS Film second Logo from 2017 to 2019

CS Film is a Czech television channel. It was founded and started to broadcast in 2004 by Czechoslovak Film Company ("Československá filmová společnost s.r.o.") and 2019 merger for Slovakia media by JOJ Group. CS Film specializes on cinematography of former Czechoslovakia (1918-1992).

== Filmy ==
- Dita Saxová
- Lelíček ve službách Sherlocka Holmese
- Lásky jedné plavovlásky
- Boxer a smrt'
- Trhák
- Mladé vino
