= M2 (TV channel) =

Hungarian television station

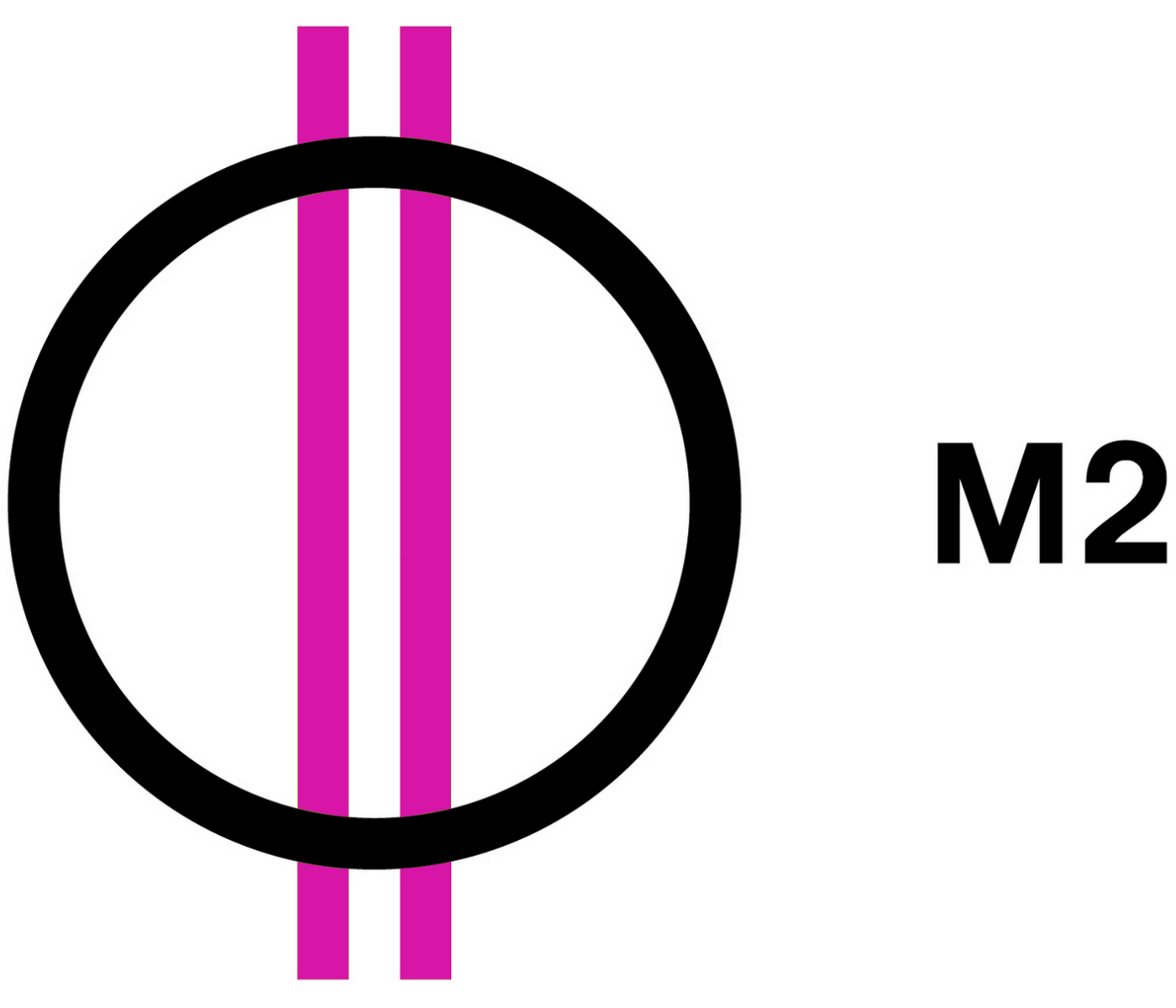
- Country: Hungary
- Broadcast area: Hungary, reaching bordering regions via overspill of the Hungarian terrestrial network

Programming
- Picture format: 576i (SDTV 16:9); 1080i (HDTV)

Ownership
- Owner: Hungarian Radio and Television
- Sister channels: Duna; Duna World; M1; M3; M4 Sport; M4 Sport +; M5

History
- Launched: 7 November 1973; 53 years ago
- Former names: MTV2 (1971–1989, 1994–2000); TV2 (1989–1994)

Links
- Website: www.mediaklikk.hu/m2

Availability

Terrestrial
- MinDigTV: LCN 2

M2 (em kettő) is a Hungarian television channel owned and operated by Hungarian Radio and Television since 2026. It is also transmitted in high definition.

On 22 December 2012, M2's daytime hours became dedicated to children's programming. Since 15 March 2015, the night-time programming is called M2 Petőfi.

Similar to TVP ABC in Poland, CBeebies, CBBC, and BBC Three in the UK, or ČT :D in the Czech Republic, M2 broadcasts children's programming during the day, while M2 Petőfi targets youth audiences as it broadcasts at night featuring music videos (local and abroad), music-related (music concerts), youth-related programming, and exclusive content from its radio counterpart, Petőfi Rádió.

== History ==
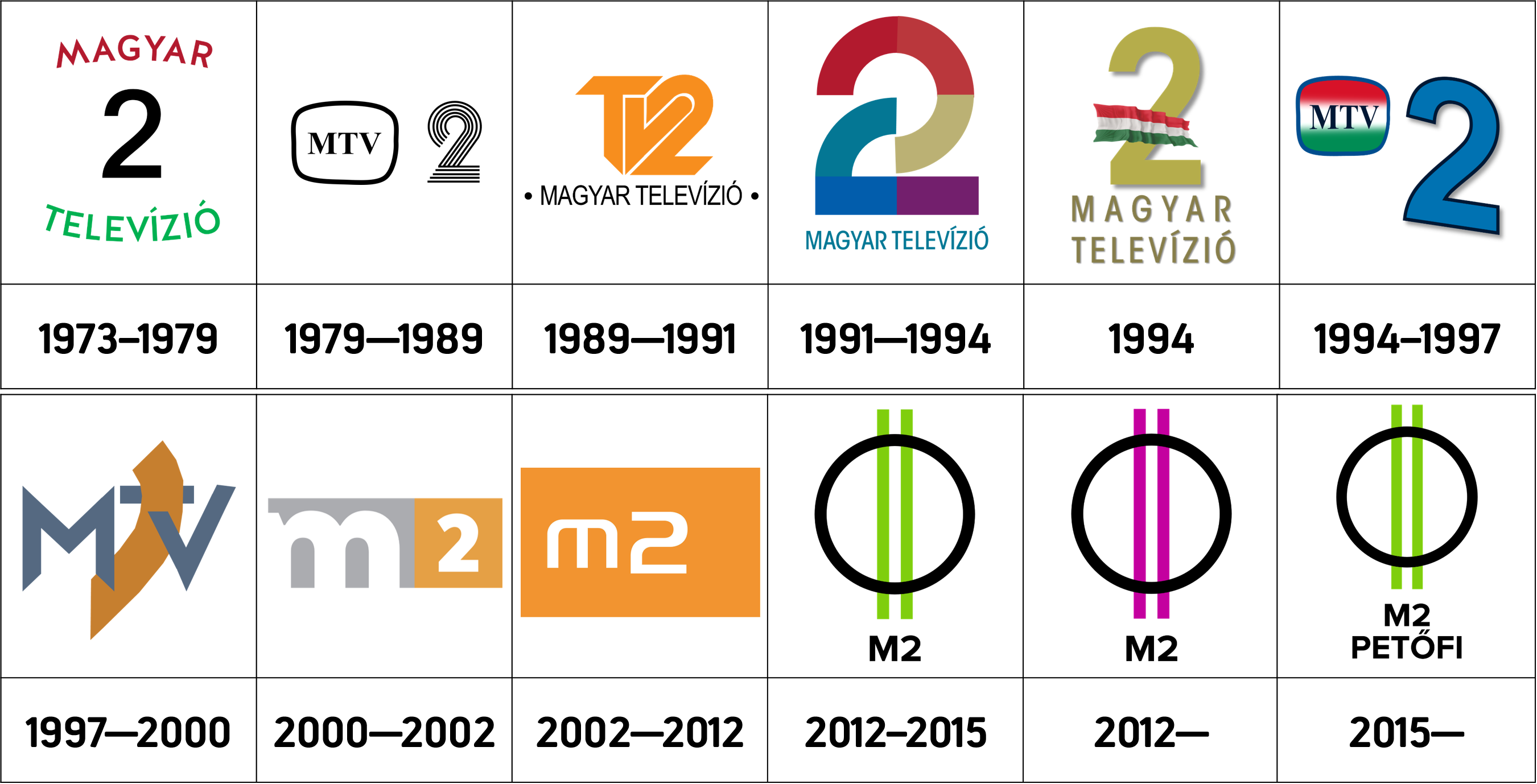
The logos used by M2 for the channel throughout its history

The second channel started broadcasting in 1973. Initially, it broadcast for four days a week, later, six days a week, taking a break on Mondays. Throughout the 1980s, broadcasting on Mondays became more regular.

From 6 May 1991 to 1993, Esti Egyenleg (Evening Overview) aired on this channel, in two daily editions (18:00 and 22:00). The bulletin was discontinued on the evening of 26 October 1993. Although a second edition had been scheduled to air after the 18:00 broadcast, it was ultimately replaced by Híradó from MTV1.

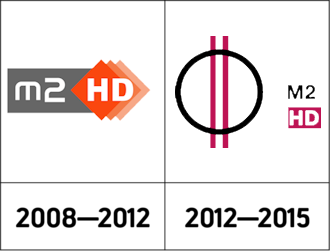
M2's HD logos

M2 launched its children block on 22 December 2012 at 05:00 CET.

On 3 November 2021, M2 Petőfi, the prime-time adult block, was rebranded for the first time since 2015. The rebranding also reflects M2, the main children's channel that the new look debuted on 1 October 2020.

== See also ==
- Eastern Bloc information dissemination
