= Sándor Fábry =

- Born: 20 November 1953 (age 72); Budapest, Hungary
- Occupations: Personality, talk show host, writer

Sándor Fábry (born 20 November 1953) is a Hungarian comedian, talk show host, and writer.

Born in Budapest, to Sándor Fábry Sr. and Éva Kovácsy. He has a brother. He attended the Teachers' Training College of Pécs and later the ELTE university. He worked as script editor at Mafilm until 1992, and he wrote for the satirical magazine Hócipő between 1989 and 2002.

== The Esti Showder ==
He was chosen by Kristóf Kovács, who previously worked for The Tonight Show in the US and returned to Hungary in 1997. The pilot aired on MTV in 1998. In May 1999 the show moved to RTL Klub, and the shows became longer (90 min.).

As of 2010, the shows air on Thursday every second week from 21:20 PM on RTL Klub. To the show, most often Hungarian celebrities were invited and sometimes representatives of government agencies, religions and civil rights movements to make the show more variegated. There was a permanent part of the show which was called the 'Dizájn Center'. In this section, which was the most popular because it evoked some nostalgic feelings among the viewers, different kind of products made in the second half of the 20th century were presented by the owners of the products. The DVD release, which included the 'Dizájn Center' elements, showed how successful the program was.

Since 2012 his tonight show returned to M1 (the new name of the National Hungarian Channel, MTV). The show turned to a more serious tone. The first part is about Sándor Fábry's stand up comedy and in the second part Hungarian celebrities (including musicians, writers, opera singers, sportsmen and sportswomen) are invited to participate in the show to make the program more cultural.

== Political views ==
He is a conservative showman who actively supports the Fidesz party.

== Sources ==
- Interview with Sándor Fábry
