= Cool TV =

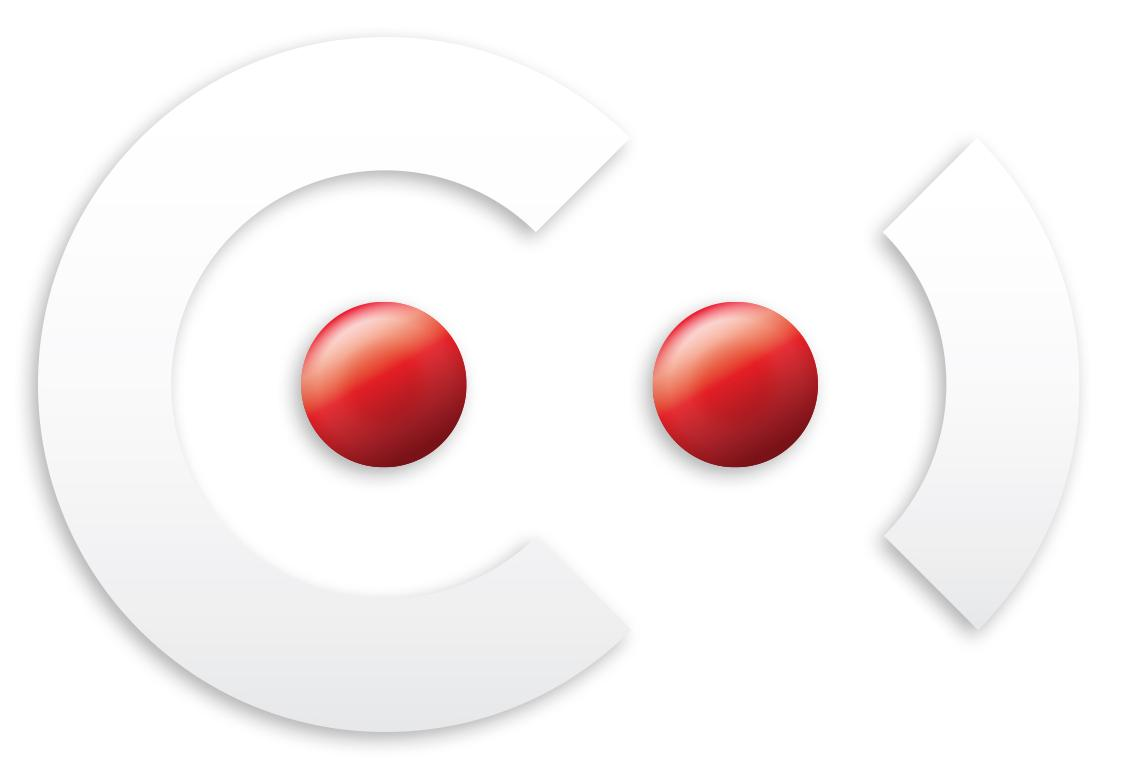
- Logo used since 2014.
- Country: Hungary
- Broadcast area: Hungary and its neighboring countries
- Headquarters: Budapest

Programming
- Language: Hungarian
- Picture format: 16:9 576i (SDTV); 16:9 1080i (HDTV)

Ownership
- Owner: RTL Group
- Parent: RTL Magyarország
- Sister channels: RTL; RTL Kettő; RTL Három; RTL Gold; RTL Otthon; Muzsika TV; Film+ Sorozat+ Sorozatklub; Moziklub; Kölyökklub

History
- Launched: 15 September 2003; 23 years ago (as m+); 4 September 2004; 22 years ago (as Cool TV)
- Former names: m+ (2003–2004)

Links
- Website: rtlmost.hu/cool

Cool TV is a Hungarian television channel owned by RTL Group. It was launched as m+ on 15 September 2003, but a year later, it was relaunched as Cool TV on 4 September 2004.

== History ==
=== 2003–2010 ===
Originally Cool TV had the target audience of urban 15–29-year-olds who love music, externals, clothes, trendy lifestyle and extravagance. The channel was first launched as m+ on 15 September 2003, but a year later, it was relaunched as Cool TV on 4 September 2004, so the channel could be available in 2.5 million households.

The channel broadcast 24 hours a day and aired reruns of series that RTL Klub originally purchased or produced as well as series targeting today's youth. In 2005, the channel has relocated on paper to Romania.

In 2007, Cool TV launched a series of topical shows produced by the channel, such as Cool Live and Cool Night, featuring younger hosts lent to Cool by RTL Klub; the former being a youth lifestyle show, and the latter being an adult show including interviews with Hungarian porn stars and producers, as well as occasionally showing soft-core porn video clips. These talkshows have now been cancelled.

In 2009, Cool TV purchased the airing rights of the successful Hungarian version of Whose Line Is It Anyway?, Beugró.

The channel broadcast 24 hours a day and aired reruns of series that RTL Klub originally purchased or produced, as well as series targeting today's youth. These included: South Park, Married... with Children (Egy rém rendes család), 24, Footballer's Wives (Futbalista feleségek), The L Word (L), Queer as Folk (A fiúk a klubból), The Unit (Az egység), Dead Like Me (Haláli hullák), Weeds (Spangli), Skins (Skins), Desperate Housewives (Született feleségek)

=== 2010–present ===
From 30 August 2010, Cool TV changed image and was rebranded, aiming for a wider audience. Since then, the channel airs mostly crime procedurals. The move was successful because as of July 2012 Cool TV is the third most watched commercial TV channel, and most watched cable channel in Hungary (target audience 18–49, prime time 19.00-23.00) beating main competitor Viasat 3.

On 1 December 2014 at 09:00, Cool TV got its current image and it was rebranded again. The new logo is similar to the one introduced in 2010, however, the two red dots remained the same, but the previously gray circles turned white and 3D.

== Logos ==
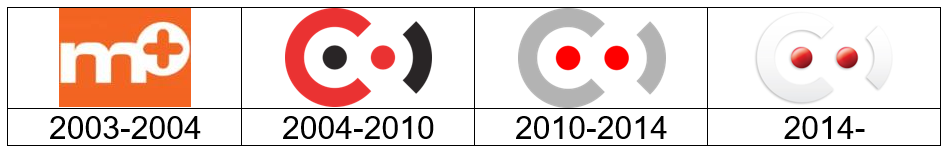
