= M5 (TV channel) =

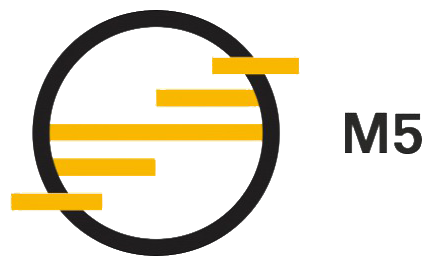
- Country: Hungary
- Broadcast area: Nationwide

Programming
- Picture format: 1080i (HDTV)

Ownership
- Owner: Hungarian Radio and Television
- Sister channels: Duna; Duna World; M1; M2; M3; M4 Sport; M4 Sport+

History
- Launched: 6 August 2016; 10 years ago

Links
- Website: www.mediaklikk.hu/m5/

M5 is a Hungarian cultural television channel owned by Hungarian Radio and Television. It was a sports channel in its incarnation, as an overflow service for M4 Sport.

== History ==
In February 2015, MTVA announced the creation of two new channels (M5 and M6). M5 was to be a channel for Budapest while M6 had an undefined theme, although it was suggested that it would become a cultural channel, taking over from DunaArt. M5 would use a DTT frequency that would also include M4K, a UHD channel.

Népszabadság reported on 13 November that an educational channel would be created instead of a regional channel. On 5 April 2016, website 24.hu announced that MTVA opted to broadcast the 2016 Summer Olympics and 2016 Summer Paralympics on M5 instead of M4 Sport. MTVA denied the news. On 22 April, it was announced that MTVA would start an educational and cultural channel on the DTT frequency. Five potential designs for the channel's logo were revealed.

On 6 August 2016, broadcasts of M5 began as a complementary sports channel for the Olympics and Paralympics. The educational format did not start until 18 September.

On 23 March 2020, due to the pandemic, the channel temporarily suspended commercial advertising. The channel started airing classes for secondary school students on 30 March.

On 3 January 2022, M5 introduced a new schedule and a new look.
