= EarthTV =

- Country: Germany
- Headquarters: Berlin, Germany

Programming
- Language: German
- Picture format: 576i (16:9 SDTV); 1080i (HDTV)

History
- Launched: 1998; 28 years ago
- Former names: EarthTV

Links
- Website: www.earthtv.com

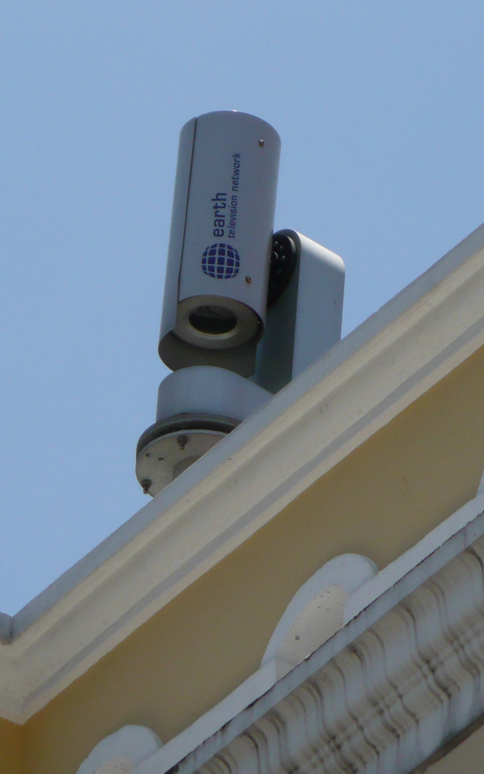
EarthTV's camera in Macau.

EarthTV Network GmbH is a German satellite Television Network, which airs live broadcasts from its camera network around the world. Cameras are located in well-known cities as well as lesser-known locations. EarthTV cameras usually feature beaches, mountains, seaside resorts, or skylines of major cities. They have over 70 cameras and air the World Live program, featuring 7 locations in 90 seconds, which is shown in 200 countries, reaching more than 2 billion viewers daily.

The cameras for live streaming are fully remote-controlled from the broadcast centre in Munich. The programme, featuring cities and landscapes, is transmitted from the headquarters in Munich. From there, they are sent to worldwide partners under the name World Live and similar formats such as Prayer Times and The Weather Today, claiming to reach 2 billion viewers in 200 countries, available in 10 languages and broadcast across 40 TV stations.

Earth Television Network GmbH (EarthTV), a company under Telecast Media Group (founded in 1985), produces, processes, manages and distributes broadcast quality video content from destinations around the world for use on the internet, mobile phones, info-screens and television.

At the beginning of the 21st century, EarthTV set up a network of fully remote-controlled TV cameras with motion control heads and zoom lenses, delivering live video feeds in broadcast quality, day and night (EarthTV cameras work well in low-light conditions). The unique technology and hardware of EarthTV equipment are the exclusive property of EarthTV protected by several international patents.

== History ==
In 2009, the BBC selected EarthTV.com as one of the best websites. In the same year, EarthTV launched its video player, which features a growing number of mainly weather and news-related websites.

== Programmes ==
- The World Live
- Motion Timelapse
- Seasonal Motion Timelapse
- Earthquiz
- World Weather
- Best of the Month
- Best of World Live
- El Mundo en Directo (Spanish)
- The World Programmes
- What a World!
- What a Day!
- What a Month!
- World Cup Countdown
- World Cultural Events

The programmes are aired on a multitude of news, travel and geographic channels throughout the globe, including Bloomberg TV, N24, Wetter.com TV, CNA (TV network) ABS-CBN News Channel France 2, Jurnal TV, Power TV, ON E, Al Arabiya, Al Iraqiya, Al Sharqiya, Saudi Broadcasting Corporation, Oman TV, Kurdsat, TVB Jade and SBS.

== Music ==
The music from EarthTV is on the CD Earthgrooves. Volumes 1 and 2 are available via iTunes.
