= D+ =

D+ may refer to:

- D+ (band), indie rock band based in Anacortes, Washington
- Disney+, a subscription streaming service owned by the Walt Disney Company
- Discovery+, a subscription streaming service owned by Warner Bros. Discovery
- Digital+, former name of Canal+ (Spanish satellite broadcasting company)
- D+, in grading in education
- D+, used to indicate cumulative altitude gain in trail and mountain running sports
- D augmented triad, a chord made up of the notes D, F#, and A#
- A positively charged D meson particle
