= Meteo TV =

Hungarian TV channel

- Country: Hungary
- Broadcast area: Hungary
- Headquarters: Budapest, Hungary

Programming
- Language(s): Hungarian
- Picture format: 576i (16:9 SDTV)

History
- Launched: 1 October 2012; 12 years ago
- Closed: April 2015; 10 years ago

Links
- Website: www.meteotv.hu

Meteo TV was a thematic commercial television in Hungary launched on October 1, 2012. It featured live weather reports, forecasts, hazard warnings, medical meteorological, traffic meteorological and traffic information every hour. The channel was discontinued at the beginning of April 2015.

== Distribution ==
The channel was available via UPC Digital and Invitel, but didn't gain much popularity. The channel was shut down in early April 2015, after which UPC Magyarország announced that the termination of the channel was the reason for being out of supply.
