= Film+ =

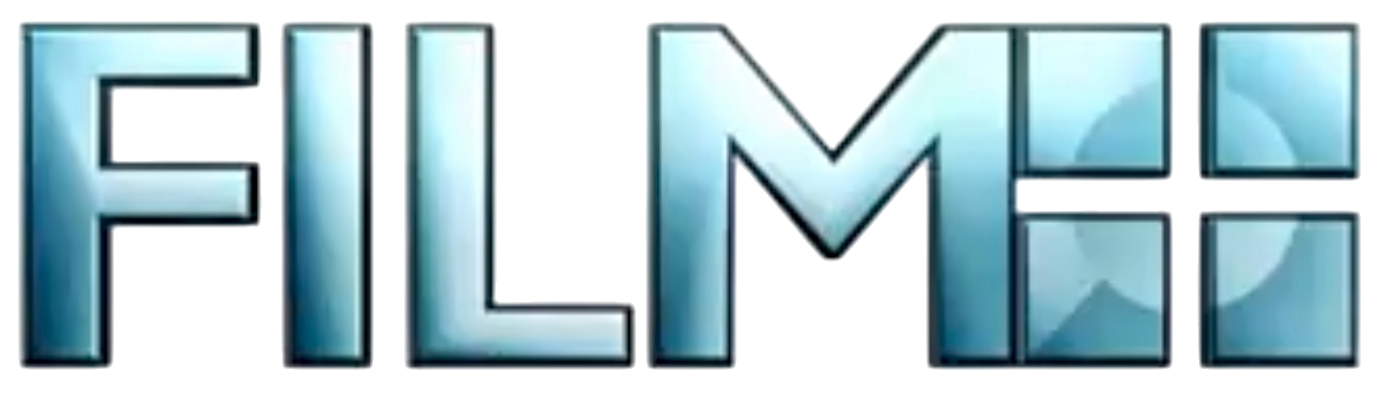
- Country: Hungary; Romania; Slovakia; Serbia; Czech Republic; Bulgaria
- Broadcast area: Hungary and their neighbouring countries
- Headquarters: Kirchberg, Luxembourg

Programming
- Picture format: 16:9 576i (SDTV); 16:9 1080i (HDTV)

Ownership
- Owner: RTL Group
- Parent: RTL Magyarország
- Sister channels: RTL; RTL Kettő; RTL Három; RTL Gold; RTL Otthon; Cool TV; Muzsika TV; Sorozat+ Sorozatklub; Moziklub; Kölyökklub

History
- Launched: September 15, 2003; 23 years ago (as F+); September 4, 2004; 22 years ago (as Film+)
- Former names: F+

Film+ is a Hungarian television channel, owned by RTL Group. The channel broadcasts 24 hours a day, and features exclusively movies. Its channel voice is Péter Tarján.

The channel's advertising time is sold by RTL Saleshouse.

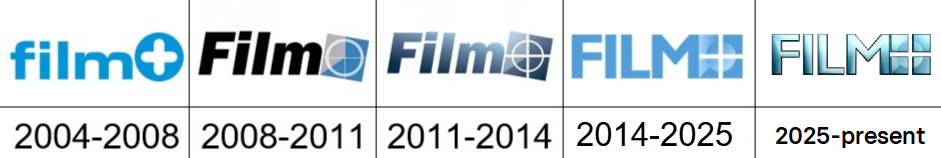
Film+ logos from 2025

== History ==
The channel was launched on September 15, 2003, as F+. Later, on September 4, 2004, the channel received its current name, while M+ and Humor 1 merged under the name Cool. Since then, it has been one of the most watched cable TV channels along with Cool. It is available in more than 2.5 million households.

Its sister channel was Film+2, which launched on April 2, 2008. It was originally made for women, with comedies, drama and romantic films, and later began to broadcast cult films. Film+2 changed its name into RTL Gold on July 3, 2017, with its schedule being completely changed.

From September 15, 2007, along with Cool, it used the Romanian rating system.

The first major change of logo and image was on September 15, 2008. Between 2009 and 2010, realistic image elements were introduced, with its logo.

On May 27, 2011, the former owner, IKO, announced another change of image. The announcement: “Film+ and Film+2 complete the IKO cable group’s film channel portfolio and to make this unit clearer to viewers, on Friday, May 27, 2011, from 21:05 CET, we will introduce the new screen ident, which is also competitive with the international movie channels. Thus, visually, a pair of channels will provide a choice for viewers who want masculine or feminine-family content.”

On December 18, 2012, along with Cool and Film+2, it switched to wide-screen.

On December 1, 2014, at 08:57 CET, another rebrand happened and also launched its HD version, being only for tests until the first day of 2015, when its headquarters became Luxembourg. Its idents were designed by Play Dead. Since March 2015, despite the new headquarters, RTL's cable channels use the Hungarian rating system.

On February 6, 2025 at 05:00, after 10 years, the channel received a new graphics package, and with it, the channel's HD designation ceased (for a few minutes there was no logo or age limit in the corner, similar to RTL+ as a TV channel's renaming to RTL Három). The package retained the music and the basic style (light blue base color, in a few identities abstract shapes) from the package used in the previous 10 years, but it was touched up and complemented by graphics showing the genre of films on the channel.
