= József Vida (banker) =

Hungarian economist (born 1973)

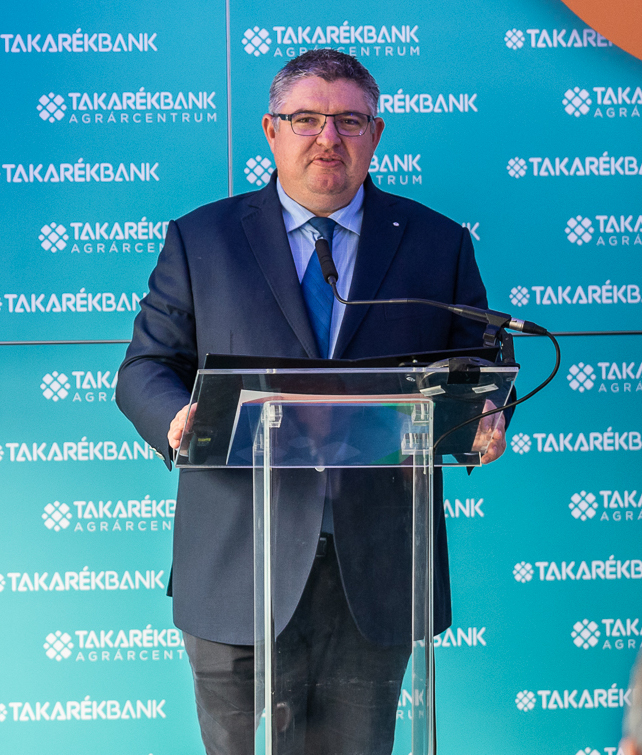
- Born: October 7, 1973 (age 52); Budapest, Hungary
- Occupations: Banker, Economist

József Vida is a Hungarian banker and economist who is chairman of the board of Opus Global, former CEO of Takarékbank, and, as of 2023, with 15 billion HUF the 98th richest person in Hungary.

== Early life and education ==
Vida was born on 7 October 1973 in Budapest. He graduated from the Budapest School of Economics, the University of Pécs, Szent István University and Université Paris-Nanterre in France.

== Career ==
Vida started his career at SODEXO Hungary where he later joined the banking sector. He started working for Citibank in 1999 and in 2001 he took on the role of Head of Department at Takarékbank. In 2006, he became the director of the Active Business Unit at Szentgál és Vidéke Takarékszövetkezet (Szentgál and Countryside Savings Bank), where he subsequently was appointed managing director. From 2007 to 2014, he served as a member of the board of the Országos Takarékszövetkezeti Szövetség (National Savings Cooperative Association). In 2015, Vida became the CEO of B3 Takarék Szövetkezet, which was formed from a merger of ten saving cooperatives. In July 2016, he joined the board of the Integration Organization of Cooperative Credit Institutions (SZHISZ), the central governing body of the Takarék Group. From 2017 until 2021, Vida was the CEO of Takarékbank. In 2019 he was elected as a member of the board of the Hungarian Banking Association. Since 1 December 2021, Vida has held the position of Chairman of Takarék Jelzálogbank (Savings Mortgage Bank). He is also a member of the board of Opus Global and has been its chairman since at least 2022. In 2019, the Goldmann Bizalmi Vagyonkezelö trust, which is owned by Vida, acquired the broadcast company TV2.

=== Work in the film industry and as an author ===
Vida co-produced the documentary "Wildlife - In the Footsteps of Count Zsigmond Széchenyi" (2019) as well as "Kittenberger - The Last Hunt" (2021). He also was involved as a producer in "The Man from Berek" (2021), "The Forgotten Széchényi Heritage: In the Footsteps of the Greatest Hungarian Horseman" (2021), "Semmelweis" (2023) and starred in the feature-length film "The Deleló Obsitos and the Black Sheep".

In 2021, Vida wrote a book about four-in-hands. Collaborating with Viktor Segal, he co-published "The Forest Crushing", a book about the Hungarian wilderness, in 2019. His cookbook "Buzzing in the Kitchen... and take a spoonful of honey!" won the silver award at the 2022 Apimondia World Beekeeping Congress.

=== Animal breeding ===
Vida is also involved in animal breeding, serving as the chairman of the supervisory board of the Association of National Associations of Hungarian Ebony Breeders (MEOESZ). He also held the position of president in both the National Association of Leonberger Ebony Breeders and the National Association of Hungarian Hovawart Ebony Breeders. He bred a world-champion Leonberger named Huszár v. Sissy-Haus and his dog Aladin became the model for a statue in Leonberg. Vida also breds other animals, especially horses.
