= Mozi+ =

- Country: Hungary
- Broadcast area: Nationwide
- Headquarters: Budapest, Hungary

Programming
- Picture format: 16:9 (SDTV)

Ownership
- Owner: TV2 Group (József Vida)
- Sister channels: TV2; FEM3; Super TV2; Spíler 1 TV; Spíler 2 TV; Izaura TV; Zenebutik; PRIME; TV2 Séf; TV2 Kids; TV2 Comedy; Jocky TV; Moziverzum

History
- Launched: 3 January 2011 (as PRO4); 11 July 2016 (as Mozi+)

Links
- Website: tv2play.hu/moziplusz

Availability

Terrestrial
- DVB-T: Channel 12

Mozi+ is a Hungarian TV channel dedicated exclusively to movies. It was launched on 3 January 2011 as PRO4. Contrary to most indigenous channels, PRO4 aired a wide array of series and movies, ranging from Hungarian and international classics to recent American films.

On 10 May 2016, Gábor Fischer announced at the Media Hungary 2016 conference that PRO4 would be repositioned as a movie channel, known as Mozi+. The rebranding took effect on 11 July 2016, at 06:00 CET, when it started airing promos with a countdown, and Mozi+ officially launched at 21:00 CET. The first movie aired on the channel was World War Z.

== Series ==
| Original title | Hungarian title | Type |
|---|---|---|
| NCIS: Los Angeles | NCIS: Los Angeles | Crime |
| Stargate: Atlantis | Csillagkapu: Atlantisz | Science-fiction |
| Tyrant | Tyrant - A vér kötelez | Action |
| American Odyssey | A túlélés ára | Action |
| Blue Bloods | Zsaruvér | Action |
| Las Vegas | Las Vegas | Action-drama |
| Continuum | Continuum | Science-fiction |
| Community | Balfékek | Sitcom |
| NUMB3RS | Gyilkos számok | Action |
| Hawaii Five-0 | Hawaii Five-0 | Action |
| Baywatch | Baywatch | Drama |
| Justified | A törvény embere | Action |

== Logos ==
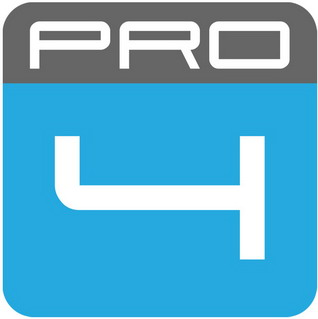
2011-2012

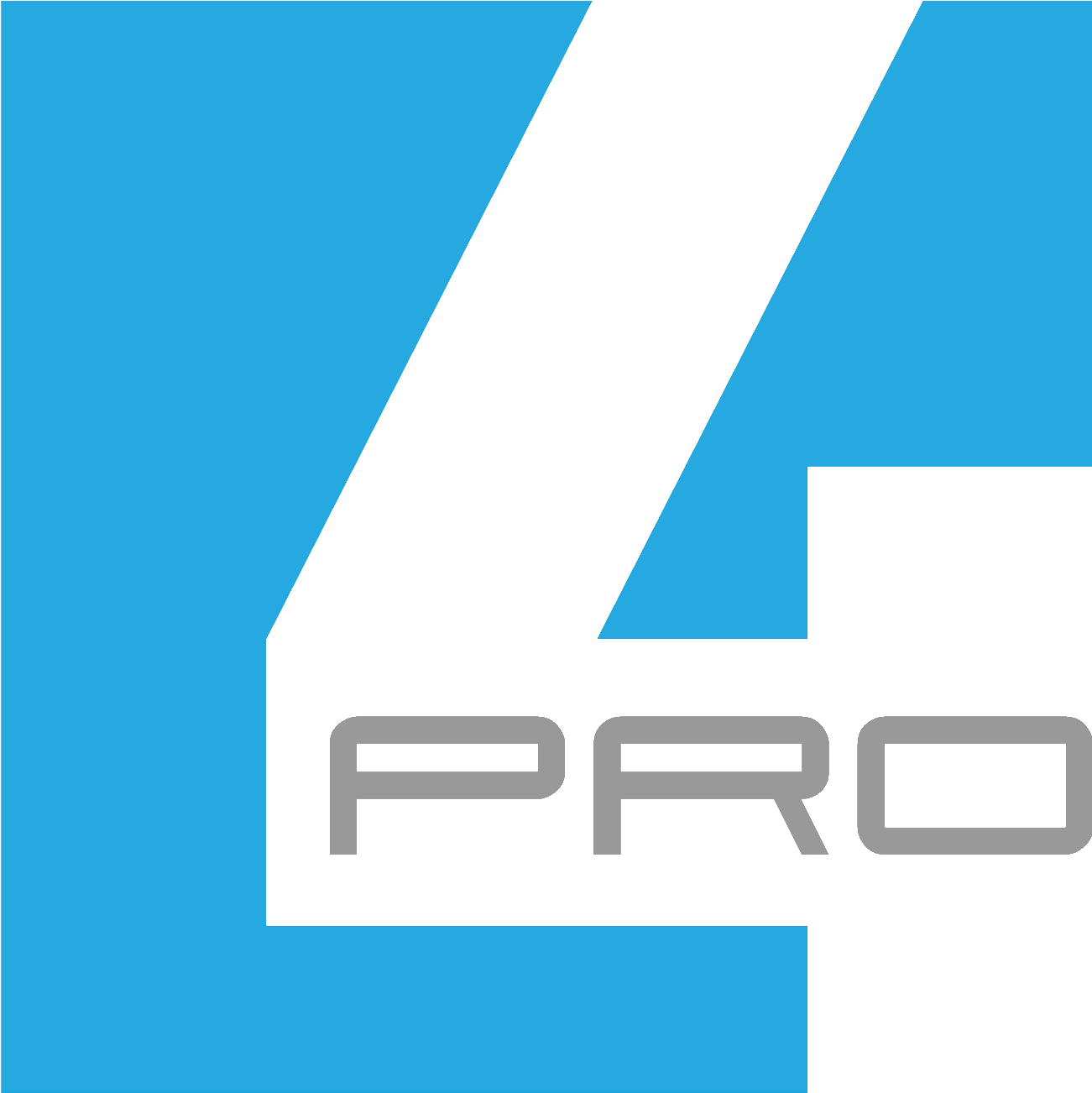
2012-2016

2016-2022

2022-present
