= ATV (Hungary) =

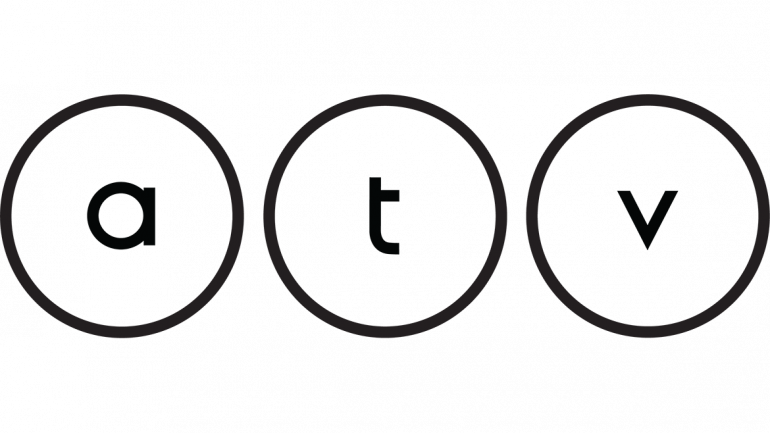
- Country: Hungary
- Broadcast area: National; also distributed in Romania and Slovakia
- Headquarters: Kőrösi Csoma Sándor út 19. 1102, Budapest

Ownership
- Owner: Broadcast Projekt Kft. (Hungary), Woodham Enterprise Ltd. (Panama)
- Sister channels: ATV Extra

History
- Launched: 2 January 1990; 36 years ago
- Former names: Agro Tv, ATV 47, Magyar ATV

Links
- Website: www.atv.hu

ATV Magyarország (formerly known as Magyar ATV) is the first Hungarian private TV channel, broadcasting continuously since 1990, with a focus on news, public life, and current events. Licensed as a partially public service commercial television station, it is obliged to broadcast public interest programs (news, current affairs, sports, religion) 50% of the time. Because of this special status, the channel is eligible to apply for grants from the government and the radio and television authority. As of 2003 the owner of the channel is the Hungarian Faith Church. It is the first private TV channel in Hungary, being established in late 1989 and airing ever since.

== Current programs ==
- The 700 Club (with Hungarian dubbing)
- A nap híre (The News of Day) - political investigation program
- ATV Híradó (ATV News)
- ATV Start - breakfast television program
- Az atv.hu bemutatja (atv.hu presents)
- CSATT (BANG) - political discussion
- Csisztu 24 -
- Egyenes beszéd (Straight Talk)
- Esti Frizbi (Evening Frisbee) - talkshow with Péter Hajdú
- Havas a pályán (Havas on the track) - political discussion and opinion program with journalist Henrik Havas
- Kipa (Kippah) - program about life of Jews in Hungary and about Israel

== Logos ==
1999–2004

2006–2011

2011–2018

== Editorial stance and criticism ==
Although the station is owned by the Hungarian Faith Church, the station is politically and editorially independent. The channel is one of a small number of broadcasters and media outlets which have been openly critical of the Fidesz-KDNP government. Members of such government and media outlets which favour the coalition have criticized its non-government-friendly programs and left-wing or liberal presenters. On recent years, the station has increased its informational and political programming, whilst maintaining a public interest format; as a result, the owners of ATV launched an additional television station, ATV Extra, available exclusively through pay-TV services, which airs more entertainment programming, including old American television series, as well as more religious programming, specially, from the Faith Church.

This editorial stance has caused some outcry, mainly due to the Faith Church's fundamentalist ideas and ATV's left-wing orientations, an issue which has caused a conflict of interests. Although the station retains its critical stance, the station has reduced some of its analytical programming due to pressure from management at the Faith Church, which has increased its association with the Fidesz-KDNP government in recent years; as a result, many presenters have departed to other opposition media outlets.

The station, as part of its transition into an informational TV channel, signed an exclusive deal with CNN International to broadcast some of its programming on its schedule, including a daily edition of CNN Newsroom; a similar deal was also signed with Deutsche Welle. Such programming is broadcast with Hungarian translation.
