= TV2 (Hungarian TV channel) =

Hungarian broadcast television network

- Logo used since 2008
- Country: Hungary
- Broadcast area: Hungary
- Headquarters: Budapest, Hungary

Programming
- Language: Hungarian
- Picture format: 1080i HDTV (downscaled to 16:9 576i for the SDTV feed)

Ownership
- Owner: TV2 Group (Lőrinc Mészáros)
- Key people: Miklós Vaszily, President–CEO; Gábor Fischer, Programming Director
- Sister channels: FEM3; Mozi+ Super TV2; Spíler 1 TV; Spíler 2 TV; Izaura TV; Zenebutik; PRIME; TV2 Séf; TV2 Kids; TV2 Comedy; Jocky TV; Moziverzum

History
- Launched: 4 October 1997
- Former names: Kérlek TV (1990-1991); 2. csatorna (1991-1995); TVH (1995-1997)

Links
- Website: tv2play.hu/tv2

Availability

Terrestrial
- Digital terrestrial television: Channel 11

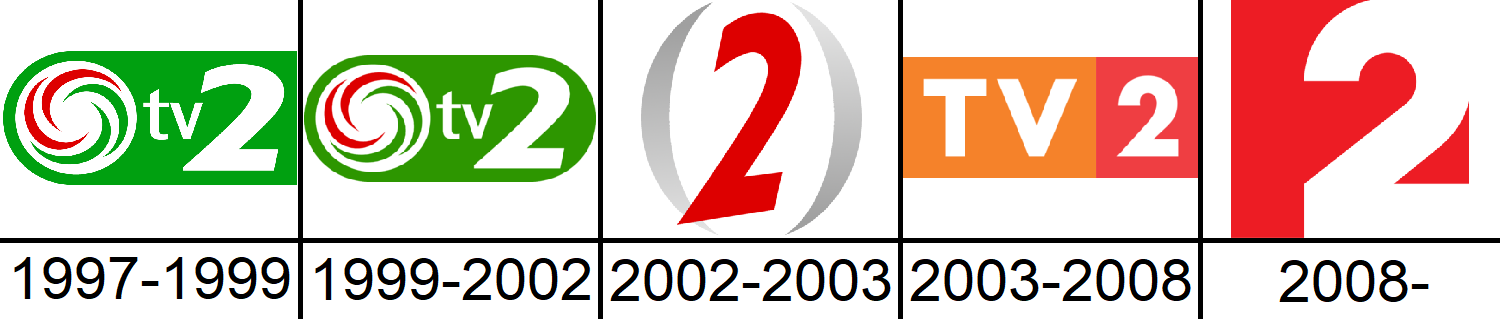

TV2 (TV Kettő) is a Hungarian free-to-air television channel operating since 4 October 1997, providing a large variety of programming. It is a competitor with RTL for the first place in Hungarian television ratings. Among its most popular self-produced shows were Megasztár ("Mega Star", an adaptation of American Idol or Pop Idol), and the daily prime time soap Jóban Rosszban, and US shows like Desperate Housewives, NCIS, NCIS: Los Angeles, Numbers, Heroes, Smallville, House M.D., Ghost Whisperer and Lipstick Jungle. TV2 is aired throughout Hungary. TV2 is also aired in Slovakia, Romania, Serbia, Croatia, Ukraine and Austria.

TV2 was one of the channels that was carried on the national analogue terrestrial service, along with M1, RTL Klub and the local channels, but those transmitters were shut down on 2 zones, on 31 July and 31 October 2013 respectively.

The current CEO is Miklós Vaszily.

== History ==
TV2 started broadcasting on October 4, 1997, three days before the start of the competitor RTL, so this channel was Hungary's first national commercial channel. It was the result of the bidding of two private licenses for a terrestrial network that only carried three channels, displacing MTV2 to cable and satellite. The company, however, had been created in 1992 and started using the TV2 name in public in 1996. The channel's logo was already registered in the summer of 1995.

The channel was initially owned by the SBS Broadcasting Group (through the company MTM-SBS Televízió Zrt.), which was bought by ProSiebenSat.1 Media AG in June 2007. At the end of 2013, the German media company sold its Hungarian and Romanian media interests. The Hungarian interest was sold to Yvonne Dederick, former financial director, and Zsolt Simon, then CEO.

In the initial period, between 1997 and 2002, the entertainment programs were produced and produced by MTM Kommunikáció Kft. After that, Interaktiv Kft. took over the production tasks until 2013. Currently, IKO Műsorgyártó Kft. is the main supplier of the channel, the company also worked for the competing channel until 2015.

TV2 was the first channel in the world to use the German-patented DOT mileage system, known locally as TAP.

On October 12, 2012, at 8:30 p.m., TV2 will broadcast The Voice – Magyarország hangja (The Voice of Hungary). began broadcasting high-definition programs with a talent search, but due to the lack of capacity, it was not realized on MinDig TV until 2013.

In 2020, TV2 was the market-leading commercial television channel in Hungary in daytime.

In February 2021, its streaming service called TV2 Play was launched, where previous programs and series can be watched.

== Ownership ==
The channel was formerly owned by SBS until 2007, when it was sold to ProSiebenSat.1 Media. It was sold to the management in 2013, and subsequently to film producer Andrew G. Vajna in 2015. Vajna died on 20 January 2019, and then the whole group was sold to Lőrinc Mészáros in June 2019.

== Sister channels ==
Its parent company, the TV2 Group, which was formed in 2013 replacing MTM-SBS, operates a portfolio which includes TV2 and its 14 sister channels. The sister channels are Super TV2, FEM3, Mozi+, Zenebutik, Izaura TV, Spíler 1 TV, Spíler 2 TV, PRIME, TV2 Séf, TV2 Kids, TV2 Comedy, Jocky TV and Moziverzum. TV2 also operated Irisz TV, which timeshared with Chellomedia's Zone Club and was broadcast at primetime between 13 September 2004 and New Year's Eve 2006, and PRO4, which was launched on 3 January 2011, and was replaced by Mozi+ on 11 July 2016.

== Current programming ==
=== Series ===
Original title	Hungarian title	Type	Original country
Under the Dome	A búra alatt	Drama	United States
The Good Wife	A férjem védelmében	Drama	United States
Early Edition	A kiválasztott - Az amerikai látnok	Drama	United States
Fairly Legal	Békétlen békítő	Comedy-drama	United States
Bűnök és szerelmek	Bűnök és szerelmek	Drama	Hungary
Családi titkok	Családi titkok	Docu-reality	Hungary
Betrugsfälle	Csapdába csalva	Docu-reality	Germany
L.A. Doctors	Doktorok	Drama	United States
Law & Order: LA	Esküdt ellenségek: Los Angeles	Drama	United States
Grimm	Grimm	Drama	United States
Jóban Rosszban	Jóban Rosszban	Drama	Hungary
Royal Pains	Luxusdoki	Comedy-drama	United States
Monk	Monk - Flúgos nyomozó	Comedy-drama	United States
NCIS	NCIS	Drama	United States
NCIS: Los Angeles	NCIS - Los Angeles	Drama	United States
The Event	Összeesküvés	Science-fiction	United States
Ringer	Ringer - A vér kötelez	Drama	United States
Elementary	Sherlock és Watson	Drama	United States
Sue Thomas: F.B.Eye	Sue Thomas: FBI	Drama	United States
Desperate Housewives	Született feleségek	Comedy	United States
Xena: Warrior Princess	Xena	Fantasy	United States; New Zealand
7th Heaven	7th Heaven	Family-drama	United States
Flashpoint	Flashpoint	Action	Canada
Joey	Joey	Sitcom	United States

=== Shows ===
Title	In English	Type	English version
9 hónap	9 months	Lifestyle	-
A Szépségkirálnyő	The Beauty Queen	Beauty contest	-
Aktív	Active	Celebrity news	-
Aktív extra	Active Extra	Celebrity news	-
Az ének iskolája	The School of Song	Talent show	Masterclass
Babavilág	Baby World	Lifestyle	-
Én is menyasszony vagyok!	I'm a Bride Too!	Reality	-
Frizbi Hajdú Péterrel	Frisbee with Péter Hajdú	Late night talk show	-
Hal a tortán	Fish on the Cake	Reality	Come Dine with Me
Legyen Ön is milliomos!	Become a millionaire!	Game show	Who Wants to Be a Millionaire?
Magyarország, jövünk!	Hungary, Here We Come!	Travel	-
Megasztár	Megastar	Talent show	Pop Idol
Mokka	Mocha	Breakfast television	-
Mr. és Mrs.	Mr. and Mrs.	Game show	All Star Mr & Mrs
Mutasd a hangod!	Show Me Your Voice!	Game show	I Can See Your Voice
Napló	Diary	News	-
TV2 Híradó	TV2 News	News	-
The Voice - Magyarország hangja	The Voice of Hungary	Talent show	The Voice

== Criticism and controversy ==
=== Takeover by Andy Vajna and relationship with government ===
Since 2015, the station has been a considered a mouthpiece for the Fidesz-KDNP coalition government. After the station was sold by ProSiebenSat.1 Media to the station's then managing directors, Zsolt Simon and Yvonne Dederick, with a loan of 25 million forints to pay the station's debts, opposition media began commenting that Károly Fonyó, the owner of a company associated with Lajos Simicska (a former pro-Fidesz media mogul who, by then, was critical of the government's plan to impose an advertising tax to competitor RTL Klub, resulting on a long-term dispute), was attempting to buy the station from both managing directors, in exchange of the payment of the aforementioned 25 million forints. As a result, Simon and Dederick began reorganising parent company MTM-SBS Kft., with both managers creating their respective holding companies, namely D6D Kft. and CCA Vízió Kft., and later making a joint venture to manage the TV2 channels. This joint venture later evolved into the current TV2 Média Csoport Kft., established by the merger of both holding companies in the summer of 2014.

At the same time, Andy Vajna, with the assistance of Prime Minister Viktor Orbán, and state-owned lender Eximbank, began negotiating with Simon and Dederick for the acquisition of the TV2 Média Csoport holding company. This led to a high-stakes acquisition process which eventually became sided in favour of Vajna. On October 13, 2015, Fonyó submitted its bid for the TV2 group of channels, which was quickly followed by Vajna's bid for the broadcaster, to which Simon and Dederick would succumb almost immediately. Vajna quickly dismissed both executives, being replaced by the former managing director of RTL Klub, Dirk Gerkens (dismissed from the channel after the heavy controversy caused by the aforementioned ad tax proposal). The editorial team of the Tények newscast was also fully replaced, with Vivien Szalai, the former editor in chief of the tabloid Story magazine, becoming the chief news director, and Nóra Kunfalvi, former Hír TV anchor, becoming the station's lead anchor.

After the Vajna takeover, the TV2 group of channels rapidly grew, from only four channels, to 13 channels. Most of these channels launched within three months, causing scepticism from many media insiders, even declaring that this massive rollout "would completely reshape the Hungarian media market". Most of these new channels became focused on niche genres, with a focus on local productions, for example, gastronomy and Hungarian cuisine, movies, music, lifestyle and even cartoons. That same year, TV2 won nearly a fifth of state advertising spending, four times more than RTL Klub, according to the independent Hungarian watchdog Mérték Media Monitor.

After Vajna's death, József Vida, the chairman of savings bank Takarékbank, took over the TV2 Group through his Abraham Goldmann Investment Trust. Vida has a close relationship with pro-Orbán businessman Lőrinc Mészáros. After taking over the group, Gerkens stepped down as CEO and Miklós Vaszily took over in the same position. He was later joined by French-Bulgarian media professional Pavel Stanchev, who has retained the station's political positions in favour of the government. However, he began to leverage the station's transition to a digital-first environment, by renaming the niche channels to make them more in line with the mother channel, and launching a centralized streaming portal, TV2 Play, where alongside catch-up programming, previous programs and series can be watched.

Vida also negotiated the station's expansion to other countries. In October 2020, TV2 bought the Slovenian commercial network Planet TV from Telekom Slovenije. The channel had suffered from financial problems and struggling ratings dating back to its launch in 2012. The merger generated heavy concerns about the station's independence as well as the increasing influence of pro-Orbán businessmen in Slovenian media, and its growing links with prime minister Janez Janša.
