= Való Világ (franchise) =

Hungarian reality television show

- Original work: Való Világ (Hungary)
- Years: 2002–present

Miscellaneous
- Genre: Reality game show
- First aired: 11 September 2002

Való Világ is a reality game show franchise developed by Magyar RTL Televízió, the Hungarian branch of RTL Group to compete with Big Brother. The first season of Való Világ launched on 11 September 2002, and has been followed by seven more seasons, as well as a Czechoslovak incarnation from 2005 titled VyVolení.

In 2015, RTL Hungary purchased the rights to produce the Hungarian version of Big Brother and announced to merge the two formats under the name Való Világ powered by Big Brother.

== Versions ==
Currently airing
An upcoming season
No longer airing

Country	Local title	Network(s)	Winner(s)	Presenter(s)
Czech Republic	VyVolení	Prima televize	Season 1 (2005): Vladko Dobrovodský; Season 2 (2006): Antonin Jalovec; Season 3 (2007): Milan Voboril; Season 4 (2013): Vladko Dobrovodský	Tereza Pergnerová (1–4); Libor Bouček (1–4); Agáta Prachařová (4); Pavel Cejnar (4); Míra Hejda (3); Diana Kobzanová (2–3); Vlastimil Korec (1–2); Iva Kubelková (1)
Hungary	Való Világ	RTL Klub	Season 1 (2002): Szabolcs Mészáros; Season 2 (2003): László Vitkó; Season 3 (2003–04): Milován Gyukin; Season 4 (2010–11): Alekosz Nagy; Season 5 (2011–12): Attila Knapp	Peti Puskás (9–); Csilla Megyeri (12–); Vanda Schumacher (11); Anikó Nádai (8–11); Bence Istenes (6–8); Lilu (3–7); Balázs Sebestyén (4–5); András Stohl (1–4); Noémi Czifra (1–2)
Hungary	Való Világ	RTL Kettő; RTL+ (stream)	Season 6 (2014): (Switzerland) Caversaccio Aurelio Onorato; Season 7 (2014–15): Dávid Mittly	Peti Puskás (9–); Csilla Megyeri (12–); Vanda Schumacher (11); Anikó Nádai (8–11); Bence Istenes (6–8); Lilu (3–7); Balázs Sebestyén (4–5); András Stohl (1–4); Noémi Czifra (1–2)
Hungary	Való Világ powered by Big Brother	RTL Kettő; RTL+ (stream)	Season 8 (2016): Soma Farkas; Season 9 (2018–19): Zsuzsanna Varga; Season 10 (2020–21): Vivien Szilágyi; Season 11 (2022–23): Krisztina Karnics	Peti Puskás (9–); Csilla Megyeri (12–); Vanda Schumacher (11); Anikó Nádai (8–11); Bence Istenes (6–8); Lilu (3–7); Balázs Sebestyén (4–5); András Stohl (1–4); Noémi Czifra (1–2)
Hungary	Való Világ powered by Big Brother	RTL+ (Main show & stream); Cool TV (Repeat)	Season 12 (2024): Ádám Farkas	Peti Puskás (9–); Csilla Megyeri (12–); Vanda Schumacher (11); Anikó Nádai (8–11); Bence Istenes (6–8); Lilu (3–7); Balázs Sebestyén (4–5); András Stohl (1–4); Noémi Czifra (1–2)
Slovakia	VyVolení	TV JOJ	Season 1 (2005): Linda Drevenková; Season 2 (2006): Erik Lakatošovie; Season 3 (2013): Igor Džadoň	Michal Hudák (1); Dušan Cinkota (2); Matej Cifra (3)
