= Celeb vagyok, ments ki innen! =

Hungarian television gameshow

- Genre: Reality television
- Based on: I'm a Celebrity...Get Me Out of Here!
- Presented by: Orsolya Sipos (2026–); Attila Árpa (2026–); Bence Istenes (2026–); Peti Puskás (2017, 2026–); Péter Kabát (2026-); Ramóna Lékai-Kiss (2017); Balázs Sebestyén (2008–2014, 2022); János Vadon (2008–2014, 2022)
- Country of origin: Hungary
- Original language: Hungarian
- No. of series: 7
- No. of episodes: 132

Production
- Executive producers: Bianka Kovács (2026–); Bertalan Tamás J. (2026–); Róbert Kovács (2026–); Gábor Nyári (2022); Gergely Kónya (2022); Péter Herman (2008–2017); Kristóf Rubin (2008–2014)
- Production locations: Rio Claro, Colombia (2022, 2026); Kruger National Park, South Africa (2014, 2017); Villa Salto Encantado, Argentina (2008)
- Production companies: Paprika Studios (2017–present); IKO Műsorgyártó Kft. (2008–2014)

Original release
- Network: RTL Klub
- Release: 6 October 2008 – present

Celeb vagyok, ments ki innen! is the Hungarian version of I'm a Celebrity...Get Me Out of Here!, RTL's survival reality show, which launched on October 6, 2008. In the show, well-known personalities move into the jungle, where they earn their own food by completing various challenges.

== History ==
The show was created in the United Kingdom, where it aired under the title I'm a Celebrity...Get Me Out of Here! (in Hungary, a literal translation was used). The essence of the reality show based and produced by ITV's then London franchise London Weekend Television (LWT), and having already visited the USA, Germany, the Netherlands, and France—is that ten famous people are sent into the jungle in Argentina, where they must earn their own food, complete tasks, and, of course, survive. Viewers vote to decide which tasks each participant must complete and who will become the king or queen of the jungle.

The first two seasons of the show were successful, bringing in an average viewership of around 2 million. The final episode of the second series was watched by approximately 2.3 million viewers in Hungary. Each season consisted of 17 episodes and a reunion show titled Celeb vagyok… újra együtt (I'm a Celebrity... Together Again).

Due to its great success, a continuation of the show was considered after the second season, but it was shelved. However, in June 2014, it was announced that 6 years after the previous two seasons, the next season of the series would launch on RTL in the autumn.

On June 10, 2026, Rekláminvázió noticed an increasing number of signs pointing to the jungle reality show's return. On the evening of July 24, 2026, the return of the show and its new hosting duo were announced on Fókusz. On July 29, 2026, it was announced on Fókusz that a third host, Attila Árpa, would also join the show. On August 4, 2026, it was announced on Fókusz that Orsolya Sipos would be the fourth host of the show.

== Filming location ==
The first two seasons of the show were filmed in Argentina on a privately owned property in the settlement of Salto Encantado, located 126 kilometers from Posadas, the capital of the northeastern Misiones Province. A crew of 250 people worked on the production—more than a hundred Hungarians, with the rest being Argentinian. Filming ran 24 hours a day with more than twenty cameras, from which the daily episode was ultimately assembled. Each episode cost over 10 million HUF to produce.Notably, there was a genuine primeval forest near the crew.

The third, fourth, and fifth seasons were filmed in the Kruger National Park in South Africa.

The sixth season was filmed in the Rio Claro Nature Reserve in Colombia.

== Series overview ==
Key
Winner – King or Queen of the Jungle
Runner-up
Third place
Late arrival

Season	Originally released		Campmates	Episodes	King or Queen of the Jungle	Runner-up	Third place	Presenters	Location
Season	First released	Last released	Campmates	Episodes	King or Queen of the Jungle	Runner-up	Third place	Presenters	Location
1	6 October 2008	22 October 2008	10	17	Mariann Falusi	Éva Horváth	Dániel Benkő	Balázs Sebestyén; János Vadon	Salto Encanto, Misiones, Argentina
2	27 October 2008	12 November 2008	11	17	Andrea Keleti	András Szőke	Ferenc Rippel	Balázs Sebestyén; János Vadon	Salto Encanto, Misiones, Argentina
3	6 October 2014	22 October 2014	10	17	Zsolt Erdei	Aurelio	Bódi Sylvi	Balázs Sebestyén; János Vadon	Kruger National Park, South Africa
4	27 October 2014	12 November 2014	11	17	Andrea Molnár	Éva Baukó	Emese Sáfrány	Balázs Sebestyén; János Vadon	Kruger National Park, South Africa
5	27 November 2017	17 December 2017	12	21	Péter Kabát	Rozina Wossala	Pumped Gabo	Ramóna Lékai-Kiss; Peti Puskás	Kruger National Park, South Africa
6	17 October 2022	6 November 2022	14	21	Curtis	Fecó Frohner	Ádám Varga	Balázs Sebestyén; János Vadon	Rio Claro, Antioquia, Colombia
7	13 September 2026	4 October 2026	17	22	G.w.M	Milán Valkusz	Odett Kármán	Orsolya Sipos; Attila Árpa; Bence Istenes; Peti Puskás; Péter Kabát	Rio Claro, Antioquia, Colombia

=== Season 1 ===
Series 1 premiered 6 October 2008 on RTL Klub and ended 22 October 2008. It is shot in Argentina. There are ten contestants in reverse order of elimination. Bottom was the first out. Top was the winner.

Celebrity	Known for	Finished
Mariann Falusi	Award-winning singer	1st
Éva Horváth	Former Miss World Hungary & television presenter	2nd
Dániel Benkő	Musician	3rd
Heni Dér	Sugarloaf singer	4th
Győzike	Reality television star & former singer	5th
Soma	Singer, presenter, & journalist	6th
Márk Zentai	Teen pop singer	7th
Sándor Bárdosi	Olympic wrestler	8th
Attila Czene	Olympic medley swimmer	9th
Patrícia Szabó	Cosmopolitan editor-in-chief	10th

=== Season 2 ===
Following on from the huge success of the first series, a second series launched on 27 October 2008, just five days after the final of series one.

Celebrity	Known for	Finished
Andrea Keleti	Dancer	1st
András Szőke	Film director, screenwriter, & actor	2nd
Ferenc Rippel	Guinness World Record-holding acrobat	3rd
Delhusa Gjon	Singer-songwriter	4th
Fekete Pákó	Singer-songwriter	5th
Oszkár Kinter	Model & television presenter	6th
Gabi Tóth	Singer	7th
Natasa Janics	Olympic sprint canoer	8th
Kristóf Steiner	Journalist & former VIVA TV presenter	9th
Linda Zimány	Model & television presenter	10th
Enikő Sütő	Model	11th

=== Season 3 ===
Celebrity	Known for	Finished
Zsolt Erdei	Professional boxer	1st
Aurelio	Való Világ winner	2nd
Bódi Sylvi	Model	3rd
Laci Gáspár	Singer-songwriter	4th
Zsófia Szabó	Actress & television presenter	5th
Fördős Zé	Food blogger & television presenter	6th
Tünde Krasznai	X-Faktor contestant	7th
Bea Gáspár	TV personality	8th
Miklós Dudás	Sprint canoeist	9th
Angéla Novák	Activist	10th

=== Season 4 ===
Celebrity	Known for	Finished
Andrea Molnár	Dancer	1st
Éva Baukó	Való Világ contestant & television presenter	2nd
Emese Sáfrány	Model & gymnast	3rd
Cooky	DJ, television & radio presenter	4th
Fekete Pákó	Singer-songwriter	5th
Peti Puskás	Singer, songwriter, actor & media personality	6th
Bunyós Pityu	Musician	7th
András Bárdos	Journalist & television presenter	8th
Zsuzsa Nyertes	Actress	9th
Krisztián Pars	Olympic hammer thrower	10th
Krisztina Hevesi	Psychologist, author & media personality	11th

=== Season 5 ===
Celebrity	Known for	Finished
Péter Kabát	Football player	1st
Rozina Wossala	Chef & media personality	2nd
Pumped Gabo	Bodybuilder, influencer & reality personality	3rd
Klaudia Halász	Media & reality personality	4th
Babett Köllő	Actress & television presenter	5th
Alexa Koholák	Reality personality & model	6th
Cicciolina	Former porn star	7th
Miklós Lukács	Television presenter	8th
Andi Tóth	Singer & X-Faktor winner	9th
Zsolt Anger	Actor	10th
Tibor Pintér	Actor, singer, director & producer	11th
Zoltán Herczeg	Fashion designer	12th

=== Season 6 ===
Celebrity	Known for	Finished
Curtis	Singer, rapper & retired footballer	1st
Fecó Frohner	Celebrity hairdresser & TV personality	2nd
Ádám Varga	Actor	3rd
Vanda Schumacher	Actress & television presenter	4th
Ferenc Lengyel	Actor & theater director	5th
Gergő gazda	Farmer & TV personality	6th
Dia Nyári	Actress	7th
VV Merci	TV personality & influencer	8th
Nini Molnár	Fashion designer, model & media personality	9th
Tibor Kocsis	Pop singer	10th
Veca Janicsák	Pop singer	11th
Viktória Jázmin	Model, beauty pageant titleholder & TV personality	12th
Rita Tallós	Actress	13th
Krisztián Zámbó	Singer & reality personality	14th

=== Season 7 ===
Celebrity	Known for	Finished
G.w.M	Rapper	1st
Milán Valkusz	Singer & rapper	2nd
Odett Kármán	Influencer & reality personality	3rd
Vini	Rapper, hip-hop artist & songwriter	4th
Rebeka Szőke	DJ & beauty pageant winner	5th
PSG Ogli	Influencer & TV personality	6th
Virág Pásztor	Actress	7th
Vivien Szalai	Media executive, editor, author & journalist	8th
Olivér Orbán	Wakeboarder	9th
Barna Fenyvesi	Reality personality	10th
Vivien Sápi	Content creator	10th
Angéla Zsigmond	Influencer & TV personality	12th
Anita Fábián	Actress	13th
Bence Szalay	Actor	13th
Patrik Zdroba	Pop/pop-opera singer, X-Faktor contender & TV personality	15th
Metta Dulin	Influencer & reality personality	16th
Dorottya Geszler	Television presenter	16th
