= Big Brother (Czech TV series) =

- Also known as: Velký Bratr
- Presented by: Eva Aichmajerová; Lejla Abbasová; Leoš Mareš
- Country of origin: Czech Republic
- Original language: Czech
- No. of seasons: 1

Production
- Production company: Endemol

Original release
- Network: TV Nova
- Release: 28 August – 18 December 2005

Related
- Big Brother

Big Brother, also known as Velký Bratr in Czech, is a reality competition television series broadcast in the Czech Republic by TV Nova in 2005. The Czech version is based on the popular Dutch Big Brother international television franchise, produced by Endemol, where a number of contestants live in an isolated house for a certain period of time. At all times, housemates are under the control of Big Brother, a rule-enforcing authority figure who monitors the behaviour of the housemates, sets tasks and punishments, and provides the only link to the outside world for the contestants.

In June 2023, TV Nova, video on demand service Voyo and Slovak TV channel Markíza announced the preparation of a Czech-Slovak version of the program.

== Original series ==
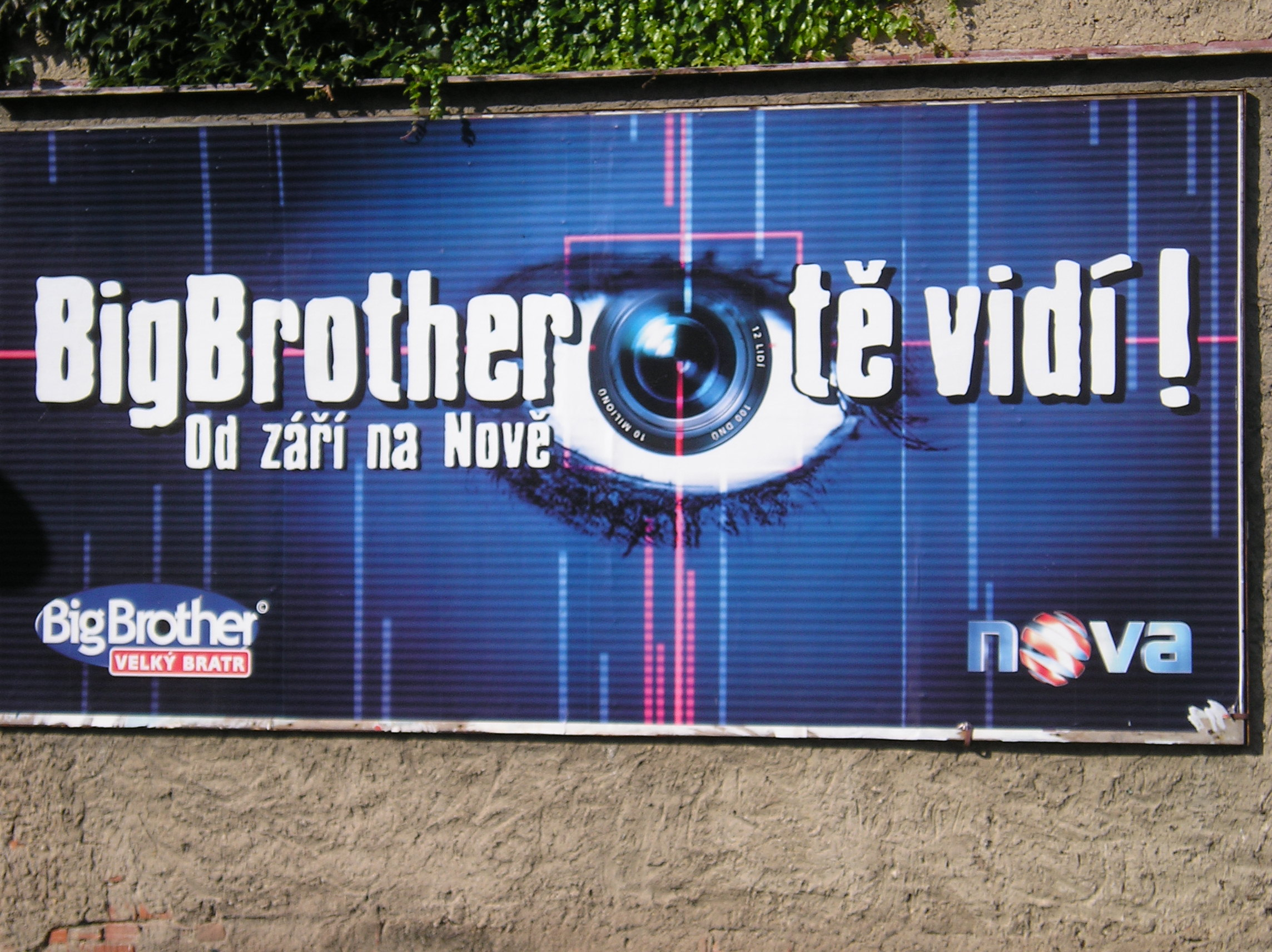
Billboard promoting the first series

The premiere saw thirteen housemates originally enter the house, with four additional people entering at various points during the programme.

The show caused controversy when contestant Filip Trojovský was recognized as gay porn star Tommy Hansen. Also a commercial model, Trjovský starred in a TV spot for a German milk-company prior to entering the house. A German tabloid revealed the scandal, causing the spot to be taken off the air. When his past became known, Trojovský became the first person to be evicted, and as a result, the ratings quickly fell. He was quickly reinstated as a housemate a few weeks later. In the end, Trojovský, who started a heterosexual relationship in the house, finished in third place.

The winner of this series was David Šin, who won the grand prize of 10,000,000 Czech koruna (400,000 Euro) after spending 113 days inside the Big Brother House.

The programme faced fierce competition from an identical show called VyVolení that aired simultaneously on the rival network TV Prima. As a result, the show suffered in the ratings and did not live up to network expectations. It was cancelled after only one season.

== Nominations table ==
	Week 1	Week 2	Week 3	Week 4	Week 5	Week 6	Week 7	Week 8	Week 9	Week 10	Week 11	Week 12	Week 13	Week 14	Week 15	Week 16 Final	
David Š	Klára	Filip; Markéta	Jaroslav; Eva	Petr S Jaroslav	Šárka; Lena	Oksana; David H	Oksana; David H	Oksana; Eva	Eva; Karel	Markéta; Eva	Eva; Sylva	Eva; Milan	Eva	Renata	Lena; Filip	Winner (Day 113)	
Eva	Nominated	Milan; Lena	Milan; Lena	Milan; Sylva	Lena; Terezie	Filip; Terezie	Oksana; David H	Sylva; Karel	Sylva; Karel	Markéta; Sylva	Sylva; Milan	Milan; Filip	Milan	Renata	Lena; Filip	Runner Up (Day 113)	
Filip	Klára	Markéta; Karel	Evicted (Day 15)		Exempt	Eva; Oksana	Markéta; Karel	Oksana; Karel	Karel; Sylva	Eva; Sylva	Sylva; Eva	Eva; Milan	David Š	Nominated	Eva; David Š	Third Place (Day 113)	
Lena	Klára	Eva; Jaroslav	Šárka; Petr B	Petr S Šárka	Šárka; Markéta	Oksana; David H	Oksana; David H	Oksana; Karel	Karel; Markéta	Markéta; David Š	Eva; Sylva	Eva; Milan	Eva	Renata	Eva; David Š	Evicted (Day 106)	
Renata	Not in House											Exempt	Milan	Nominated	Evicted (Day 99)		
Milan	Klára	Petr B Terezie	Petr B Šárka	Terezie; Šárka	Šárka; Terezie	Oksana; Terezie	Oksana; David H	Oksana; Karel	None	Eva; Sylva	Eva; Sylva	Eva; Filip	Eva	Evicted (Day 92)			
Sylva	Klára	Milan; Eva	Milan; Petr B	Petr S Milan	Eva; Lena	Oksana; David H	Oksana; David H	Oksana; Eva	Eva; Filip	Eva; Filip	Filip; Eva	Evicted (Day 78)					
Markéta	Klára	Terezie; Sylva	Šárka; Petr B	Eva; Terezie	Terezie; Eva	Oksana; David H	Oksana; David H	Oksana; Eva	Eva; Sylva	Eva; Lena	Evicted (Day 71)						
Karel	Klára	Markéta; David Š	Markéta; David Š	Petr S Milan	Milan; Lena	David H Oksana	Oksana; Eva	Oksana; Eva	Eva; Lena	Evicted (Day 64)							
Oksana	Not in House		Exempt		Karel; Šárka	David Š David H	Milan; Markéta	Markéta; Filip	Evicted (Day 57)								
David H	Not in House				Exempt	Filip; Markéta	Oksana; Markéta	Evicted (Day 50)									
Terezie	Klára	Milan; Markéta	Milan; Petr B	Milan; Šárka	Šárka; Eva	Markéta; Eva	Evicted (Day 43)										
Šárka	Klára	Terezie; Lena	Terezie; Lena	Terezie; Petr S	Milan; Lena	Evicted (Day 36)											
Petr S	Not in House		Exempt	Sylva; Šárka	Evicted (Day 29)												
Jaroslav	Klára	Petr B Eva	Petr B Eva	Šárka; Petr S	Ejected (Day 29)												
Petr B	Klára	Markéta; Jaroslav	Terezie; Milan	Evicted (Day 22)													
Klára	Nominated	Evicted (Day 1)															
Notes	1	2	none											3	none		
Against public vote	Eva, Klára	Filip, Markéta, Šárka	Milan, Petr B	Petr S, Šárka	David Š, Lena, Oksana, Šárka, Sylva	David H, Eva, Filip, Markéta, Terezie	David H, Oksana	Eva, Karel, Oksana	Eva, Karel	Eva, Markéta, Milan, Sylva	Eva, Sylva	Eva, Milan	Eva, Filip, Lena, Milan, Renata	Filip, Renata	David Š, Eva, Filip, Lena	David Š, Eva, Filip	
Ejected	none			Jaroslav	none												
Evicted	Klára; 11 of 11 votes to evict	Filip; 80% to evict	Petr B 77% to evict	Petr S 86% to evict	Filip; Most votes to return	Terezie; 7% to save	David H 34% to save	Oksana; 30% to save	Karel; 54% to evict	Markéta; 11% to save	Sylva; 10% to save	No Eviction	Milan; Most votes to evict	Renata; 3 of 3 votes to evict	Lena; Most votes to evict	Filip; 24% (out of 3)	Eva; 45% (out of 2)
Evicted	Klára; 11 of 11 votes to evict	Filip; 80% to evict	Petr B 77% to evict	Petr S 86% to evict	Šárka; 9% to save	Terezie; 7% to save	David H 34% to save	Oksana; 30% to save	Karel; 54% to evict	Markéta; 11% to save	Sylva; 10% to save	No Eviction	Milan; Most votes to evict	Renata; 3 of 3 votes to evict	Lena; Most votes to evict	David Š 55% to win	

=== Note ===
- ^1 The housemates had to choose to evict either Klára or her sister Eva. They chose to evict Klára.
- ^2 Šárka was up for eviction as she failed her secret mission which was to keep bedrooms with 3 girls and 3 boys each until Saturday. Filip was up for eviction as punishment for discussing nominations and also attempting to hide conversations from Big Brother.
- ^3 In week 14 the public nominated and the housemates voted to evict.
