= Suto =

Suto or Sütő is a surname. Notable people with the surname include:

== People ==
- Agnes Suto (born 1992), Icelandic gymnast
- András Sütő (1927–2006), Romanian politician
- Enikő Sütő (born 1958), Hungarian celebrity
- József Sütő (born 1937), Hungarian long-distance runner
- László Sütő (born 1986), Hungarian football player
- Marijan Šuto (born 1996), Croatian football player
- Masatoshi Suto (born 1945), Japanese skier
- Naoki Suto (born 2002), Japanese football player
- Petar Šuto (born 1980), Croatian football player
- Sumire Suto (born 1997), Japanese pair skater
- Suto Mamoian (born 1981), Ukrainian politician

== Other ==
- Miu Suto, Engine Sentai Go-onger character
- Iku Suto, a character from The 100 Girlfriends Who Really, Really, Really, Really, Really Love You
