= Zoltán Herczeg =

Hungarian fashion designer (born 1972)

Zoltán Herczeg Fashion Designer
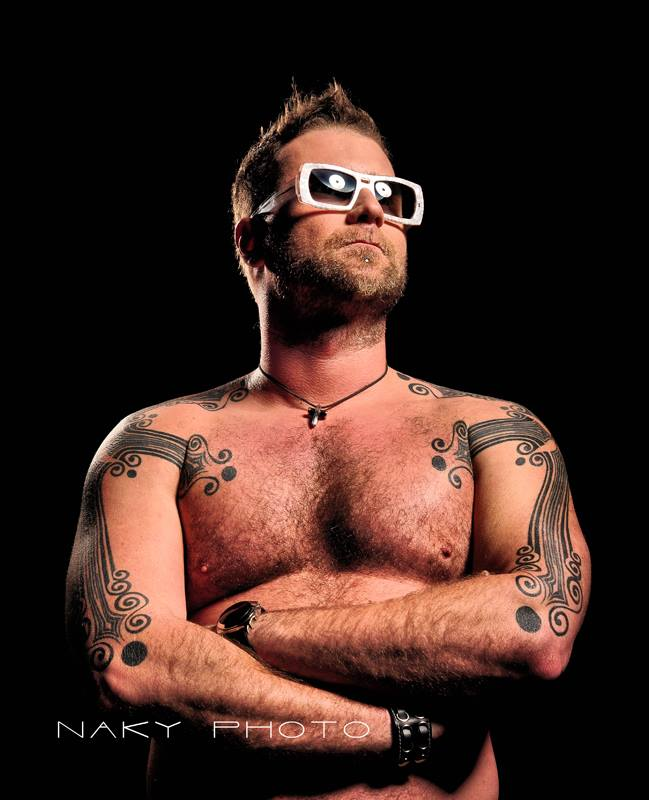
- Herczeg in 2011
- Born: Zoltán Herczeg; August 24, 1972 (age 54); Szerencs, Hungary
- Education: Corvinus University of Budapest Berzeviczy Gergely School of Trade and Catering
- Occupation: Fashion Designer
- Years active: 2005-present
- Notable work: Black Soup Hungary's Next Top Model

Zoltán Herczeg (born September 24, 1972 in Szerencs) is a Hungarian menswear fashion designer.

== Life ==
=== Childhood ===
Herczeg was born in Szerencs, Hungary and attended the Corvinus University of Economics. His first fashion commissions were designing stage-wear for childhood friends in the rock band Hooligans. In 1996 he rented a small store in downtown Budapest.

=== Fashion ===
Herczeg was nominated at the 2005 "Fashion Awards Hungary as Young Designer of the Year."

== Fashion shows ==
=== International shows ===
- Korfu – (VIVA – 2003)
- Madrid- (Luminex collection – 2004)
- Brussels – (Rába swimwear – 2008)
- Milan – (Herczeg for Arato – 2012)

=== Local shows ===
- Váci Merriness (1996)
- "Rakpart" (1997)
- Offline – PeCsa (2000)
- Budapest Fashion Week (2005)
- REVOLUTION Collection
- Herczeg-Harley-Hooligans (2005)
- Store opening (2005)
- 10-year Herczeg anniversary – Jesus 33 collextion (2006)
- Szerencs Chocolate Festival ( évente)
- Rock & Roll Collection (2007)
- The Card Collection – Napra – Gödör (2008)
- AXE (2009)
- Wamsler – Herczeg (2009)
- H1Z1- Virus collection (2009)
- Haramina collection (2010)
- Trilak – Herczeg (2010)
- HERCZEG for SUGARBIRD (2010)
- Hungarian Badass (2011)
- 15 years of Herczeg (2011)
- Herczeg & Envy Summer Fashion Show (2012)

== Movie and TV roles ==
- Szerelem utolsó vérig (Hungarian movie)
- 10-year Herczegs anniversary DVD
- The jeans
- Fish on the cake season 1 (celebrity cooking show)
- Fish on the cake season 2
- Pokerstars.hu – Staracademy TV2

== Juror ==
- Miss Tourism World (2005–2006)
- Miss Alpok-Adria (2008–2010)
- Miss Hungary (2009)
- Hajas Cut & Color Competition (2007–2012)
- Singers League TV2 (2007) TV SHOW
- Topmodell – Viasat (2006) TV Show

== Awards ==
- Best Dressed Band in Hungary – (Ifjúsági Magazin 1999)
- Young Designer of the Year nomination – ( Hungarian Fashion Awards – 2005)
- Man of The Style winner in "extravagant" category – ( Playboy Magazin 2011)
- Red Bull Hungarian Ambassador (2006– )
- PUMA Hungarian Ambassador (2010/2011)
