= Viktória Vámosi =

Hungarian model (born 1974)

- Born: 1974 (age 51–52); Budapest, Hungary
- Occupations: Model; host

Viktória Vámosi (born 1974) is a Hungarian former model. She was born in Budapest, Hungary. She has modeled for L'Oreal, Harrods, and Hermès, and was the original host of Topmodell, the Hungarian version of America's Next Top Model.
