= Next Top Model Hungary (season 2) =

- Season 2
- Judges: Péter Merő; Szabina Tomán; Vanessa Axente; Zoltán Tombor
- No. of contestants: 16
- Winner: Liliána 'Lili' Mészáros

Release
- Original network: TV2
- Original release: 17 March – 2 June 2024

Season chronology
- ← Previous; Season 1 Next → Season 3

The second season of Next Top Model Hungary aired from March to June 2024 on TV2.

The show returned with Nóra Ördög as the new host, along with brand new judges: entrepreneur Szabina Tomán, fashion photographer Zoltán Tombor, fashion designer Péter Merő and fashion model Vanessa Axente.

The international destinations for this cycle are Los Cristianos and Sankt Leonhard.

Among with prizes were: an exclusive 2-year modeling contract with Icon Model Management, appear on the cover and editorial spreads for Joy magazine, become the Hungarian ambassador of Schwarzkopf Gliss, take part in Budapest Central European Fashion Week 2025 and a cash prize of 10,000,000 Ft ($27,700).

The winner of the competition was 26-year old Lili Mészáros from Tapioszecso.

== Contestants ==
Ages stated are as of the beginning of the contest

Contestant	Age	Height	Hometown	Finish	Place
Léda Anna Polgári	22	1.80 m (5 ft 11 in)	Miskolc	Episode 2	16
Laura Korik	28	1.79 m (5 ft 10 1/2 in)	Budapest	Episode 3	15-14
Vanessza Kapusi	24	1.83 m (6 ft 0 in)	Budapest	Episode 3	15-14
Anna Alföldy	30	1.72 m (5 ft 7 1/2 in)	Budapest	Episode 4	13
Naledi Ncube	22	1.64 m (5 ft 4 1/2 in)	Budapest	Episode 5	12
Lili Keveházi	19	1.73 m (5 ft 8 in)	Budapest	Episode 6	11
Kitti Léda Szaniszló	23	1.69 m (5 ft 6 1/2 in)	Budapest	Episode 7	10
Anastasia Moritz	18	1.76 m (5 ft 9 1/2 in)	Százhalombatta	Episode 9	9-8
Panna Baranyi	24	1.74 m (5 ft 8 1/2 in)	Budapest	Episode 9	9-8
Cintia Csordás	22	1.76 m (5 ft 9 1/2 in)	Lakitelek	Episode 10	7
Gabriella 'Gabi' Papp	34	1.77 m (5 ft 9 1/2 in)	Bristol, England	Episode 11	6-5
Lili Jávori	20	1.76 m (5 ft 9 1/2 in)	Rábapatona	Episode 11	6-5
Hawa Krisztina Kouyaté	22	1.82 m (5 ft 11 1/2 in)	Budapest	Episode 12	4
Vivien Vidéki	30	1.78 m (5 ft 10 in)	Szeged	Episode 12	3
Nikolett Czibolya	29	1.75 m (5 ft 9 in)	Sándorfalva	Episode 12	2
Liliána 'Lili' Mészáros	26	1.79 m (5 ft 10 1/2 in)	Tapioszecso	Episode 12	1

== Episode summaries ==
No. overall	No. in season	Title	Original release date
14	1	"Episode 1"	17 March 2024
29 semi-finalists were selected to take part in the casting process and 19 contestants survive after the first elimination. The next day, the remaining were taken to the Budapest Museum of Ethnology for a fashion show challenge wearing designs from creative director Márk Kiss. 16 girls were selected to move into the model house.: Challenge winner: Lili Mészáros
15	2	"Episode 2"	24 March 2024
The girls receiving their makeovers and tasked with showing off their new looks in their first photoshoot. Afterward, they receive dancing lessons to help them later on when they shoot the opening sequence of the show in groups. The winning group will receive immunity from elimination while the losing group will at risk of being eliminated.: Immune: Anna Alföldy, Hawa Kouyaté, Laura Korik & Lili Mészáros; Up for elimination: Gabi Papp, Lili Jávori, Lili Keveházi & Naledi Ncube; Best photo: Gabi Papp; First bottom two: Cinita Csordás & Léda Polgári; Eliminated: Léda Polgári; Second Bottom two: Lili Keveházi & Naledi Ncube; Eliminated: Lili Keveházi; Featured photographer: Norbert Zsolyomi; Special guests: Lajos Túri, Bence Nagy
16	3	"Episode 3"	31 March 2024
The 14 remaining arrives in Tenerife. For their photoshoot, the girls are tasked to work together in groups. Following this, they are then taken to a near-by public beach for a fashion show in front of the judges. In a twist of events, there is a shock return of one of last week's eliminated contestants, followed by two girls who are sent home.: Best photo: Nikolett Czibolya; First bottom two: Panna Baranyi & Vanessza Kapusi; Eliminated: Vanessza Kapusi; Returned to the competition: Lili Keveházi; Second Bottom two: Anastasia Moritz & Laura Korik; Eliminated: Laura Korik; Featured photographer: Wanda Martin
17	4	"Episode 4"	7 April 2024
This week, the girls must prove they can sell the products in social media. The next day, they must show raw emotion in a shoot inspired by America's Next Top Model's cycle 15 "power word" photoshoot. The next day, they have to balance on a floating catwalk while walking on a long-sleeved dresses.: Best photo: Panna Baranyi; Bottom two: Anna Alföldy & Vivien Vidéki; Eliminated: Anna Alföldy; Featured photographer: Bálint Trunkó; Special guests: Diána Sirokai
18	5	"Episode 5"	14 April 2024
The remaining 12 girls get to know each other closer as Nóra ask them some questions. The next day, they have to float on the Lake Hévíz in pairs for a photoshoot recreate the famous John Everett Millais' painting "Ophelia". The next day, they had a fashion show challenge in flames with their hands were set on fire along with the fire performers.: Best photo: Vivien Vidéki; Bottom two: Hawa Krisztina Kouyaté & Naledi Ncube; Eliminated: Naledi Ncube; Featured photographer: Wanda Martin; Special guests: Mirjam Lőrinczi, Márton Jeddi, Patrícia Kuti, Rai Brunner, Feriencsik Bandi
19	6	"Episode 6"	21 April 2024
The remaining 11 girls get to interact with horses, which will come handy in the next beauty shoot will flowers and animals the day after. The next day, the girls had their next fashion show challenge as French girls while walking a dog.: Best photo: Lili Jávori; Bottom two: Lili Keveházi & Panna Baranyi; Eliminated: Lili Keveházi; Featured photographer: Ábel Fülöp-Pál
20	7	"Episode 7"	28 April 2024
The girls got to show their creativity as they work in groups to create an outfit using single-use plastic items, and one of them would have to model in it. The next day, they had an underwater photoshoot as mermaids around recycled materials. The next day, they had a fashion show challenge in a design outfit made from recycled trash. During the judging, one model was hospitalized due to feeling unwell.: Best photo: Hawa Kouyaté; Bottom two: Anastasia Moritz & Kitti Szaniszló; Eliminated: Kitti Szaniszló; Featured photographer: Oleg Borisuk; Special guests: Anita Korn
21	8	"Episode 8"	5 May 2024
The models got to see the positive in each other as they were paired up to give each other words of encouragement. The next day, they were out of their comfort zone in an artistic nude photoshoot in the dark and 2 models might not handle it. The next day, they were challenged to perform a fashion show in black lingerie in front of the judges and an audience of their loved ones, before the lucky ones got to talk to them. During the judging, no one was eliminated but Nóra announced that the 2 models will receive the punishment for not completing the photoshoot's request.: Best photo: Vivien Vidéki; Bottom two: Gabi Papp & Hawa Kouyaté; Originally eliminated but saved: Gabi Papp; Featured photographer: Oleg Borisuk; Special guests: Rea Kafiya
22	9	"Episode 9"	12 May 2024
The remaining 9 girls were flown to Imst and work in pairs for a swimsuit and thick coats photoshoot in -10 °C weather, with the 2 models only get 5 shots due to the punishment. The next day, the girls were challenged to perform a fashion show in on a snowy ground.: Best photo: Nikolett Czibolya; First Eliminated: Panna Baranyi; Bottom two: Anastasia Moritz & Cintia Csordás; Second Eliminated: Anastasia Moritz; Featured photographer: Attila Udvardi
23	10	"Episode 10"	19 May 2024
The girls transform into superheros in the air for a rock climbing photoshoot. The next day, they had a workout before competing in pairs for an obstacle course challenge. The next day, the girls disguise themselves as diamond thieves for the runway challenge start from the upper floors of the Erkel Theatre to the ground.: Challenge winner: Lili Jávori; Best photo: Gabi Papp; Bottom two: Cintia Csordás & Hawa Kouyaté; Eliminated: Cintia Csordás; Featured photographer: Norbert Zsolyomi; Special guests: Gusztáv Dietz
24	11	"Episode 11"	26 May 2024
The remaining 6 girls were paired up for a go-see challenge. The next day, they were transformed into femme fatale while posing with the male models. To determine who will be in the final, they face a runway challenge in nude lingerie while being bombarded with confetti and birthday spray.: Best photo: Lili Mészáros; First Eliminated: Gabi Papp; Bottom two: Hawa Kouyaté & Lili Jávori; Second Eliminated: Lili Jávori; Featured photographer: Pál Nánási; Special guests: Zsuzsanna Szak, Anna Siba, Andris Tar, Dan Zsolt, Laca Horvath
25	12	"Episode 12"	2 June 2024
The 4 finalist got a dance rehearsal with 3 male dancers for the final challenge, before having their last photoshoot showcasing their natural look and a talk with Szabina. The next day final judging, they have a fashion show in Péter Merő designs with the 12 eliminated girls and performed a dance routine with 3 male dancers, which resulted in Hawa have been eliminated. Lili M., Nikolett & Vivien later presented the 2 final fashion shows: in designs by Virág Kerényi with a performance by Viktor Király & Dr Brs and in designs by Márk Kiss. In the end, Lili M. became the winner of Next Top Model Hungary.: Final four: Hawa Kouyaté, Lili Mészáros, Nikolett Czibolya & Vivien Vidéki; Bottom two: Hawa Kouyaté & Lili Mészáros; Eliminated: Hawa Kouyaté; Final three: Lili Mészáros, Nikolett Czibolya & Vivien Vidéki; Eliminated: Vivien Vidéki; Final two: Lili Mészáros & Nikolett Czibolya; Next Top Model Hungary: Lili Mészáros; Featured photographer: Zoltán Tombor; Special guests: András Suti, Bertalan Hegyes, Dávid Baranya, Viktor Király, Dr Brs

== Results table ==
Place	Model	Episodes												
Place	Model	1 (Note: Episode 1 is the casting episode. After the catwalk challenge, Nóra only names the 4 best performers, the 2 worst performers and the 2 semi-finalists are eliminated. The rest are safe.)	2 (Note: In episode 2, Anna, Hawa, Laura & M. Lili were immune from elimination for winning the challenge.)	3 (Note: In episode 3, the contestants were evaluated and called out in pairs. In addition, Lili K. was brought back into the competition by the judges.)	4	5	6	7 (Note: In episode 7, Vivien had to be taken to the hospital due to feeling unwell, but she was safe from the elimination. When Hawa was called forward to receive her photo, Nóra gave Vivien's photo to Hawa.)	8	9 (Note: In episode 9, the contestants are judged and called out in pairs.)	10	11	12	
1	Lili M.	SAFE	IMM	SAFE	SAFE	SAFE	SAFE	SAFE	SAFE	SAFE	SAFE	HIGH	LOW	WINNER
2	Nikolett	SAFE	SAFE	HIGH	SAFE	SAFE	SAFE	SAFE	SAFE	HIGH	SAFE	SAFE	SAFE	OUT
3	Vivien	LOW	SAFE	SAFE	LOW	HIGH	SAFE		HIGH	SAFE	SAFE	SAFE	SAFE	OUT
4	Hawa	SAFE	IMM	SAFE	SAFE	LOW	SAFE	HIGH	LOW	SAFE	LOW	LOW	OUT	
6-5	Lili J.	SAFE	LOW	SAFE	SAFE	SAFE	HIGH	SAFE	SAFE	SAFE	SAFE	OUT		
6-5	Gabi	SAFE	HIGH	SAFE	SAFE	SAFE	SAFE	SAFE	OUT	SAFE	HIGH	OUT		
7	Cintia	SAFE	LOW	SAFE	SAFE	SAFE	SAFE	SAFE	SAFE	LOW	OUT			
8–9	Anastasia	LOW	SAFE	LOW	SAFE	SAFE	SAFE	LOW	SAFE	OUT				
8–9	Panna	SAFE	SAFE	SAFE	HIGH	SAFE	LOW	SAFE	SAFE	OUT				
10	Kitti	SAFE	SAFE	SAFE	SAFE	SAFE	SAFE	OUT						
11	Lili K.	SAFE	OUT		SAFE	SAFE	OUT							
12	Naledi	SAFE	LOW	SAFE	SAFE	OUT								
13	Anna	SAFE	IMM	SAFE	OUT									
14-15	Laura	SAFE	IMM	OUT										
14-15	Vanessza	SAFE	SAFE	OUT										
16	Léda	SAFE	OUT											

The contestant was immune from elimination
The contestant was originally eliminated from the competition but was saved
The contestant won best photo
The contestant was in danger of elimination
The contestant was eliminated
The contestant won the competition

=== Photo shoot guide ===
- Episode 2 photo shoot: Makeover
- Episode 3 photo shoot: Posing on the pool balcony in Tenerife (group and individual)
- Episode 4 photo shoot: "Power" words
- Episode 5 photo shoot: Floating on the lake in pairs
- Episode 6 photo shoot: Beautyshot with flowers and animals
- Episode 7 photo shoot: Underwater recycled mermaid
- Episode 8 photo shoot: Artistic nude in the dark
- Episode 9 photo shoot: Swimsuits and coats in pair
- Episode 10 photo shoot: Rock Climbing Superhero
- Episode 11 photo shoot: B&W Femme fatale with male models
- Episode 12 photo shoot: Natural beauty (portrait and full-body)
