= Celeb vagyok, ments ki innen! season 7 =

Celeb vagyok, ments ki innen!
- Season 7
- Presented by: Orsolya Sipos; Attila Árpa; Bence Istenes; Peti Puskás; Péter Kabát
- No. of castaways: 17
- Location: Rio Claro, Antioquia, Colombia
- No. of episodes: 22

Release
- Original network: RTL Klub
- Original release: 13 September – 4 October 2026

Celeb vagyok, ments ki innen! returned for its seventh series on 13 September 2026 on RTL, and was again filmed in Colombia.

== Celebrities ==
Celebrity	Known for	Status
G.w.M	Rapper	King of the Jungle on 04 October 2026
Milán Valkusz	Singer & rapper	2nd place on 04 October 2026
Odett Kármán	Influencer & reality personality	3rd place on 04 October 2026
Vini	Rapper, hip-hop artist & songwriter	Evicted 11th on 4 October 2026
Rebeka Szőke	DJ & beauty pageant winner	Evicted 10th on 3 October 2026
PSG Ogli	Influencer & TV personality	Evicted 9th on 2 October 2026
Virág Pásztor	Actress	Evicted 8th on 1 October 2026
Vivien Szalai	Media executive, editor, author & journalis	Evicted 7th on 30 September 2026
Olivér Orbán	Wakeboarder	Evicted 6th on 29 September 2026
Barna Fenyvesi	Reality personality	Evicted 5th on 27 September 2026
Vivien Sápi	Content creator	Evicted 5th on 27 September 2026
Angéla Zsigmond	Influencer & TV personality	Evicted 4th on 25 September 2026
Anita Fábián	Actress	Evicted 3rd on 22 September 2026
Bence Szalay	Actor	Evicted 3rd on 22 September 2026
Patrik Zdroba	Pop/pop-opera singer, X-Faktor contender & TV personality	Evicted 2nd on 20 September 2026
Metta Dulin	Influencer & reality personality	Evicted 1st on 17 September 2026
Dorottya Geszler	Television presenter	Evicted 1st on 17 September 2026

== Results and elimination ==
Indicates that the celebrity received the fewest votes and was eliminated immediately
Indicates one of the presenters who lived with the celebrities
Indicates that the celebrity was named with the fewest votes

Daily results per celebrity
Celebrity	Day 5	Day 8	Day 10	Day 13	Day 15	Day 17	Day 18	Day 19	Day 20	Day 21	Grand Finale		Number of trials	Number of treasure hunts
Celebrity	Day 5	Day 8	Day 10	Day 13	Day 15	Day 17	Day 18	Day 19	Day 20	Day 21	Round 1	Round 2	Number of trials	Number of treasure hunts
G.w.M	Safe	Safe	Safe	Safe	Safe	Safe	Safe	Safe	Safe	Safe	Safe	Winner (Day 23)	7	5
Miló	Safe	Safe	Safe	Safe	Safe	Safe	Safe	Safe	Safe	Safe	Safe	2nd place (Day 23)	6	8
Odett	Safe	Safe	Safe	Safe	Safe	Safe	Bottom 2	Safe	Safe	Safe	Safe	3rd place (Day 23)	0	8
Vini	Safe	Safe	Safe	Safe	Safe	Safe	Safe	Safe	Bottom 2	Safe	4th	Evicted (Day 22)	8	6
Rebeka	Safe	Safe	Safe	Safe	Safe	Bottom 3	Safe	Safe	Safe	5th	Evicted (Day 21)		5	7
Ogli	Safe	Safe	Safe	Safe	Bottom 4	Safe	Safe	Bottom 2	6th	Evicted (Day 20)			4	5
Virág	Safe	Safe	Safe	Safe	Safe	Safe	Safe	7th	Evicted (Day 19)				3	5
Vivien	Safe	Safe	Safe	Safe	Bottom 4	Bottom 3	8th	Evicted (Day 18)					5	0
Olivér	Safe	Safe	Bottom 4	Safe	Safe	9th	Evicted (Day 17)						2	1
Barna	Safe	Safe	Safe	Safe	10th	Evicted (Day 15)							2	1
Vivi	Safe	Safe	Safe	Safe	10th	Evicted (Day 15)							2	1
Angi	Safe	Safe	Bottom 4	12th	Evicted (Day 13)								3	3
Anita	Safe	Safe	13th	Evicted (Day 10)									0	1
Bence	Safe	Safe	13th	Evicted (Day 10)									0	1
Patrik	Safe	15th	Evicted (Day 8)										1	1
Metta	16th	Evicted (Day 5)											1	1
Dorottya	16th	Evicted (Day 5)											0	1
Péter (Presenter)	-												0	1
Attila (Presenter)	-												1	0
Fewest votes (named in)	None		Angi, Anita, Bence, Olivér	None	Barna, Ogli, Vivi, Vivien	Olivér, Rebeka, Vivien	Odett, Vivien	Ogli, Virág	Ogli, Vini	None				
Eliminated	Metta & Dorottya	Patrik	Anita & Bence	Angi	Barna & Vivi	Olivér	Vivien	Virág	Ogli	Rebeka	Vini			

== Trials and Treasure hunts ==
The contestants take part in daily trials to earn food. These trials aim to test both physical and mental abilities. The winner is usually determined by the number of stars collected during the trial, with each star representing a meal earned by the winning contestant for their fellow campmates.

From Day 16 the campmates got separated into 2 teams where the winning team of the trials got to live in the luxurious part of the camp.

Team A	Team B
Odett	Rebeka
Vivien	G.w.M
Virág	Ogli
Miló	Vini
Olivér	-

The public voted for who they wanted to face the trial
The trial was compulsory and neither the public nor celebrities decided who took part

Trial number	Air date	Celebrity participation		Number of stars/ Items earned
1	14 September	G.w.M; Miló; Patrik		Bathroom parts
2	14 September	Angi; G.w.M		14/17 stars
3	15 September	Vini		Failed
4	15 September	Vivi; Vini		4/18 stars
5	16 September	Anita; Metta; Barna; Ogli		Kids toilet
6	15 September	Ogli		0/18 stars
7	17 September	Dorottya; Virág; Olivér		Soft side pool
8	17 September	Metta; Vivien; G.w.M; Miló		18/18 stars
9	18 September	Rebeka; Bence		Rescued kidnapped campmate, Virág; Got back stolen personal items
10	18 September	Patrik; Vini		7/16 stars
11	19 September	Odett; Miló		Ice cream
12	19 September	Vivien; Attila		11/16 stars
13	20 September	Angi; Ogli		Small portion of food
14	20 September	Barna		13/16 stars
15	21 September	Rebeka		Breakfast for every campmate
16	21 September	Angi; Rebeka; Vivi		5/14 stars
17	22 September	Odett; G.w.M		Herbs
18	22 September	G.w.M; Vini		11/14 stars
19	23 September	Vivi		Fruits
20	23 September	Virág; Vivien; Miló; Ogli		5/15 stars
21	24 September	Angi; Miló		Failed
22	24 September	Angi; Rebeka; Barna; Olivér; Vini		Solar panel
21	25 September	Angi; Vini		7 million peso worth of bank card
22	25 September	Virág; Ogli		12/12 stars
23	26 September	Péter		Salt, sugar and paprika
24	26 September	G.w.M; Vini		11/11 stars
25	27 September	Odett; Virág; Miló; Ogli		Cake
26	27 September	Vivien; Miló; Ogli		5/11 stars
27	28 September	Ogli; Vini		Cloth cleaning supplies
28	28 September	Team A	Team B	Winner: Team B The privilege to live in the luxurious part of the camp
28	28 September	Miló Olivér	Rebeka Vini	Winner: Team B The privilege to live in the luxurious part of the camp
29	29 September	Team A	Team B	Winner: Rebeka; The privilege to stay in the luxurious part of the camp
29	29 September	Odett	Rebeka	Winner: Rebeka; The privilege to stay in the luxurious part of the camp
30	29 September	Team A	Team B	Winner: Team A Possibility to win the privilege to live in the luxurious part of the camp in the next treasure hunt
30	29 September	Miló; Virág; 8 points	Rebeka; Vini; 3 points	Winner: Team A Possibility to win the privilege to live in the luxurious part of the camp in the next treasure hunt
31	30 September	Team A	Team B	Winner: Team B The privilege to stay in the luxurious part of the camp
31	30 September	Miló; Virág; 1 points	Rebeka; Vini; 4 points	Winner: Team B The privilege to stay in the luxurious part of the camp
32	30 September	Team A	Team B	Winner: Vivien; Team A moves to the luxurious part of the camp and Team B moves back to the regular side
32	30 September	Vivien	G.w.M	Winner: Vivien; Team A moves to the luxurious part of the camp and Team B moves back to the regular side
33	01 October	Team A	Team B	Cheesburger and fries for 2 campmate from each team
33	01 October	Virág	Rebeka	Cheesburger and fries for 2 campmate from each team
34	01 October	Team A	Team B	Winner: Miló; 17 pieces of leftover Hot-Dog
34	01 October	Miló	G.w.M	Winner: Miló; 17 pieces of leftover Hot-Dog
35	02 October	Odett; Rebeka; Virág; G.w.M; Miló		Winner: G.w.M; Possibility to have a phone call home and give this opportunity to one another campmate. He choose Miló
36	02 October	Vini		Salt, Coffee, Sugar and a calendar
37	03 October	Odett; Ogli		Failed
38	03 October	Rebeka; G.w.M		5/5 stars
39	04 October	Odett; G.w.M; Vini		Failed
40	04 October	Rebeka; Miló		Food for last nights party
41	04 October	Odett; G.w.M; Miló; Vini		Dessert for last nights party

== Star count ==
Celebrity	Number of stars earned	Percentage
G.w.M	59/65 stars	90,7%
Miló	38/54 stars	70,3%
Odett	0/0 stars	-
Vini	43/69 stars	62,3%
Rebeka	30/41 stars	73,1%
Ogli	22/56 stars	39,2%
Virág	17/27 stars	62,9%
Vivien	39/60 stars	69,3%
Olivér	18/22 stars	81,8%
Barna	23/28 stars	82,1%
Vivi	19/44 stars	43,1%
Angi	31/41 stars	75,6%
Anita	0/0 stars	-
Bence	0/0 stars	-
Patrik	7/16 stars	43,7%
Metta	18/18 stars	100%
Dorottya	0/0 stars	-
Attila	11/16 stars	68,7%
