= Villa Salto Encantado =

- Municipality and village
- Location within Misiones Province Location within Argentina
- Country: Argentina
- Province: Misiones Province
- Time zone: UTC−3 (ART)

Villa Salto Encantado is a village and municipality in Misiones Province in north-eastern Argentina.
