= Való Világ season 12 =

Twelfth season of the Hungarian reality show Való Világ

Való Világ
- Season 12
- Presented by: Peti Puskás; Csilla Megyeri
- No. of days: 85
- No. of contestants: 15
- Winner: Ádi (Ádám Farkas)
- Runner-up: Kikidi Kékes

Release
- Original network: RTL+ ( (all shows and live stream)); RTL (launch night only); Cool (daily recaps repeat)
- Original release: 5 May – 28 July 2024

Season chronology
- ← Previous; Season 11

Való Világ 12 was the twelfth season of the Hungarian reality television series Való Világ. It is the fifth season based on the Big Brother license. The season premiered on 5 May 2024 and concluded on 28 July 2024, lasting 85 days. The show was hosted by Peti Puskás and Csilla Megyeri.

The season was predominantly aired on a streaming platform RTL+, which also provided a 24-hour live stream of the Villa. Edited daily recaps (Összefoglaló) were aired first on RTL+ each evening and subsequently repeated on the linear television channel Cool. The moving-in show Beköltözés show broadcast on 5 May was also shown simultaneously on RTL.

The season featured 15 contestants. Ádi (Ádám Farkas) won the season. The final prize fund was 37.65 million Hungarian forints.

== Format and development ==
Following the conclusion of the eleventh season in 2023, RTL announced applications for a twelfth season of Való Világ in February 2024. RTL described that contestants would compete for a cash prize equivalent to several years of salary. The broadcaster also announced that the new season would be available both on television and throughout the day on the RTL+ streaming platform.

The twelfth season was scheduled to begin on 5 May 2024. RTL announced that the season would introduce a substantially expanded streaming component, with RTL+ subscribers able to watch the Villa continuously for 24 hours a day in addition to the programmes.

=== Production ===
The production used a continuous live streaming infrastructure for the Villa. In July 2024, RTL reported that, after 61 days of the season, almost 1,500 hours of live footage had already been broadcast through RTL+, while approximately 50 people worked on the production each day and more than 200 people were involved in the production overall.

According to RTL's production report, the Villa was monitored using 58 cameras, with a control room responsible for selecting the camera feeds used for the live stream. The report described the live production as operating continuously while the contestants remained in the Villa.

=== Broadcasting ===
The twelfth season premiered on 5 May 2024. The moving-in show Beköltözés show was broadcast live simultaneously on RTL+ and TV channel RTL, beginning at 21:00.

RTL announced that the daily recaps show Összefoglaló would premiere on RTL+ at 20:00, while the same episode would subsequently be broadcast on the television channel Cool at 22:00.

RTL's official participation and voting regulations provide a further distinction between the two forms of broadcasting. The regulations state that Való Világ 12 could be watched live on RTL+ throughout the duration of the programme, while the programme's television broadcast on Cool was an ismétlés/összefoglaló adás (repeat/summary broadcast) of the material already made available on RTL+. The regulations stated that votes submitted during the Cool transmission were invalid and did not count toward the results.

=== Prize fund ===
The prize fund was variable during the season rather than being a fixed amount throughout the competition. Contestants were given opportunities to spend money from the fund during tasks and auctions, with the amount available to the eventual winner changing as the season progressed.

In July 2024, RTL reported that three contestants had spent a combined HUF 11.55 million from the prize fund during an auction involving photographs, a letter and a video sent by their families. The spending reduced the prize fund by that amount.

At the beginning of the finale, the remaining contestants competed for the amount accumulated after these deductions and other changes during the season. Ádi ultimately won the season and received HUF 37.65 million.

=== Viewer participation ===
==== Voting show (Beszavazó-show) ====
The twelfth season revived the Beszavazó-show, a format in which viewers could determine which of two potential contestants would enter the Villa. RTL described the feature as a return to the programme after it had last been used during the fifth season in 2011.

The Beszavazó-show was introduced after Bogi was evicted following the public vote. Two potential contestants, Jázmin and Ádi, were presented to viewers and competed for the vacant place in the Villa. The audience could vote for which one should become a contestant.

The voting period began after the candidates were introduced during the 10 May programme. The result was announced on 12 May, with Ádi receiving 65% of the votes against Jázmin's 35%. Ádi therefore entered the Villa as a full contestant.

Name	Age	Details	Result	
Ádi (Ádám Farkas)	25	Jázmin's brother	65%	Selected
Jázmin (Jázmin Farkas)	18	Ádi‘s sister	35%	Not selected

==== Villalakó+ prize draw ====
Later in the season, RTL introduced Villalakó+, a separate audience participation mechanism that allowed RTL+ subscribers to apply for the opportunity to become a full contestant. RTL described the initiative as a new way of entering the Villa in the history of Való Világ. It was announced by the host Csilla Megyeri on 17 May.

Applicants had to have an RTL+ subscription and submit an application. RTL selected four candidates by drawing lots, although not all of the initially selected candidates ultimately took part in the process, resulting in additional candidates being selected. Three RTL+ viewers: Ruben, Sanyi and Petya, were subsequently selected as finalists for the process. All three completed the required medical and psychological examinations, after which viewers could determine which of them would enter the Villa during the voting show Beszavazó-show.

The voting show took place after the selection. Ruben won by 55.33% of the audience vote and entered the Villa as a full contestant. He later became the fourth selected contestant of the season and was required to choose a challenger for a Duel.

Name	Details	Result	
Ruben (Ruben Kollár)	RTL+ subscribers	55.33%	Selected
Sanyi	RTL+ subscribers	26.94%	Not selected
Petya	RTL+ subscribers	17.73%	Not selected

== Villa residents ==
Name	Age	Occupation	Residence	Entry date	Exit date	Status
Ádi (Ádám Farkas)	25		Szigetszentmiklós	12 May 2024; Day 8	28 July 2024; Day 85	Winner; Spent 78 days in the villa
Kikidi (Dániel Kékes)	29	Mechanic	Csömör	5 May 2024; Day 1	28 July 2024; Day 85	Runner-up; Spent 85 days in the villa
Geri (Gergő Rajmund Kovács)	21	Football player	Szombathely	5 May 2024; Day 1	28 July 2024; Day 85	Third Place; Spent 85 days in the villa
Giada (Giada Mosti)	22	Hand care and fake nail designer	Sziget, Serbia	5 May 2024; Day 1	26 July 2024; Day 83	Evicted; Spent 83 days in the villa
Reni (Renáta Tóth)	22	Personal trainer	Budapest	5 May 2024; Day 1	24 July 2024; Day 81	Evicted; Spent 81 days in the villa
Dorka (Bettina Dorka Váradi)	22	Solarium receptionist	Diósd	5 May 2024; Day 1	21 July 2024; Day 78	Evicted; Spent 78 days in the villa
Dzsigeri (Gergő Tokaji)	21	Unemployed	Budapest	6 May 2024; Day 2	18 July 2024; Day 75	Disqualified; Spent 74 days in the villa
Dudu (Dávid Bottlik)	23		Budapest	8 May 2024; Day 4	14 July 2024; Day 71	Evicted; Spent 66 days in the villa
Ruben (Ruben Kollár)	21		Szentes	2 June 2024; Day 29	30 June 2024; Day 57	Evicted; Spent 30 days in the villa
Valen (Marcell Valentin Cseh)	21	Jewelry appraiser	Budapest	5 May 2024; Day 1	16 June 2024; Day 43	Evicted; Spent 43 days in the villa
Vera (Veronika Bárány)	25		Mosonmagyaróvár	8 May 2024; Day 4	9 June 2024; Day 36	Evicted; Spent 33 days in the villa
Csaszi (Tibor Szabó)	23	Masseur	Debrecen	15 May 2024; Day 11	8 June 2024; Day 35	Walked; Spent 25 days in the villa
Noémi (Noémi Viktória Papp)	21		Szentendre	7 May 2024; Day 3	26 May 2024; Day 22	Evicted; Spent 20 days in the villa
Gina (Georgina Sütő)	32	Tattoo artist	Berettyóújfalu	5 May 2024; Day 1	17 May 2024; Day 13	Evicted; Spent 13 days in the villa
Bogi (Boglárka Siry)	18	Eyelash stylist	Vecsés	5 May 2024; Day 1	12 May 2024; Day 8	Evicted; Spent 7 days in the villa

== Selections table ==
		Public vote		Pink-black scarf	#1	~~#2~~ Cancelled	#2	#3	#4	#5	#6	#7	#8	Final	
Date		12 May		17 May	19 May	2 June	8 June	10 June	23 June	7 July	15 July	22 July	24 July	28 July	
Date		#1	#2	17 May	19 May	2 June	8 June	10 June	23 June	7 July	15 July	22 July	24 July	28 July	
Ádi		Not in Villa		Passed	Dudu	Csaszi	Dudu	Valen	Dudu	Dorka	Dorka	Reni	Kikidi	Winner (Day 85)	
Kikidi		Passed			Dudu	Csaszi	Vera	Dorka	Dorka	Dorka	Dorka	Reni	Geri	Runner-Up (Day 85)	
Geri		Passed			Dorka	Csaszi	Vera	Valen	Giada	Lissza	Dorka	Giada	Giada	Third Place (Day 85)	
Giada		Passed			Dorka	Dudu	Ádi	Dorka	Geri	Ádi	Dorka	Reni	Geri	Evicted (Day 83)	
Reni		Passed			Dorka	Csaszi	Vera	Valen	Dzsigeri	Ádi	Dzsigeri	Kikidi	Evicted (Day 81)		
Dorka		Passed			Ádi	Dudu	Vera	Ádi	Not eligible	Giada	Ádi	Evicted (Day 78)			
Dzsigeri		Passed			Noémi	Vera	Vera	Giada; Ádi	Ruben; Ruben	Reni	Reni	Disqualified (Day 75)			
Dudu		Danger zone	58%	Passed	Dorka; Dorka	Csaszi	Vera	~~Valen~~	Ruben	Ádi	Evicted (Day 71)				
Ruben		Not in Villa					Ádi	Ádi	Dorka	Evicted (Day 57)					
Valen		Passed		52%	Dudu	Ádi	Ádi; Ádi	Ádi	Evicted (Day 43)						
Vera		Passed			Dudu	Csaszi	Ádi	Evicted (Day 36)							
Csaszi		Not in Villa		Exempt	Dorka	Ádi	Walked (Day 35)								
Noémi		Passed			Dorka	Evicted (Day 22)									
Gina		Passed		48%	Evicted (Day 13)										
Bogi		Danger zone	42%	Evicted (Day 8)											
Note		none			1, 2	3, 4	5	6	7	8	9	10	none		
Immune		none		Csaszi	Csaszi; Vera	Dorka; Vera; Dudu	none	Dudu	Ádi	Dzsigeri	none			none	
Selected		none		none	Dorka	Csaszi	Vera	Ádi	Ruben	Ádi	Dorka	Reni	Geri	none	
Challenged		none		none	22 May	5 June	8 June	12 June	26 June	10 July	17 July	none	25 July	none	
Challenged		none		none	Noémi	Kikidi	Dudu	Valen	Dzsigeri	Dudu	Ádi	none	Giada	none	
Walked		none		none	none	Csaszi	none					none		none	
Disqualified		none		none	none						Dzsigeri	none	none	none	
Duel	Date	none		none	26 May	9 June	9 June	16 June	20 June	14 July	21 July	none	26 July	none	
Duel	Evicted	Bogi; 42% to save		Gina; 48% to save	Noémi; 26.60% to save	Cancelled	Vera; 45.67% to save	Valen; 20.73% to save	Ruben; 72.89% to save	Dudu; 19.11% to save	Dorka; 40.21% to save	Reni; Viewer's choice to evict	Giada; 47.40% to save	Geri; 25.73% to win	Kikidi; 45.13% to win
Duel	Saved	Dudu; 58%		Valen; 52%	Dorka; 73.40%	Cancelled	Dudu; 54.33%	Ádi; 79.27%	Dzsigeri; 50.89%	Ádi; 80.89%	Ádi; 59.79%	none	Geri; 52.60%	Ádi; 43.32% Kikidi; 30.95%	Ádi; 54.87% to win

=== Notes ===
- ^1: Before moving in the Villa, Dudu could choose whether or not to take HUF 1 million worth of the opportunity to place a double sign from the prize fund. Since his choice was yes, the person he named received two marks during the first selection.
- ^2: Before moving in the Villa, Vera could choose whether or not to take the purple scarf, symbolizing protection, worth 1 million forints from the prize fund. Since her choice was yes, she was protected from the first selection, challenge and duel.
- ^3: Before the challenge, Csaszi named Vera and referred to Dudu as the contestant he would challenge. As a result, both contestants were granted immunity during the challenge.
- ^4: Csasi announced his intention to quit on 7 June, 2 days before the duel, which he confirmed after a 24 hour reflection period. Thus, the duel between Csaszi ans Kikidi was cancelled and a new round of selection and challenge was held on June 8.
- ^5: Valen received a golden envelope, which gave him double voting rights.
- ^6: Dudu broke a rule at the end of the duel, so his vote is invalid.
- ^7: Dzigeri won the double voting rights, but so Dorka could not make a mark on the selection.
- ^8: On 10 July, Ádi had to name two people, who were Dudu and Dorka. The next day, the viewers decided who would be challenged and take part in the 5th duel.
- ^9: From the 6th duel, the purple scarf symbolizing protection was removed.
- ^10: The fate of the selected contestant, Reni, was decided by the viewers. The viewers chose whether Reni would participate in a duel or be eliminated immediately, in which case HUF 5 million would be added to the prize fund.
