= Való Világ season 8 =

Való Világ
- Season 8
- Presented by: Anikó Nádai; Bence Istenes
- No. of days: 107
- No. of housemates: 15
- Winner: Soma Farkas
- Runner-up: Vivien Vanicsek
- Companion show: BeleValóVilág

Release
- Original network: RTL II
- Original release: 27 August – 11 December 2016

Season chronology
- ← Previous; Season 7 Next → Season 9

Való Világ 8, also known as Való Világ powered by Big Brother, is the eighth season of the Hungarian reality television series Való Világ aired by RTL II. It is the first season based on the Big Brother license. It started on 27 August 2016.

Bence Istenes and Anikó Nádai as the main hosts, Győző Gáspár and Való Világ 6 winner Aurelio co-host the spin-off show BeleValóvilág powered by Big Brother.

== Villa residents ==
Name	Age	Occupation	Residence	Entry date	Status
Soma (Soma Farkas)	21	Student	Budapest	27 August 2016	Winner; Spent 106 days in the villa
Vivien (Vivien Vanicsek)	22	Unemployed	Budapest	27 August 2016	Runner-Up; Spent 106 days in the villa
Gina (Gina Kuti)	22	Student	Lengyeltóti	9 October 2016	Third Place; Spent 63 days in the villa
Dávid (Dávid Földeák)	25	Logistics Coordinator	Budapest	27 August 2016	10th Evicted; Spent 104 days in the villa
Ati (Attila Torma)	25	Cook	Felsőszentiván	29 August 2016	9th Evicted; Spent 97 days in the villa
Zsolti (Zsolt Osváth)	24	Bartender	Hatvan	31 August 2016	8th Evicted; Spent 88 days in the villa
Mici (Noémi Dudás)	24	Self-employed	Budapest	27 August 2016	7th Evicted; Spent 92 days in the villa
Tivy (Tivadar Deák)	28	Video Producer / Freelancer	Tatabánya	27 August 2016	6th Evicted; Spent 78 days in the villa
Krisztián (Krisztián Baranyai)	26	Group Leader	Budapest	31 August 2016	11th Evicted; Spent 101 days in the villa
Evelin (Evelin Lakatos)	23	Bartender	Budapest	30 August 2016	5th Evicted; Spent 61 days in the villa
Zseraldin (Zseraldin Acsai)	22	Unemployed	Budapest	4 September 2016	4th Evicted; Spent 42 days in the villa
Lóri (Loránd Csodó)	23	Figurant / Call Center Assistant	Budapest	27 August 2016	Walked; Spent 43 days in the villa
Dina (Dina Hornyák)	23	Bartender	Oborín (Abara)	27 August 2016	3rd Evicted; Spent 30 days in the villa
Viki (Viktória Petri)	23	Hostess	Budapest	28 August 2016	2nd Evicted; Spent 14 days in the villa
Zsófi (Zsófia Varga)	21	Student	Budapest	27 August 2016	1st Evicted; Spent 8 days in the villa

== Nominations table ==
– Immune
– Walked
– Evicted

		#0	#1	#2	#3	#4	#5	#6	#7	#8	#9	#10	Final	
Selection date		4 September	4 September	18 September	2 October	9 October	23 October	6 November	20 November	28 November	5 December	-	-	
Soma		1.89%	Mici	Zseraldin	Elevin	Mici	Ati	Mici	Mici	Ati	Krisztián	9.72%	Winner (Day 106)	
Vivien		8.55%	Viki	Tivy	Lóri	Soma	Dávid	Tivy	Mici	Dávid	Dávid	20.62%	Runner-Up (Day 106)	
Gina		Not in House					Evelin	Tivy	Ati	Ati	Dávid	23.55%	Third place (Day 106)	
Krisztián		4.26%	Viki	Mici	Lóri	Tivy	Evelin	Tivy	Zsolti	Soma	Soma	46.11%	Evicted (Day 105)	
Dávid		0.80%	Viki	Dina	Lóri	Mici	Tivy	Tivy	Vivien	Gina	Vivien	Evicted (Day 104)		
Ati		7.74%	Dina	Dina	Zseraldin	Zseraldin	Evelin	Tivy	Gina	Gina	Evicted (Day 99)			
Zsolti		5.92%	Dina	Zseraldin	Mici	Zseraldin	Tivy	Tivy	Mici	Evicted (Day 92)				
Mici		12.13%	Viki	Dávid	Zsolti	Zseraldin	Evelin	Soma	Zsolti	Evicted (Day 92)				
Tivy		5.15%	Viki	Mici	Zseraldin	Krisztián	Zsolti	Gina	Evicted (Day 78)					
Evelin		9.84%	Viki	Dina	Lóri	Ati	Krisztián	Evicted (Day 64)						
Zseraldin		Not in House		Dina	Lóri	Ati	Evicted (Day 50)							
Lóri		3.21%	Viki	Mici	Evelin	Walked (Day 43)								
Dina		17.72%	Ati	Dávid	Evicted (Day 29)									
Viki		2.04%	Lóri	Evicted (Day 15)										
Zsófi		20.75%	Evicted (Day 8)											
Note		none				none						1	none	
Immune		none	Zseraldin	Lóri	Dávid; Evelin	Gina	Mici	Ati; Gina	Krisztián	none		none		
Selected		none	Viki	Dina	Lóri	Zseraldin	Evelin	Tivy	Mici	Ati	Dávid	none		
Challenged		none	Lóri	Dávid	Dávid	Mici	Ati	Krisztián	Zsolti; Dávid	Gina	Vivien	none		
Walked		none			Lóri	none								
Duel	Duel date	-	11 September	25 September	9 October	16 October	30 October	13 November	27 November	4 December	9 December	10 December	11 December	
Duel	Evicted	Zsófi; 20.75% to evict	Viki; 39.94% to save	Dina; 38.25% to save	Duel cancelled ~~Lóri~~; ~~35.65%~~; ~~to save~~	Zseraldin; 43.33% to save	Evelin; 46.98% to save	Tivy; 41.77% to save	Mici; 14.96% to save	Ati; 39.58% to save	Dávid; 47.79% to save	Krisztián; 46.11% to evict	Gina; 21.46% to win	Viven; 37.35% to win
Duel	Evicted	Zsófi; 20.75% to evict	Viki; 39.94% to save	Dina; 38.25% to save	Duel cancelled ~~Lóri~~; ~~35.65%~~; ~~to save~~	Zseraldin; 43.33% to save	Evelin; 46.98% to save	Tivy; 41.77% to save	Zsolti; 45.74% to save	Ati; 39.58% to save	Dávid; 47.79% to save	Krisztián; 46.11% to evict	Gina; 21.46% to win	Viven; 37.35% to win
Duel	Saved	-	Lóri; 60.06%	Dávid; 61.75%	~~Dávid~~; ~~64.35%~~	Mici; 56.67%	Ati; 53.02%	Krisztián; 58.23%	Dávid; 54.26%	Gina; 60.42%	Vivien; 52.21%	-	Soma; 50.14% Vivien; 28.40%	Soma; 62.65% to win

- ^1 : The audience had to vote on who does not want to see in the finale.

== Weekly themes ==
Daddy-mommy week

- Winner

Parents	Baby's gender	Baby's name	Rank
Soma & Ati	Boy	Alessandro	1st
Dina & Lóri	Boy	Olivér	2nd
Evelin & Dávid	Girl	Natasa	2nd
Vivien & Zsolti	Girl	Britti	3rd
Mici & Krisztián	Girl	Mirella	4th
Zseraldin & Tivy	Girl	Málna	The simulation stopped

Hierarchy week

Hierarchy	Name	Title	Sleeping place	Eating place
1st	Zsolti	Main boss	Sufni	House
2nd	Tivy	Bosses	Bedroom	House
3rd	Soma	Bosses	Bedroom	House
4th	Vivien	Bosses	Bedroom	House
5th	Dina	Bosses	Bedroom	House
6th	Lóri	Bosses	Bedroom	House
7th	Evelin	Losers	Living room	Garden
8th	Krisztián	Losers	Living room	Garden
9th	Zseraldin	Losers	Living room	Garden
10th	Dávid	Losers	Living room	Garden
11th	Mici	Losers	Living room	Garden
12th	Ati	Most loser	Living room	Garden

Hotel week

- Employee of the Week

Hotel staff
Name	Occupation
Dávid	Hotel manager
Lóri	Hotel manager deputy
Soma	Receptionist / Bellboy
Ati	Cook
Evelin	Pressure-cooker
Krisztián	Personal trainer
Zseraldin	Massage / Sauna master
Zsolti	Bartender
Tivy	Server
Mici	Chambermaid
Vivien	Chambermaid

Media week

The villa residents were given the task, that they can write a tabloid newspaper Villafirka about what happening in the house. The three editor in chief: Mici, Evelin, and Lóri formed 3 groups and every day other team was edited the newspaper.

Circus week

- The best pair

Name	Role
Tivy & Ati	Clown
Vivien & Zsolti	Aerialist
Soma & Gina	Strongman & his partner
Mici & Krisztián	Animal trainer
Dávid & Zseraldin	Juggler
Evelin	Boss / host

Eco week

This week, the villa residents got the task that they can produce electricity with a bike, because they shut off the electricity and hot water supply.

School week

This week the villa residents got 'School week' where they had lessons from history, grammar and literature, PE, geography and math. In the end of the week each villa resident had exam. The best student was Soma. His prize was a video message from his family.

Media week

This week the villa residents got the task, that they can make the show and give tasks for the other villa residents.

The best pair

Pairs	Order
Mici & Krisztián	1
Gina & Soma	2
Ati & Dávid	3
Vivien & Zsolti	4
