= Topmodell (Hungarian TV series) =

- Show Logo (Season 1)
- Genre: Reality television
- Created by: Tyra Banks
- Presented by: Nóra Ördög (Season 2–present); Panni Epres (Season 1, Finale); Viktória Vámosi (Season 1, Episodes 1–12)
- Country of origin: Hungary

Original release
- Network: TV2 (Season 2–present); Viasat 3 (Season 1)
- Release: October 2, 2006 – present

Topmodell is a Hungarian reality television series that was based on American model Tyra Banks' America's Next Top Model. Hungarian model Viktória Vámosi hosted the first cycle, but left the show near the end of the season due to creative discrepancies with the Hungarian producers. She was replaced by Panni Epres.

In 2024, a second season was renewed under the name Next Top Model Hungary.

== Cycles ==
Cycle	Premiere date	Winner	Runner-up	Other contestants in order of elimination	Number of contestants	International Destinations
1	2 October 2006	Réka Nagy	Anna Rónaszéki	Mónika Nagy, Annamária Fentős, Xénia Matykó, Eszter Iszak, Anita Gombár, Kata Elekes, Angéla Kulcsár, Titanilla Ambrus, Fruzsina Tóth, Judit Lattmann, Valentina Papp	13	Frankfurt; Johannesburg; Cape Town; Maputo
2	17 March 2024	Lili Mészáros	Nikolett Czibolya	Léda Polgári, Laura Korik & Vanessza Kapusi, Anna Alföldy, Naledi Ncube, Lili Keveházi, Kitti Szaniszló, Anastasia Moritz & Panna Baranyi, Cintia Csordás, Gabi Papp & Lili Jávori, Hawa Kouyaté, Vivien Vidéki	16	Los Cristianos; Sankt Leonhard

== Summaries ==
=== Call-out order ===
Order	Episodes													
Order	1	2	3	4	5	6	7	8	10	11	12	13		
1	Valentina	Judit	Anna	Judit	Réka	Réka	Titanilla	Réka	Judit	Réka	Anna	Réka	Réka	Réka
2	Eszter	Titanilla	Kata	Angéla	Judit	Fruzsina	Valentina	Angéla	Anna	Fruzsina	Judit	Valentina	Anna	Anna
3	Mónika	Anita	Réka	Anna	Fruzsina	Angéla	Fruzsina	Judit	Réka	Anna	Réka	Anna	Valentina	
4	Anna	Angéla	Fruzsina	Fruzsina	Anna	Judit	Judit	Titanilla	Fruzsina	Judit	Fruzsina	Judit		
5	Xénia	Kata	Anita	Kata	Anita	Anna	Anna	Anna	Titanilla	Titanilla				
6	Angéla	Réka	Valentina	Réka	Valentina	Titanilla	Angéla	Fruzsina	Angéla					
7	Annamária	Valentina	Xénia	Valentina	Titanilla	Valentina	Réka	Valentina						
8	Kata	Eszter	Titanilla	Eszter	Kata	Kata	Kata							
9	Titanilla	Xénia	Angéla	Anita	Angéla	Anita								
10	Anita	Fruzsina	Eszter	Titanilla	Eszter									
11	Judit	Annamária	Judit	Xénia										
12	Fruzsina	Anna	Annamária											
13	Réka	Mónika												

The contestant was eliminated
The contestant won the competition

- In Episode 9, no contestants were called, and all the contestants continued in the competition
- Although Valentina was eliminated in episode 7, she was brought back in episode 12.
- Panni Epres hosted the finale because Viktória was fired.

=== Photo shoot guide ===
- Episode 2 photo shoot: Promotional pictures
- Episode 3 photo shoot: Body paint with weapons
- Episode 4 photo shoot: Capturing an intimate moment with male models
- Episode 5 photo shoot: Standing out of a crowd
- Episode 6 photo shoot: Posing with diamonds
- Episode 7 photo shoot: Posing on a boat
- Episode 8 photo shoot: Seven deadly sins
- Episode 10 photo shoot: Posing with wild animals
- Episode 11 photo shoot: Supernatural heroines; beauty shots portraying different emotions
- Episode 12 photo shoot: Posing as fashionable mothers with babies

== Judges ==
- Viktoria Vamosi
- Zita Sípos
- Zoltán Herczeg
- Miklós Bémer
