= Való Világ season 9 =

Való Világ
- Season 9
- Presented by: Anikó Nádai; Peti Puskás
- No. of days: 106
- No. of contestants: 14
- Winner: Zsuzsanna Varga
- Runner-up: Hunor Dobos
- Companion show: BeleValóVilág

Release
- Original network: RTL II
- Original release: 4 November 2018 – 17 February 2019

Season chronology
- ← Previous; Season 8 Next → Season 10

Való Világ 9, also known as Való Világ 9 powered by Big Brother, is the ninth season of the Hungarian reality television series Való Világ aired by RTL II. It is the second season based on the Big Brother license.

The show started on 4 November 2018. Anikó Nádai and Peti Puskás as the main hosts. Éva Baukó, who finished third in the Való Világ 4 and Győző Gáspár co-host the spin-off show BeleValóVilág. The show is scheduled for four months and was end in February 2019.

The daily show broadcast on RTL II at 22:00 from Monday to Saturday, 20:00 on Sunday. Followed by the spin-off show BeleValóVilág.

Compared to the previous seasons, it would be an innovation that the contestants able to communicate with the outside world for the first time in the Való Világ history, and they would appear on RTL Klub web site several times.

== Villa residents ==
Name	Age	Occupation	Residence	Entry date	Exit date	Status
Zsuzsu (Zsuzsanna Varga)	23	Waiter	Bük	4 November 2018; Day 1	17 February 2019; Day 106	Winner; Spent 105 days in the villa
Hunor (Hunor Dobos)	26	Fleet leader	Budapest	8 November 2018; Day 5	17 February 2019; Day 106	Runner-up; Spent 101 days in the villa
Greg (Gregor Einwiller)	30	Nurse	Budapest	4 November 2018; Day 1	17 February 2019; Day 106	Third Place; Spent 105 days in the villa
Roli (Roland Nyéki)	29	Courier	Budapest	7 November 2018; Day 4	15 February 2019; Day 104	Evicted; Spent 100 days in the villa
Adri (Adrienn Horváth)	26	Dating consultant	Budapest	4 November 2018; Day 1	10 February 2019; Day 99	Evicted; Spent 98 days in the villa
Reni (Renáta Beslits)	20	Stripper	Budapest	4 November 2018; Day 1	3 February 2019; Day 92	Evicted; Spent 91 days in the villa
Lacika (László Bódi)	28	Baker	Budapest	11 November 2018; Day 8	20 January 2019; Day 78	Evicted; Spent 70 days in the villa
Vivien (Vivien Bétéri)	18	Student	Budapest	11 November 2018; Day 8	6 January 2019; Day 64	Evicted; Spent 56 days in the villa
Era (Erika Kőkúti)	25	Bartender	Budapest	7 November 2018; Day 4	23 December 2018; Day 50	Evicted; Spent 46 days in the villa
Csoki (Christopher Talon)	21	Interpreter	Budapest	4 November 2018; Day 1	22 December 2018; Day 49	Ejected; Spent 48 days in the villa
Krisztián (Krisztián Dobos)	23	Porn actor	Budapest	4 November 2018; Day 1	16 December 2018; Day 43	Evicted; Spent 42 days in the villa
Ginu (Genovéva Keller)	19	Erotic masseuse	Érd	6 November 2018; Day 3	2 December 2018; Day 29	Evicted; Spent 26 days in the villa
Radics (Attila Radics)	25	YouTuber	Budapest	5 November 2018; Day 2	18 November 2018; Day 15	Evicted; Spent 13 days in the villa
Cintike (Cintia Kotrics)	27	Waiter	Győr	4 November 2018; Day 1	11 November 2018; Day 8	Evicted; Spent 7 days in the villa

== Selections table ==
Danger Zone
Immune/Exempt

		#0	#1	#2	#3	#4	#5	#6	#7	#8	#9	Final	
Selection date		-	November 11	November 25	December 9	December 16	December 30	January 13	January 27	February 4	February 11	-	
Zsuzsu		9.8%	Radics	Vivien	Krisztián	Roli	Vivien	Roli	Reni	Not; Eligible	Roli	Winner (Day 106)	
Hunor		20.6%	Radics	Csoki	Krisztián	Lacika	Greg	Adri	Zsuzsu	Adri	Zsuzsu	Runner-up (Day 106)	
Greg		7.5%	Hunor	Csoki	Krisztián	Roli	Vivien	Roli	Roli	Roli	Hunor	Third place (Day 106)	
Roli		10.4%	Reni	Csoki	Krisztián	Reni	Greg	Adri	Zsuzsu	Greg	Zsuzsu	Evicted (Day 104)	
Adri		3.2%	Radics	Ginu	Vivien	Vivien	Vivien	Lacika	Hunor	Roli	Evicted (Day 99)		
Reni		6.1%	Roli	Ginu	Era	Era	Vivien	Roli	Roli	Evicted (Day 92)			
Lacika		Not in Villa	Exempt	Csoki	Krisztián	Hunor	Greg	Adri	Evicted (Day 71)				
Vivien		Not in Villa	Exempt	Csoki	Adri	Zsuzsu	Greg	Evicted (Day 64)					
Era		6.2%	Radics	Csoki	Krisztián	Zsuzsu	Evicted (Day 50)						
Csoki		9.6%	Roli	Ginu	Krisztián	Banned	Ejected (Day 49)						
Krisztián		5.3%	Roli	Csoki	Zsuzsu	Evicted (Day 43)							
Ginu		4.4%	Csoki	Reni	Evicted (Day 29)								
Radics		12.6%	Roli	Evicted (Day 15)									
Cintike		4.3%	Evicted (Day 8)										
Note		none				1, 2	none			3			
Immune		none	Adri; Lacika; Vivien	Era	Csoki	Adri	Roli	Greg	Adri; Greg	Zsuzsu	none	none	
Selected		none	Radics	Csoki	Krisztián	Roli	Greg	Adri	Zsuzsu	Roli	Zsuzsu	none	
Challenged		none	November 14	November 28	December 12	December 19	January 2	January 16	January 30	February 6	February 13	none	
Challenged		none	Era	Ginu	Adri	Era	Vivien	Lacika	Reni	Adri	Roli	none	
Ejected		none				Csoki	none						
Duel	Duel date	November 11	November 18	December 2	December 16	December 23	January 6	January 20	February 3	February 10	February 15	February 17	
Duel	Evicted	Cintike; Roli's choice to evict	Radics; 44.49% to save	Ginu; 31.94% to save	Krisztián; 23.13% to save	Era; 24.15% to save	Vivien; 27.17% to save	Lacika; 37.26% to save	Reni; 32.39% to save	Adri; 43.18% to save	Roli; 39.36% to save	Greg; 13.01% to win	Hunor; 45.69% to win
Duel	Saved	-	Era; 55.51%	Csoki; 68.06%	Adri; 76.87%	Roli; 75.85%	Greg; 73.83%	Adri; 62.74%	Zsuzsu; 67.61%	Roli; 56.82%	Zsuzsu; 60.64%	Zsuzsu; 49.82% Hunor; 37.17%	Zsuzsu; 54.31% to win

- ^1 : Csoki did not participate in several tasks this week, it was against rules. He was not allowed to vote during the selection.
- ^2 : Csoki was ejected from the show for dropped a sharp object to Zsuzsu without any prior warning and threatening.
- ^3 : Roli used his superpower to take away Zsuzsu's right to vote during the selection.

== Villa master ==
Villa Master

	Week 1	Week 2	Week 3	Week 4	Week 5	Week 6	Week 7	Week 8	Week 9	Week 10	Week 11	Week 12	Week 13	Week 14	Week 15	Week 16
Villa Master	Krisztián; Day 2–3															
Villa Master	Radics; Day 3–5															
Villa Master	Roli; Day 5–17															
Villa Master			Krisztián; 17-31													
Villa Master					Vivien; Day 31–38											
Villa Master						Reni; Day 38–44										
Villa Master							Greg; Day 44–52									
Villa Master								Roli; Day 52–59								
Villa Master									Zsuzsu; Day 59–79							
Villa Master												Roli; Day 79–87				
Villa Master													Hunor; Day 87–94			
Villa Master														Greg; Day 94–106		

== Superpower ==
As in season 7, superpowers return to get villa residents a boost.

Superpower	Ability	Owner	
Joker	By using it, the owner can steal any other superpower not used yet.	Era	Used on Day 20
The law of exile	The owner can choose someone to banned from the game for 8 hours. Those who have been exiled must spend 8 hours in the sauna.	~~Reni~~ ↓ Zsuzsu	Used on Day 60
Double sign/ sign receiver	The owner of the superpower has two options, of which he/she chooses which one person to use. The first option is that you can double your vote in Selection. This means that you are not only got one vote but two at the same person. The second option is to seize a vote from someone else. This means that if you use your superpower against someone, then the person will not be able to vote in the next Selection. Of course, the subsequent Selection may again signal the person who took this opportunity.	~~Radics~~ ↓ ~~Vivien~~ ↓ Roli	Used on Day 93
Purple shawl	The owner has a purple cloth with destiny. You can use it for yourself or others.	~~Greg~~ ↓ Era ↓ Greg	Used on Day 85
I am the king	In one thematic week, the owner will automatically get royal rights.	~~Csoki~~ ↓ Lacika	Used on Day 67
Lie detector	The owner's partner can be sent to a spot outside a villa where he/she will be investigated by a lie detector. This superpower can be used three times, but only once between two duels.	Zsuzsu	Used on Day 17^{①}; Day 76^{②}
Duel advice	When the owner is preparing for a duel, he/she can use the power to seek advice from the outside world.	~~Lacika~~ ↓ Roli	Used on Day 34
20,000 Viller	At a point of the game when the official currency of the Viller is introduced into the villa, the owner of the superpower will automatically receive 20,000 Villers.	~~Roli~~ ↓ ~~Lacika~~ ↓ Hunor	Used on Day 81
Mobile phone	The owner of this superpower will have the opportunity to talk to his/her loved one out of the villa for a limited time by a mobile phone. The length of the conversation is determined by Big Brother.	Ginu	Used on Day 16
Protection disposal	The owner can eliminate the protection of himself or of a villa owner on one occasion during the game. By using it, the person who received will lose the protection.	~~Hunor~~ ↓ Roli	Used on Day 95
A date outside the villa	The owner can choose a partner of his/her choice to an outside place once during a game.	Krisztián	Used on Day 15
Prediction	The owner of the superpower can request professional help on one occasion during the game.	Adri	Used on Day 18

== Sympathy vote ==
Like previous seasons, the viewers could vote, which is the most likeable villa resident. In this season, according to the votes of the viewers, the villa resident with the lowest number of votes are in the Danger Zone, from which the Villa Master decides who to leave the villa. The two villa residents with fewest votes were Adri and Cintike. Roli, as the Villa Master, chose Cintike to leave the villa, and Adri was under protection for the upcoming selection and challenge. After Cintike left, two new villa residents moved in, Vivien and Lacika, who also under protection during the upcoming selection and challenge.

Villa Master

Villa resident	Place	Result
Hunor	1	Safe
Radics	2	Safe
Roli	3	Safe
Zsuzsu	4	Safe
Csoki	5	Safe
Greg	6	Safe
Era	7	Safe
Reni	8	Safe
Krisztián	9	Safe
Ginu	10	Safe
Cintike	11	Danger Zone
Adri	12	Danger Zone

== Weekly themes ==
Civilization Week

This week, the villa residents lived on different historical ages. All 3 teams started in prehistoric times, during the tasks they could move up to the Middle Ages, then the winning team could go to modern times. The winner's prize was to read a compilation of the audience's comments.

- Winning tribe

Tribe	Leader	Member	Ranking
Wakanda	Ginu	Adri, Hunor, Lacika	1
Gángulé	Vivien	Csoki, Era, Krisztián	2
Grenizsuli	Reni	Greg, Zsuzsu, Roli	3

School Week

This week, the villa residents had to study poetry, music, Hungarian literature and grammar, geography and mathematics in accordance with high school education and had to participate in physical education and ethics classes.

The villa residents were classified into a normal or catch-up group based on their performance at the beginning of the week and in the mid-week. Roli became the best student of the week, and the most developed students became Csoki and Hunor. Their prize was night outside the villa.

- Winners of the week

	Grade					
	Hungarian	Mathematics	Geography	Sing	Etiquette	Physical education
Adri	3	3	4	4	4	4
Csoki	3	5	4	5	4	5
Era	3	3	4	4	5	4
Greg	3	3	3	4	4	5
Hunor	3	4	4	4	5	5
Krisztián	2	5	4	4	3	4
Lacika	3	2	4	4	3	5
Reni	3	3	3	5	5	5
Roli	4	5	5	4	5	5
Vivien	4	4	4	4	4	5
Zsuzsu	4	3	4	4	5	4

Social Media Days

This week, the villa residents had to fulfil various tasks, which had to be recorded with a camera. Viewers could express their opinions with "like" and "dislike" on social media. Viewers could vote for who performed best during the week. At the end of each day, the audience decided the winner was Csoki. His prize is host BeleValóVilág with Éva Baukó. But later, Csoki was removed from the show. Instead, Zsuzsu, the second place of the week took his prize.

Fitness Week

- Winning couples

Couples	Ranking
Greg & Zsuzsu	1
Roli & Adri	2
Reni & Lacika	3
Hunor & Vivien	4

Hierarchy Week

This week, the villa residents had to behave like they were living in a kingdom. They had to make rules, and they had to complete all the king's or queen's orders. Because "I am the King" is Lacika's superpower, he became the King. The king could choose a chancellor to set up a hierarchy. Every villa residents had to execute the orders of his co-worker. The villa residents were obliged to comply with the rules set in the "Villabulla" during the thematic week. The king was also able to impose penalties on his companions.

Hierarchy	Name	Title	Sleep place
1	Lacika	King	Bedroom
2	Roli	Chancello	Bedroom
3	Hunor	Subject	Living room
4	Greg	Subject	Living room
5	Reni	Subject	Living room
6	Zsuzsu	Subject	Living room
7	Adri	Subject	Living room

Hierarchy	Name	Title	Sleep place
1	Adri	King	Bedroom
2	Reni	Chancellor	Bedroom
3	Greg	Subject	Living room
4	Hunor	Subject	Living room
5	Zsuzsu	Subject	Living room
6	Roli	Subject	Living room
7	Lacika	Subject	Living room

Villér week

- The winner of the week

	Collected Villér
Hunor	73000
Greg	51000
Adri	41000
Zsuzsu	22000
Roli	14000
Reni	5000

NNB Box Week

Like the thematic week in the 5th season, this week, the villa residents clashed with the stars of the Budapest series in a boxing match. The villa residents were all-weekly trained for coaching at the end of the week.

- The villa resident has defeated his opponent

	Opponent
Adri	Bor
Roli	Bécy
Greg	Theodore
Zsuzsu	Tamara
Hunor	Roland
Reni	Szofi

Series week

This week, the villa resident had to shoot a five-part series. The director was different every day.
