= Való Világ season 11 =

Eleventh season of the Hungarian reality show Való Világ

Való Világ
- Season 11
- Presented by: Peti Puskás; Anikó Nádai; Vanda Schumacher
- No. of days: 106
- No. of contestants: 15
- Winner: Kristi (Kriszta Karnics)
- Runner-up: Melina Böszörményi
- Companion show: BeleValóVilág

Release
- Original network: RTL Kettő; RTL+ (Live stream)
- Original release: 20 November 2022 – 5 March 2023

Season chronology
- ← Previous; Season 10 Next → Season 12

Való Világ 11, is the eleventh season of the Hungarian reality television series Való Világ aired by RTL Kettő. It is the fourth season based on the Big Brother license.

The show started on 20 November 2022 and concluded on 5 March 2023. The season was hosted initially by Anikó Nádai and Peti Puskás. Anikó Nádai later left the show and was replaced by Vanda Schumacher from 22 December 2022. Former contestant Mercédesz Balázs, known as Merci, hosts the spin-off show BeleValóVilág.

The season marked the first time in the history of Való Világ that a 24-hour live stream of the villa was made available to viewers. The live stream was launched on RTL+ on 20 November 2022. RTL introduced the service as part of the launch of its RTL+ streaming platform.

The season featured 15 contestants. Kriszta Karnics, known as Kriszti, won the season. She received a prize of 36 million Hungarian forints.

== Format and development ==
The eleventh season of ValóVilág powered by Big Brother was first announced as part of RTL Hungary's 2022 programming plans in November 2021. And was officially announced by RTL on 22 June 2022, when applications for the eleventh season opened. RTL described the programme as one of Hungary's most successful reality shows and announced that the new season would return later in the year. The winner was announced to receive a prize of 36 million Hungarian forints.

On 2 November 2022, RTL announced that the contestants would enter the villa on 20 November 2022. The premiere was scheduled as a Beköltöző Show at 9pm on RTL Kettő, followed by the regular daily episodes and the companion show BeleValóVilág.

The season retained the established format of Való Világ, in which contestants, known as Villa residents, lived together in a villa under continuous observation and competed through Selections, Challenges, public votes and eviction Duels. The outcome of the game was determined in part by viewers' votes, while contestants also participated in challenges that could affect events inside the villa.

The season also introduced a 24-hour live stream of the villa through RTL+, allowing viewers to follow the contestants' activities around the clock in addition to the edited television broadcasts. RTL announced the service shortly before the season premiered.

== Villa residents ==
Name	Age	Occupation	Residence	Entry date	Exit date	Status
Kriszti (Kriszta Karnics)	23	Waiter	Budapest	23 November 2022; Day 4	5 March 2023; Day 106	Winner; Spent 103 days in the villa
Melina (Melina Böszörményi)	29	Tobacconist	Budapest	20 November 2022; Day 1	5 March 2023; Day 106	Runner-up; Spent 106 days in the villa
Rico (Riccardo Dicati)	24	Driver	Bracciano, Italy	21 November 2022; Day 2	5 March 2023; Day 106	Third Place; Spent 105 days in the villa
Reni (Renáta Kreutzer)	27	Waiter	Kalocsa	20 November 2022; Day 1	4 March 2023; Day 105	Evicted; Spent 105 days in the villa
Lissza (Melissa Szabó)	21	Office assistant, Hostess	Budapest	20 November 2022; Day 1	3 March 2023; Day 104	Evicted; Spent 104 days in the villa
Mario (János Márió Deli)	24	Football player	Gyöngyös	26 November 2022; Day 7	25 February 2023; Day 98	Evicted; Spent 92 days in the villa
Ákos (Akos Károly)	24	University student	Budapest	20 November 2022; Day 1	25 February 2023; Day 98	Evicted; Spent 98 days in the villa
Barna (Barna Fenyvesi)	25	Event organizer	Komló	20 November 2022; Day 1	18 February 2023; Day 91	Evicted; Spent 91 days in the villa
Dani (Dániel Dénes)	28	Server	Budapest	26 November 2022; Day 7	4 February 2023; Day 77	Evicted; Spent 71 days in the villa
Sajti (Sajti Sajtos)	31	Chef	Budapest	20 November 2022; Day 1	21 January 2023; Day 63	Evicted; Spent 63 days in the villa
Piros (Piros Varga)	27	Human Resources	Debrecen	22 November 2022; Day 3	7 January 2023; Day 49	Evicted; Spent 47 days in the villa
Bibi (Bibi Szabados)	21	Unemployed	Esztergom	20 November 2022; Day 1	31 December 2022; Day 42	Evicted; Spent 42 days in the villa
Anita (Anita Krakovszki)	28	Bartender	Várpalota	24 November 2022; Day 5	17 December 2022; Day 28	Evicted; Spent 24 days in the villa
Henrik (Henrik Demendi)	23	Life artist	Budapest	22 November 2022; Day 3	3 December 2022; Day 14	Evicted; Spent 12 days in the villa
Lamin (Lamin Mboob)	27	Chef	Győr	20 November 2022; Day 1	26 November 2022; Day 7	Evicted; Spent 7 days in the villa

=== Villa master ===
This season also featured the Villa master, which was held by one contestant at a time during the competition. The position changed hands throughout the season.

Villa master	Duration
Bibi	Day 2–8
Ákos	Day 8–15
Anita	Day 15–28
Sajti	Day 29–37
Barna	Day 37–51
Melina	Day 51–71
Kriszti	Day 71–85
Rico	Day 85–99
Reni	Day 99–105

== Selections table ==
		Public vote	#1	#2	#3	#4	#5	#6	#7	#8		#9	Public vote	Final	
Date		2022					2023								
Date		November 26		December 10	December 22	December 31	January 14	January 28	February 11	February 20		February 27	March 4	March 5	
Kriszti		0.98%	Melina	Reni	Ákos	Piros	Melina	Dani	Melina	Melina		Melina	26.66%	Winner (Day 106)	
Melina		2.05%	Kriszti	Piros	Lissza	Kriszti	Sajti	Márió	Barna	Márió		Kriszti	27.92%	Runner-Up (Day 106)	
Rico		3.84%	Anita	Piros	Ákos	Piros	Sajti	Dani	Lissza	Reni		Reni	26.28%	Third Place (Day 106)	
Reni		3.07%	Kriszti	Piros	Barna	Piros	Sajti	Márió	Barna	Rico		Rico	19.14%	Evicted (Day 105)	
Lissza		3.54%	Rico	Piros	Reni	Piros	Sajti	Melina	Barna	Melina		Rico	Evicted (Day 104)		
Márió		Not in Villa	Exempt	Kriszti	Dani	Piros	Sajti	Melina	Melina	Melina		Evicted (Day 98)			
Ákos		2.13%	Bibi	Piros	Kriszti	Barna	Rico	Rico	Rico	Rico		Evicted (Day 98)			
Barna		0.94%	Melina	Piros	Ákos	Dani	Melina	Dani	Lissza	Evicted (Day 91)					
Dani		Not in Villa	Exempt	Piros	Márió	Barna	Sajti	Márió	Evicted (Day 73)						
Sajti		0.43%	Rico	Piros	Rico	Piros	Márió	Evicted (Day 63)							
Piros		5.42%	Bibi	Reni	Barna	Barna	Evicted (Day 49)								
Bibi		32.70%	Melina	Piros	Ákos	Evicted (Day 42)									
Anita		2.88%	Kriszti	Piros	Evicted (Day 28)										
Henrik		0.72%	Anita	Evicted (Day 14)											
Lamin		41.30%	Evicted (Day 7)												
Note		none	1, 2	3, 4	none		5, 6	7	none		8	9, 10			
Immune		none	Márió; Dani	Melina	Piros	Ákos	Reni; Melina; Kriszti	Barna	Márió	Lissza		none	none		
Selected		none	Melina	Piros	Ákos	Piros	Sajti	Márió	Barna	Melina		Rico	none		
Challenged		none	November 30	December 14	December 28	January 4	January 18	February 1	February 15	February 20	February 22	March 1	none		
Challenged		none	Henrik	Anita	Bibi	Reni	Barna	Dani	Lissza	Márió	Ákos	Lissza	none		
Duel	Date	none	December 3	December 17	December 31	January 7	January 21	February 4	February 18	February 25		March 3	none		
Duel	Date	none	December 3	December 17	December 31	January 7	January 21	February 4	February 18	Round 1	Round 2	March 3	none		
Duel	Evicted	Lamin; 41.30% to evict	Henrik; 31.97% to save	Anita; 30.04% to save	Bibi; 38.90% to save	Piros; 35.30% to save	Sajti; 41.13% to save	Dani; 49.11% to save	Barna; 47.00% to save	Ákos; 28.76% to save	Márió; 44.79% to save	Lissza; 36.07% to save	Reni; 19.14% to save	Rico; 29.29% to win	Melina; 39.86% to win
Duel	Saved	-	Melina; 68.03%	Piros; 69.96%	Ákos; 61.10%	Reni; 64.70%	Barna; 58.85%	Márió; 50.89%	Lissza; 53.00%	Melina; 40.17% Márió; 31.06%	Melina; 55.21%	Rico; 63.93%	-	Kristi; 39.55% Melina; 31.16%	Vivi; 60.14% to win

=== Notes ===
- ^1: Márió and Dani entered the villa as replacement contestants for Lamin, who was evicted in the public vote, just minutes before the first selection. They were therefore immune and could not vote in the selection.
- ^2: Melina and Kriszti both received three votes in the first selection. As villa master, Bibi ultimately gave the green scarf tied around Melina (selected).
- ^3: Melina gave up the purple scarf symbolizing immunity before the second challenge.
- ^4: Piros violated one of the strict rules of Való Világ by naming her intended challenger, Bibi, before the challenge. As a result, she was not allowed to challenge Bibi and had to face another contestant in the duel.
- ^5: Viewers could vote on the reward for Melina and Kriszti, the two winners of Technical School Week. Duel immunity won the vote, granting them immunity for the challenge.
- ^6: Before the challenge, Sajti named every contestants as a potential challenger, which resulted in a penalty. Viewers could vote to determine which contestants he could choose from, and they selected Barna, Dani, and Márió. Sajti could choose only from among these three contestants.
- ^7: In the sixth selection, Márió and Dani both received three votes. As villa master, Melina ultimately had the green scarf tied around Márió (selected).
- ^8: In the eighth duel, three players participate, from which only one could advance. Márió, the selected contestant and Melina's challenger, could decide who would become the third duelist.
- ^9: Beginning with the ninth duel, the purple scarf symbolizing immunity was discontinued.
- ^10: In the final challenge, Rico selected Reni as his challenger. However, Reni used the red scarf (save and replace) and sent Lissza to compete in her place.

== Red scarf ==
The season introduced the piros kendő (red scarf), a one-time game advantage. During the first week, viewers voted to determine which contestant was considered the most entertaining and would receive the scarf. If its holder became the selected or challenged contestant, the red scarf allowed them to send another contestant to the duel in their place. The holder had 24 hours to decide whether to use the advantage and, if so, which contestant to select.

Piros remained the final holder of the red scarf following the subsequent viewer votes. During the fourth duel, Piros was defeated by Reni, and the red scarf consequently passed to Reni. The advantage played a role in the final duel of the season. After Rico selected Reni as his challenger, Reni used the red scarf to transfer the blue scarf to Lissza, making Lissza Rico's challenger instead.

	Public vote				
	#1-2	#3	#4	#5	#6
Bibi	14.21%	7.24%	8.68%	5.38%	5.71%
Ákos	10.89%	13.61%	13.04%	7.72%	6.54%
Lamin	33.53%	16.78%	10.79%	8.06%	7.03%
Lissza	3.04%	4.33%	2.10%	1.17%	1.20%
Reni	5.41%	8.16%	4.33%	2.46%	4.32%
Barna	10.89%	9.44%	7.34%	6.69%	6.36%
Melina	7.06%	10.32%	4.53%	1.83%	2.73%
Sajti	14.98%	24.90%	28.69%	19.28%	17.83%
Rico		5.23%	3.98%	1.91%	2.09%
Piros			6.32%	29.60%	21.80%
Henrik			10.19%	8.93%	8.14%
Kriszti				6.97%	14.26%
Anita					1.98%
Márió					
Dani					

== Reception ==
The season was monitored by the National Media and Infocommunications Authority (NMHH), which published a series of reports examining the programme's content and its online presence. NMHH's monitoring reports recorded the occurrence of potentially harmful content in the edited episodes, including smoking, alcohol consumption, sexuality and profanity.

For the first four weeks of the season, the authority monitored episodes broadcast between 20 November and 18 December 2022. The authority subsequently published a nine-week report covering the period from 20 November 2022 to 22 January 2023. The report also tracked the contestants' presence and mentions across different online platforms.

=== Controversies ===
The season received criticism for several incidents involving the behaviour of contestants and the depiction of conflicts and intimate situations.

In January 2023, Telex.hu reported on criticism surrounding the season, including an incident involving contestant Piros and disputes involving other contestants. The newspaper reported that the programme had increasingly attracted attention for its use of profanity, sexual content and confrontational situations.

In February 2023, the Hungarian Media Council (NMHH) stated that several episodes of the season had violated provisions concerning human dignity and the protection of minors. It also criticised the 24-hour live stream available through RTL+, stating that the continuous presentation of contestants could place them in humiliating or degrading situations. The findings were reported by several Hungarian news organisations, including 24.hu and HVG. The Media Council subsequently reported additional findings concerning broadcasts from 14 and 16 February, citing provisions concerning human dignity, the treatment of vulnerable persons and the protection of minors. The regulator also referred to the 24-hour online broadcast on RTL+.
