= Való Világ season 10 =

Való Világ
- Season 10
- Presented by: Anikó Nádai; Peti Puskás
- No. of days: 106
- No. of contestants: 14
- Winner: Vivien Szilágyi
- Runner-up: Róbert Ollári
- Companion show: BeleValóVilág

Release
- Original network: RTL II
- Original release: 14 November 2020 – 27 February 2021

Season chronology
- ← Previous; Season 9 Next → Season 11

Való Világ 10, also known as Való Világ X powered by Big Brother, is the tenth season of the Hungarian reality television series Való Világ aired by RTL II. It is the third season based on the Big Brother license.

The show started on 14 November 2020. Anikó Nádai and Peti Puskás serve as the main hosts of the show, while Győző Gáspár co-hosts the spin-off show BeleValóVilág.

The daily show is broadcast on RTL II at 10:00 pm from Sunday to Friday and 9:00 pm every Saturday. It is followed by the spin-off show BeleValóVilág at 11:00 pm.

== Villa residents ==
Name	Age	Occupation	Residence	Entry date	Exit date	Status
Vivi (Vivien Szilágyi)	21	Works in family business	Martfű	14 November 2020; Day 1	27 February 2021; Day 106	Winner; Spent 105 days in the villa
Robi (Róbert Ollári)	27	Dancer and bartender	Budapest	21 November 2020; Day 8	27 February 2021; Day 106	Runner-up; Spent 97 days in the villa
Merci (Mercédesz Balázs)	19	Saleswoman	Esztergom	14 November 2020; Day 1	27 February 2021; Day 106	Third Place; Spent 105 days in the villa
Moh (Armand Szlépka)	22	Personal trainer	Budapest	14 November 2020; Day 1	26 February 2021; Day 105	Evicted; Spent 104 days in the villa
Bálint (Bálint Filipánics)	30	Courier	Tapolca	18 November 2020; Day 5	25 February 2021; Day 104	Evicted; Spent 99 days in the villa
Dani (Dániel Kovács)	22	Entrepreneur	Budapest	16 November 2020; Day 3	20 February 2021; Day 99	Evicted; Spent 96 days in the villa
Virág (Virág Ledneczky)	18	Student	Bonyhád	17 November 2020; Day 4	13 February 2021; Day 92	Evicted; Spent 88 days in the villa
Fru (Fruzsina Tímár)	24	Hand care and artificial nail builder	Szeged	16 November 2020; Day 3	30 January 2021; Day 78	Evicted; Spent 75 days in the villa
Renato (Tamás Renátó Bakonyi)	28	Hairdresser	Szombathely	14 November 2020; Day 1	16 January 2021; Day 64	Evicted; Spent 63 days in the villa
Gina (Georgina Fehér)	26	Unemployed	Mátészalka	14 November 2020; Day 1	2 January 2021; Day 50	Evicted; Spent 49 days in the villa
Amanda (Amanda Fazekas)	23	Patient coordinator	Békéscsaba	14 November 2020; Day 1	26 December 2020; Day 43	Evicted; Spent 42 days in the villa
Gábor (Gábor Kazári)	23	Real estate agent	Tapolca	14 November 2020; Day 1	12 December 2020; Day 29	Evicted; Spent 28 days in the villa
Digo (Piancatelli Daniele)	26	CNC machine operator	Pécs	15 November 2020; Day 2	28 November 2020; Day 15	Evicted; Spent 13 days in the villa
Mercédesz (Mercédesz Závaczki)	26	Unemployed	Miskolc	18 November 2020; Day 5	21 November 2020; Day 8	Evicted; Spent 3 days in the villa

== Selections table ==
		#1		#2	#3	#4	#5	#6	#7	#8	#9	#10	Final	
Selection date		2020					2021							
Selection date		November 21		December 5	December 19	December 26	January 9	January 23	February 6	February 15	February 22	February 25	-	
Vivi		2.39%	Bálint	Gábor	Amanda	Gina	Renátó	Fru	Merci	Dani	Moh	Moh	Winner (Day 106)	
Robi		Not in Villa	Exempt	Gina	Amanda	Gina	Renátó	Vivi	Dani	Dani	Bálint	Moh	Runner-Up (Day 106)	
Merci		4.35%	Bálint	Gábor	Amanda	Gina	Renátó	Virág	Virág	Dani	Vivi	Vivi	Third Place (Day 106)	
Moh		6.24%	Fru	Fru	Renátó	Gina	Renátó	Vivi	Dani	Dani	Robi	Vivi	Evicted (Day 105)	
Bálint		1.5%	Amanda	Gábor	Amanda	Gina	Renátó	Vivi	Merci	Merci	Robi	Evicted (Day 104)		
Dani		3.59%	Fru	Gábor	Amanda	Gina	Moh	Moh	Moh	Moh	Evicted (Day 99)			
Virág		24.18%	Fru	Gábor	Amanda	Gina	Merci	Merci	Merci	Evicted (Day 92)				
Fru		1.92%	Vivi	Moh	Moh	Dani	Moh	Vivi	Evicted (Day 78)					
Renátó		5.03%	Bálint; Bálint	Moh	Vivi	Moh	Moh	Evicted (Day 64)						
Gina		13.65%	Bálint	Moh	Vivi	Bálint	Evicted (Day 50)							
Amanda		29.12%	Gábor; Gábor	Moh	Vivi	Evicted (Day 43)								
Gábor		2.42%	Fru	Moh	Evicted (Day 29)									
Digo		4.47%	Vivi	Evicted (Day 15)										
Mercédesz		1.14%	Evicted (Day 8)											
Note		none	1, 2, 3	4, 5	6	none								
Immune		none	Robi; Virág	Bálint; Dani	Bálint; Robi	Merci; Virág; Fru; Renátó	Bálint	none	Vivi	none			none	
Selected		none	Bálint	Gábor	Amanda	Gina	Renátó	Vivi	Merci	Dani	Robi	Vivi	none	
Challenged		none	November 25	December 9	December 23	December 30	January 13	January 27	February 10	February 17	February 24	February 25	none	
Challenged		none	Digo	Bálint	Merci	Bálint	Moh	Fru	Virág	Moh	Bálint	Moh	none	
Duel	Duel date	November 21	November 28	December 12	December 26	January 2	January 15	January 30	February 13	February 20	February 25	February 26	February 27	
Duel	Evicted	Mercédesz; 1.14% to save	Digo; 31.93% to save	Gábor; 22.92% to save	Amanda; 18.51% to save	Gina; 31.84% to save	Renátó; 15.46% to save	Fru; 35.13% to save	Virág; 24.50% to save	Dani; 48.90% to save	Bálint; 49.89% to save	Moh; 28.61% to save	Merci; 30.34% to save	Robi; 48.45% to save
Duel	Saved	-	Bálint; 68.07%	Bálint; 77.08%	Merci; 81.49%	Bálint; 68.16%	Moh; 84.54%	Vivi; 64.87%	Merci; 75.50%	Moh; 51.10%	Robi; 50.11%	Vivi; 71.39%	Vivi; 38.20% Robi; 31.46%	Vivi; 51.55% to win

=== Notes ===
- ^1: Robi moved into the Villa a few minutes before the first selection took place, he received protection.
- ^2: Viewers were able to decide which villa resident they thought was most in need of the purple shawl (protection). Virág received the most votes, she received protection.
- ^3: The winning pair of the first task, Amanda and Renátó, won a double vote in the first selection.
- ^4: On Day 21, the villagers established a hierarchical order among themselves. In the end, Dani came in first, so he got protection.
- ^5: In the second selection, there was a tie, the Villa Master - Merci decided who would get the green shawl (selected), she chose Gábor.
- ^6: Bálint voluntarily gave up the purple shawl (protection), to be challenged by Gábor.
- ^6: Robi became the worker of the week during the Work Week, his reward was a purple shawl (protection).

== Villa master ==
	Duration
Amanda	Day 2 - 9
Gábor	Day 10 - 17
Merci	Day 18 - 23
Vivi	Day 24 - 30
Dani	Day 31 - 37
Bálint	Day 38 - 44
Moh	Day 44 - 51
Robi	Day 51 - 58
Fru	Day 58 – 65
Virág	Day 65 – 72
Vivi	Day 72 – 79
Robi	Day 79 – 86
Bálint	Day 86 – 92
Dani	Day 92 – 98
Vivi	Day 98 – 104
