= Való Világ =

- Logo for the twelfth season
- Also known as: Való Világ powered by Big Brother
- Genre: Reality television
- Presented by: Peti Puskás (9–); Csilla Megyeri (12–); Vanda Schumacher (11); Anikó Nádai (8–11); Bence Istenes (6–8); Lilu (3–7); Balázs Sebestyén (4–5); András Stohl (1–4); Noémi Czifra (1–2)
- Country of origin: Hungary
- No. of series: 12

Original release
- Network: RTL+ (12–); RTL Kettő (6–11); RTL (1–5); Cool TV (12–)
- Release: 11 September 2002 – present

Related
- VyVolení; Big Brother

Való Világ (Hungarian pronunciation: [ˈvɒloː ˈvilaːɡ], lit. Real World) is Hungary's reality show aired by RTL. ValóVilág became the most popular Hungarian reality television program ever. The show was aired in the same time slot as the localized version of Big Brother.

While TV2 recorded the highest number of viewers in 2002, Való Világ 1 had an average of 1.5 million. In 2003, Való Világ 2 was a breakthrough. While it had 1.75 million viewers daily, Big Brother 2 recorded only 800,000 viewers. RTL started the third season, which was an absolute success with 2.06 million viewers daily. The first three seasons were broadcast between 2002 and 2004 but returned in November 2010 for the fourth season after years of hiatus.

In the sixth season, it was transferred to the newly launched channel RTL Kettő. For the seventh season in Autumn 2014, RTL Kettő remained the host.

The show holds the Big Brother license since the eighth season and began using the name Való Világ powered by Big Brother. Beginning with the eleventh season, the name was simplified back to ValóVilág.

== Series details ==
| Season | Launch date | Finale date | Days | Villa residents | Winner | Presenters | Network |
|---|---|---|---|---|---|---|---|
| Való Világ 1 | 11 September 2002 | 22 December 2002 | 102 | 10 | Szabolcs (Szabolcs Mészáros) | András Stohl; Noémi Czifra | RTL Klub |
| Való Világ 2 | 1 January 2003 | 31 May 2003 | 152 | 13 | Laci (László Vitkó) | András Stohl; Noémi Czifra | RTL Klub |
| Való Világ 3 | 28 December 2003 | 4 June 2004 | 160 | 14 | Milo (Milován Gyukin) | András Stohl; Lilu | RTL Klub |
| Való Világ 4 | 20 November 2010 | 8 May 2011 | 165 | 16 | Alekosz (Alekosz Nagy) | András Stohl; Balázs Sebestyén; Lilu | RTL Klub |
| Való Világ 5 | 17 September 2011 | 26 February 2012 | 163 | 16 | Attila (Attila Knapp) | Balázs Sebestyén; Lilu | RTL Klub |
| Való Világ 6 | 12 January 2014 | 11 May 2014 | 120 | 15 | Aurelio (Caversaccio Aurelio Onorato) | Bence Istenes; Lilu | RTL Kettő |
| Való Világ 7 | 16 November 2014 | 1 March 2015 | 105 | 13 | Robin (Dávid Mittly) | Bence Istenes; Lilu | RTL Kettő |
| Való Világ 8 | 27 August 2016 | 11 December 2016 | 107 | 15 | Soma (Soma Farkas) | Bence Istenes; Anikó Nádai | RTL Kettő |
| Való Világ 9 | 4 November 2018 | 17 February 2019 | 106 | 14 | Zsuzsu (Zsuzsanna Varga) | Peti Puskás; Anikó Nádai | RTL Kettő |
| Való Világ 10 | 14 November 2020 | 27 February 2021 | 106 | 14 | Vivi (Vivien Szilágyi) | Peti Puskás; Anikó Nádai | RTL Kettő |
| Való Világ 11 | 20 November 2022 | 5 March 2023 | 106 | 15 | Kriszti (Krisztina Karnics) | Peti Puskás; Anikó Nádai; Vanda Schumacher | RTL Kettő |
| Való Világ 12 | 5 May 2024 | 28 July 2024 | 85 | 15 | Ádi (Farkas Ádám) | Peti Puskás; Csilla Megyeri | RTL+ |

== Casting and choice of the viewing public ==
The contestants who had been succeed in the casting could participate in a Beszavazóshow (Vote-In Show). During a beszavazóshow, the viewing public had to choose from the three wannabe villa residents: who they wanted to participate in the show. The person with the most votes would enter the Villa (house) and became officially a villa resident.

In the sixth season, the beszavazóshow was changed into Beköltözés (The Entering Show). In the beköltözés, the creators-chose person (in the first beköltözés 6 people) enters into the Villa.

== Elimination process ==
- Kiválasztás (Selection): The villa residents have to nominate one fellow villa resident in front of each other, live on RTL Klub. The villa resident with the most votes would face eviction.
- Kihívás (Challenge): The villa resident, who became up for eviction earlier, have to choose a fellow villa resident whom he/she thought he/she would be a perfect partner to against in the eviction process. (In the second and third season the selected villa resident had to choose two villa residents. The viewers had to decide from the two villa residents, which would join the selected one and face eviction with him/her.)
- Párbaj (Duel): The two villa residents visits the studio and there presenter shows them short videos from their life in the house. During the discussing which the presenter has with the two villa residents the public can vote for them via phone calls and text message. At the end of the Duel the results of the public vote is revealed. The villa resident who received more votes can go back to the House and continue the game. The villa resident with the fewest vote had to leave the studio and the game as well.
- Aréna (Arena): In season 5 the Duel winner did not get instant immunity. The villa residents were fighting for immunity facing various challenges in the Arena which was built next to the house.

== Season 1 ==
- Start Date: 11 September 2002
- End Date: 22 December 2002
- Duration: 102 days
- Contestants:
  - The Finalists: Szabolcs (The Winner), Majka (Runner-up) & Oki (3rd)
  - Evicted Contestants: Niki, Hajni, Leslie, Lorenzo, Ági, Nóri & Györgyi

| | Round 1 | Round 2 | Round 3 | Round 4 | Round 5 | Round 6 | Round 7 | Finale |
|---|---|---|---|---|---|---|---|---|
| Szabolcs | Niki | Lorenzo | Duelist | Safe | Safe | Duelist | Duelist | Winner (Spent 87 days in the house) |
| Majka | Hajni | Györgyi | Safe | Duelist | Safe | Safe | Safe | Runner-up (Spent 79 days in the house) |
| Oki | Szabolcs | Györgyi | Safe | Safe | Safe | Safe | Safe | Third Place (Spent 100 days in the house) |
| Györgyi | Niki | Ági | Safe | Safe | Duelist | Safe | Duelist | Evicted (Spent ? days in the house) |
| Nóri | Szabolcs | Hajni | Safe | Safe | Safe | Duelist | Evicted (Spent ? days in the house) | |
| Ági | Szabolcs | Györgyi | Safe | Safe | Duelist | Evicted (Spent ? days in the house) | | |
| Lorenzo | Szabolcs | Oki | Safe | Duelist | Evicted (Spent ? days in the house) | | | |
| Leslie | Hajni | Hajni | Duelist | Evicted (Spent ? days in the house) | | | | |
| Hajni | Leslie | Györgyi | Evicted (Spent 43 days in the house) | | | | | |
| Niki | Szabolcs | Evicted (Spent 22 days in the house) | | | | | | |
| Selected | Szabolcs | Györgyi | Szabolcs | Majka | Györgyi | Szabolcs | Szabolcs | - |
| Challenged | Niki | Hajni | Leslie | Lorenzo | Ági | Nóri | Györgyi | - |
| Duel | Szabolcs (149,385); Niki (61,864) | Györgyi (267,636); Hajni (263,385) | Szabolcs (293,262); Leslie (54,156) | Majka (625,000); Lorenzo (163,472) | Györgyi (263,828); Ági (196,654) | Szabolcs (423,195); Nóri (320,762) | Szabolcs (507,103); Györgyi (229,292) | Oki (221,???); Majka (566,877); Szabolcs (757,907) |
| Evicted | Niki | Hajni | Leslie | Lorenzo | Ági | Nóri | Györgyi | Oki; Majka |

== Season 2 ==
- Start Date: 1 January 2003
- End Date: 31 May 2003
- Duration: 152 days
- Contestants:
  - The Finalists: Laci (The Winner), Anikó (Runner-up) & Péter (3rd)
  - Evicted Contestants: Csöpke, Mónika, Elvis, Kismocsok, Rita, Zsolti, Solya, Béka, Sziszi & Gábor

| | Round 1 | Round 2 | Round 3 | Round 4 | Round 5 | Round 6 | Round 7 | Round 8 | Round 9 | Round 10 | Finale |
|---|---|---|---|---|---|---|---|---|---|---|---|
| Laci | Elvis | Mónika | Gábor | Kismocsok | Rita | Solya | Béka | Gábor | Anikó | Gábor | Winner (Spent 142 days in the house) |
| Anikó | Mónika | Sziszi | Elvis | Sziszi | Péter | Sziszi | Sziszi | Béka | Péter | Péter | Runner-up (Spent 134 days in the house) |
| Péter | Laci | Rita | Anikó | Gábor | Solya | Zsolti | Solya | Anikó | Anikó | Gábor | Third Place (Spent 148 days in the house) |
| Gábor | Kismocsok | Sziszi | Kismocsok | Kismocsok | Sziszi | Sziszi | Sziszi | Béka | Siszi | Laci | Evicted (Spent 145 days in the house) |
| Sziszi | Gábor | Mónika | Anikó | Gábor | Anikó | Anikó | Solya | Anikó | Anikó | Evicted (Spent 142 days in the house) | |
| Béka | Mónika | Elvis | Anikó | Solya | Rita | Zsolti | Laci | Gábor | Evicted (Spent 133 days in the house) | | |
| Solya | Mónika | Sziszi | Zsolti | Béka | Laci | Péter | Laci | Evicted (Spent 107 days in the house) | | | |
| Zsolti | Sziszi | Elvis | Gábor | Solya | Laci | Péter | Evicted (Spent 94 days in the house) | | | | |
| Rita | Laci | Mónika | Péter | Laci | Laci | Evicted (Spent 73 days in the house) | | | | | |
| Kismocsok | Gábor | Gábor | Gábor | Gábor | Evicted (Spent 72 days in the house) | | | | | | |
| Elvis | Laci | Anikó | Péter | Evicted (Spent 53 days in the house) | | | | | | | |
| Mónika | Laci | Sziszi | Evicted (Spent 34 days in the house) | | | | | | | | |
| Csöpke | Laci | Evicted (Spent 30 days in the house) | | | | | | | | | |
| Selected | Laci | Sziszi | Anikó | Gábor | Laci | Péter | Sziszi | Anikó | Anikó | Gábor | - |
| Challenged | Csöpke; Elvis | Gábor; Mónika | Béka; Elvis | Kismocsok; Péter | Rita; Zsolti | Solya; Zsolti | Solya; Gábor | Béka; Laci | Sziszi; Péter | Péter; Laci | - |
| Duel | Laci (144,126) (66.59%); Csöpke (72,296) (33.41%) | Sziszi (94,722) (62.02%); Mónika (58,013) (37.98%) | Anikó (175,717) (53.27%); Elvis (154,167) (46.73%) | Gábor (357,846) (81.31%); Kismocsok (82,267) (18.69%) | Laci (269,805) (78.06%); Rita (75,819) (21.94%) | Péter (227,292) (69.50%); Zsolti (99,736) (30.50%) | Sziszi (182,165) (51.93%); Solya (168,641) (48.07%) | Anikó (199,448) (78.55%); Béka (54,451) (21.45%) | Anikó (273,938) (53.06%); Sziszi (242,357) (46.94%) | Gábor (344,481) (49.12%); Péter (356,775) (50.88%) | Péter (249,878) (15.18%); Anikó (691,489) (42%); Laci (704,901) (42.82%) |
| Evicted | Csöpke | Mónika | Elvis | Kismocsok | Rita | Zsolti | Solya | Béka | Sziszi | Gábor | Péter; Anikó |

== Season 3 ==
- Start Date: 28 December 2003
- End Date: 4 June 2004
- Duration: 160 days
- Contestants:
  - The Finalists: Milo (The Winner), Leo (Runner-up) & Katka (3rd)
  - Evicted Contestants: Segal, Pandora, Szilvi, Jenny, Indián, Frenki, Tommyboy, Ágica, Marcsi, Anett & Csaba

| | 1. | 2. | 3. | 4. | 5. | 6. | 7. | 8. | 9. | 10. | 11. | Finale |
|---|---|---|---|---|---|---|---|---|---|---|---|---|
| Milo | Anett | Indián | Anett | Frenki | Tommyboy | Tommyboy | Anett | Anett | Anett | Anett | Leo | Winner (Spent 150 days in the house) |
| Leo | Pandora | Pandora | Szilvi | Indián | Indián | Frenki | Marcsi | Marcsi | Marcsi | Milo | Milo | Runner-up (Spent 159 days in the house) |
| Katka | Segal | Pandora | Tommyboy | Frenki | Ágica | Csaba | Ágica | Ágica | Csaba | Csaba | Csaba | Third Place (Spent 151 days in the house) |
| Csaba | Pandora | Pandora | Szilvi | Jenny | Frenki | Marcsi | Marcsi | Marcsi | Marcsi | Katka | Katka | Evicted (Spent 148 days in the house) |
| Anett | Csaba | Ágica | Katka | Katka | Katka | Milo | Milo | Katka | Milo | Milo | Evicted (Spent 130 days in the house) | |
| Marcsi | Indián | Csaba | Tommyboy | Tommyboy | Tommyboy | Tommyboy | Leo | Leo | Leo | Evicted (Spent 135 days in the house) | | |
| Ágica | Anett | Anett | Jenny | Jenny | Katka | Katka | Katka | Katka | Evicted (Spent 132 days in the house) | | | |
| Tommyboy | Segal | Szilvi | Szilvi | Marcsi | Frenki | Katka | Milo | Evicted (Spent 121 days in the house) | | | | |
| Frenki | Szilvi | Tommyboy | Leo | Milo | Leo | Tommyboy | Evicted (Spent 107 days in the house) | | | | | |
| Indián | Leo | Pandora | Marcsi | Jenny | Leo | Evicted (Spent 77 days in the house) | | | | | | |
| Jenny | Indián | Pandora | Szilvi | Ágica | Evicted (Spent 58 days in the house) | | | | | | | |
| Szilvi | Segal | Csaba | Csaba | Evicted (Spent 65 days in the house) | | | | | | | | |
| Pandora | Segal | Leo | Evicted (Spent 51 days in the house) | | | | | | | | | |
| Segal | Szilvi | Evicted (Spent 37 days in the house) | | | | | | | | | | |
| Selected | Segal | Pandora | Szilvi | Jenny | Leo | Tommyboy | Milo | Katka | Marcsi | Milo | Leo | - |
| Challenged | Katka; Milo | Indián; Jenny | Csaba; Jenny | Marcsi; Indián | Indián; Frenki | Frenki; Katka | Tommyboy; Anett | Ágica; Marcsi | Anett; Csaba | Anett; Leo | Csaba; Milo | - |
| Duel | Segal (74775); Katka (174445) | Pandora (51836); Indián (270711) | Szilvi (47330); Csaba (212067) | Jenny (72400); Marcsi (84005) | Leo (206719); Indián (85358) | Tommyboy (78906); Frenki (56044) | Milo (59850); Tommyboy (32243) | Katka (130431); Ágica (109372) | Marcsi (46492); Anett (72964) | Milo (88643); Anett (42927) | Leo (171051); Csaba (165360) | Katka (213270); Leo (425228); Milo (492069) |
| Evicted | Segal | Pandora | Szilvi | Jenny | Indián | Frenki | Tommyboy | Ágica | Marcsi | Anett | Csaba | Katka; Leo |

== Season 4 ==
- Start Date: 20 November 2010
- End Date: 8 May 2011
- Duration: 165 days

| | 1. | 2. | 3. | 4. | 5. | 6. | 7. | 8. | 9. | 10. | Finale |
| | 2010 | | 2011 | | | | | | | | |
| | 15 December | 27 December | 5 January | 19 January | 5 February | 19 February | 5 March | 26 March | 10 April | 24 April | 8 May |
|---|---|---|---|---|---|---|---|---|---|---|---|
| Alekosz | Anikó | Anikó | Zsófi | Gigi | Olivér | Gigi | Béci | László | Béci | Anikó | Winner (Spent 165 days in the house) |
| Jerzy | Gina | Zsófi | Anikó | Anikó | Gombi | Gombi | Szandika | Éva | Anikó | Éva | Runner-up (Spent 152 days in the house) |
| Éva | Olivér | László | Ildi | Gigi | Olivér | Jerzy | Jerzy | Jerzy | Béci | Anikó | Third Place (Spent 165 days in the house) |
| Anikó | Alekosz | Alekosz | Jerzy | Jerzy | Gombi | Jerzy | Éva | Gigi | Jerzy | Alekosz | Evicted (Spent 154 days in the house) |
| Béci | Éva | Ildi | Éva | Alekosz | Anikó | Gombi | Szandika | Éva | Alekosz | Evicted (Spent 144 days in the house) | |
| László | Éva | Olivér | Éva | Alekosz | Olivér | Gombi | Szandika | Alekosz | Gave up (Spent 133 days in the house) | | |
| Gigi | Zsuzsi | Ildi | Éva | Alekosz | Anikó | Gombi | Anikó | Éva | Evicted (Spent 130 days in the house) | | |
| Szandika | Gombi | Ildi | Ildi | Gigi | Olivér | Gombi | Gigi | Evicted (Spent 102 days in the house) | | | |
| Gombi | Éva | Jerzy | Jerzy | Jerzy | Jerzy | Alekosz | Evicted (Spent 82 days in the house) | | | | |
| Olivér | Zsófi | Zsófi | Ildi | László | Béci | Evicted (Spent 80 days in the house) | | | | | |
| Zsófi | Alekosz | Olivér | Alekosz | Alekosz | Evicted (Spent 65 days in the house) | | | | | | |
| Ildi | Not in House | Szandika | Gombi | Evicted (Spent 23 days in the house) | | | | | | | |
| Gina | Éva | Olivér | Gave up (Spent 23 days in the house) | | | | | | | | |
| Kristóf | Éva | Olivér | Evicted (Spent 21 days in the house) | | | | | | | | |
| Leonidasz | Éva | Evicted (Spent 19 days in the house) | | | | | | | | | |
| Zsuzsi | Alekosz | Disqualified (Spent 12 days in the house) | | | | | | | | | |
| Selected | Éva | Olivér | Ildi | Alekosz | Olivér | Gombi | Szandika | Éva | Béci | Anikó | – |
| Challenged | Leonidasz | Kristóf | Éva | Zsófi | Béci | Alekosz | Béci | Gigi | Jerzy | Éva | – |
| Duel | Éva (72%); Leonidasz (28%) | Olivér (54%); Kristóf (46%) | Ildi (38%); Éva (62%) | Alekosz (71%); Zsófi (29%) | Olivér (39%); Béci (61%) | Gombi (29%); Alekosz (71%) | Szandika (40%); Béci (60%) | Éva (51%); Gigi (49%) | Béci (46%); Jerzy (54%) | Anikó (49%); Éva (51%) | Éva (22%); Jerzy (44%); Alekosz (56%) |
| Evicted | Leonidasz | Kristóf | Ildi | Zsófi | Olivér | Gombi | Szandika | Gigi | Béci | Anikó | Éva; Jerzy |

== Season 5 ==
- Start Date: 17 September 2011
- End Date: 26 February 2012
- Duration: 163 days

– Immunity

| | 0. | 1. | 2. | 3. | 4. | 5. | 6. | 7. | 8. | 9. | 10. | 11. | Finale |
| | 2011 | | | | | | | 2012 | | | | | |
| | 6 October | 16 October | 30 October | 13 November | 27 November | 11 December | 23 December | 8 January | 22 January | 5 February | 15 February | 21 February | 26 February |
|---|---|---|---|---|---|---|---|---|---|---|---|---|---|
| Attila | 4. | Csaba | Eszter | Eszter | Annamária | Csaba | Vera | Fecó | Eszter | Fecó | Vera | Fecó | Winner (Spent 163 days in the house) |
| Csaba | Immune | Vera | Eszter | Eszter | Attila | Eszter | Attila | Eszter | Eszter | Seherezádé | Attila | Seherezádé | Runner-up (Spent 153 days in the house) |
| Seherezádé | 10. | Csaba | Attila | Kinga | Kinga | Csaba | Attila | Kinga | Kinga | Kinga | Attila | Fecó | Third Place (Spent 163 days in the house) |
| Fecó | 1. | Péter | Péter | Eszter | Veronika | Veronika | Péter | Seherezádé | Eszter | Seherezádé | Seherezádé | Attila | Evicted (Spent 160 days in the house) |
| Vera | Immune | Csaba | Eszter | Veronika | Veronika | Csaba | Attila | Attila | Attila | Kinga | Attila | Evicted (Spent 146 days in the house) | |
| Kinga | 6. | Csaba | Eszter | Veronika | Seherezádé | Veronika | Vera | Eszter | Seherezádé | Seherezádé | Evicted (Spent 148 days in the house) | | |
| Eszter | Not in House | Csaba | Shadi | Shadi | Vera | Csaba | Vera | Kinga | Attila | Evicted (Spent 115 days in the house) | | | |
| Péter | 5. | Csaba | Fecó | Eszter | Annamária | Fecó | Vera | Kinga | Evicted (Spent 114 days in the house) | | | | |
| Gergő | 3. | Csaba | Eszter | Eszter | Vera | Csaba | Attila | Evicted (Spent 106 days in the house) | | | | | |
| Veronika | 7. | Csaba | Eszter | Kinga | Vera | Fecó | Evicted (Spent 93 days in the house) | | | | | | |
| Annamária | 9. | Attila | Attila | Shadi | Attila | Evicted (Spent 77 days in the house) | | | | | | | |
| Shadi | Not in House | Attila | Eszter | Eszter | Evicted (Spent 45 days in the house) | | | | | | | | |
| Dya | 2. | Veronika | Vera | Evicted (Spent 47 days in the house) | | | | | | | | | |
| Cristofel | 8. | Csaba | Evicted (Spent 32 days in the house) | | | | | | | | | | |
| Melinda | 11. | Evicted (Spent 14 days in the House) | | | | | | | | | | | |
| Bandi | 12. | Evicted (Spent 11 days in the House) | | | | | | | | | | | |
| Selected | | Csaba | Eszter | Eszter | Vera | Csaba | Vera | Kinga | Eszter | Seherezádé | Attila | Fecó | – |
| Challenged | | Cristofel | Dya | Shadi | Annamária | Veronika | Gergő | Péter | Vera | Kinga | Vera | Attila | – |
| Duel | | 23 October | 6 November | 20 November | 4 December | 19 December | 1 January | 15 January | 29 January | 12 February | 19 February | 24 February | 26 February |
| Duel | | Csaba (59%); Cristofel (41%) | Eszter (75%); Dya (25%) | Eszter (79%); Shadi (21%) | Vera (56%); Annamária (44%) | Csaba (82%); Veronika (18%) | Vera (67%); Gergő (33%) | Kinga (58%); Péter (42%) | Eszter (49%); Vera (51%) | Seherezádé (66%); Kinga (34%) | Attila (76%); Vera (24%) | Fecó (23%); Attila (77%) | Seherezádé (11%); Csaba (32%); Attila (68%) |
| Evicted | Bandi; Melinda | Cristofel | Dya | Shadi | Annamária | Veronika | Gergő | Péter | Eszter | Kinga | Vera | Fecó | Seherezádé; Csaba |

== Season 6 ==
- Start Date: 12 January 2014
- End Date: 11 May 2014
- Duration: 120 days

| | 0. | 1. | 2. | 3. | 4. | 5. | 6. | 7. | 8. | 9. | Finale |
| | 22 January | 26 January | 9 February | 23 February | 9 March | 23 March | 7 April | 21 April | 30 April | 6 May | 11 May |
|---|---|---|---|---|---|---|---|---|---|---|---|
| Aurelio | 2. | Simon | Dávid | Iza | Ádám | Iza | Krisztián | Zsófi | Krisztián | Iza | Winner (Spent 120 days in the house) |
| Zsófi | Not in House | Charlotte | Teo | Aurelio | Aurelio | Charlotte | Teo | Teo | Aurelio | Iza | Runner-up (Spent 111 days in the house) |
| Viki | 5. | Teo | Józsi | Charlotte | Teo | Iza | Teo | Teo | Iza | Iza | Third Place (Spent 116 days in the house) |
| Iza | 6. | Zsolt | Aurelio | Charlotte | Zsolt | Charlotte | Zsolt | Teo | Aurelio | Zsófi | Evicted (Spent 119 days in the house) |
| Krisztián | Not in House | Laci | Dávid | Charlotte | Ádám | Teo | Zsolt | Teo | Iza | Evicted (Spent 103 days in the house) | |
| Teo | 10. | Zsófi | Dávid | Zsófi | Krisztián | Zsófi | Krisztián | Zsófi | Evicted (Spent 102 days in the house) | | |
| Zsolt | 3. | Teo | Charlotte | Iza | Ádám | Iza | Krisztián | Evicted (Spent 92 days in the house) | | | |
| Charlotte | 9. | Zsófi | Dávid | Krisztián | Aurelio | Iza | Evicted (Spent 78 days in the house) | | | | |
| Ádám | Not in House | | | | Krisztián | Evicted (Spent 20 days in the house) | | | | | |
| Dorka | 4. | Laci | Dávid | Charlotte | Evicted (Spent 48 days in the house) | | | | | | |
| Józsi | 7. | Iza | Dávid | Gave up (Spent 40 days in the house) | | | | | | | |
| Dávid | Not in House | | Viki | Evicted (Spent 14 days in the house) | | | | | | | |
| Laci | 8. | Krisztián | Evicted (Spent 19 days in the house) | | | | | | | | |
| Simon | 1. | Aurelio | Disqualified (Spent 18 days in the house) | | | | | | | | |
| Alexa | 11. | Evicted (Spent 10 days in the House) | | | | | | | | | |
| Selected | | Laci | Dávid | Charlotte | Ádám | Iza | Krisztián | Teo | Aurelio | Iza | – |
| Challenged | | Krisztián | Viki | Dorka | Aurelio | Charlotte | Zsolt | Zsófi | Krisztián | Zsófi | – |
| Duel | | 2 February | 16 February | 2 March | 16 March | 30 March | 13 April | 27 April | 4 May | 10 May | 11 May |
| Duel | | Laci (48.32%); Krisztián (51.68%) | Dávid (43.05%); Viki (56.95%) | Charlotte (58.45%); Dorka (41.55%) | Ádám (20.79%); Aurelio (79.21%) | Iza (66.56%); Charlotte (33.44%) | Krisztián (60.62%); Zsolt (39.38%) | Teo (24.59%); Zsófi (75.41%) | Aurelio (53.66%); Krisztián (46.34%) | Iza (42.37%); Zsófi (57.63%) | Viki (27.01%); Zsófi (49.75%); Aurelio (50.25%) |
| Evicted | Alexa | Laci | Dávid | Dorka | Ádám | Charlotte | Zsolt | Teo | Krisztián | Iza | Viki; Zsófi |

== Season 7 ==
- Start Date: 16 November 2014
- End Date: 1 March 2015
- Duration: 105 days

– Not allowed to vote. Guardian voted instead.
– The challenged person was chosen before the selection by the show because of a punishment.
– Dori's vote counted as a double-vote.

| | 0. | 1. | 2. | 3. | 4. | 5. | 6. | 7. | 8. | Finale |
| | 2014 | | | | 2015 | | | | | |
| | 26 November | 30 November | 14 December | 28 December | 11 January | 26 January | 8 February | 17 February | 24 February | 1 March |
|---|---|---|---|---|---|---|---|---|---|---|
| Robin | Not in House | Fanni | Reni | Edina | Zsuzsa | Edina | Laci | Laci | Laci | Winner (Spent 99 days in the House) |
| Dennis | 5. | Zsuzsa | Laci | Robin | Dani | none | Laci | Laci | Dori | Runner-up (Spent 105 days in the House) |
| Dóri | 2. | Laci | Laci | Robin | Edina | Edina | Laci | Fanni | Dennis (x2) | Third place (Spent 105 days in the House) |
| Laci | 6. | Zsuzsa | Reni | Ádam | Zsuzsa | Dennis | Fanni | Fanni | Dori | Evicted (Spent 104 days in the House) |
| Fanni | 1. | Zsuzsa | Laci | Robin | Dani | Dani | Laci | Laci | Evicted (Spent 98 days in the House) | |
| Edina | 7. | Zsuzsa | Reni | Ádam | Zsuzsa | Dennis; Robin | Fanni | Evicted (Spent 90 days in the House) | | |
| Dani | 4. | Reni | Reni | Ádam | Zsuzsa | Dennis | Evicted (Spent 77 days in the House) | | | |
| Zsuzsa | 8. | Reni | Reni | Maci | Edina | Evicted (Spent 58 days in the House) | | | | |
| Maci | 3. | Zsuzsa | Dani | Robin | Zsuzsa | Evacuated (Spent 54 days in the house) | | | | |
| Ádám | 9. | Zsuzsa | Reni | Fanni | Evicted (Spent 44 days in the House) | | | | | |
| Reni | 10. | Zsuzsa | Dani | Evicted (Spent 35 days in the House) | | | | | | |
| Vikcsu | 11. | Zsuzsa | Evicted (Spent 21 days in the House) | | | | | | | |
| Dávid | 12. | Evicted (Spent 6 days in the House) | | | | | | | | |
| Selected | | Zsuzsa | Reni | Robin | Zsuzsa | Dennis | Laci | Laci | Dennis | - |
| Challenged | | Vikcsu | Dani | Ádám | Laci | Dani | Edina | Fanni | Laci | - |
| Duel | | 7 December | 22 December | 4 January | 18 January | 1 February | 15 February | 22 February | 28 February | 1 March |
| Duel | | Zsuzsa (72.66%); Vikcsu (27.34%) | Reni (26.88%); Dani (73.12%) | Robin (64.22%); Ádám (35.78%) | Zsuzsa (49.94%); Laci (50.06%) | Dennis (55.49%); Dani (44.51%) | Laci (53.41%); Edina (46.59%) | Laci (55.38%); Fanni (45.62%) | Dennis (54.40%); Laci (45.60%) | Dóri (13.92%); Dennis (48.90%); Robin (51.10%) |
| Evicted | Dávid | Vikcsu | Reni | Ádám | Zsuzsa | Dani | Edina | Fanni | Laci | Dóri; Dennis |

== Season 8 ==
Való Világ powered by Big Brother

== Season 9 ==
Való Világ 9 powered by Big Brother

== Season 10 ==
Való Világ X powered by Big Brother
