= Enikő Sütő =

Hungarian model, mannequin, public personality

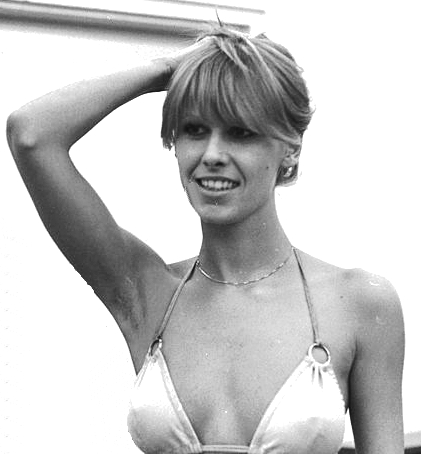
- Sütő in 1977
- Born: 27 July 1958 (age 68); Budapest, Hungary
- Occupations: Media personality; model
- Years active: 1974–present

Enikő Sütő (born 27 July 1958) is a Hungarian media personality, and fashion industry figure. She gained prominence in the 1970s and became one of Hungary's most recognized models.

== Early life and career ==
Enikő Sütő was born on 27 July 1958 in Budapest, Hungary. She rose to fame in 1974 when photographer János Fenyő captured her for a Fabulon poster campaign. This advertisement brought her widespread recognition, leading to her being named "Mannequin of the Year" in 1979.

== Modeling career ==
During the late 1970s and 1980s, Sütő became a leading figure in the Hungarian fashion industry. She worked with numerous brands and appeared in fashion magazines, television programs, and runway shows. Her career flourished despite Hungary's socialist regime, which limited international exposure for local models.

== Later career and public presence ==
Following her peak modeling years, Sütő remained active in the public sphere. She has been involved in discussions on fashion, beauty standards, and aging. She also participated in various media appearances and public engagements, maintaining her influence in the industry.

== Legacy ==
Enikő Sütő is considered one of Hungary’s most iconic models. Her work has left a lasting impact on Hungarian fashion and media, and she continues to be recognized for her contributions to the industry.
