= Péter Ungár =

Hungarian entrepreneur, politician and geographer

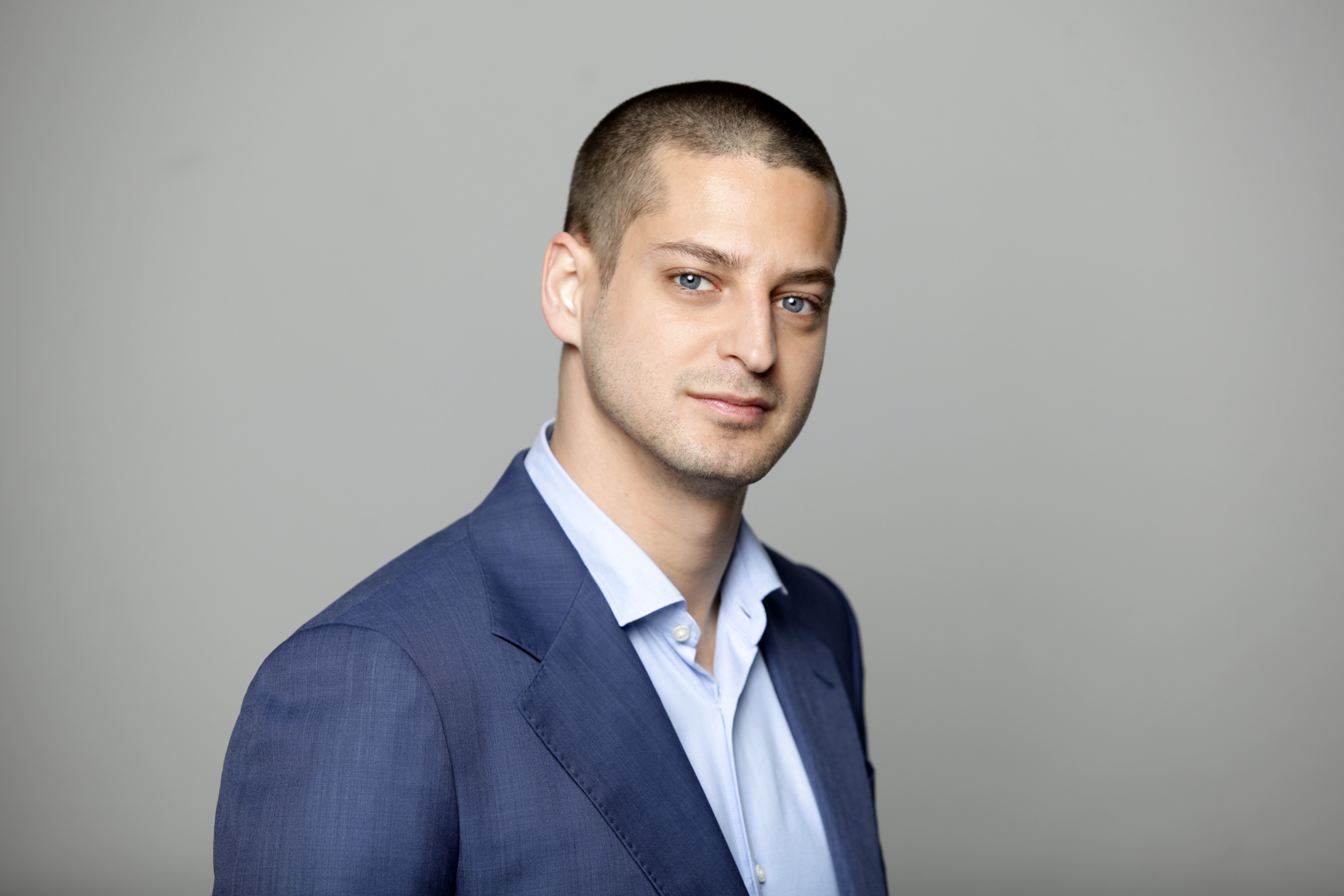

Leader of LMP – Hungary's Green Party
- Incumbent
- Assumed office 27 August 2022 Serving with Erzsébet Schmuck
- Preceded by: Máté Kanász-Nagy

Member of the National Assembly
- In office 8 May 2018 – 8 May 2026

Personal details
- Born: Péter Károly Ungár; 10 June 1991 (age 35) Budapest, Hungary
- Party: LMP (since 2013)
- Parent: Mária Schmidt (mother)
- Relatives: Klára Ungár (aunt)
- Education: University of Edinburgh; University of Cantabria; Central European University
- Occupation: Geographer • Politician

Péter Károly Ungár (born 10 June 1991) is a Hungarian entrepreneur, politician and geographer, who was a Member of the National Assembly of Hungary from the LMP party's national list from 8 May 2018 to 8 May 2026. He has been male co-chair of the party since August 2022.

== Personal life ==
His father András Ungár was a sociologist, his mother Mária Schmidt is a historian who is the director of the House of Terror Museum in Budapest. He is Jewish on his father's side, while he is of Transylvanian Saxon descent through his maternal grandfather.

His older sister is Anna Ungár and his aunt Klára Ungár were Fidesz and then SZDSZ member of parliament.

Ungár came out as gay in April 2019.

== Academia ==
Between 2005 and 2009, he studied at the Toldy Ferenc Gymnasium. Between 2009 and 2013, he studied geography at the University of Edinburgh, before studying geography and urban planning in Spanish at the University of Cantabria. He also studied for a time at the Central European University.

== Politics ==
Becoming an activist for the LMP in 2010, Ungár later joined the party in 2013, where he became the party's international secretary.

The 2014 Hungarian local elections saw Ungár receive 291 votes in the 2nd District of Budapest, failing to become the individual constituency's representative. However, Ungár was elected as a local government representative through the compensation list.

In the 2018 Hungarian parliamentary election, Ungár ran as a candidate for the LMP in Budapest's fourth constituency, as well as fifth in LMP's national list. Managing to receive 10.1% of votes cast in the constituency, Ungár failed to get a constituency seat; instead winning a seat through the national list. Entering into the National Assembly on 8 May 2018, he was the Baby of the House for the 2018–22 parliament, as well as the first member of parliament to be born after the End of Socialism in Hungary.

Later, following the fiasco of the 2019 European Parliament elections, he agreed with András Schiffer, a founding member and former co-chair of LMP, that LMP's story was over and that they deserved to lose. At the same time, he was confident that a new story could begin.

Ungár was the only opposition politician to take up the opportunity to debate with politicians from the governing parties at the Bálványos Free Summer University and Student Camp (more commonly known as Tusványos) in 2019.

Ungár is standing in the 2021 Hungarian opposition primary election in Szombathely in the Vas County 1 parliamentary constituency.

Ungár was elected male co-chair of the LMP – Hungary's Green Party in August 2022.

== Media portfolio ==
In 2016, Ungár started to build a media portfolio, his first independent news portal was Reflektor, run through the Fényszóró Média Alapítvány.

In 2018, he conducted serious, but ultimately unsuccessful, negotiations with Lajos Simicska on the acquisition of Magyar Nemzet, Lánchíd Rádió and Heti Válasz. Later the same year, his 90 percent stake in Azonnali Média Kft. made him majority owner of the national news portal Azonnali.hu. He also started to build up his rural media network, acquiring egerugyek.hu in Eger, 9970.hu in Szentgotthárd, ugytudjuk.hu in Szombathely, and kpsvr.hu in Kaposvár.

== Finances ==
According to the tax returns of 2018, Ungár had assets of 15 billion HUF (€41 million), which consisted of family businesses and property rights to magazines. He owned 17 percent of the joint venture Pió-21 Kft with his brother and mother, with his family also owning 90 percent of shares in Budapesti Ingatlan Nyrt, with Ungár himself owning three percent.

Forbes ranked his family fourth in the 2020 list of the largest Hungarian family companies.

Honorary titles
Preceded by Dóra Dúró	Youngest sitting Member of Parliament; 2018–2022	Succeeded by Miklós Hajnal
National Assembly of Hungary
Preceded by László Lóránt Keresztes	Leader of the LMP parliamentary group 2022–2025	Succeeded by position abolished
Party political offices
Preceded by Máté Kanász-Nagy; Erzsébet Schmuck	Co-President of the LMP – Hungary's Green Party alongside Erzsébet Schmuck (2022–2024); Katalin Szabó-Kellner (2024– ) 2022–	Incumbent
