= Henrik Havas =

Hungarian journalist

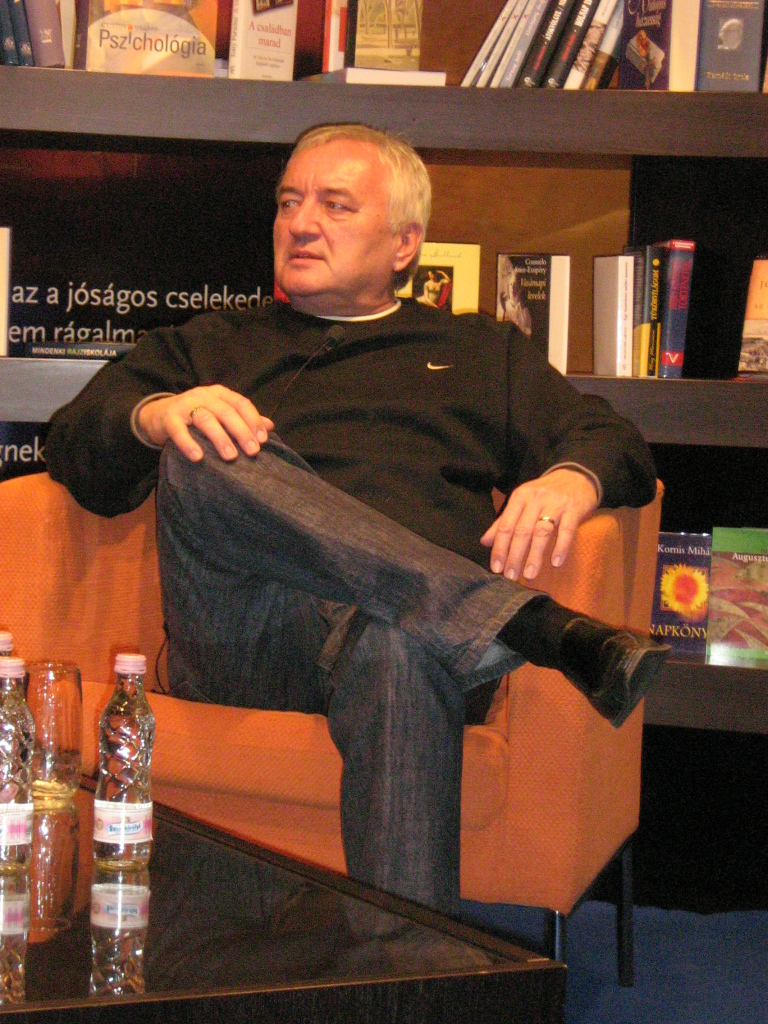
- Havas in 2008

Spokesperson of the Government of Hungary
- In office 1 November 1995 – 7 November 1995
- Preceded by: Elemér Csák
- Succeeded by: Elemér Kiss

Personal details
- Born: Henrik Rokobauer; June 25, 1949 (age 76) Újpest, Hungary
- Spouse: Mária Székelyi
- Children: Henrik; Nikoletta
- Profession: journalist, anchorman, spokesman

Henrik Havas (born 25 June 1949 as Henrik Rokobauer) is a Hungarian journalist who served as spokesman of the Hungarian government from 1 November 1995 to 7 November 1995.

He worked as news editor of the Magyar Rádió between 1979 and 1986 and as anchorman of the Krónika magazine from 1985. He left the radio in 1995. He received a Táncsics Mihály Prize in 1999.

Havas was the anchorman of the Nap TV's only program, Nap-kelte from 1989. He was also fired during the Media Crisis in 1994, but shortly after he was taken back. In the next year Gyula Horn appointed him state secretary in a charge of communicational affairs of the Prime Minister's Office (de facto government spokesman). However, soon it turned out that one of his inferiors, Endre Mihályi was involved in an embezzlement case. As a result, Havas had to resign together with his staff after just six days.

His employer since 1999 has been the RTL Klub. He was one of the seven performers of the Heti hetes talk show (Hungarian version of 7 Tage, 7 Köpfe).

He has been diagnosed with bipolar disorder.
