= Sándor Pörzse =

Hungarian politician (born 1959)

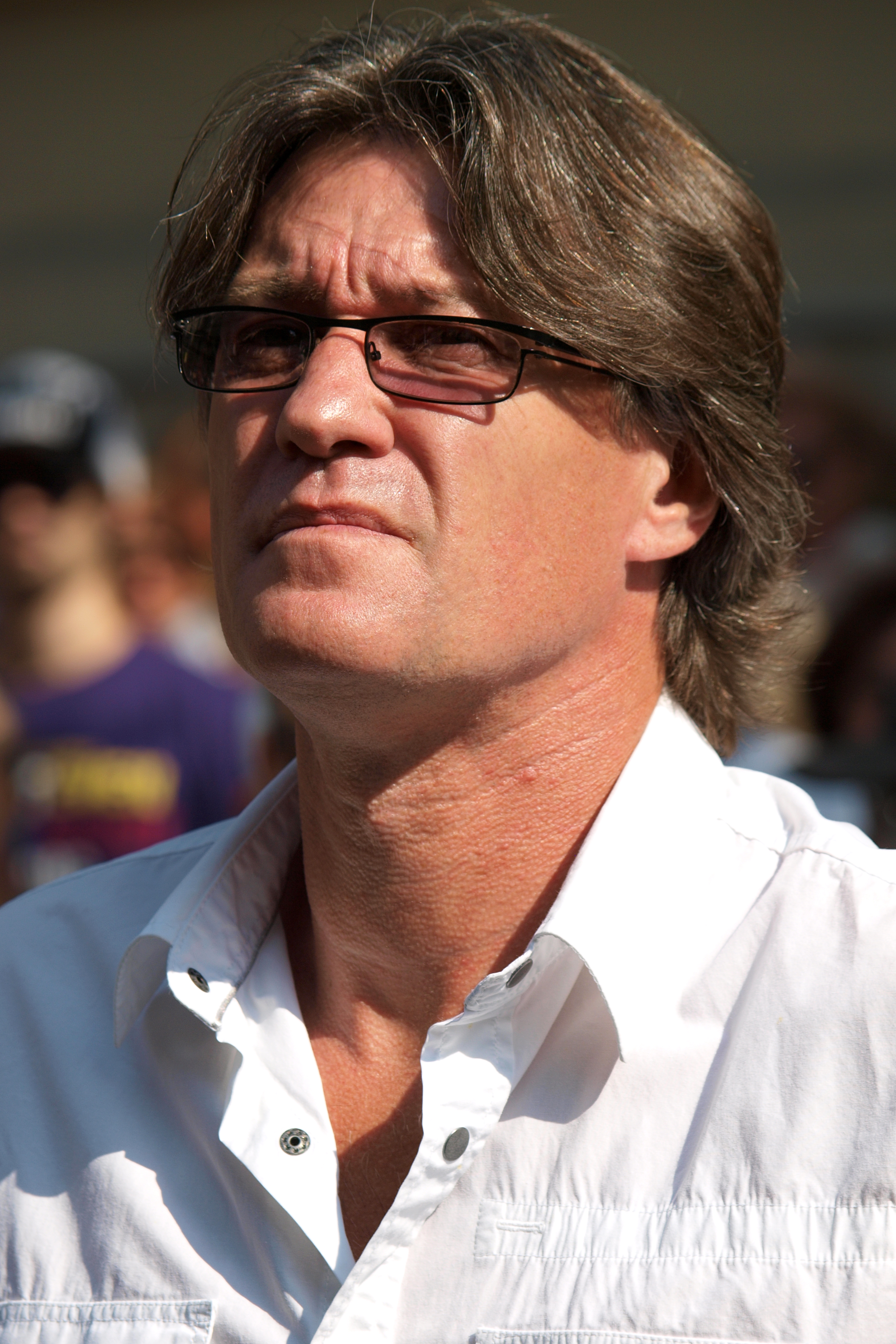
- Sándor Pörzse in 2011

Member of the National Assembly
- In office 14 May 2010 – 5 May 2014

Personal details
- Born: 1959 (age 66–67) Budapest, Hungary
- Party: Jobbik (since 2010)
- Profession: journalist, politician

Sándor Pörzse (born 1959) is a Hungarian journalist, television presenter and politician, former chief editor of the now defunct Jobbik-affiliated weekly Barikád. Pörzse was a member of the National Assembly (MP) from 2010 to 2014.

== Life ==
Pörzse graduated from the Szent László Gimnázium in 1978. He earned a degree of PR expert at the Foreign Trade Advertising and Propaganda Faculty of the Hungarian Chamber of Commerce in 1984. He was a professional footballer too until 1987. He started his media career as a sport journalist at the Magyar Rádió in 1989. Later he worked for commercial radio channels Danubius, Calypso and Bridge. After that he joined Magyar Televízió, where he edited pop music and lifestyle shows. He was a news presenter at TV3.

He was an inaugural anchorman in the newly founded Hír TV since 2002, where he also directed the sports editing. He became popular via his first public talk show Terítéken. He transferred to Echo TV in 2007, where he led Pörzsölő and Kibeszélő. Soon he became one of the most notable figures of the right-wing television channel. Around the same time he launched his DVD series Csillagösvényen about Hungarian alternative history, traditions and heritage. Pörzse was a founding member of the paramilitary movement Magyar Gárda in August 2007. He ran as an independent candidate in the mayoral by-election of Tahitótfalu on 1 February 2009, when he came to the second place, receiving 36.75 percent of the vote. As he steadily approached to far-right party Jobbik over the years, he quit his job at Fidesz-close Echo TV on 27 November 2009, citing a top-down censorship against his working methods and shows. In January 2010, he became editor-in-chief of weekly Barikád, the unofficial party newspaper of Jobbik. He also joined the party in the same time.

Pörzse was an individual candidate of Jobbik in the 1st District of Budapest during the 2010 parliamentary election, where he came to the fourth (last) place. He was elected a Member of Parliament from his party's Budapest regional list. He was involved in the Culture and Press Committee and its three sub-committees from 2010 to 2014.

== Filmography ==
- Csillagösvényen, DVD, Budapest, 2006.
- Csillagösvényen II. (Titokzatos mondáink, A magyar nép rejtélyes eredete és nyelve, Betyárvilág, Az ősnyelv), DVD, Budapest, 2007.
- Csillagösvényen III. (Magyar kereszténység, Keresztény Magyarság, Az elfelejtett Rongyos Gárda, A Madagaszkári királyság, Magyar Géniuszok, Az Ősnyelv), DVD, Budapest, 2008.
- Csillagösvényen IV. (Halálra ítélt zászlóalj, Szökésének oka: Hazaszeretet, Világnak királya: Attila), DVD, Budapest, 2009

== Bibliography ==
- Terítéken, Füleky Kft., Budapest, 2004, ISBN 963-217-513-1
- Bulcsú, Pytheas Könyvkiadó, Budapest, 2008, ISBN 978-963-9746-53-4
