= Spokesperson of the Government of Hungary =

The Spokesperson of the Government of Hungary is responsible for gathering and disseminating information regarding the Cabinet to the media. The position has existed since 1986. The position has been held by Eszter Vitályos since 2024.

== List of office-holders ==
=== During Communism ===
- Rezső Bányász (1986–1988)
- György Marosán, Jr. (1988–1989)
- Zsolt Bajnok (1989–1990)

=== Antall–Boross Governments ===
- Balázs László (1990–1991)
- Judit Juhász (1991–1994; for only internal affairs until 1992)

=== Horn Government ===
- Evelyn Forró (1994–1995)
- Elemér Csák (Feb–Jun 1995)
- Henrik Havas (1–7 Nov 1995)
- Elemér Kiss (1995–1998)

=== First Orbán Government ===
- Gábor Borókai (1998–2002)

=== Medgyessy Government ===
- Zoltán J. Gál (2002–2004)
- Erika Gulyás (2004)

=== First and Second Gyurcsány Governments ===
- András Batiz (2004–2006)
- Boglár László (2004–2005; alongside Batiz)
- Emese Danks (2006–2007)
- Bernadett Budai (2007–2009)
- Dávid Daróczi (2007–2009; alongside Budai)

=== Bajnai Government ===
- Bernadett Budai (Apr–Nov 2009)
- Domokos Szollár (2009–2010; alongside Budai until Nov 2009)

=== Second, Third, Fourth, Fifth Orbán Governments ===
- Anna Nagy (2010–2011)
- András Giró-Szász (2011–2014)
- Éva Kurucz (2014–2015)
- Zoltán Kovács (2015–2018; for international affairs: 2014–2026)
- István Hollik (2018–2019)
- Alexandra Szentkirályi (2020–2024)
- Eszter Vitályos (2024–2026)

=== Magyar Government ===
- Anita Köböl (2026– )
- Éva Magyar (2026– )
- Vanda Szondi (2026– )

== Sources ==
- Sereg, András (2021-04-22). "Kormányszóvivők Bányász Rezsőtől Szentkirályi Alexandráig". index.hu (in Hungarian).
