= Hír TV =

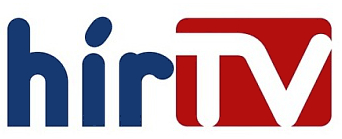
- Current used logo since 2015
- Country: Hungary
- Broadcast area: National, also distributed in Hungary; Worldwide
- Headquarters: Angol u. 65–69., 1149, Budapest, Hungary

Programming
- Language: Hungarian

Ownership
- Owner: Central European Press and Media Foundation

Links
- Website: www.hirtv.hu

Hír TV is a Hungarian television news channel, the first of such made in the country. It began broadcasting on 2 January 2003.

== History ==
=== Initial years ===
On 26 November 2002, the TV channel was registered using 20 million Hungarian forints (~64.350 euros) of capital. The first CEO of television was Gábor Borókai, who had recently served as Viktor Orbán's first government spokesman (from 1998 to 2002), and the first editor-in-chief was Imre Dlusztus, who was the sometime editor-in-chief of Délmagyarország (meaning "Southern Hungary"), the local newspaper of Szeged.

The first test broadcast began on 2 December 2002. After one month of test broadcasts, the TV channel started its regular broadcasting on 2 January 2003, according to contract with several cable television companies.

=== Role in the 2006 protests in Hungary ===
Hír TV was the only channel to broadcast continuous live coverage of the 2006 anti-government protests in Hungary. The channel's reports were aired on every Hungarian television channel, as well as on CNN, and via Reuters, the BBC, Euronews and Sky News. Hír TV continued to report on all of the events that took place during the protests. On 18 September 2006, when demonstrators tried to storm the headquarters of the public broadcaster Magyar Televízió in Szabadság tér, the fights that broke out between the police and the protesters at the entrance to the building were not broadcast by Magyar Televízió. Instead, they continued to broadcast their primetime investigation programme Az Este with anchorman György Baló, and he made an announcement at the end of programme that "the television is obsessing by protesters".

Due to the Hír TV coverage, the siege of the Magyar Televízió headquarters building by the anti-government protesters was seen by 1 million viewers in Hungary.

Following the demonstrations and the storming of the Magyar Televízió headquarters, the National Radio and Television Board (ORTT) ruled in its report that the Hír TV channel had violated the "law of objective and factual information providing" and the law of "respect the Hungarian Republic's constitutional order". The channel consequently received a fine of 1 million Hungarian forints for breaching their legal obligations.

=== 2007–2014 ===
Hír TV logo 2005–2015

The first big development came on 15 March 2007, when Hír TV and the daily newspaper Magyar Nemzet (meaning "Hungarian Nation") started up a new radio station called Lánchíd Rádió.

In September 2007, the channel's logo was redesigned and modifications were also made to the programme structure: a new breakfast television programme was introduced, which included live reports and a more informative style of news programme. The primetime TV schedule was also updated, with the introduction of new programmes: Rájátszás ("Play-off"); Vonalban ("By the phone"); Civil kaszinó ("Civil Casino"); Lapzárta ("Deadline"), in which the anchor and the guests talk about the articles published in the main Hungarian daily newspapers; Paletta ("Palette"), a programme about public issues; and Panaszkönyv ("Complaints book"), which focuses on consumer protection.

Hír TV also airs investigative reports, political discussion programmes, talk shows and morning programmes. In addition, Hír TV broadcasts BBC programmes such as Click, Reporters and Talking Movies with Hungarian translation.

=== 2015: A year of change ===
Some newspaper sources began to report in 2014 that the longterm positive relationship between the channel's owner, Lajos Simicska, and prime minister Viktor Orbán had deteriorated. In February 2015, Simicska declared in an interview with the social-democratic newspaper Népszava (meaning "The People's Voice") that "there is a total media war" in progress. Following this statement, he received resignations from the editors-in-chief, and their assistants, of Magyar Nemzet, Hír TV, Lánchíd Rádió and MNO; Simicska subsequently launched a verbal tirade against his former employees, as well as the prime minister.

Meanwhile, the state broadcaster MTVA decided to establish a news channel, M1, which up to this point had been incorporated into the generalist channel of MTVA. Some of Hír TV's anchors went to work for the new MTVA news channel.

In response to this event, in September 2015, the pro-government newspaper Magyar Idők (meaning "The Hungarian Times") was established by journalists previously employed by Simicska's outlets. At the same time, the Hír TV channel completely changed both its logo and its programmes.

The station became immediately threatened by the government, with cable companies being pressured to drop the channel. At least one minor operator did drop the channel, after receiving a bribe by the government in exchange for doing so. However, its ratings did increase during this period, at a point where the ratings were three times higher by 2018.

=== 2018: merger with Echo TV ===
After the relations between Simicska and Orbán deteriorated, and Orbán's landslide re-election in the 2018 parliamentary election, Simicska was forced to close most of its media outlets, owing to serious financial difficulties. Magyar Nemzet published its last edition in April, and Lánchíd Rádió stopped broadcasting its daily programmes shortly thereafter. Although Simicska maintained ownership of Hír TV in the interim, he was eventually forced to sell the station in late July to his former business partner Zsolt Nyerges, who later subsumed the station into the Central European Press and Media Foundation holding.

Although both Hír TV and another pro-government news channel, Echo TV maintained separate programming in the interim, Hír TV rapidly switched its editorial stance to support the Fidesz-KDNP government. This returned the station to the political positions which the station supported on its launch years. Many anchors who worked at the station before 2015 returned, at the same time, many of the new hires from the 2015 relaunch were promptly dismissed. However, on April 1, 2019, both Hír TV and Echo TV merged to form a single news station. Although the surviving entity retains the Hír TV name, most of its programming was carried over from Echo TV, as well as most of its staff and technical equipment, which is housed at the former Nap TV studios in the outskirts of Budapest. The station also changed its visual identity, adopting the visual style carried over from Echo TV.

== Current programmes ==
The channel broadcasts every day from 5:50 am to 2:00 am. The programme themes are targeted on public issues, investigation programme, life style, sport and to culture. The channel tends to interrupt its programmes for breaking news.

=== News programmes ===
- Híradó, hírek ("News"): The channel broadcasts short news bulletins on the hour, as well as longer 30-minute news programmes. The most comprehensive news programme is broadcast every day at 22 hours with the title Híradó22 (News22).
- Hírvilág ("World of News"): Weekly 25 minute long programme which concentrates on foreign political affairs. The focus is on political investigations, analysis of the news backgrounds, and reporting on recent events and today's questions.
- Gazdasági hírek ("Business news"): Reporting on business issues, currency exchange rates and the stock exchange market.
- Kommentár nélkül ("No comment"): This programme contains the channel's unedited reports, as well as reports taken from the Reuters news agency. It mainly broadcasts reports about politicians' press conferences, and disasters.
- Európai híradó ("European News"): Weekly news magazine which focuses on the European Union's political and economical issues. They use reports from the EU and from the British-Hungarian Business Forum, EBS.
- Felfedező ("Explorer"): Programme of foreign affairs editorship which focuses on science and "colorful news".
- Főszerkesztők klubja ("Editors-in-chief Club"): Political discussion programme when the anchor invites the daily newspapers' editors-in-chief, with different political views, to confront one another. The programme sometimes invites bloggers to take part, and editors of the main Hungarian news websites, such as Index.hu, 444.hu, alfahír.hu. The programme broadcasts on Mondays at 8:00 pm. Regulars are: Gábor Borókai (Heti Válasz), Gellért Rajcsányi (Mandiner), Zoltán Kovács (Élet és Irodalom) and Péter Németh (Népszava). There are special guests like editors-in-chief of the daily newspaper Magyar Nemzet and the defunct daily newspaper Népszabadság.

=== Current affairs programmes ===
- Ázsia ("Asia"): Special foreign affairs programme, covering political, cultural, economical and scientific news and developments in Asia.
- Célpont ("Target"): Programme based on investigative journalism, according to the motto: "Because You have a right to know things whereof politicians want You not to know". For example, the investigation of misconduct by those in positions of power, corruption affairs, any lawless or suspicious activities.
- Civil kaszinó ("Civil Casino"): Weekly programme where intellectuals with different professions (doctors, lawyers, economists, historians, actors, musicians, pastors) discuss the activities of political figures, with regard to their recent discourse or their memorable statements of the past week.
- Csörte ("Bout"): Political discussion programme aired at primetime on Fridays. Within the scope of the programme, left-wing and right-wing journalists and political analysts debate on certain topics with the anchorman Levente Bella. Regular guests are: András Stumpf (mandiner.hu), Péter Szakonyi (Napi.hu), journalists, and political scientists from different Hungarian political analyst companies.
- Egyenesen ("Direct"): Hard talk programme about current affairs and politics.
- Magyarország élőben ("Hungary Live"): Political investigation programme, covering the main themes of politics, foreign affairs, public issues, sport and culture.
- Reggeli Járat ("Morning Line"): The channel's breakfast programme which is broadcast on weekdays from 5:50 am to 9:00 am. The programme includes interviews with politicians, discussions on public affairs, and interviews about cultural issues.
- Sznobjektív ("Snobjective": a compound word made from "Snob" and "Objective"): A programme with anchorman and social critic Róbert Puzsér, which broadcasts on Sundays at 8:00 pm.

=== BBC programmes ===
The channel broadcasts the following pre-recorded BBC programmes: Reporters, HARDtalk, Our World and The Travel Show, with Hungarian dubbing provided by the channel's journalists.

== Political views ==
Ever since its founding, the channel was viewed as a Fidesz-sympathizer broadcaster due to its owner's background and the political views of its anchors, a viewpoint that was typical until 2015. Several anchors who defined themselves as right-wingers later worked in the political scene: Ákos Krakkó, the Célpont anchor, worked from 2010 as press agent for the Fidesz parliamentary group, and from 2014 as press agent for the Prime Minister's Office; and in 2014, anchorwoman Éva Kurucz became the spokeswoman for Viktor Orbán's third government.

In 2015, there was a breakdown in relationships between prime minister Orbán and the owner of Hír TV, Lajos Simicska, who had previously been head of Hungary's internal tax revenue service (APEH) in Orbán's first government; the dispute caused the channel's political stance to be modified. Since September 2015, the channel has been increasingly critical against the government and open to left-wing and right-wing intellectuals and opinions.

After the station was sold to the KESMA holding, the channel turned back to its pro-government stance, a move which became more evident after its merger with Echo TV. Many of its pundits also moved to the station after the merger to continue with its own opinionated shows broadcast on the former Echo TV, including Károly Balzsay, Zsolt Bayer, Katalin Liebmann, Zoltán Lomnici, Zoltán Kiszelly and Endre Kadarkai, and many former anchors returned to host shows as part of the new programming.
