= The Real Housewives of Hungary =

Hungarian reality television series

- Feleségek luxuskivitelben
- Genre: Reality television
- Based on: The Real Housewives
- Presented by: Áron Kovács
- Starring: Babett Köllő; Boglárka Csősz; Dalma Smaltig; Réka Rubint; Rita Farkas; Vivien Vasvári; Tünde Polgár; Yvonne Dederick; Nikolett Molnár; Noémi Nagy; Anfisa Bulgakova
- Country of origin: Hungary
- Original language: Hungarian
- No. of seasons: 4 + special
- No. of episodes: 25

Production
- Executive producers: Brigitta Prukner; Zsolt Kulcsár
- Production locations: Budapest; Istanbul; Cape Town
- Camera setup: 48 minutes
- Production companies: Show and Game Productions; Sony Pictures Television Original Production CEE

Original release
- Network: Viasat 3
- Release: September 25, 2017 – present

Feleségek luxuskivitelben (FLK; "Wives in Luxury"), commonly referred to internationally as The Real Housewives of Hungary, is a Hungarian reality television series that debuted on Viasat 3. Developed as international installment of the Real Housewives franchise, it documents the personal and professional lives of several women residing in Budapest.

The show on Viasat 3 was cancelled in December 2020. However, the format was rebooted on December 4, 2023, on the Hungarian TV channel RTL. The rebooted show also got a new title called: A Város Királynői - The Real Housewives of Budapest.

== Episodes ==
=== Series overview ===
Episodes of The Real Housewives of Hungary
Season	Episodes	Originally released	
Season	Episodes	First released	Last released
1	8	September 25, 2017	November 13, 2017
2	9	April 9, 2018	June 11, 2018
Special		August 27, 2018	
3	4	April 20, 2020	May 11, 2020
4	4	November 30, 2020	December 21, 2020

=== Season 1 (2017) ===
No. overall	No. in season	Title	Original release date
1	1	"Episode One"	September 25, 2017
2	2	"Episode Two"	October 2, 2017
3	3	"Episode Three"	October 9, 2017
4	4	"Episode Four"	October 16, 2017
5	5	"Episode Five"	October 23, 2017
6	6	"Episode Six"	October 30, 2017
7	7	"Episode Seven"	November 6, 2017
8	8	"Episode Eight"	November 13, 2017

=== Season 2 (2018) ===
No. overall	No. in season	Title	Original release date
9	1	"Episode One"	April 9, 2018
10	2	"Episode Two"	April 16, 2018
11	3	"Episode Three"	April 23, 2018
12	4	"Episode Four"	April 30, 2018
13	5	"Episode Five"	May 7, 2018
14	6	"Episode Six"	May 14, 2018
15	7	"Episode Seven"	May 28, 2018
16	8	"Episode Eight"	June 4, 2018
17	9	"Reunion"	June 11, 2018

=== Special edition (2018) ===
No. overall	Title	Original release date
18	"Lagzi luxuskivitelben"	August 27, 2018

=== Season 3 (2020) ===
No. overall	No. in season	Title	Original release date
19	1	"Episode One"	April 20, 2020
20	2	"Episode Two"	April 27, 2020
21	3	"Episode Three"	May 4, 2020
22	4	"Episode Four"	May 11, 2020

== Overview and casting ==
The series chronicles the lives of seven Hungarian women.

Main cast members
Cast member	Seasons			
Cast member	1	2	3	4
Boglárka Csősz	Main	Main	Main	Main
Babett Köllő	Main	Main	Main	
Vivien Vasvári	Main	Main	Main	
Dalma Smaltig	Main	Main		
Rita Farkas	Main	Friend		
Réka Rubint	Main			
Yvonne Dederick	Friend	Main	Main	Main
Tünde Polgár		Main	Main	Main
Nikolett Molnár			Main	Main
Noémi Nagy			Main	Main
Anfisa Bulgakova				Main
Friends of the housewives
Catherine Dederick	Guest	Friend	Friend	Friend
Páris Mihályi	Guest	Friend	Friend	Friend
Olivér Pusztai		Guest	Friend	
