= Figyelő =

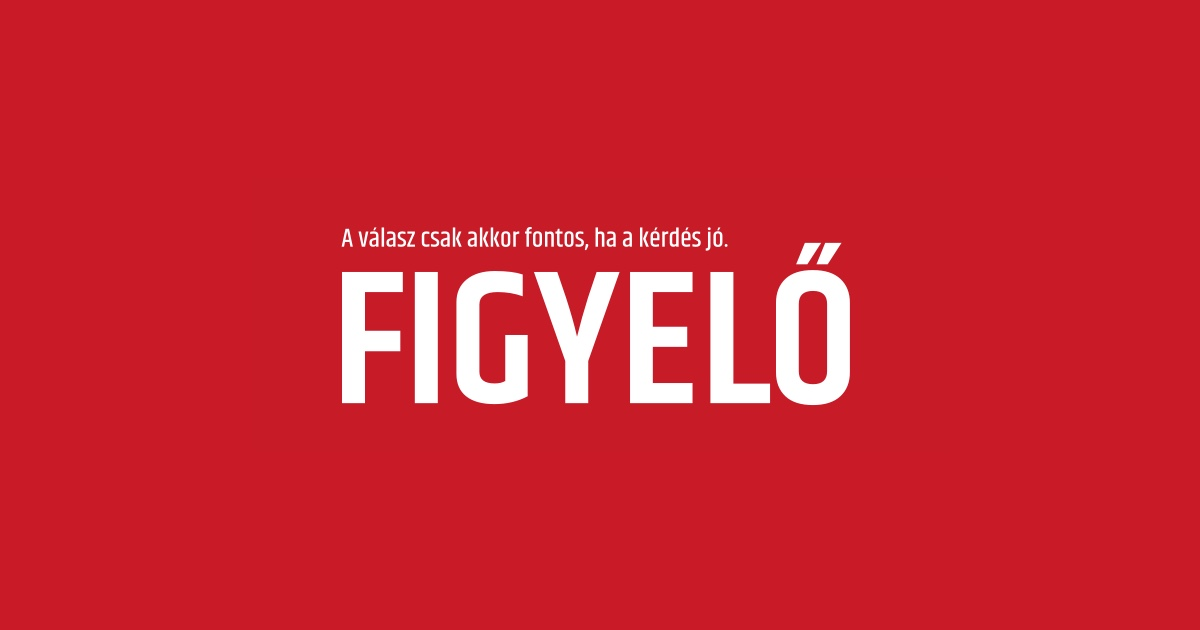
- Editor-in-chief: Bálint Deák
- Deputy Editor-in-chiefs: Melinda Kamasz; Csaba Szajlai
- Editors: János Devecsai; Attila Ditzendy; György Dózsa; Gábor Halaska; Gabriella Lengyel; János Moszkovits; Tamás Pindroch
- Photoeditors: Nóra Somogyi; Alexandra Wanger
- Founders: Viktória Molnár; György Varga
- Categories: Business magazine
- Frequency: Weekly
- First issue: March 7, 1957; 69 years ago (as Gazdasági figyelő)
- Final issue: June 30, 2022; 4 years ago
- Company: K4A Lapkiadó (owned by Mária Schmidt)
- Based in: 8-10 Polgár Street; 1033 Budapest
- Language: Hungarian
- Website: figyelo.hu
- ISSN: 0015-086X
- OCLC: 183389685

Figyelő (Hungarian pronunciation: [ˈfiɟɛløː], English: Observer) was a Christian-conservative Hungarian business magazine published on every Thursday by the Hungarian publishing company K4A Lapkiadó (owned by Mária Schmidt). Figyelő covered a broad range of subjects, such as politics, business, economy, society, technology, and to some extent culture, its approach being economy- or business-related wherever possible.

== History and profile ==
Figyelő was launched in 1957. It has started and covered several infamous stories of Hungarian politics, notably, the "Tocsik-case" in 1996, a corruption scandal related to the then-socialist-liberal government coalition of Hungary. The case was revealed following an article of Figyelő, and later swelled into one of the greatest scandals of the history of post-Cold War Hungary. At the end of the 1990s the magazine was among the independent and investigative publications in Hungary. During this period the weekly was owned by the Dutch company VNU. Some years later, in 2003, Figyelő revealed a huge banking scandal, in which politicians and well-known businessmen were involved. Figyelő received the Hungarian Pulitzer Memorial Award in 2006, and recently its journalists got some other prestigious awards, such as the Prize of Qualitative Journalism.

The publisher of Figyelő is Media City, and its editor-in-chief is Gábor Lambert. The senior editorial staff of the magazine include Melinda Kamasz (deputy editor-in-chief) and László Sas (copy editor). Figyelő's sections are headed by Gergely Brückner (finance, investment), Ágnes Lilla Kovács (society, style), István Váczi (companies, markets, management, small enterprises), György Dózsa (macroeconomy), Zoltán Baka F. (monitor), Gábor Halaska (IT), and Péter Bucsky (science).

According to the Hungarian Circulation Audit Association (Magyar Terjesztésellenőrzési Szövetség, MATESZ) Figyelő sold an average of 10,086 copies in the first quarter of 2012, which gives the weekly a solid position in the market of Hungarian weekly publications.

Figyelő has an online version. Its brand name is also used for the quarterly, thematic publication Figyelő Trend that covers some major market fields each year. The yearly publication Figyelő Top 200 contains listings, details and figures concerning the 200 biggest companies of the Hungarian economy. The publisher also arranges professional conferences under Figyelő's name. Figyelő Top 200 awards are handed over on Gala nights called Figyelő Top 200 Gála, (arranged in the mid of October each year), with the participation of top dogs of the Hungarian economy.

The last print edition of Figyelő was published on 30 June 2022, leaving only the online edition.

== Viktor Orban and antisemitism ==
It has been reported that since the acquisition by K4A Lapkiadó in December 2016 the magazine has actively started to lean heavily in the favour of the policies of Viktor Orbán, for example, in April 2018 it published a list of 200 people claimed to be 'mercenaries' funded by George Soros to topple the Hungarian government.

The cover of a December 2018 issue of Figyelő showed an image of the Federation of Hungarian Jewish Communities president Andras Heisler with money floating around him. The Federation criticized the image as perpetuating antisemitic stereotypes about Jews and money. Despite appeals from the American Jewish Committee, the Jewish Agency, and the World Jewish Congress, Prime Minister Orbán explicitly chose not to condemn the cover.
