= Lajos Simicska =

Hungarian business magnate and former politician

Lajos Simicska (born 28 January 1960) is a former Hungarian business magnate, a former politician of Fidesz, and he was the head of APEH, Hungary's internal revenue service between 1998–1999, during the first government of Viktor Orbán. He was the ninth richest person in Hungary in 2016 (dropped to 49th in 2020). He had extensive media interests, which included Magyar Nemzet, the number one daily conservative newspaper, the radio station Lánchíd Rádió, the weekly magazine Heti Válasz and the television network Hír TV. According to the Influence Barometer, in 2014 he was the 3rd most influential person in Hungary. He has a son Ádám Lajos Simicska who is also a businessman.

The public considered him one of Fidesz 's main allies and beneficiaries. He was a member of the István Bibó vocational college, which later served as the core of Fidesz. Afterwards he became the treasurer of Fidesz, and between 1998–1999 he was the president of APEH. As a businessman, he became the owner of Közgép and the CEO of Mahir, and the opposition regularly criticized the fact that his companies won significantly more state tenders during the rule of Fidesz.

== The G-Day and the "Orbán-Simicska War" ==
At the beginning of 2015 he had made a public vulgar statement about Prime Minister Viktor Orbán, calling him geci (the Hungarian word for semen, also used as an insult towards someone); this event became known by the shorthand 'G-day' and sparked the O1G protest movement. After the fallout, his companies did not win any more public tenders from the state and eventually his main company, Közgép was excluded from public tenders for 3 years.

== Aftermath ==
As a consequence of the fallout with the Hungarian Prime Minister Viktor Orbán, Simicska funded the Jobbik in the 2018 election which at the time was a far-right party. After Viktor Orbán won a third consecutive parliamentary supermajority in the 2018 Hungarian parliamentary election, Simicska shut down the newspaper Magyar Nemzet which had been the top conservative newspaper, and had had an 80 year history in print. He also shut down Lánchíd Rádió. Shortly afterward, Simicska closed or sold all of his remaining holdings.
