= Zoltán Kovács (politician, born 1969) =

Hungarian politician and historian (born 1969)

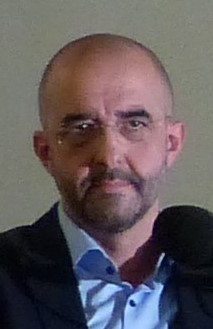
- Kovács in 2016

Hungarian International Spokesperson
- In office 2014–2026
- Prime Minister: Viktor Orbán
- Preceded by: Ferenc Kumin (as Deputy Secretary of State for International Communication)

Secretary of State for Social Inclusion
- In office 2013–2014
- Prime Minister: Viktor Orbán
- Preceded by: Zoltán Balog (as Minister)
- Succeeded by: Károly Czibere (as Secretary of State for Social Affairs and Social Inclusion)

Secretary of State for Social Relations
- In office 2012–2013
- Prime Minister: Viktor Orbán
- Preceded by: None
- Succeeded by: Monika Balatoni (as Secretary of State)

Secretary of State for Government Communication
- In office 2 June 2010 – 2012
- Prime Minister: Viktor Orbán
- Preceded by: None
- Succeeded by: None

Personal details
- Born: 9 February 1969 (age 57) Abaújszántó, Hungary
- Party: Fidesz (since 1997)
- Children: 2
- Profession: Historian, politician

Zoltán Kovács (born 9 February 1969) is a Hungarian historian and politician. He was Viktor Orbán's spokesperson and Hungary's international spokesperson.

== Early life and education ==
Kovács was born in Abaújszolnok during the Hungarian People's Republic era. He graduated from Endre Ságvári High School in Kazincbarcika in 1987. He began his university studies in 1988 at the University of Debrecen, specializing in history and geography. In 1990, he became member of the István Szabó College. Between 1991 and 1992, Kovács was a demonstrator at the Institute of History of Lajos Kossuth University. He began his master's studies at Central European University (CEU) in 1992. In 1993, he obtained an honours degree in history from Lajos Kossuth University, and then a master's degree from CEU. During his studies, he received numerous scholarships. In August 1994, he studied in Austria as part of a summer university, in connection with the country's accession to the European Union. As a result, he has advanced English and conversational German skills. From 1995 to 2000, Kovács was a lecturer at the Lajos Kossuth University in Debrecen while receiving a doctoral scholarship at CEU. Meanwhile, he received a four-month research grant at the University College London and then at the Woodrow Wilson Center. From 1999 to 2004, he was a teaching assistant and then an assistant professor at the Institute of History of the University of Miskolc. He received his PhD from the University of Debrecen in 2001 and a year later from CEU. In 2004, he became an assistant professor at the Institute of History of the University of Debrecen. From 2005 to 2006, he was a member of the faculty of McDaniel College Budapest. His research interests include the history of public opinion, communication theory, early modern and Cold War diplomatic history, and the history of England and Great Britain.

== Career ==
While still a university student, Kovács joined the student government of Kossuth Lajos University, of which he was also the president for a short time. He joined Fidesz in 1997, and he did continuous background work from 2000. He was the founding editor of Debrecen Disputa, a cultural and public journal. He is responsible for the design of the interface of DEOL (Debrecen Online), as well as the design and professional management of the website of the city institutions. In 2006, Kovács was elected a municipal representative in Debrecen and at the same time the municipality's communications adviser. During this time, he was a delegate of the Association of County-Right Cities in the Board of Trustees of the Hungarian Television Public Foundation and a member of the Political Committee of the Council of European Municipalities and Regions. In 2008, he was the head of the Hungarian delegation of the American Council of Young Political Leaders (ACYPL) during the American election campaign. In 2010, Kovács was appointed Secretary of State for Government Communication, a position he held until 2012, when he was appointed Secretary of State for Social Relations at the Ministry of Human Resources. From 2013 to 2014, he was Hungary's Secretary of State for Social Inclusion at the Ministry of Administration and Justice. In 2014, Kovács became Hungary's international spokesperson.

Kovács opposes the European Union's relocation scheme, which seeks to share migrants, following the European migrant crisis, between member states according to quotas. Ahead of the 2016 Hungarian migrant quota referendum, he described it as "unlawful, unworkable and dangerous". In 2018, as a non-elected representative, Kovács expressed his view that only elected representatives have a legitimate right to participate in public life. As Hungary's spokesperson for the Orbán government, he rejected Italy's pleas for the government to intervene in the Ilaria Salis affair. On X (formerly Twitter), he wrote: "We have to make it clear that no one, no extreme left-wing group, should see Hungary as some kind of boxing ring where they come and plan to beat someone to death. And no, no direct request from the Italian government (or any major media outlet) to the Hungarian government will make it easier to defend Salis's case, because the government, as in any other modern democracy, has no control over the courts."
