= Anna Nagy =

Hungarian journalist and politician (born 1965)

Spokesperson of the Government of Hungary
- In office 29 May 2010 – 12 September 2011
- Preceded by: Domokos Szollár
- Succeeded by: András Giró-Szász

Personal details
- Born: 1965 (age 59–60)
- Children: 1
- Profession: spokesperson

Anna Nagy (born 1965) is a Hungarian journalist. She served as spokesperson of the Hungarian government from 29 May 2010 to 12 September 2011.

== Career ==
She obtained a degree in English studies at the School of English and American Studies of the Faculty of Humanities of the Eötvös Loránd University.
