= Emese Danks =

Hungarian politician

Spokesperson of the Government of Hungary
- In office 1 August 2006 – 5 March 2007
- Preceded by: András Batiz
- Succeeded by: Bernadett Budai; Dávid Daróczi

Personal details
- Profession: spokeswoman

Emese Danks is a Hungarian politician who served as spokeswoman of the Hungarian government from 1 August 2006 to 5 March 2007. She was the spokeswoman of the Tesco-Global Áruházak Zrt. between 2002 and 2006.
