= András Batiz =

Hungarian former television presenter, former government spokesman

Spokesperson of the Government of Hungary with Boglár László until 12 September 2005
- In office 6 October 2004 – 1 August 2006
- Preceded by: Erika Gulyás
- Succeeded by: Emese Danks

Personal details
- Born: May 31, 1975 (age 50); Budapest, Hungary
- Spouse: Krisztina Debre
- Children: Iván; Léda
- Profession: anchorman, spokesman

András Batiz (born 31 May 1975) is a Hungarian television journalist who served as spokesman of the Hungarian government from 6 October 2004 to 1 August 2006.

He worked for Magyar Televízió, later for RTL Klub. He was an anchorman and reporter for the daily report magazine Fókusz from 1997 to 2004. Batiz is married and has two children: Iván (b. 2006) and Léda (b. 2010). Since 2007 he is the owner and MD of Impact Works Ltd. where he leads communication trainings for managers primarily in Hungary and the neighboring countries.
