= István Stumpf =

Hungarian politician

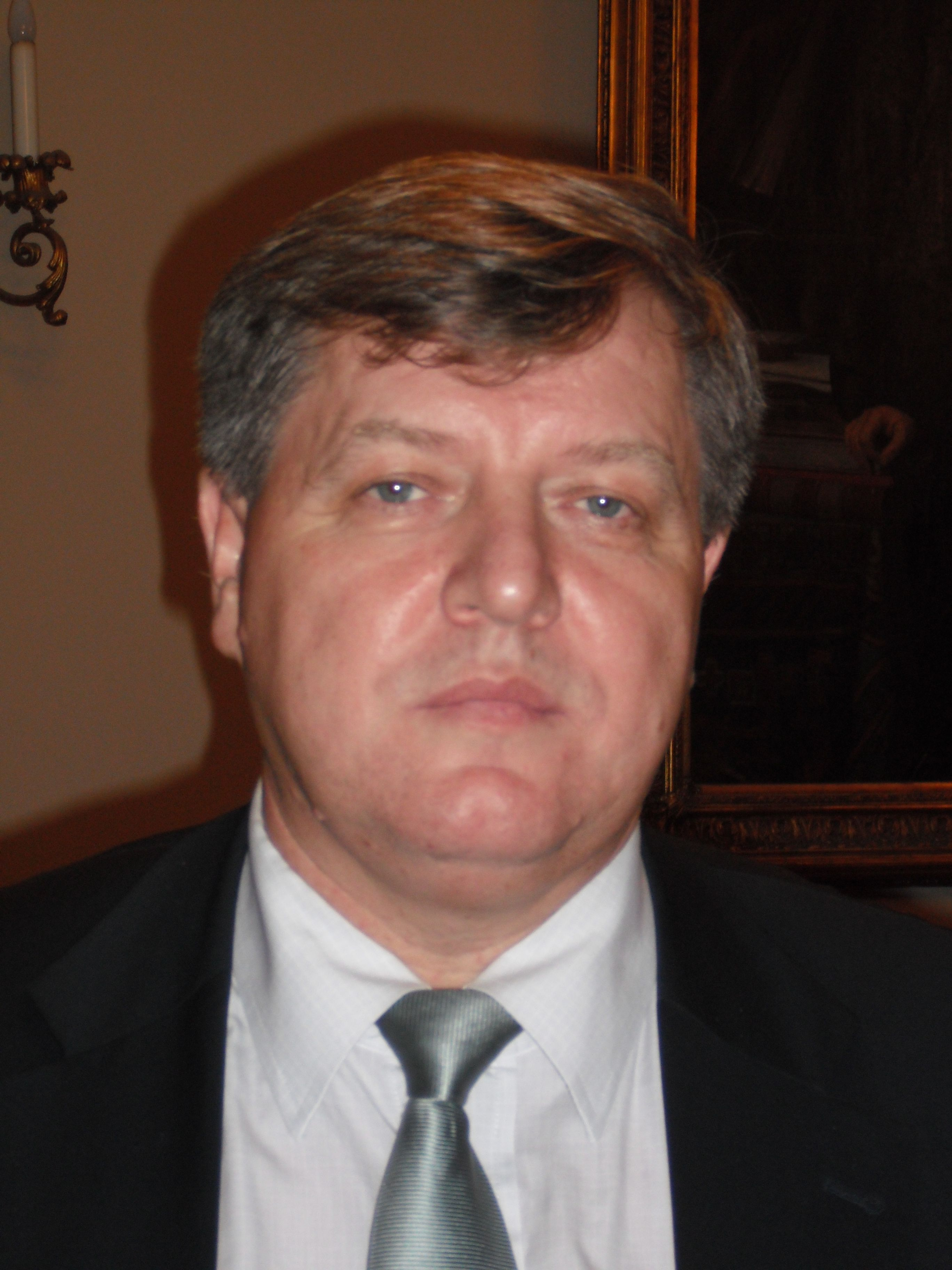
- Stumpf in 2009

Government Commissioner for Universities
- Incumbent
- Assumed office 29 January 2021
- Prime Minister: Viktor Orbán
- Minister: Sándor Pintér

Member of the Constitutional Court
- In office 22 July 2010 – 22 July 2019

Minister in the Prime Minister's Office
- In office 8 July 1998 – 27 May 2002
- Prime Minister: Viktor Orbán
- Preceded by: office created
- Succeeded by: Elemér Kiss

Personal details
- Born: 5 August 1957 (age 69) Sárospatak, Hungary
- Party: Fidesz (1997–present)
- Other political affiliations: MSZMP (formerly); HNF (1988–1990)
- Spouse: Andrea Horváth
- Children: 4
- Education: Eötvös Loránd University
- Occupation: Politician • Jurist

István Stumpf (born 5 August 1957) is a Hungarian politician.

== Biography ==
A former member of the ruling Communist Hungarian Socialist Workers' Party, he was the last Vice President of National Council of the Patriotic People's Front from 1989 to 1990. From 1991 to 1994 he was the youth policy adviser to the president of Hungary, Árpád Göncz. He also served as minister of the Prime Minister's Office (deputy prime minister) from 1998 to 2002 in the first cabinet of Viktor Orbán. He was a constitutional justice at the Constitutional Court of Hungary from July 2010 to July 2019. In the beginning of February 2021, he was appointed for a 2 year term as the Government Commissioner for Universities.

== Personal life ==
He is married. His wife, Andrea Horváth, works as a judge. They have four children.

Political offices
| Preceded by office created | Minister of Prime Minister's Office; 1998–2002 | Succeeded by Elemér Kiss |
