= TV3 (Hungary) =

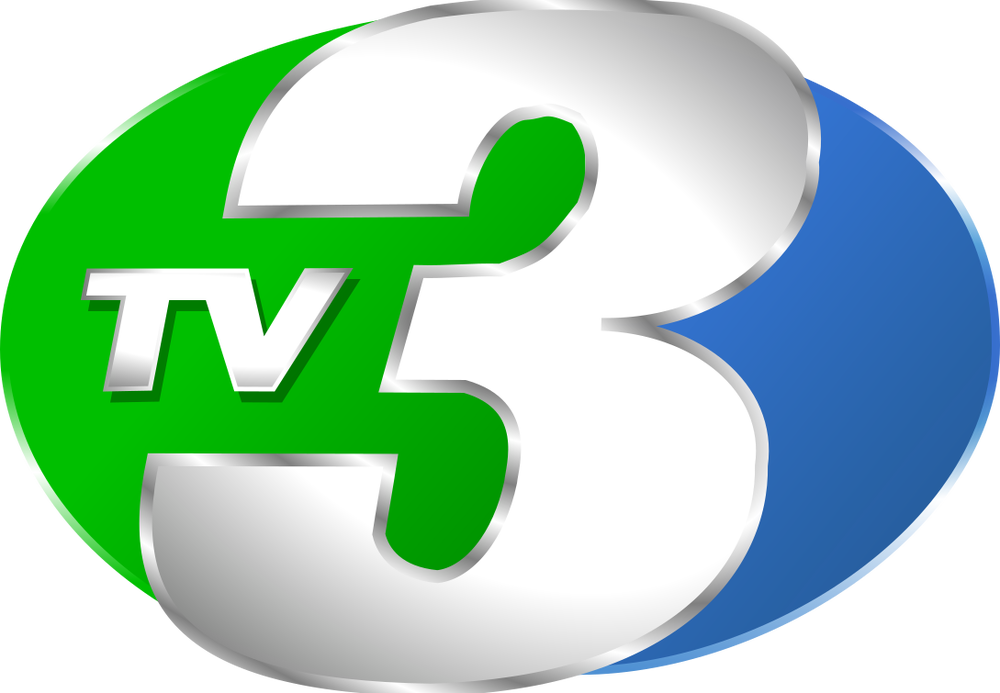
- Country: Hungary
- Broadcast area: Hungary
- Headquarters: Budapest, Hungary

Programming
- Language: Hungarian
- Picture format: 576i (4:3 SDTV)

Ownership
- Owner: Central European Media Enterprises

History
- Launched: 5 November 1994; 32 years ago
- Closed: 21 February 2000; 26 years ago

Links
- Website: www.tv3.hu

TV3 was a commercial television channel broadcast in Hungary.

== History ==
=== The beginnings (1994–1997) ===
Budapesti Kommunikációs Rt., which operated TV3, was founded in 1993, by the Municipality of Budapest at the time of the "media war" in the early 1990s, at the initiative of the assembly of the parties SZDSZ (Alliance of Free Democrats) and Fidesz (Hungarian Civic Alliance). The first experimental release took place in December 1993. Following the elections in 1994, the former opposition lost its interest in the channel, but the company's executives György Iványi (President), András Feuer (Chief Communications Officer, editor of the channel and their associates, later joined Andrew Sarlós (Canadian businessman)) raised their capital and prepared for regular broadcasting. Permanent broadcasting was started by TV3 on November 5, 1994, as a private company. The channel was initially distributed in the AM-Mikro system in Budapest as TV3 Budapest, but beginning 10 September 1996, it began to be distributed via satellite (Amos-1), which, alongside the extant microwave system, reached almost 60% of the Hungarian households. It was the first nationwide distributed channel. The initial plan stipulated coverage in 30% of the Hungarian cable networks, and, after October, reaching 40%.

=== Change of owner, renewed TV3 (1997–2000) ===
According to the 1996 Media Act, three applications for the national analogue terrestrial frequencies were launched - Central European Media Enterprises (as Írisz TV), RTL Group and SBS Broadcasting Group - for the two concessions. Írisz TV applied for both frequencies but lost the application. However, RTL Group won with a higher amount than the TV3 bid, so the tender was not to be won. Central European Media Enterprises has filed a lawsuit that has been delayed until 2000.

Following the unsuccessful bid to use a prepaid program package in the hope of winning the concession tender, the company operating TV3 was purchased in 1997 by CME, Lauder Group, and the former US Ambassador in Budapest, Mark Palmer.

This phase was also marked by the off-beat weather forecasts delivered by Horváth Szilárd.

=== The end ===
In 2000, Budapesti Kommunikációs Rt. and its rights were purchased by the SBS Broadcasting Group. With this, the operation of TV3 at the same time ended. The rumor of the end of the channel was announced by newsreader Mihály Hardy in the news program Hír3. The broadcast of TV3 ended after Hír3's final edition, consisting of the following speech:

"Önök a Hír 3 utolsó adását, a TV3 utolsó programjának utolsó perceit látták. A TV3-ban tulajdonosváltás történt: a cég veszteségeit tovább nem finanszírozzák. Jelenlegi formájában 2,5 éven át működött a TV3, ezalatt az idő alatt megpróbáltunk Önöknek igényes szórakoztató programokat és független, profi hírműsort sugározni. Köszönöm, hogy az elmúlt 2 évben kitartottak a TV3 mellett, hogy megnézték műsorainkat, hogy egyre többen lettek a Hír 3, a Napkelte, a 72 Óra, a Jövőnéző, a Sportváltó, egy szóval saját készítésű műsoraink rendszeres nézői. A Napkelte hírek szerint egy másik kereskedelmi csatornán, az ATV-n, napokon belül folytatja sugárzását. A TV3 többi műsorának itt, most, vége. Mégegyszer köszönöm hogy velünk tartottak. Ma este fél 8 után hiába keresik a TV3-at, a helyén nem lesz semmi. Filmes nyelven szólva ennyi. Vége. Viszontlátásra."

In English: "You have been watching the last broadcast of Hír 3, the last minutes of TV3's last program. There was a change of ownership at TV3: the company's losses are no longer financed. In its current form, TV3 operated for two and a half years, during such time we tried to broadcast demanding entertainment programs and independent, professional news programs. Thank you for sticking with TV3 over the past two years, for watching our programs, for more and more people in becoming regular viewers of Hír 3, Nap-kelte, 72 Óra, Jövőnéző, Sportváltó, basically, our in-house programs. According to reports, Nap-kelte will resume broadcasting on another commercial channel, ATV, within days. The rest of TV3's programs are over here, now. Thanks again for coming with us. Tonight after 7:30pm they look for TV3 in vain, but there will be nothing in its place. In film terms, that's it. It's over. Goodbye."

=== Name disputes ===
In 2007, when TV2 and RTL Klub celebrated its 10th birthday, the old TV3 team organized a meeting at the former Hűvösvölgyi Road headquarters. Viasat 3 was launched on 14 October 2000. Viasat's channel was run under the name TV3 in many countries, but this was not the case here. They have repeatedly attempted to acquire the rights, but ultimately their attempts were unsuccessful, and finally, the name of Viasat's TV6 channel was changed to Viasat 6 in February 2011. On January 1. 2010 TV2 Klub formerly FEM3 began broadcasting a channel for women. The channel was originally called TV3, but changed its name before leaving, probably due to legal disputes.
