= Bernadett Budai =

Hungarian politician

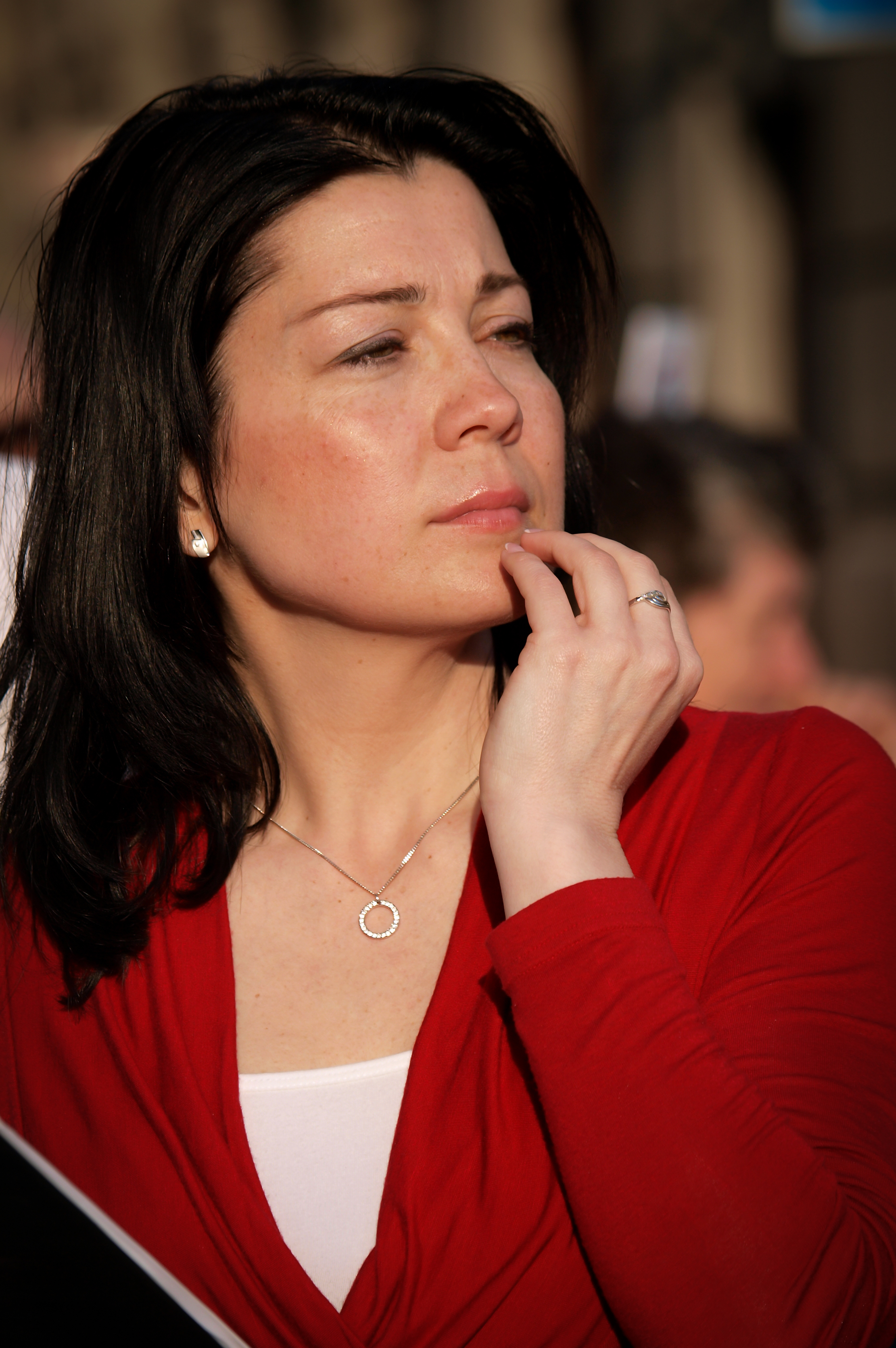
- Budai in 2015

Spokesperson of the Government of Hungary with Dávid Daróczi until 24 April 2009 with Domokos Szollár from 15 May 2009
- In office 19 June 2007 – 1 November 2009
- Preceded by: Emese Danks
- Succeeded by: Domokos Szollár

Personal details
- Born: Bernadett Bugyik; March 31, 1979 (age 46); Budapest, People's Republic of Hungary
- Political party: MSZP
- Profession: political scientist, politician, spokeswoman

Bernadett Budai (née Bugyik; born 31 March 1979) is a Hungarian politician who served as spokeswoman of the Hungarian government from June 2007 to November 2009. She is the spokeswoman of the Hungarian Socialist Party. Budai lost her parliamentary seat on the 2010 Hungarian elections.
