= House of Terror =

Museum in Budapest, Hungary

- Terror Háza

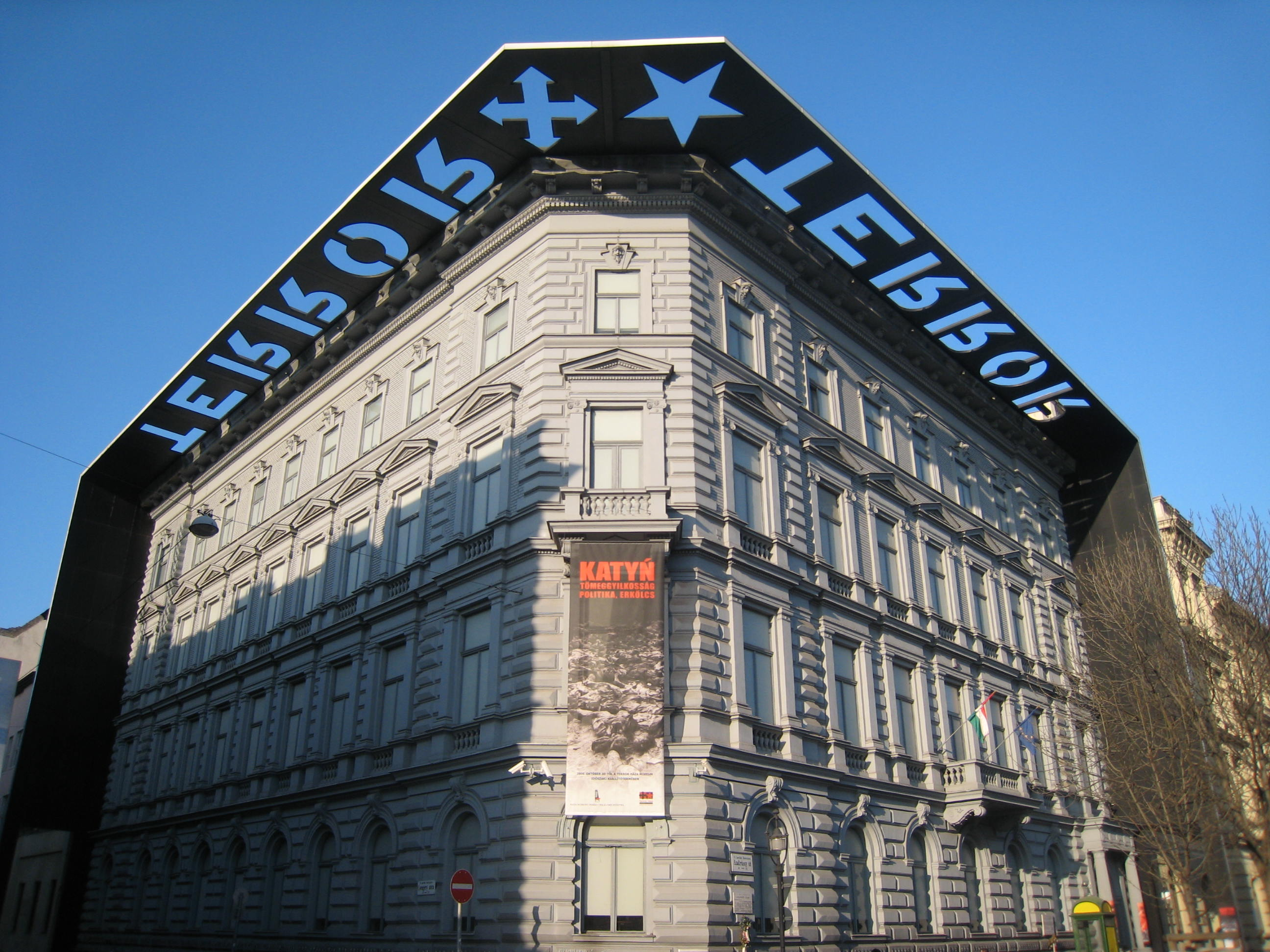
- House of Terror
- Established: 24 February 2002
- Location: Budapest, Hungary
- Coordinates: 47.5069°N 19.0651°E
- Director: Mária Schmidt
- Website: terrorhaza.hu/en

The House of Terror (Hungarian: Terror Háza Múzeum, pronounced [ˈtɛrːor ˈhaːzɒ ˈmuːzɛum]) is a museum located at Andrássy Avenue 60 in Budapest, Hungary. It contains exhibits related to the fascist and communist regimes in 20th-century Hungary and is also a memorial to the victims of these regimes, including those detained, interrogated, tortured, or killed in the building.

The museum opened on 24 February 2002, and its director general has been Mária Schmidt.

The House of Terror is a member organization of the Platform of European Memory and Conscience. Visitors including Zbigniew Brzezinski, Francis Fukuyama, and Hayden White have praised the institution.

== Building ==
The building was previously used by the Arrow Cross Party and ÁVH.

In December 2000, the Public Foundation for the Research of Central and Eastern European History and Society purchased it with the aim of establishing a museum in order to commemorate the fascist and communist periods of Hungarian history.

During the year-long construction period, the building was fully renovated. The internal design, the final look of the museum's exhibition hall, and the external facade are all the work of architect Attila Ferenczfy-Kovács. The reconstruction plans for the museum were designed by architects János Sándor and Kálmán Újszászy. The reconstruction turned the exterior of the building into somewhat of a monument: the black exterior structure (consisting of the decorative entablature, the blade walls, and the granite footpath) provides a frame for the museum, making it stand out in sharp contrast to the other buildings on Andrássy Avenue.

== Permanent exhibition ==
The museum's permanent exhibition contains material related to the nation's relationships to Nazi Germany and the Soviet Union. It also contains exhibits related to Hungarian organisations such as the fascist Arrow Cross Party and the communist ÁVH (similar to the Soviet KGB). Part of the exhibition takes visitors to the basement, where examples of cells used by the ÁVH to torture prisoners can be seen.

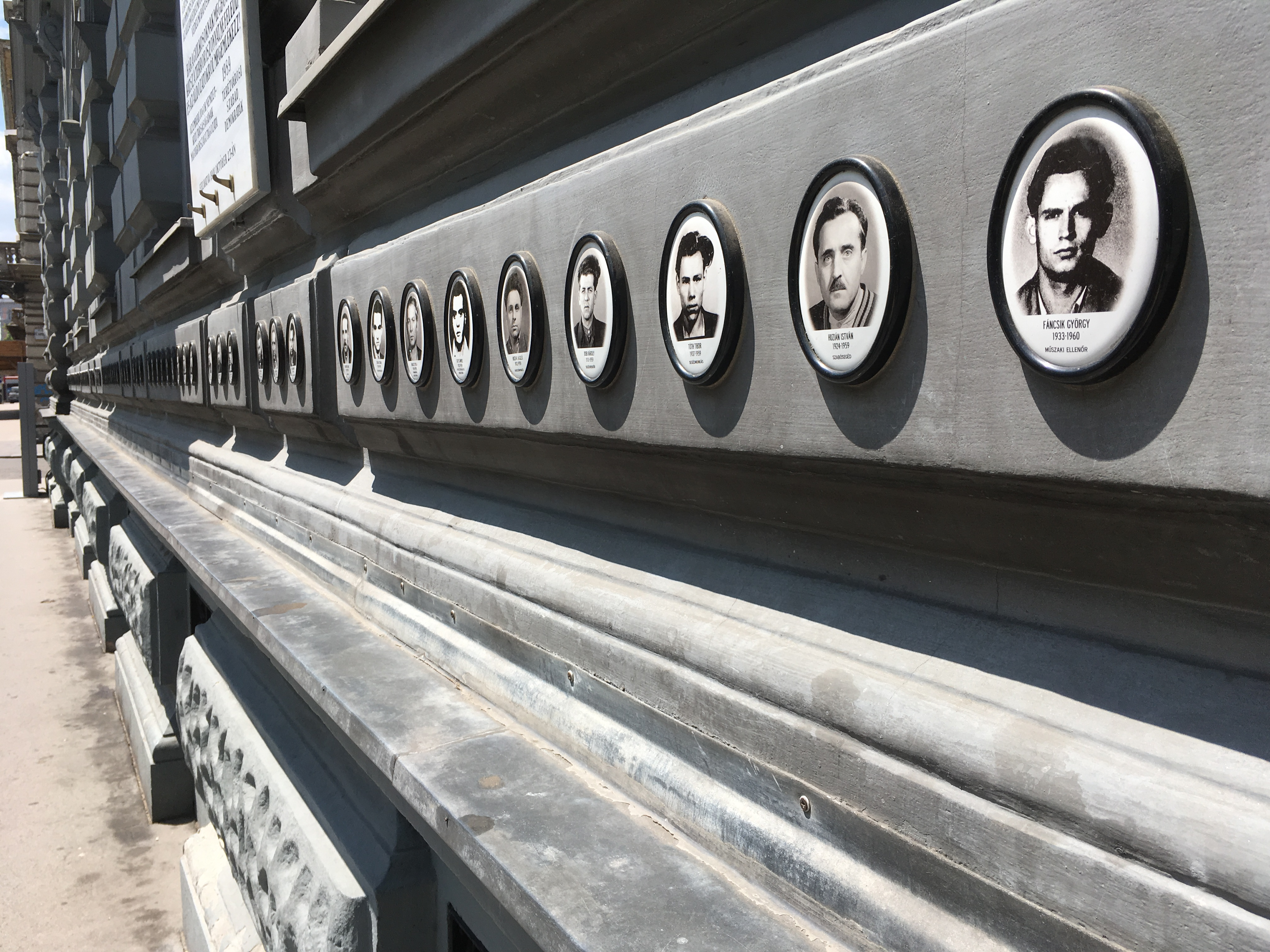
Images of victims on the outside of the House of Terror Museum

== Reception ==
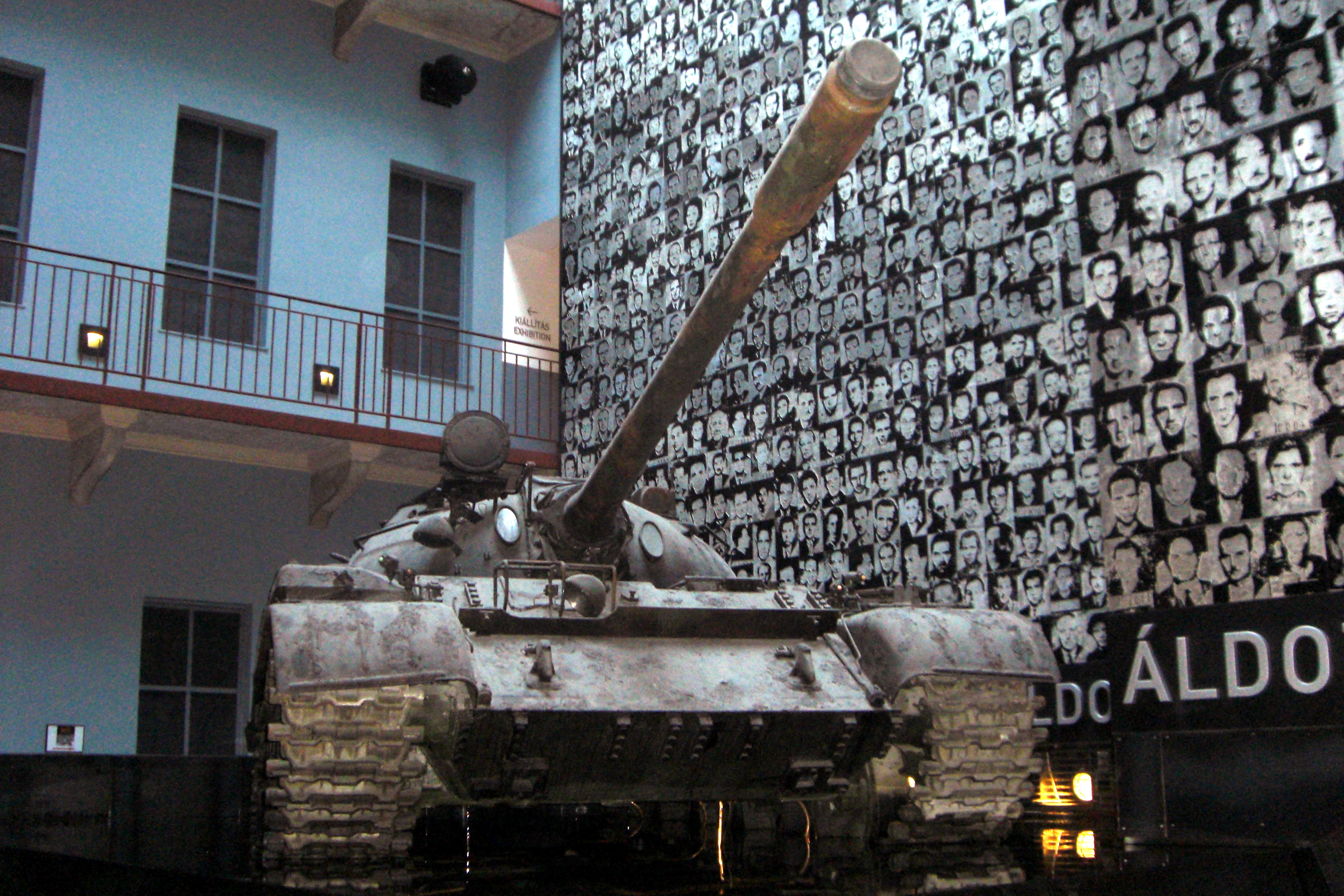
T-55 tank, with photos of the victims of Hungarian Communism

Some historians, journalists, and political scientists such as Magdalena Marsovszky or Ilse Huber have argued that the museum excessively portrays Hungary as the victim of foreign occupiers and does not sufficiently recognise the contribution that Hungarians themselves made to the regimes in question.

In September 2026, the Hungarian government, led by the recently elected Tisza Party, announced a temporary closure of the museum in order to conduct a review of its contents. This decision was subsequently reversed, following outcry by the outgoing Fidesz party. The review is set to proceed nevertheless.
