= O1G =

Hungarian political meme targeted towards Viktor Orbán

Orbán 1 geci, in logo form as it is sometimes displayed

Guy Verhofstadt
@guyverhofstadt

People are fed up with Orbán & co and they are ready to push back, starting by demanding free media. Your place is in Europe my friends, keep up Hungarian #democracy! 📣 #O1G #Budapest

16 Dec 2018

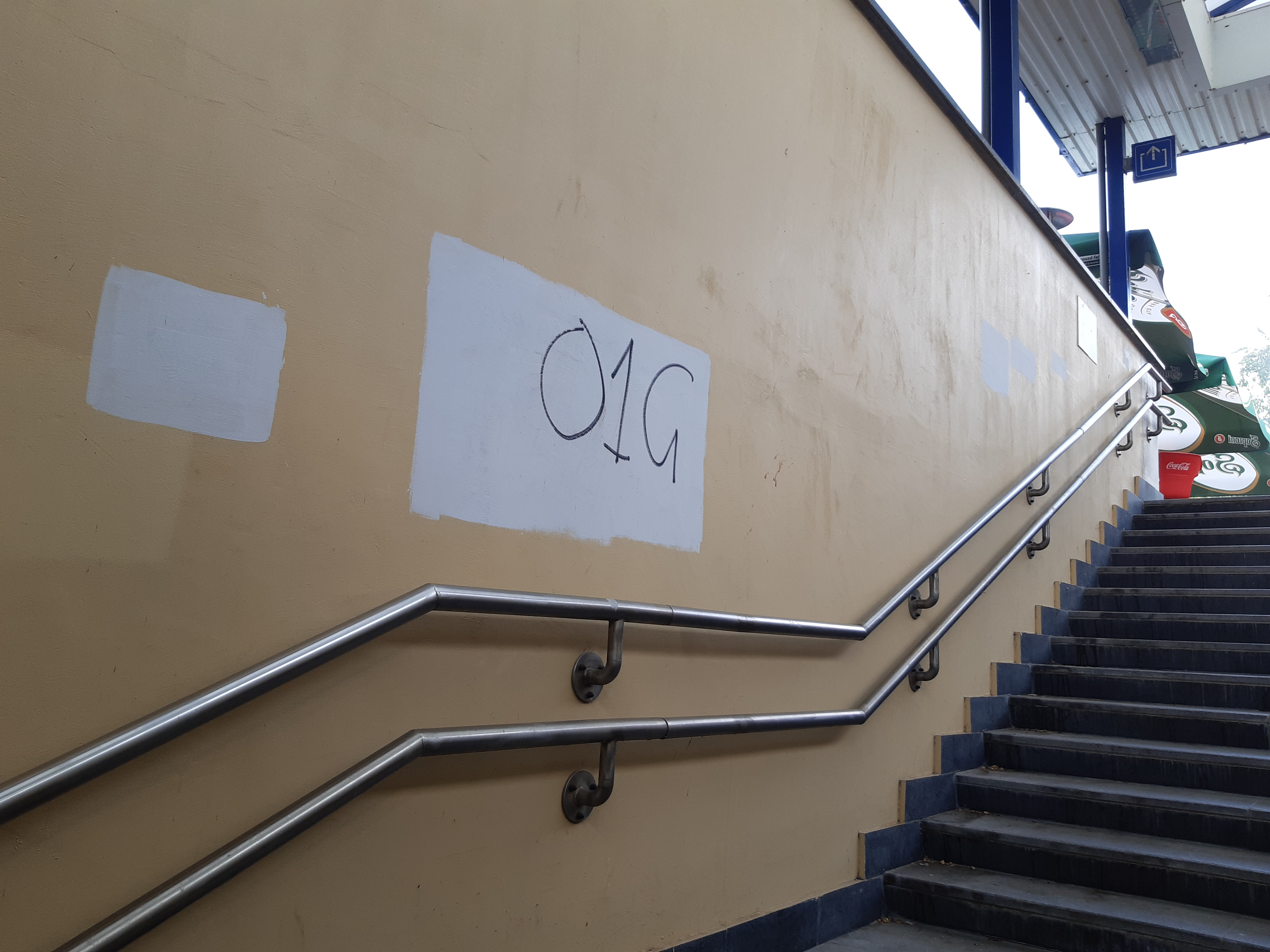
O1G graffiti on the wall in underpass of train station of Agárd

O1G is a meme that became a political symbol of the public protests against the government leadership of Viktor Orbán of Hungary. O1G is an acronym of the country-wide popular term Orbán egy geci, which roughly translates to Orbán is a motherfucker or Orbán is a cunt in English, with egy meaning both one (hence the 1 in the abbreviation), as well as the article a. The word geci is a vulgar term for semen, widely used in slang to describe an especially unpleasant person. The abbreviation has become a communication tool in international politics, after Guy Verhofstadt, the leader of the Alliance of Liberals and Democrats for Europe Group of European Parliament, used the #O1G hashtag in a Twitter message supporting the Hungarian anti-government demonstrations.

== Origin ==
The origins of the term can be traced back to "G-day" when Fidesz-backed businessman and oligarch Lajos Simicska in February 2015 openly clashed with Prime Minister Viktor Orbán after several top managers of his media interests had resigned. The enraged Simicska put a strong emphasis in the interviews with several Hungarian news outlets that Orban is "jizz". The backdrop of the conflict was that the government, which levied a significant tax for ad revenues against media outlets with high revenues, also hit Simicska's Hír TV, which led to a struggle with Orbán's leadership. The clash of the two, which became known as the Orbán–Simicska conflict, resulted in an open political and media war, and among the results were that the formerly Orbán-supporting Hír TV became one of the most important voices of opposition until the new turnaround in August 2018.

== Symbolical meaning ==
The abbreviation (O1G) appeared for the first time in December 2017 on the Internet and later, a more sophisticated, simplified symbol was launched on the commentary section of 444.hu, by an unknown graphic artist named regor, which at the end of 2017 was popularized by Lajos Simicska on his Facebook and Tumblr sites. As a result of the December 2018 wave of protests, the O1G symbol became widely used in objection against the Orbán government and his Fidesz party-led parliament on Facebook profiles and also appeared on a number of banknotes, on coins, banners, sidewalk graffiti, and public light projections. Some public figures began adopting the term as a political expression, including the Belgian politician Guy Verhofstadt, leader of the Alliance of Liberals and Democrats for Europe. Its dissemination, similarly to other Internet memes, is predominantly important in various opposition political communities, while government-friendly media outlets try to remove it from the public discourse, or attempt to discredit it as immoral, vulgar, and unacceptable.

== Appearance in popular culture ==
On its 2017 album, Nihilista Rock 'N' Roll, the Hungarian punk band HétköznaPICSAlódások features a song called "Geciország" (Jizzland), based on the popular anti-Orbán slogan.

== See also ==
- Putin khuylo!, a similar slogan targeting Vladimir Putin
- Let's Go Brandon, euphemism for "Fuck Joe Biden"

== Sources ==
- Az O1G beindította a mémgyárat (Alfahír, 18 December 2018)
