= Boglár László =

Hungarian politician

Spokesperson of the Government of Hungary with András Batiz
- In office 6 October 2004 – 12 September 2005
- Preceded by: Erika Gulyás
- Succeeded by: András Batiz

Personal details
- Profession: spokesperson

Boglár László is a Hungarian politician who served as spokesperson of the Hungarian government from 6 October 2004 to 12 September 2005. After that Ferenc Gyurcsány appointed her press officer of the Prime Minister.
