= Zoltán J. Gál =

Hungarian politician and journalist

Spokesperson of the Government of Hungary
- In office 27 May 2002 – 2 August 2004
- Preceded by: Gábor Borókai
- Succeeded by: Erika Gulyás

Personal details
- Born: 3 May 1973 (age 53) Budapest, Hungarian People's Republic
- Party: MSZP
- Profession: journalist, politician, spokesman

Zoltán J. Gál (born 3 May 1973) is a Hungarian politician and journalist who served as a spokesman of the Hungarian government from 27 May 2002 to 2 August 2004. His father is Zoltán Gál, a former Interior Minister and Speaker of the National Assembly of Hungary.

He worked for the Népszabadság, the Magyar Hírlap and the Népszava as a journalist. He became a member of the National Assembly in 2002 from the Hungarian Socialist Party's national list. Péter Medgyessy unseated him on 2 August 2004 but after a few days, the Prime Minister also fell. According to the press information, Gál had good relation with the Minister of Youth Affairs and Sports Ferenc Gyurcsány. Maybe as a result, he returned to the politics as the political state secretary of the Prime Minister's Office when Gyurcsány was appointed PM.

Gál gained a parliamentarian seat in the 2006 elections again and held his position of a state secretary. On 21 January 2008, he resigned referring to family reasons. His successor was Ádám Ficsor. According to the press, Gál's relationship with the Prime Minister decayed. He served as an editor-in-chief of weekly Vasárnapi Hírek ("Sunday News") from 2010 to 2017. In the 2019 local elections, Zoltán Gál J., along with Dávid Dorosz, was one of the two campaign managers of Gergely Karácsony, who was elected Mayor of Budapest.
