= Elemér Csák =

Hungarian journalist (1944–2025)

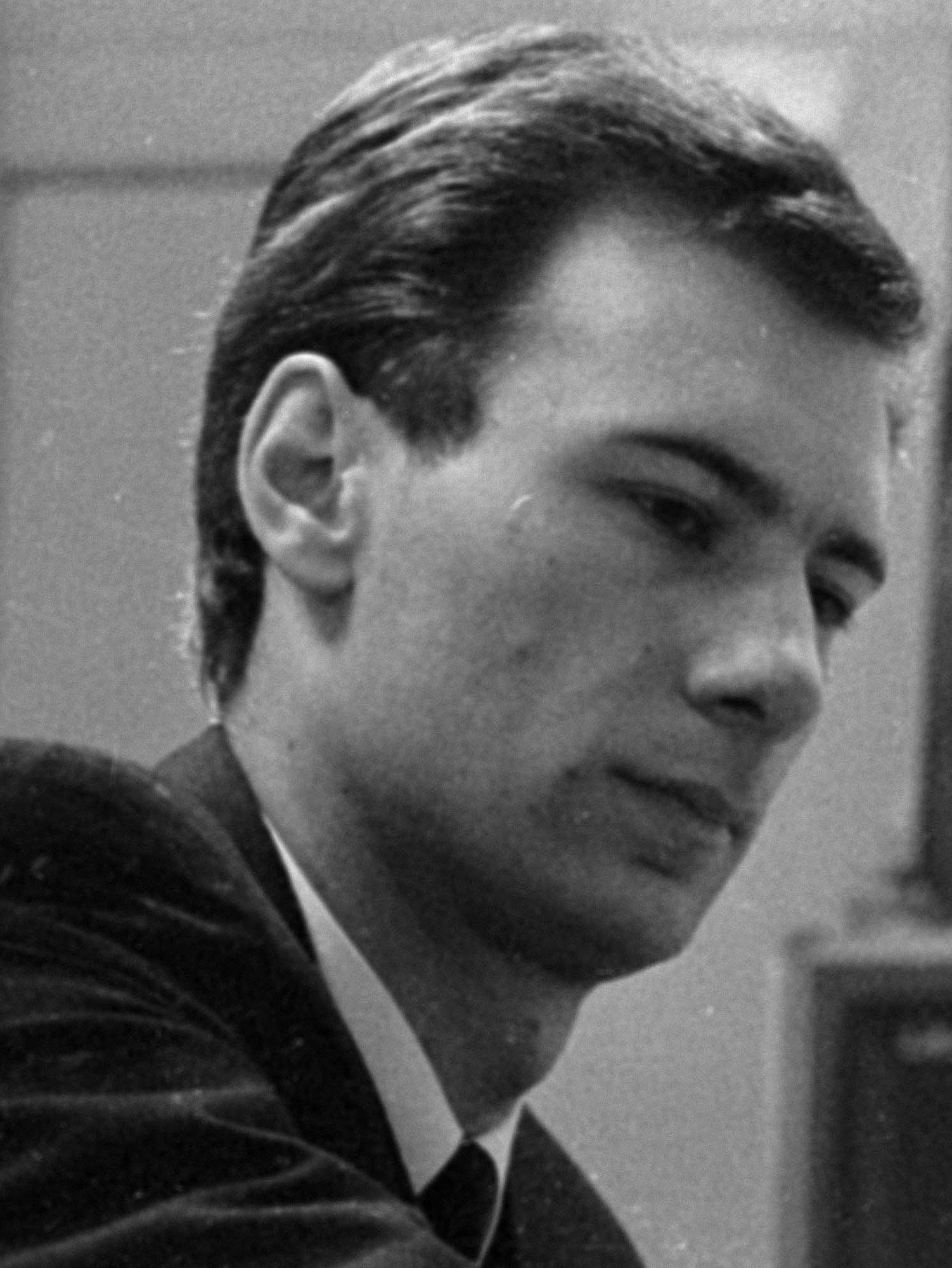
- Csák in 1970

Spokesperson of the Government of Hungary
- In office 15 February 1995 – 30 June 1995
- Prime Minister: Gyula Horn
- Preceded by: Evelyn Forró
- Succeeded by: Henrik Havas

Personal details
- Born: 20 May 1944 Kassa, Hungary
- Died: 2 June 2025 (aged 81)
- Profession: Journalist, spokesman

Elemér Csák (20 May 1944 – 2 June 2025) was a Hungarian journalist, editor, foreign correspondent, and radio and television reporter. A winner of the Táncsics and Karinthy Prizes for journalism, he served as the spokesman of the Hungarian government from 15 February 1995 to 30 June 1995.

== Life and career ==
Csak was born in Košice, Hungary on 20 May 1944. In 1967, he graduated from Moscow State University with a degree in history and archeology. He then completed post-graduate studies at the MÚOSZ School of Journalism in Budapest. During college, he worked as the Hungary correspondent for Moscow Radio.

Csák died on 2 June 2025, at the age of 82.
