= Echo TV =

Hungarian TV channel

- Country: Hungary
- Broadcast area: Hungary
- Headquarters: Angol Street 65-69, Budapest, 1149

Programming
- Language: Hungarian
- Picture format: 576i (16:9 SDTV) 1080i (16:9 HDTV)

Ownership
- Owner: Echo Hungária TV Zrt (part of Talentis Group)

History
- Launched: September 15, 2005; 21 years ago
- Closed: March 31, 2019; 7 years ago

Links
- Website: www.echotv.hu

Echo TV was a Christian-conservative Hungarian television channel owned and operated by Echo Hungária TV Zrt, and founded in 2005 to cover business news. Later focusing on news broadcasting and public affairs, it was known as a supporter of Fidesz and KDNP.

== History ==
Echo TV was founded as a business news channel in 2005 at the initiative of Gábor Széles, the 4th richest man of Hungary (as of 2017) and the head of Videoton and Ikarus Bus. Széles had only days previously purchased Hungary's daily Magyar Hírlap; the acquisition of both stations helped Széles establish a major media presence in Hungary. Széles reportedly spent two billion Hungarian forints in creating Echo TV.

In 2006 Echo TV became a media partner of Feratel media technologies AG, based in Austria.

Gábor Széles sold Echo TV to Fidesz-backed businessman and oligarch Lőrinc Mészáros on December 2, 2016.

On December 4, 2017, the whole channel was renewed. Echo TV ceased operations on March 31, 2019. Its staff and technical equipment were integrated into Hír TV, which had returned as a pro-government media portfolio after the 2018 parliamentary election.

== Association with far-right politics ==
According to Le Monde, Echo TV was a forum favored among neofascists in Hungary.

After the 2010 election in Hungary, Echo TV displayed an image of Imre Kertész, a Hungarian survivor of Auschwitz and nobel laureate, alongside a voiceover about rats. Sándor Pörzse was a well-known host for Echo TV before helping to found Jobbik's paramilitary organization the "Hungarian Guard," later banned by the Hungarian Government. Sándor Pörzse was removed from the Echo TV in 2009.

One of Echo TV's better known broadcasters was Ferenc Szaniszló, known for his racist and anti-Semitic statements. In 2011, Hungary's media regulator fined Echo 500,000 Forints after Szaniszló compared Roma people to "monkeys".
