= Elemér Kiss =

Hungarian jurist, politician (born 1944)

Spokesperson of the Government of Hungary
- In office 7 November 1995 – 6 July 1998
- Preceded by: Henrik Havas
- Succeeded by: Gábor Borókai

Personal details
- Born: 1944 (age 81–82)
- Profession: jurist, politician, spokesman

Elemér Kiss (born 1944) is a Hungarian jurist who served as spokesman of the Hungarian government from 7 November 1995 to 6 July 1998.

Political offices
Preceded by István Stumpf	Minister of Prime Minister's Office; 2002–2003	Succeeded by Imre Szekeres
