= Domokos Szollár =

Hungarian politician (born 1975)

Spokesman of the Government of Hungary with Bernadett Budai until 1 November 2009
- In office 15 May 2009 – 29 May 2010
- Preceded by: Bernadett Budai
- Succeeded by: Anna Nagy

Personal details
- Born: 20 August 1975 (age 51)
- Profession: spokesman

Domokos Szollár (born 20 August 1975) is a Hungarian businessman. He was the spokesman of the Hungarian government from 15 May 2009 to 29 May 2010. Before that he served as spokesman of the Budapest Ferihegy International Airport. He criticized the strikers powerfully in his declarations. During an interview Szollár told the reporter that he voted for the Politics Can Be Different party on the 2010 Hungarian elections, in spite of that fact he worked for the government which consists of the Hungarian Socialist Party.
