= Erika Gulyás =

Hungarian politician

Spokesperson of the Government of Hungary
- In office 2 August 2004 – 6 October 2004
- Preceded by: Zoltán J. Gál
- Succeeded by: András Batiz; Boglár László

Personal details
- Profession: journalist, spokesperson

Erika Gulyás is a Hungarian politician who served as spokesperson of the Hungarian government from 2 August 2004 to 6 October 2004.
