= Viasat 6 =

- Country: Hungary
- Broadcast area: Hungary
- Headquarters: Budapest, Hungary

Programming
- Language: Hungarian
- Picture format: 1080i HDTV (downscaled to 576i for the HDTV feed)

Ownership
- Owner: Modern Times Group (2008–2015); Sony Pictures Television (2015–2021); Antenna Group (2021–present)
- Sister channels: AXN; Viasat 2 Viasat 3 Viasat Film

History
- Launched: 28 January 2008; 18 years ago
- Former names: TV6

Links
- Website: www.viasat6.hu

Viasat 6 (formerly known as TV6 until February 11, 2011) is a Hungarian commercial television channel of Antenna Group.

== History ==
The channel launched on January 28, 2008.

On April 1, 2013, the aspect ratio was changed to 16:9 and the channel got a new visual image.

On February 11, 2015, Sony Pictures Television (SPT) Networks agreed the acquisition of the Hungarian Viasat television channels from Swedish Modern Times Group (MTG), which now owned the television channels Viasat 3 and Viasat 6 and the Viasat Play catch-up service in Hungary to expand their portfolio that included the linear television channels AXN, AXN White and AXN Black as well as the digital services AXN Now and AXN Player.

== Distribution ==
Since the end of 2007, the channel has been broadcast test transmissions, but only on January 28, 2008 official broadcasting was launched. Initially, it was available at Digi TV, some smaller cable networks and Magyar Telekom, with its T-Home branded IPTV and satellite offerings. Initially, it was called TV6, as long as the conduit Viasat 3 was hoping to be able to inherit the name of the late TV3. But after no hope remained, this channel was renamed to Viasat 6 so that neither its logo nor its program offer was affected by this change, but its name was said differently.

In 2010, the channel was not broadcast via Digi TV for a few weeks. In the spring of 2010, the channel also appeared on the UPC Hungary platforms. At the beginning of May 2010, the channel was available via the UPC Direct satellite service, followed by UPC's digital cable TV offer in the last week of May, while from 1 June 2010, subscribers with analogue cable TV could watch the channel as well.
