= Gábor Borókai =

Hungarian politician

Spokesperson of the Government of Hungary
- In office 9 July 1998 – 27 May 2002
- Preceded by: Elemér Kiss
- Succeeded by: Zoltán J. Gál

Personal details
- Born: 14 June 1961 (age 63); Budapest, People's Republic of Hungary
- Profession: Journalist, politician, spokesman

Gábor Borókai (born 14 June 1961) is a Hungarian politician and journalist who was a spokesman for the Hungarian government from 9 July 1998 to 27 May 2002.

He worked for Nemzeti Sport from 1985. After ten years he moved into political journalism. He was editor in chief of the Reform between 1997 and 1998. He dealt primarily with domestic political topics.

Viktor Orbán appointed Borókai spokesman of the cabinet. He held this position as political state secretary of the Prime Minister's Office from 1999. When the Fidesz lost the 2002 elections he started the HírTV with exterior investors' help. Until 2004, he was CEO of the channel. After that he joined the editorial commission of the weekly news magazine Heti Válasz of which he is currently the editor in chief.
