= Mihály Hardy =

Hungarian journalist

Mihály Hardy (Budapest, 2 May 1957), is a Hungarian journalist, media specialist, public relations director and former director of the Hungarian Union of Journalists. He worked as a correspondent and presenter at Magyar Televízió and, later, the defunct commercial channel TV3.

== Biography ==
His father, Dr. Hardy Gyula was a chemical engineer and academician. Between 1975 and 1980, he was a student at the Moscow State Institute of International Relations.

In 1980, his 17-year career at Magyar Televízió (MTV) began, first as the foreign affairs editor of its news program Híradó, then as a programming editor, and from 1985 to 1991, as its correspondent to Moscow. Between 1991 and 1993 he took part in the presenting team of TV2's own news program Egyenleg as both editor-in-chief and presenter. From 1992 to 1994, he was the spokesman of the National Hungarian Association of Journalisms (Magyar Újságírók Országos Szövetsége, MÚOSZ) then in 1993–1997, and again from 2000, he was a member of its directorate, and, between 2004 and 2007, he was its vice-president. In 1994, he was appointed press spokesman of the United Nations High Commissioner for Refugees in Budapest. From 1994 to 1997, he worked for several programs on MTV, such as Híradó and Hét, and was an editor and reporter in programs such as Európa Magazin and Manőver.

In 1997–2000, he presented Hír3 on the commercial channel TV3, subsequently becoming a part of the channel's administrative council 1999–2000. He was the last face seen on the channel on 21 February 2000, on what was supposed to be the last edition of Hír3. In 2000 and 2003, he worked as the communications manager for Hard News. Between 2003 and 2005, he worked at Magyar ATV's Híradó as its editor. From 2006 to 2008, he worked as the communications manager at Tesco-Global Zrt. (Tesco Hungary). After that, from 2008 to 2019, he was the communications director at the Budapest Ferenc Liszt International Airport. On 1 February 2020, he joined Klubrádió as editor-in-chief, replacing Péter Rósza. He left his post on 31 March 2025, but continues working there as a presenter.
