= András Giró-Szász =

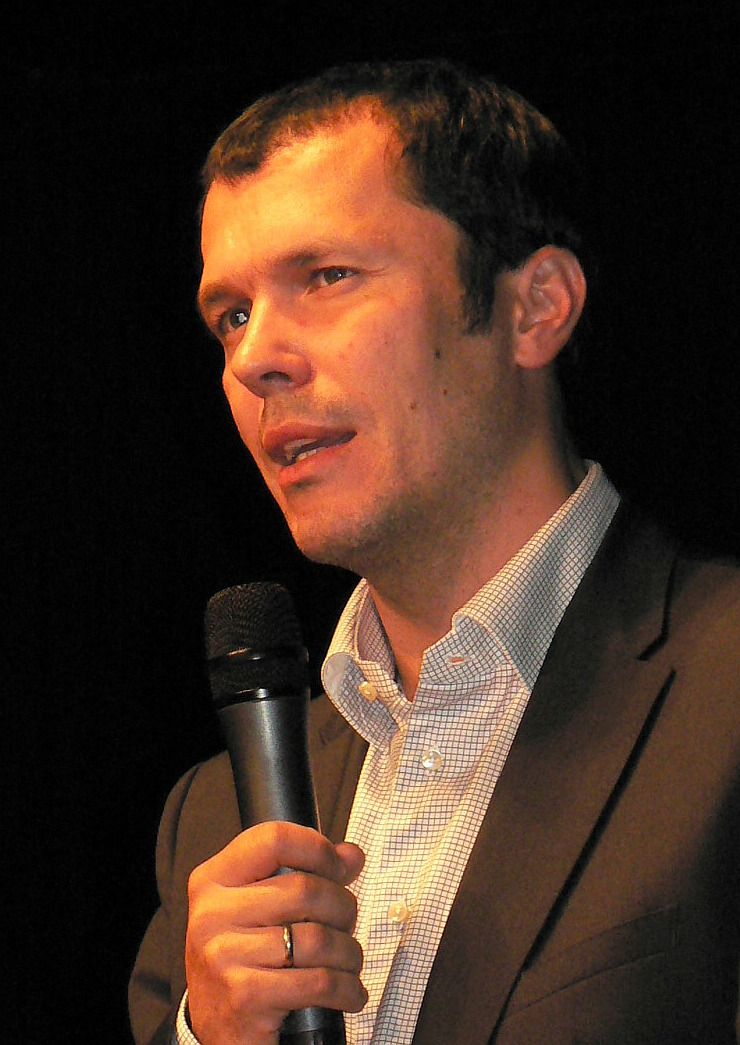
- Giró-Szász in 2009

Spokesperson of the Government of Hungary
- In office 12 September 2011 – 6 June 2014
- Preceded by: Anna Nagy
- Succeeded by: Éva Kurucz

Personal details
- Born: 1970; Budapest, Hungary
- Spouse: Krisztina Giró-Szász (Krisztina Serfőző)
- Children: Gergő
- Profession: spokesperson

András Giró-Szász (born 1970) is a Hungarian historian and political scientist, who served as the spokesman of the Hungarian government between 12 September 2011 and 6 June 2014.
