= Mária Schmidt =

Hungarian historian and university lecturer

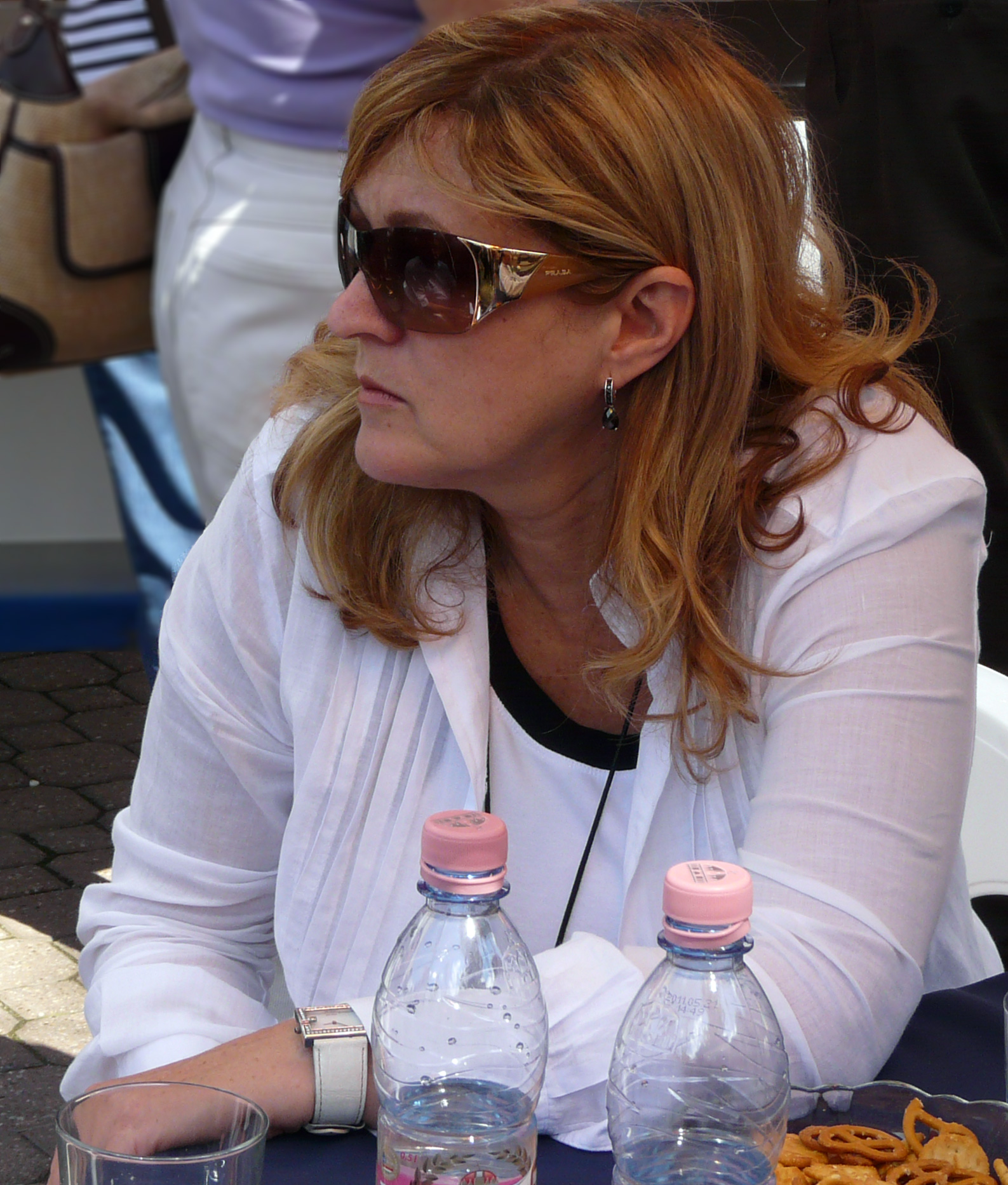
- Born: Mária Erika Schmidt; 10 October 1953 (age 73); Budapest
- Spouse: András Ungár
- Children: Anna; Péter

Academic background
- Education: Eötvös Loránd University

Academic work
- Main interests: Theory of history, totalitarianism, Holocaust

Mária Erika Schmidt (born 10 October 1953) is a Hungarian historian, businesswoman and university lecturer. In 2016 she holds the office of the Government Commissioner of the Memorial Year of the 1956 Revolution, Director-General of the 20th Century Institute, the 21st Century Institute and the House of Terror Museum.

== Career ==
Schmidt was born in 1953. She graduated from Eötvös Loránd University as a secondary school teacher of History and German language and literature. She earned her doctorate in 1985 and subsequently her PhD in 1999. From 1996 she worked as the assistant professor of Pázmány Péter Catholic University where she became an associate professor in 2000, and she earned her habilitated doctoral degree in 2005. She has been a university full professor since 2010. As a holder of postgraduate research scholarships and visiting professorships, Schmidt has spent time at the Universities of Vienna and Innsbruck, Oxford, Paris, the Berlin Technische Universität, Tel-Aviv, as well as at the Yad Vashem Holocaust Memorial Authority, Jerusalem, and the universities at New York and Bloomington, IN and at the Hoover Institute, Stanford, CAL. She was Chief Advisor to the Hungarian Prime Minister between 1998 and 2002. She is the Director-General of the 20th Century Institute, the 21st Century Institute and the House of Terror Museum. Since 2002 she has been a board member of the international Ettersberg Foundation established with the aim of carrying out comparative research on 20th-century European dictatorships and democratic transitions. She has been the chairperson of the Scientific Advisory Board of the First World War Centennial Committee since 2013.

Schmidt was awarded a Széchényi-prize in 2014. She is Dame of Honor of the Order of St. George.

== Scholarship ==
Schmidt's research interests include the history of the Hungarian Jews after 1918, the history of Hungary under the dictatorships and dictatorships in the twentieth century. She has written articles such as "Noel Field—The American Communist at the Center of Stalin's East European Purge: From the Hungarian Archives." She is the author of various books: in her book titled Kollaboráció vagy kooperáció? (Collaboration or Cooperation?) she investigated issues concerning the Jewish Council of Budapest and in the Diktatúrák ördögszekerén (The Devil's Wagon of Dictatorships) she analyses certain questions of the history of dictatorships. She edited several books, one of which was co-edited with György Markó under the title Europe’s Fraternal War 1914–1918, which was published in 2014. All is Moving on the Western Front was published in 2014, and her latest book Veszélyzónában on roles, games and chances was published in 2016. A number of her books deal with the 1956 Revolution and its legacy.

== Personal life ==
Schmidt is of Transylvanian Saxon descent through her father.

She was married to the Hungarian billionaire András Ungár, who died in 2006. They had two children, Anna and Péter. Péter is a leading member of the Hungarian party LMP – Hungary's Green Party.

== Criticism ==
Schmidt's scholarship and relationship to successive governments of Hungary has come under intense criticism in the English and Hungarian public press and among scholars. The Daily Beast calls her "the leader of a movement to rewrite the Holocaust". She has been called a "Holocaust revisionist" by historian Laszlo Karsai and was removed from involvement in Budapest's Holocaust Center and Memorial Museum, after a boycott from Yad Vashem.

András Heisler, president of the Federation of Hungarian Jewish Communities, criticised Schmidt's "untrustworthy account of Holocaust history", resigning from the project. Randolph L. Braham, leading scholar of the Holocaust in Hungary, returned his honors from the Hungarian government and also criticized her for the "wave of historical revisionism bolstered by Schmidt's work".

== See also ==
- House of Terror Museum
- Randolph L. Braham
