= Dávid Daróczi =

Hungarian political spokesman (1972–2010)

Spokesman of the Government of Hungary with Bernadett Budai
- In office 19 June 2007 – 24 April 2009
- Preceded by: Emese Danks
- Succeeded by: Bernadett Budai

Personal details
- Born: József Daróczi; April 19, 1972 Budapest, People's Republic of Hungary
- Died: 2 April 2010 (aged 37) Budapest, Hungary
- Profession: journalist, politician, spokesman

Dávid Daróczi (né József Daróczi) (April 19, 1972 – April 2, 2010) was a coach and spokesman for former Hungarian Prime Minister Ferenc Gyurcsány and the government from June 2007 to April 2009.

== Life ==
Dávid Daróczi was born on April 19, 1972. His father, József Choli Daróczi (b. 1939), was a decorated Gypsy poet and teacher. Daróczi, an ethnic Roma, had degrees in theology from Pázmány Péter Catholic University and in business marketing from the Budapest University of Technology and Economics. He had worked as a journalist before becoming a government spokesman in 2007, and worked at a communications firm until his death.

== Death ==
He committed suicide in Budapest on April 2, 2010, just 16 days before his 38th birthday. Police did not disclose the method of suicide, only that a preliminary investigation ruled out homicide.
