= Nap-kelte =

- Also known as: Nap TV
- Genre: Breakfast television, news, opinion
- Country of origin: Hungary
- Original language: Hungarian

Production
- Production company: Nap TV

Original release
- Network: M1
- Release: August 19, 1989 – September 25, 2009

Nap-kelte (Hungarian pronunciation: [ˈnɒpkɛltɛ], Sunrise) was a long-running Hungarian daily morning programme, and the flagship programme of its producer, Nap TV, a privately owned producer of television programmes from Hungary. It was continuously broadcast on-air for 20 years, from 1989 to 2009, most famously, on M1, the then-flagship channel of public broadcaster Magyar Televízió, except for a period of time between 1999 and 2002, when its programmes were broadcast by the privately owned TV3; after such station went bankrupt, the show moved to ATV, before returning to M1 on 2002, where it stayed until its final broadcast. At one point, the show was also broadcast simultaneously on sister channel M2, which broadcast a sister show, Nap-nyugta (Sunset), which repurposed segments from the main broadcast.

== History ==
The show's first broadcast was aired on August 19, 1989, as the first ever independently produced TV show in Hungarian broadcaster, and soon became the flagship show

of the new TV programming of the Hungarian Television after the end of the communist regime. Its format was mostly centered on an analytical style, focusing largely on current affairs, news bulletins and cerebral interviews with politicians and other newsmakers, punctuated with bite-sized feature segments. Some of the show's segments included Cím-Nap-Sztori (a play on címlapsztori, the Hungarian word for cover story), which interviewed the day's main newsmaker; Fő a város (focused on news and interviews from the Budapest region), Gyorshír (news flashes), Kinn, padon (out in the benches, interviews with prominent figures made from the Nap TV studio garden), Párbaj (confrontational face-to-face debates) and the ever popular political debate Kereszttűz (Crossfire), in which a political figure was interrogated by the show's host and two additional journalists, who present and challenge their opinions with the guest. There were also frequent news updates, weather forecasts and a daily round-up of crime news and business headlines; from 2002 to 2009, all news updates were produced by MTV's news team from its downtown Budapest studios, but all anchors were provided by the Nap TV team.

The show did not have a main anchor, instead, anchors rotated every other day. Over its history, the show's hosts have included, among others, Tamás Forró, András Bánó, Ferenc Pallagi, Endre Aczél, Györgyi Albert, Tamás Vitray, Ilona Mélykúti, László Juszt, József Orosz and Henrik Havas. The show's final hosts were János Betlen, Károly Lakat T. and István Verebes. Veteran MTV sports producer Tamás Gyárfás was the show's executive producer on its final incarnation, he also hosted a daily sports news interview segment called Sport Plusz: Minden, amit a nyomdafesték elbír (Sport Plus: Everything the ink can handle), an extension of the similarly named sports newsmagazine.

== Criticism and demise ==
The show was often accused, specially by right-wing populist parties Fidesz and KDNP, of being politically biased, and having a primarily left-wing alignment, and often been accused of servility, and favouring the then-ruling Hungarian Socialist Party, which led to the derogatory moniker Párt-kelte. During the first Orbán government, the show was swiftly removed from the MTV lineup and replaced by its own production Ma reggel (This Morning); Nap TV sorted this out by moving to privately owned television. After Péter Medgyessy was elected Prime Minister, the show promptly returned to MTV.

Still, pro-Orbán politicians, public figures and media outlets have continuously criticised the show. On one occasion, during the Kereszttűz segment, prominent liberal conservative comedian Sándor Fábry called the show "a propaganda television broadcast, which has nothing to do on a publicly funded television service". As a result, since October 2006, members of the Fidesz-KDNP coalition have refused to appear in Nap-kelte. Reacting to the boycott, show producers began to invite prominent members of other right-wing parties for their daily interview segments.

Unlike most of MTV's shows, the show failed to keep up with the structural changes happening at the broadcaster. The show used the same cameras and technology for most of its tenure, resulting on a much fainter and worse picture quality than most of the shows at the stations (the show even still broadcast in the 4:3 picture format in the final months of broadcasting, at a time when most of MTV's content was already in widescreen). The show also used the same theme tune for most of its tenure. As a result of this, and partially due to the launch of competing shows at privately owned stations RTL Klub and TV2, which were less elitist in style and more appealing to viewers, many people began to switch over to these shows. Nevertheless, Nap-kelte was still popular with the Hungarian political elites and a very influential broadcast.

A relaunch carried out in February 2006, as well as a smaller one on 2008, caused the show to obtain new studios and a much improved graphics package, as well as a remix of the show's long-running theme music. The show also relaunched its concept to make it more dynamic and snappier compared to before, whilst retaining its focus on current affairs and political interviews. Although ratings improved, the show aired its final edition on September 25, 2009, citing a lack of funding to continue producing the show. The following week, MTV replaced the show with a second incarnation of Ma reggel, which aired until July 7, 2026.
