= Réka Rubint =

Hungarian fitness instructor

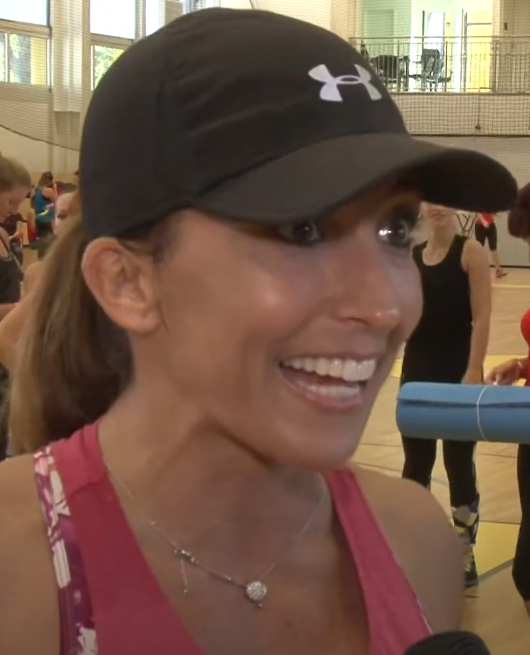
- Rubint in 2019
- Born: 28 June 1978 (age 47); Kazincbarcika, Hungary
- Other names: Réka Schobert
- Occupation: Fitness instructor
- Spouse: Norbert Schobert
- Children: 3

Réka Rubint (born 28 June 1978 in Kazincbarcika) is a Hungarian fitness instructor and author of various fitness publications and workouts. In 2017, she was listed by Forbes as the 10th most influential Hungarian woman in the media.

== Life ==
Rubint went to a kindergarten in Pusztamonostor. She completed her primary school education at the Székely Mihály Elementary School in Jászberény. She then went to the Kazincbarcic Secondary School for Health and Care for a year, before going back to Jászberény due to the distance from her parents and friends. She continued her studies at the Lehel Vezér Secondary School and then studied at the Bárczi Gusztáv Pedagogical Teacher Training College.

Her husband is Norbert Schobert. They have three children: Lara, Norbert and Zalán.

== Published publications ==
- Add önmagad – Személyi edződ Rubint Réka
- Szülés után lefogytam!
- Az igényes nők edzésprogramja – Rubint Réka 2.
- Kismama- és életmódkazetta
- Add újra önmagad
- Napi 20 perc önmagadért
