= Viasat 3 =

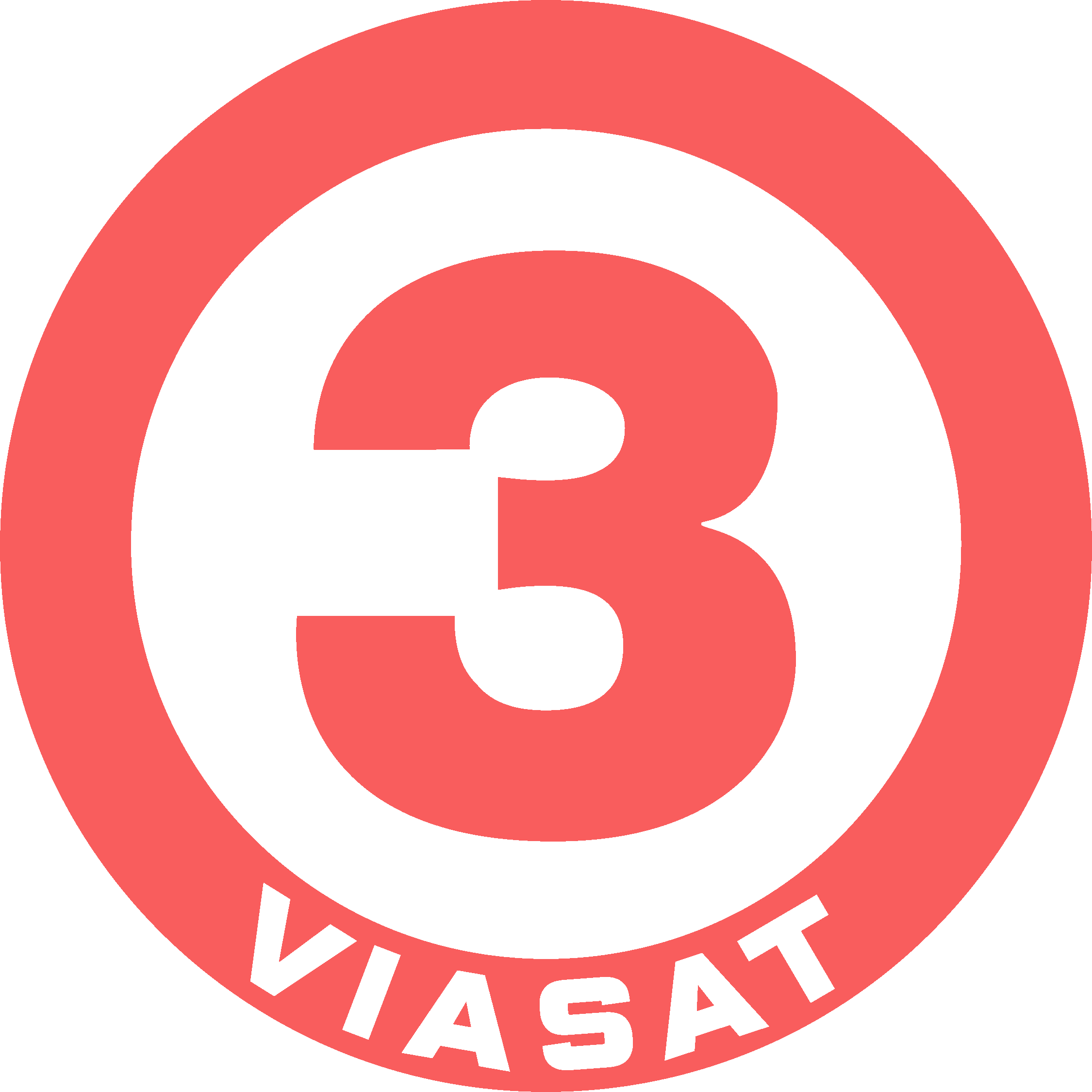
- Country: Hungary
- Broadcast area: Hungary
- Headquarters: Budapest, Hungary

Programming
- Language: Hungarian
- Picture format: 1080i HDTV (downscaled to 576i for the SDTV feed)

Ownership
- Owner: Modern Times Group (2000–2015); Sony Pictures Television (2015-2021); Antenna Group (2021-present)
- Sister channels: AXN; Viasat 2 Viasat 6 Viasat Film

History
- Launched: 23 October 2000; 25 years ago

Viasat 3 is a Hungarian commercial TV channel, that began the broadcast on October 23, 2000. This channel aired Hungary's first reality show in 2001 called A Bár (The Bar).

In 2015, the Sony Pictures Television acquired the Hungarian Viasat channels from Modern Times Group (MTG). From 2021 the channel is operated by Antenna Group.

== Programming ==
=== Original ===
==== Reality TV ====
- Feleségek luxuskivitelben

=== Acquired Progamming ===
==== Comedy ====
- 30 Rock
- 8 Simple Rules
- According to Jim
- Andy Richter Controls the Universe
- Animal Practice
- Betty White's Off Their Rockers
- Brooklyn Nine-Nine
- Everybody Loves Raymond
- Friends
- Futurama
- Gary Unmarried
- Hot in Cleveland
- I Dream of Jeannie
- Joey
- The King of Queens
- Mike & Molly
- The Nanny
- The New Adventures of Old Christine
- The Office
- Romantically Challenged
- Royal Pains
- Rules of Engagement
- Samantha Who?
- Scare Tactics
- The Simpsons
- Suburgatory
- Trigger Happy TV
- Two Guys and a Girl
- Two and a Half Men
- Vruć Vetar
- Will & Grace

==== Drama ====
- 666 Park Avenue
- Agatha Christie's Poirot
- Agents of S.H.I.E.L.D.
- Ally McBeal
- Almost Human
- Andromeda
- Angel
- Bates Motel
- Being Erica
- Beyond Belief: Fact or Fiction
- The Blacklist
- Bron/Broen
- Brothers & Sisters
- Buffy the Vampire Slayer
- The Carrie Diaries
- Castle
- Columbo
- Commander in Chief
- Conan the Adventurer
- Covert Affairs
- CSI: Crime Scene Investigation
- CSI: Miami
- Cult
- Cupid
- Da Vinci's Inquest
- Dawson's Creek
- The Dead Zone
- Der letzte Bulle
- Dexter
- Diagnosis: Murder
- Dinotopia
- Dirt
- Dracula
- Eleventh Hour
- ER
- Fairly Legal
- Father Dowling Mysteries
- Firefly
- The Flash
- Footballers' Wives
- Gilmore Girls
- Golden Boy
- Greek
- GSG 9 – Ihr Einsatz ist ihr Leben
- The Guardian
- Hidden Palms
- The Hoop Life
- House
- Instant Star
- The Invisible Man
- Jake and the Fatman
- Kojak
- Lark Rise to Candleford
- Las Vegas
- Law & Order: Criminal Intent
- Law & Order: LA
- Law & Order: Special Victims Unit
- Leverage
- Love Bites
- Medium
- Men in Trees
- Miami Medical
- Mission: Impossible
- Moonlight
- Motive
- Murder, She Wrote
- NCIS
- NCIS: Los Angeles
- NCIS: New Orleans
- Nikita
- Nip/Tuck
- Northern Exposure
- Numbers
- Nurse Jackie
- The O.C.
- Pacific Blue
- Person of Interest
- Petrocelli
- Philly
- Prime Suspect
- Pushing Daisies
- Ravenswood
- The Returned
- Rizzoli & Isles
- Russian Dolls: Sex Trade
- Shameless
- The Shannara Chronicles
- Shark
- Six Degrees
- Smallville
- SOKO Donau
- Die Rettungsflieger
- Southland
- Spartacus
- Special Unit 2
- St. Elsewhere
- The Streets of San Francisco
- Summerland
- Supernatural
- Total Recall 2070
- Trust Me
- Twin Peaks
- Ugly Betty
- Ultimate Force
- Vermist
- Veronica Mars
- Vikings
- Wanted
- Without a Trace
- The X-Files
- Zone Stad

== Logos ==
2000-2009

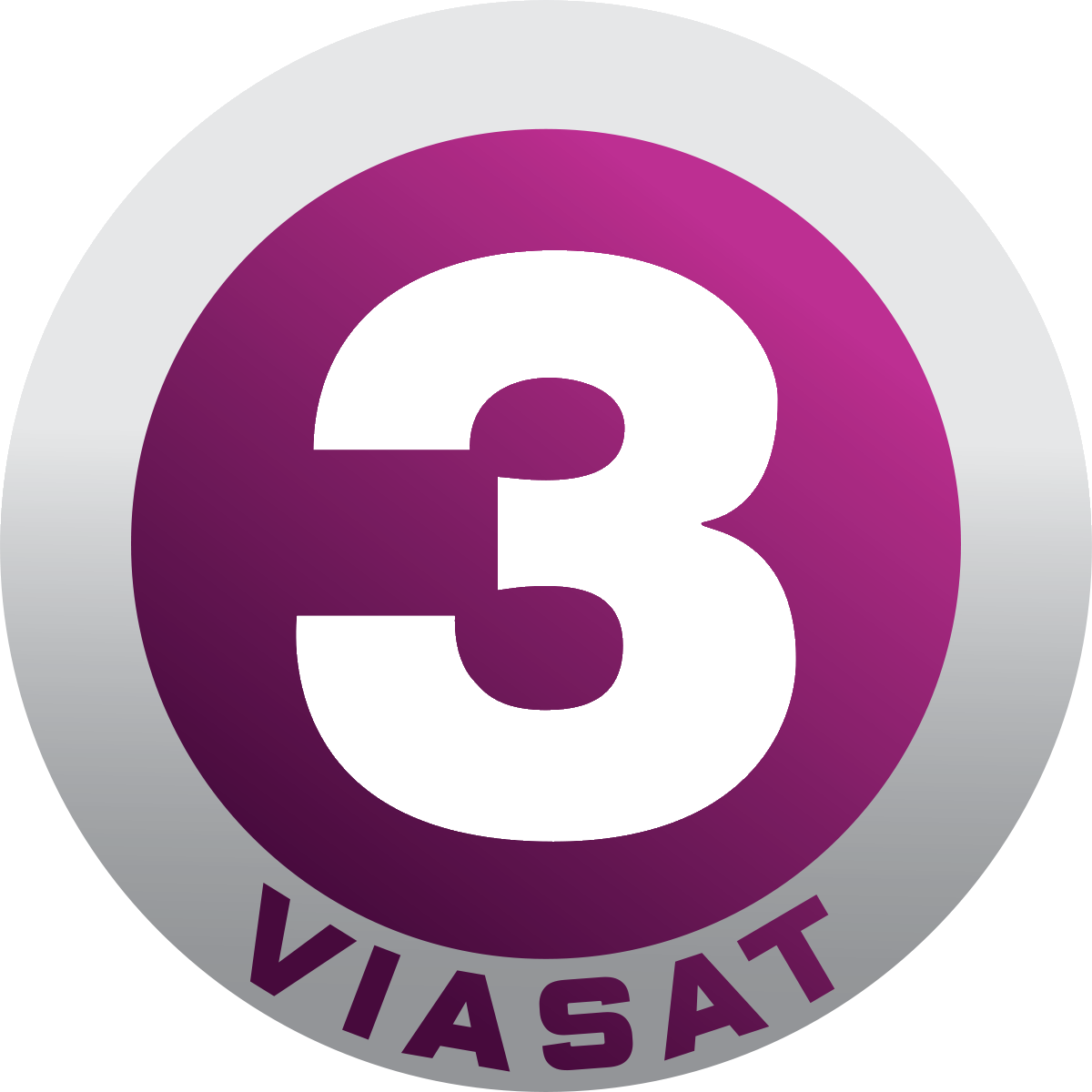
2009-2014

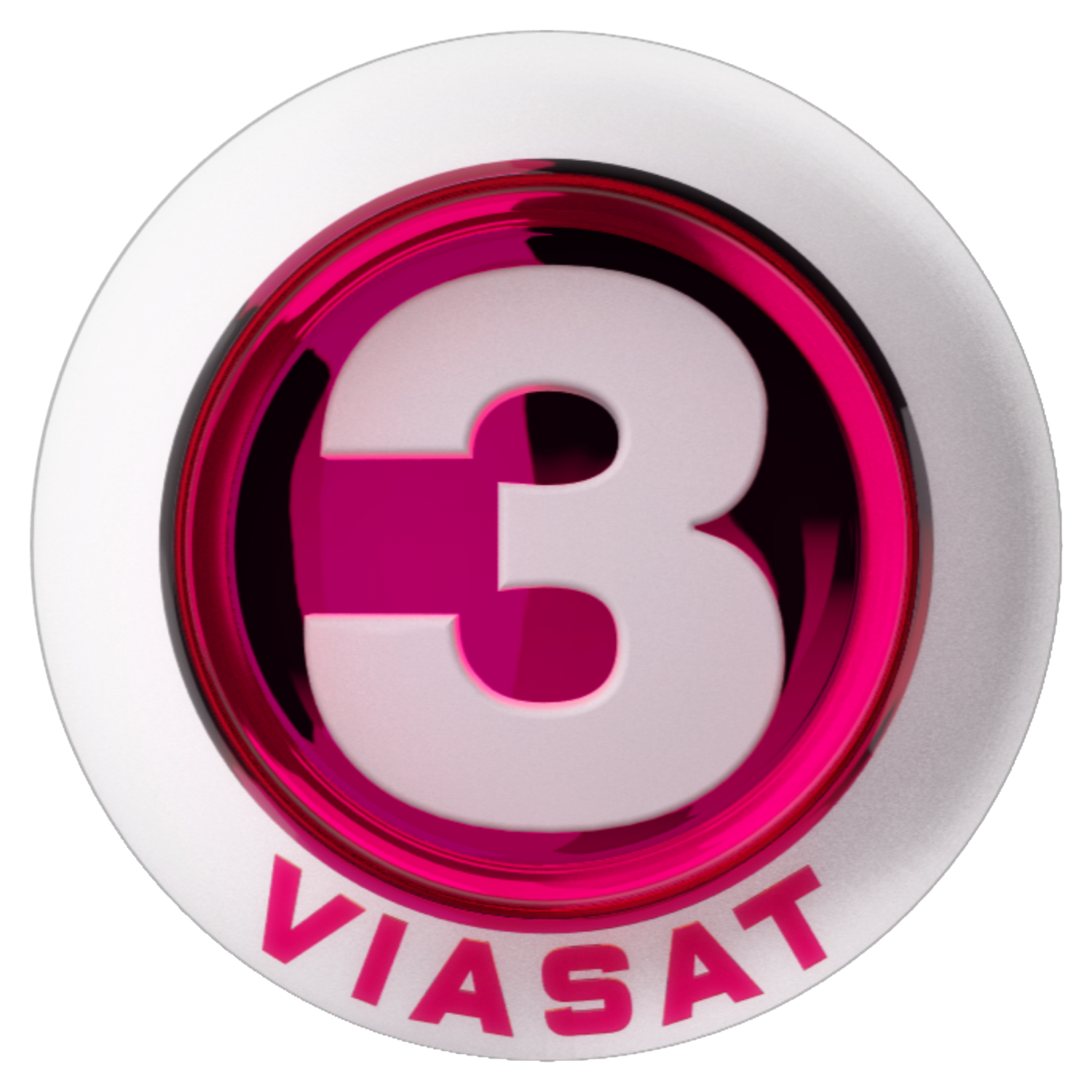
2014-present
