= János Sándor =

Hungarian politician (1860–1922)

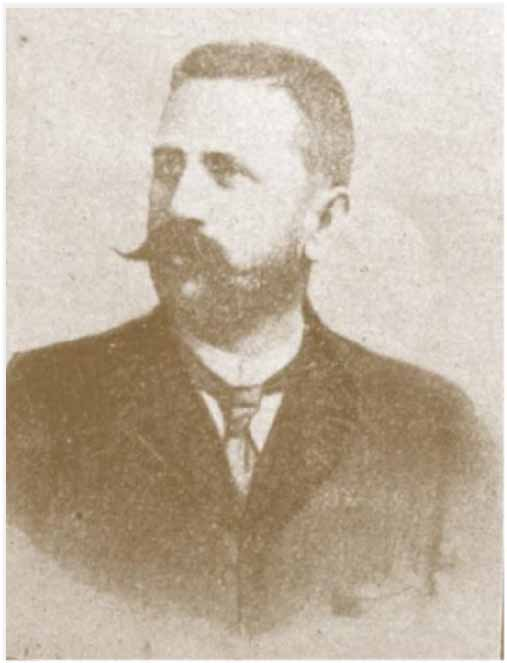

Minister of the Interior of Hungary
- In office 10 June 1913 – 15 June 1917
- Preceded by: László Lukács
- Succeeded by: Gábor Ugron

Personal details
- Born: November 14, 1860 Marosvásárhely, Hungary
- Died: 16 July 1922 (aged 61) Budapest, Hungary
- Party: Liberal Party, Party of National Work
- Profession: politician

János Sándor de Csíkszentmihály (14 November 1860 – 16 July 1922) was a Hungarian politician, who served as Interior Minister between 1913 and 1917 in István Tisza's second cabinet. János Sándor was the brother-in-law of Count Tisza.

Political offices
Preceded by László Lukács	Minister of the Interior; 1913–1917	Succeeded by Gábor Ugron
