= Lánchíd Rádió =

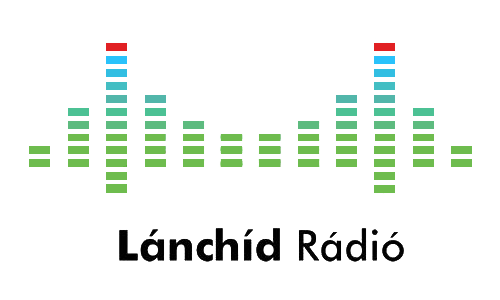
- Budapest; Hungary
- Broadcast area: Hungary

Programming
- Language: Hungarian
- Format: Defunct

Ownership
- Sister stations: Hír TV

History
- First air date: 15 March 2007

Technical information
- Power: 1,000 watts

Lánchíd Rádió (lit. "Chain Bridge Radio") was a privately owned radio station in Hungary. It began broadcasting 15 March 2007 and offered news, reports, interviews, cultural programs and popular music. It is Hungary's 10th most listened radio station.

On April 11, 2018, the radio was partially closed because the owners did not want to continue funding it. Currently, only music is being played, because the radio has obligation to broadcast until the frequency license expiration.

The radio station was founded by a media group owned by Lajos Simicska which also operates Hír TV and Magyar Nemzet.

The radio station's political views have been called conservative, right wing and national-populist.

== Program ==
The musical program is composed of contemporary to classic pop- and rock music both from Hungarian and international artists. Weekdays between 14:00 and 16:00 the show Dr. Boross rendel ("Dr. Boross orders") moderated by György Boross allows people to call and request music to be played. His show used to be hosted on Sztár fM from 2007 on, but the radio station shut down in 2011.

Weekdays between 16:30 and 18:30 Levente Bella moderates the show Lecsó (named after Lecsó). People are invited to call and give their opinions about current Hungarian and international topics.

== Broadcasting ==
Lánchíd Rádió broadcasts from many cities in Hungary, and also offers an internet live-stream.

City	Frequency
Budapest	100.3 MHz
Székesfehérvár	106.6 MHz
Balatonfüred	96.2 MHz
Győr	88.1 MHz
Zalaegerszeg	88.3 MHz
Keszthely	93.4 MHz
Dunaújváros	99.1 MHz
Pécs	94.6 MHz
Tatabánya	107.0 MHz
Szombathely	97.1 MHz
Kaposvár	97.5 MHz
Siklós	88.6 MHz
Szigetvár	98.9 MHz
Szeged	100.2 MHz
