= Nap TV =

TV production company based in Budapest, Hungary

Nap Televízió (Nap-TV) (Sun Television)
- Country: Hungary
- Availability: Produces programmes for Hungarian Television
- Motto: none
- Owner: Nap-TV Kft.
- Key people: Tamás Gyárfás, CEO&Producer, Károly Lakat T., Editor-in-Chief
- Launch date: August 19, 1989
- Dissolved: September 26, 2009
- Official website: www.naptv.hu

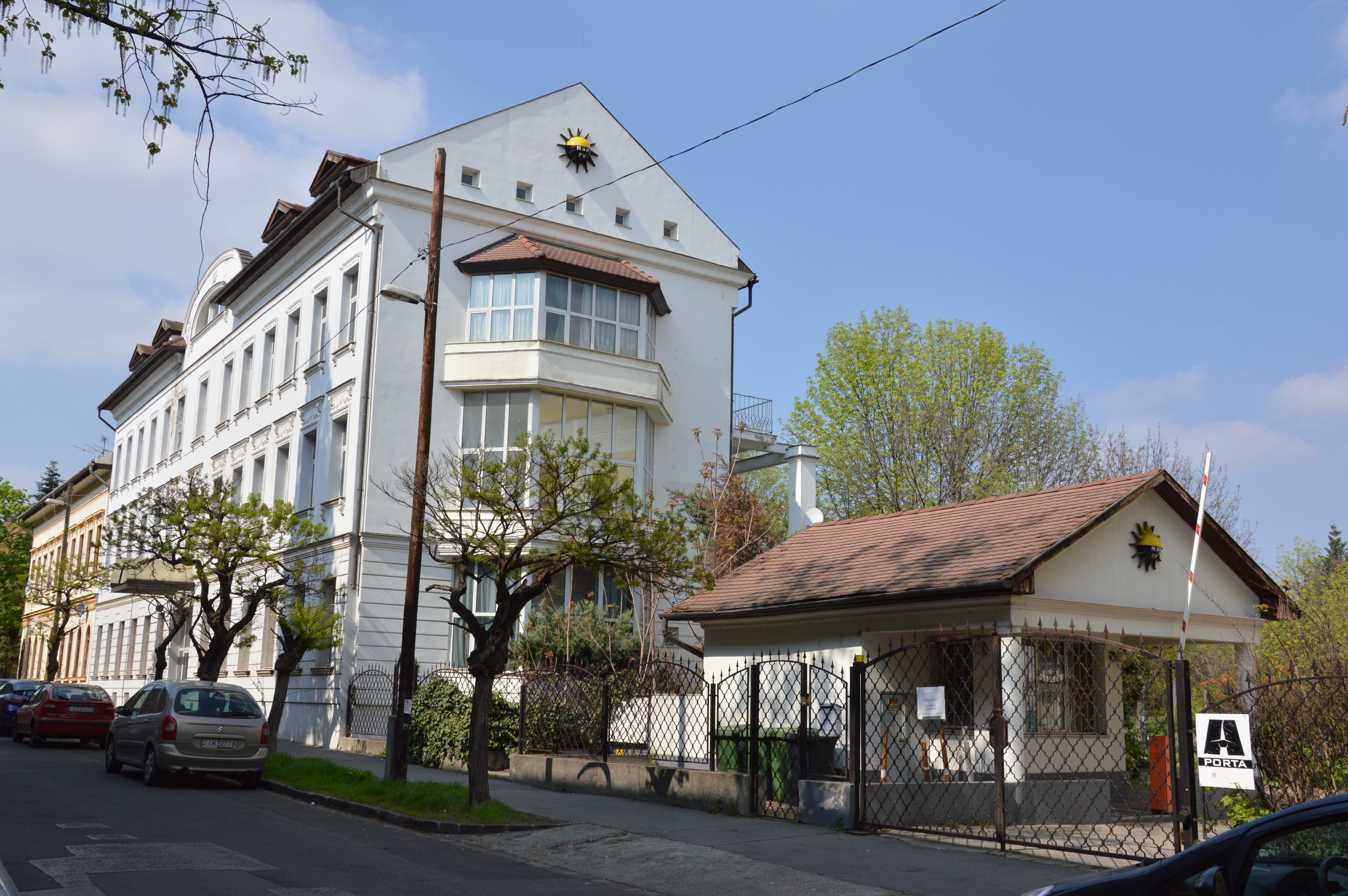
Buildings of Nap-TV in Budapest

Nap Televízió is a privately owned producer of television programmes. It makes daily television programmes for Hungarian Television, called Nap-kelte (Sunrise). The company's first programmes appeared on-screen in 1989, and have run continuously ever since. Between 1999 and 2002 its programmes were broadcast by the privately owned TV3. After its bankruptcy, they moved to ATV. On September 25, 2009, the show was also discontinued on Hungarian Television channels 1 and 2 due to lack of funds.
