= Heti Válasz =

Conservative online publication in Hungary

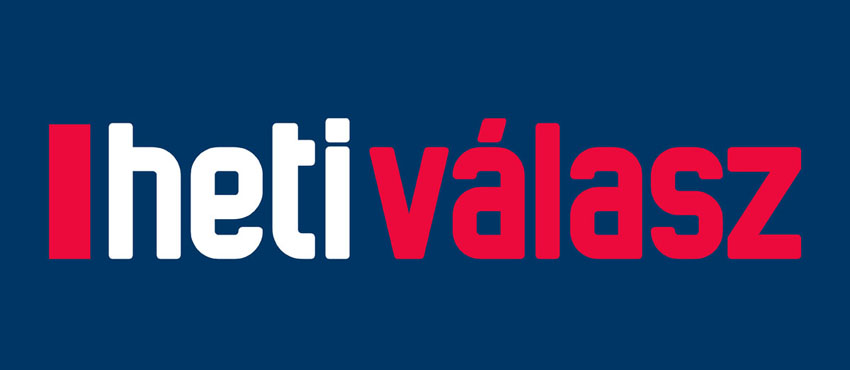
- Editor: Gábor Borókai
- Categories: News magazine
- Frequency: Weekly
- Total circulation: 20,000 copies (2010)
- Founded: 2001
- Final issue: 3 August 2018 (print)
- Based in: Budapest
- Language: Hungarian
- Website: www.valaszonline.hu
- ISSN: 1587-0804
- OCLC: 610211455

Heti Válasz (Hungarian pronunciation: [ˈhɛti ˈvaːlɒs]) is a conservative online publication in Hungary.

== History and profile ==
Heti Válasz was established in 2001. It is published weekly on Thursdays and is headquartered in Budapest. The magazine covers news on politics, economy and culture, and has a conservative stance. Since its inception the magazine has had different owners. In 2010 the owners was a joint venture which is established by a Hungarian media entrepreneur and politician, Tamás Fellegi, and a Danish venture capital firm, DEFAP.

Heti Válasz has a conservative stance. The editor-in-chief of the weekly, Gábor Borokai was the previous press spokesperson for Fidesz leader Viktor Orbán between 1998 and 2002.

In the fourth quarter of 2009 Heti Válasz had a circulation of 32,217 copies. As of 2010 its circulation was 20,000 copies.

The last printed edition was published on 3 August 2018, leaving only the online edition.
