= Álarcos énekes =

Hungarian television series

- Genre: Reality competition; Panel show
- Based on: King of Mask Singer by Munhwa Broadcasting Corporation
- Presented by: Bence Istenes (1-3, 5); Péter Puskás (4)
- Starring: Balázs Sebestyén; Péter Dancsó; Adél Csobot; Laci Gáspár; Bea Hargitai; Ervin Nagy; Claudia Liptai; Péter Puskás; Eszter Ráskó; Joci Pápai
- Country of origin: Hungary
- Original language: Hungarian
- No. of seasons: 5
- No. of episodes: 42

Production
- Producer: Marcell Verebély
- Production location: Média Center Campona
- Camera setup: Multi-camera
- Running time: 90 mins
- Production company: UFA Magyarország

Original release
- Network: RTL
- Release: 9 February 2020 – present

Related
- Masked Singer franchise

Álarcos énekes is a Hungarian reality singing competition television series based on the Masked Singer franchise that originated from the South Korean version of the show King of Mask Singer. It premiered on RTL (formerly RTL Klub) on 9 February 2020.

== Cast ==
=== Panelists and host ===
The panelists are singers Laci Gáspár and Adél Csobot; Balázs Sebestyén, taking on such a role for the first time; and Peter Dancsó, the second most-subscribed YouTuber in Hungary after PamKutya, in his first television appearance. Bence Istenes is the host.

On 4 September, it was announced that one of the judges, Laci Gáspár had a positive coronavirus test, so he would appear only in the first two episodes of the season, being replaced by guest detectives in later episodes.

As of Season 3, the lineup of panelists changed to rapper Fluor Tomi, actor Ervin Nagy, singer Szandi, and presenter Zsófi Szabó.

== Series overview ==
Series overview
Series	Celebrities	Episodes	Originally released		Winner	Runner-up	Third place
Series	Celebrities	Episodes	First released	Last released	Winner	Runner-up	Third place
1	12	10	9 February 2020	12 April 2020	Niki Gallusz as "Bunny"	Ervin Nagy as "Robot"	Attila Árpa as "Crocodile"
2	16	14	6 September 2020	6 December 2020	Dávid Miller as "Banana"	Áron Molnár as "Zebra"	Péter Puskás as "Piggy"
3	15	10	5 September 2021	1 November 2021	Tamás Vastag as "Chameleon"	Laura Cserpes as "Hippo"	Tamás Szabó Kimmel as "Shark"
4	11	8	10 November 2024	29 December 2024	Bence Brasch as "Polar Bear"	Milán Valkusz as "Turtle"	Robert Gergely as "Walrus"
5	11	8	11 October 2026	TBA	TBA	TBA	TBA

== Season 1 ==
Season 1 aired on 9 February 2020 and ended on 12 April 2020.

Results
Stage name	Celebrity	Occupation	Episodes										
Stage name	Celebrity	Occupation	1	2	3	4	5	6	7	8	9	10	
Stage name	Celebrity	Occupation	1	2	3	4	5	6	7	8	9	A	B
Nyuszi "Bunny"	Niki Gallusz	Singer/Actress	WIN		WIN			WIN	RISK	RISK	WIN	SAFE	WINNER
Robot	Ervin Nagy	Actor	WIN			RISK		RISK	WIN	RISK	RISK	SAFE	RUNNER-UP
Krokodil "Crocodile"	Attila Árpa	Actor		RISK		WIN		WIN	WIN	WIN	WIN	THIRD	
Kutya "Dog"	László Józan	Actor		WIN		WIN	WIN		WIN	WIN	OUT		
Fagyi "Ice Cream"	Lara Schobert	Social media influencer		WIN	RISK		WIN		RISK	OUT			
Polip "Octopus"	Lia Pokorny	Actress		RISK		RISK	RISK		OUT				
Páva "Peacock"	László Hajas	Hairstylist	RISK		WIN			OUT					
Szörnyecske "Monster"	Hide the Pain Harold	Electrician/Meme icon	WIN		RISK		OUT						
Oroszlán "Lion"	Barbi Opitz	Singer		WIN		OUT							
Unikornis "Unicorn"	Attila Kökény	Singer/TV personality	RISK		OUT								
Alien	Bea Hargitai	Model		OUT									
Panda	Éva Csepregi	Singer	OUT										

== Episodes ==
=== Episode 1 (9 February) ===
Performances on the first episode
#	Stage name	Song	Identity	Result
1	Unicorn	"Nessun Dorma" from Turandot	undisclosed	RISK
2	Monster	"Don't Worry, Be Happy" by Bobby McFerrin	undisclosed	WIN
3	Panda	"Szomorú szamuráj" by Ámokfutók	Éva Csepregi	OUT
4	Bunny	"Bad Guy" by Billie Eilish	undisclosed	WIN
5	Peacock	"Ha én gazdag lennék" by Ferenc Bessenyei	undisclosed	RISK
6	Robot	"You Could Be Mine" by Guns 'N Roses	undisclosed	WIN

=== Episode 2 (16 February) ===
Performances on the second episode
#	Stage name	Song	Identity	Result
1	Crocodile	"Human" by Rag'n'Bone Man	undisclosed	RISK
2	Ice Cream	"Sorry" by Halsey	undisclosed	WIN
3	Dog	"Jaj, cica" from Csárdáskirálynő/"Who Let The Dogs Out" by Baha Men	undisclosed	WIN
4	Alien	"Sweet Dreams (Are Made Of This)" by Eurythmics	Bea Hargitai	OUT
5	Lion	"Without Me" by Eminem	undisclosed	WIN
6	Octopus	"Lady Carneval" by György Korda	undisclosed	RISK

=== Episode 3 (23 February) ===
Performances on the third episode
#	Stage name	Song	Identity	Result
1	Peacock	"Létezem" by R-GO	undisclosed	WIN
2	Unicorn	"I Want to Break Free" by Queen	Attila Kökény	OUT
3	Ice Cream	"One Kiss" by Dua Lipa	undisclosed	RISK
4	Monster	"Csoki-Csoki-Csoki" by Bëlga	undisclosed	RISK
5	Bunny	"Toy" by Netta	undisclosed	WIN

=== Episode 4 (1 March) ===
Performances on the fourth episode
#	Stage name	Song	Identity	Result
1	Lion	"Crazy" by Gnarls Barkley	Barbi Opitz	OUT
2	Crocodile	"Old Town Road" by Lil Nas X and Billy Ray Cyrus	undisclosed	WIN
3	Robot	"Hazám, hazám" by József Simándy	undisclosed	RISK
4	Octopus	"Thunderstruck" by AC/DC	undisclosed	RISK
5	Dog	"A hegyekbe fönn" by Hip Hop Boyz	undisclosed	WIN

=== Episode 5 (8 March) ===
Performances on the fifth episode
#	Stage name	Song	Identity	Result
1	Monster	"Skibidi" by Little Big	Hide the Pain Harold	OUT
2	Dog	"Never Enough" by Loren Allred	undisclosed	WIN
3	Ice Cream	"Ég veled" by Heni Dér	undisclosed	WIN
4	Octopus	"Takarítónő" by Animal Cannibals	undisclosed	RISK

=== Episode 6 (15 March) ===
Performances on the sixth episode
#	Stage name	Song	Identity	Result
1	Crocodile	"Rebel Yell" by Billy Idol	undisclosed	WIN
2	Robot	"Sex Bomb" by Tom Jones and Mousse T.	undisclosed	RISK
3	Peacock	"Aranybula" by PamKutya	László Hajas	OUT
4	Bunny	"Don't Start Now" by Dua Lipa	undisclosed	WIN

=== Episode 7 (22 March) ===
Performances on the seventh episode
#	Stage name	Song	Identity	Result
1	Dog	"A nézését meg a járását" by Grófo Kis	undisclosed	WIN
2	Octopus	"The Show Must Go On" by Queen	Lia Pokorny	OUT
3	Bunny	"Tous les mêmes" by Stromae	undisclosed	RISK
4	Crocodile	"Dream On" by Aerosmith	undisclosed	WIN
5	Ice Cream	"My Boy" by Billie Eilish	undisclosed	RISK
6	Robot	"Over the Rainbow" by Judy Garland	undisclosed	WIN

=== Episode 8 (29 March) ===
Performances on the eighth episode
#	Stage name	Song	Identity	Result
1	Ice Cream	"Dance Monkey" by Tones & I	Lara Schobert	OUT
2	Crocodile	"Take On Me" by a-ha	undisclosed	WIN
3	Robot	"Mesečina" by Goran Bregović	undisclosed	RISK
4	Dog	"Toxic" by Britney Spears	undisclosed	WIN
5	Bunny	"Swalla" by Jason Derulo feat. Nicki Minaj and Ty Dolla $ign	undisclosed	RISK

=== Episode 9 - Semi-Finals (5 April) ===
Performances on the ninth episode
#	Stage name	Song	Identity	Result
1	Dog	"Everybody (Backstreet's Back)" by Backstreet Boys	Józan László	OUT
2	Crocodile	"A Little Less Conversation" by Elvis Presley	undisclosed	WIN
3	Robot	"Szép város Kolozsvár" from Countess Marica	undisclosed	RISK
4	Bunny	"Addicted to You" by Avicii feat. Audra Mae	undisclosed	WIN

=== Episode 10 - Finale (12 April) ===
Performances on the final episode
#	Stage name	Song	Identity	Result
Round One
1	Robot	"Da Ya Think I'm Sexy?" by Rod Stewart	undisclosed	SAFE
2	Bunny	"California Dreamin'" by Sia	undisclosed	SAFE
3	Crocodile	"7 Years" by Lukas Graham	Attila Árpa	THIRD
Round Two
1	Bunny	"7 Rings" by Ariana Grande	Niki Gallusz	WINNER
2	Robot	"Add már, uram, az esőt!" by Kati Kovács	Ervin Nagy	RUNNER-UP

== Season 2 ==
The 2nd season of the Álarcos énekes started in September 2020.

Results
Stage name	Celebrity	Occupation	Episodes														
Stage name	Celebrity	Occupation	1	2	3	4	5	6	7	8	9	10	11	12	13	14	
Stage name	Celebrity	Occupation	1	2	3	4	5	6	7	8	9	10	11	12	13	A	B
Banán "Banana"	Dávid Miller	Singer/Actor		WIN	WIN			WIN		WIN		WIN	WIN	WIN	WIN	SAFE	WINNER
Zebra	Áron Molnár	Actor/Activist		WIN		WIN	WIN		WIN		WIN		WIN	WIN	WIN	SAFE	RUNNER-UP
Röfi "Piggy"	Péter Puskás	Singer						WIN		WIN	WIN		RISK	RISK	RISK	THIRD	
Röfi "Piggy"	Claudia Liptai	Actress		RISK		WIN	WD										
Baba "Baby"	Manuel	Rapper	WIN		WIN			WIN		RISK		WIN	WIN	RISK	OUT		
Egér "Mouse"	Pál Feke	Actor	WIN			WIN	WIN		RISK			RISK	RISK	OUT			
Elefánt "Elephant"	Szilvia Bach	Comedian		RISK	RISK		WIN		WIN		RISK		OUT				
Kaktusz "Cactus"	Dr. Tamás Tóth	Doctor	RISK			RISK		RISK		RISK		OUT					
Maki "Monkey"	Tibor Pintér	Actor	RISK		RISK		RISK		RISK		OUT						
Béka "Frog"	Mariann Falusi	Singer	WIN		WIN			RISK		OUT							
Bika "Bull"	Kozso	Singer		WIN		RISK	RISK		OUT								
Dinó "Dino"	Mónika Erdélyi	Vlogger	WIN		RISK			OUT									
Kakas "Rooster"	Erika Miklósa	Opera singer		WIN		RISK	OUT										
Méhecske "Bee"	Rella Rubint	Vlogger		RISK		OUT											
Tigris "Tiger"	Enikő Eszenyi	Actress	RISK		OUT												
Cica "Cat"	Alexandra Béres	Fitness trainer		OUT													
Süti "Cookie"	Tomi Fluor	Rapper	OUT														

Note: On Episode 5, Claudia Liptai, had quit the competition due to testing positive for COVID-19. Péter Puskás would then become the replacement for Piggy for the remainder of the competition.

== Episodes ==
=== Episode 1 (6 September) ===
#	Stage Name	Song	Identity	Result
1	Mouse	"Let Me Entertain You" by Robbie Williams	undisclosed	WIN
2	Monkey	"Posztolj" by USNK	undisclosed	RISK
3	Dino	"Physical" by Dua Lipa	undisclosed	WIN
4	Cactus	"Álomhajó" by Carpe Diem	undisclosed	RISK
5	Cookie	"Nessaja"/"Fire"/"The Logical Song" by Scooter	Fluor Tomi	OUT
6	Frog	"Cuz I Love You" by Lizzo	undisclosed	WIN
7	Tiger	"Szerelem" by A. E. Bizottság	undisclosed	RISK
8	Baby	"Kislány a zongoránál" by János Koós	undisclosed	WIN

=== Episode 2 (13 September) ===
#	Stage Name	Song	Identity	Result
1	Bull	"The Fox (What Does the Fox Say?)" by Ylvis	undisclosed	WIN
2	Bee	"I Like It" by Cardi B ft. Bad Bunny and J Balvin	undisclosed	RISK
3	Zebra	"Hello" by Shygys	undisclosed	WIN
4	Piggy	"Állj meg kislány"/"Ding-Dong" by András Csonka	undisclosed	RISK
5	Cat	"I'm Too Sexy" by Right Said Fred	Alexandra Béres	OUT
6	Rooster	"Focus" by Ariana Grande	undisclosed	WIN
7	Elephant	"Mindenki táncol" by Majka	undisclosed	RISK
8	Banana	"Go the Distance" from Hercules	undisclosed	WIN

=== Episode 3 (20 September) ===
#	Stage Name	Song	Identity	Results
1	Banana	"Watermelon Sugar" by Harry Styles	undisclosed	WIN
2	Tiger	"Mambo Italiano" by László Komár	Eszenyi Enikő	OUT
3	Monkey	"Rise Like a Phoenix" by Conchita Wurst	undisclosed	RISK
4	Dino	"Dear Future Husband" by Meghan Trainor	undisclosed	RISK
5	Baby	"Szerelem, miért múlsz?" by Kati Wolf	undisclosed	WIN
6	Frog	"Don't Stop Me Now" by Queen	undisclosed	WIN
7	Elephant	"In Ginocchio Da Te" by Gianni Morandi	undisclosed	RISK

=== Episode 4 (27 September) ===
#	Stage Name	Song name	Identity	Results
1	Bee	"Bababó" by ByeAlex és a Slepp and Lotfi Begi	Rubint Rella	OUT
2	Mouse	"Elég volt" by Tóth Gabi	undisclosed	WIN
3	Bull	"La donna è mobile" by Luciano Pavarotti	undisclosed	RISK
4	Cactus	"Pocsolyába léptem" by Takáts Tamás	undisclosed	RISK
5	Zebra	"Smells Like Teen Spirit" by Nirvana	undisclosed	WIN
6	Rooster	"No Time to Die" by Billie Eilish	undisclosed	RISK
7	Piggy	"Bella ciao" by Goran Bregović	undisclosed	WIN

=== Episode 5 (4 October) ===
#	Stage Name	Song name	Identity	Results
1	Elephant	"Nem Táncolsz Jobban, Mint Én" by Lóci Játszik	undisclosed	WIN
2	Bull	"Jogi" by Panjabi MC	undisclosed	RISK
3	Mouse	"A boldogság és én" by Zsuzsa Cserháti	undisclosed	WIN
4	Rooster	"Shake it Off" by Taylor Swift	Erika Miklósa	OUT
5	Zebra	"Soha se mondd!" by Judit Hernádi	undisclosed	WIN
6	Monkey	"Welcome to the Jungle" by Guns N' Roses	undisclosed	RISK

Note: The first version of Piggy had to quit the running in this episode due to a positive COVID-19 test and was revealed to be Claudia Liptai.

=== Episode 6 (11 October) ===
#	Stage Name	Song name	Identity	Results
1	Dino	"Ringó vállú csengeri violám" by Magyar Rózsa	Mónika Erdélyi	OUT
2	Baby	"Yummy" by Justin Bieber	undisclosed	WIN
3	Frog	"Puszi Nyuszi" by Postássy Juli/"Zsolti A Béka" by Bëlga	undisclosed	RISK
4	Banana	"The Pretender" by Foo Fighters	undisclosed	WIN
5	Cactus	"Ma jól vagyok" by Jazz+Az	undisclosed	RISK
6	Piggy	"Single Ladies (Put a Ring on It)" by Beyoncé	undisclosed	WIN

Note: The second version of Piggy joined the running in this episode, replacing the first version that had to self-eliminate.

=== Episode 7 (18 October) ===
#	Stage Name	Song name	Identity	Results
1	Mouse	"Proud Mary" by Ike & Tina Turner	undisclosed	RISK
2	Elephant	"Szeresd a testem" by Baby Sisters	undisclosed	WIN
3	Monkey	"Habanera" by Georges Bizet	undisclosed	RISK
4	Bull	"I Was Made for Lovin' You" by Kiss	Kozso	OUT
5	Zebra	"Lose Yourself" by Eminem	undisclosed	WIN

=== Episode 8 (25 October) ===
#	Stage Name	Song name	Identity	Results
1	Piggy	"Candyman" by Christina Aguilera	undisclosed	WIN
2	Cactus	"Multimilliomos Jazz-Dobos" by Hungaria	undisclosed	RISK
3	Frog	"Raggamoffin 2" by L.L. Junior	Mariann Falusi	OUT
4	Baby	"Nád A Házam Teteje" by Matyi és a Hegedűs	undisclosed	RISK
5	Banana	"Someone You Loved" by Lewis Capaldi	undisclosed	WIN

=== Episode 9 (1 November) ===
#	Stage Name	Song name	Identity	Results
1	Zebra	"Uptown Funk" by Mark Ronson ft. Bruno Mars	undisclosed	WIN
2	Elephant	"Bubamara" by Goran Bregović	undisclosed	RISK
3	Monkey	"Believer" by Imagine Dragons	Tibor Pintér	OUT
4	Piggy	"Shallow"/"Bad Romance"/"Born This Way" by Lady Gaga	undisclosed	WIN

=== Episode 10 (8 November) ===
#	Stage Name	Song name	Identity	Results
1	Cactus	"Belehalok" by Majka & Attila Széki ft. BLR	Dr. Tóth Tamás	OUT
2	Baby	"Gangsta's Paradise" by Coolio ft. L.V.	undisclosed	WIN
3	Mouse	"Santa Maria" by Neoton Família	undisclosed	RISK
4	Banana	"Can't Hold Us" by Macklemore & Ryan Lewis ft. Ray Dalton	undisclosed	WIN

=== Episode 11 (15 November) ===
#	Stage Name	Song name	Identity	Results
1	Piggy	"Bang Bang" by Jessie J, Ariana Grande, & Nicki Minaj	undisclosed	RISK
2	Banana	"Sosem Vagy Egyedül" by Laci Gáspár	undisclosed	WIN
3	Elephant	"Nehéz vagyok" by ByeAlex & the Slepp	Szilvia Bach	OUT
4	Baby	"I Kissed a Girl" by Katy Perry	undisclosed	WIN
5	Zebra	"You Can Leave Your Hat On" by Joe Cocker	undisclosed	WIN
6	Mouse	"Let It Go" by Idina Menzel	undisclosed	RISK

=== Episode 12 (22 November) ===
#	Stage Name	Song name	Identity	Results
1	Baby	"Men in Black" by Will Smith	undisclosed	RISK
2	Banana	"Million Reasons" by Lady Gaga	undisclosed	WIN
3	Mouse	"Open Arms" by Journey	Pál Feke	OUT
4	Zebra	"Y.M.C.A" by Village People	undisclosed	WIN
5	Piggy	"It's Raining Men" by The Weather Girls	undisclosed	RISK

=== Episode 13 - Semi-Finals (22 November) ===
#	Stage Name	Song name	Identity	Results
1	Zebra	"The House of the Rising Sun" by The Animals	undisclosed	WIN
2	Piggy	"Orinoco Flow" by Enya/"Buli Buli" by Durina	undisclosed	RISK
3	Baby	"Kings & Queens" by Ava Max	Manuel	OUT
4	Banana	"Larger than Life" by Backstreet Boys	undisclosed	WIN

=== Episode 14 - Finale (6 December) ===
#	Stage Name	Song name	Identity	Results
Round One
1	Piggy	"All I Want for Christmas Is You" by Mariah Carey	Péter Puskás	THIRD
2	Zebra	"Love Somebody" by Robbie Williams	undisclosed	SAFE
3	Banana	"Runaway Baby" by Bruno Mars	undisclosed	SAFE
Round Two
1	Zebra	"We Will Rock You" by Queen/"Jump Around" by House of Pain	Áron Molnár	RUNNER-UP
2	Banana	"Sign of the Times" by Harry Styles	Dávid Miller	WINNER

== Season 3 ==
The third season was announced on 12 August 2021 and premiered on 5 September 2021.

Stage Name	Identity	Occupation	Episodes										
Stage Name	Identity	Occupation	1	2	3	4	5	6	7	8	9	10	
Stage Name	Identity	Occupation	1	2	3	4	5	6	7	8	9	A	B
Kaméleon "Chameleon" (WC)	Tamás Vastag	Singer	RISK			RISK		RISK	WIN	WIN	RISK	SAFE	WINNER
Víziló "Hippo" (WC)	Laura Cserpes	Singer				WIN		WIN	RISK	RISK	WIN	SAFE	RUNNER-UP
Cápa "Shark"	Tamás Szabó Kimmel	Actor	WIN		RISK			WIN	WIN	WIN	WIN	THIRD	
Lovag és Csacsi "Knight & Donkey"	Dorka Gryllus	Actress		RISK	WIN		RISK		WIN	RISK	OUT		
Lovag és Csacsi "Knight & Donkey"	Simon Kornél	Actor		RISK	WIN		RISK		WIN	RISK	OUT		
Automata "Automaton" (WC)	Adél Csobot	Singer							RISK	OUT			
Szarvas "Deer"	Krisztián Zámbó	Singer	WIN			RISK	WIN		OUT				
Gorilla	Lotfi Begi	Musician		WIN	WIN		WIN		SC (Note: Zsofi used her Super Card to guess the celebrity behind the mask correctly, causing the latter to be unmasked immediately.)				
Kacsa "Duck"	Tünde Kiszel	Media Personality		WIN	RISK			OUT					
Holdjáró "Rover"	Anikó Nádai	TV Presenter		RISK		WIN	OUT						
Zombi "Zombie"	Andrea Szulák	Singer		WIN		OUT							
Katica "Ladybug"	Mary Nótár	Singer	WIN			SC (Note: Fluor Tomi used his Super Card to guess the celebrity behind the mask correctly, causing the latter to be unmasked immediately.)							
Zsiráf "Giraffe"	Fanni Halastyák	Rapper	RISK		OUT								
Csiga "Snail"	Ágnes Kovács	Swimmer		OUT									
Róka "Fox"	Ágnes Szabados	TV Presenter	OUT										
Eperke "Strawberry"	Pákó Fekete	Singer	SC (Note: Ervin Nagy used his Super Card to guess the celebrity behind the mask correctly, causing the latter to be unmasked immediately.)										

Indicates that the masked singer was eliminated by a super card.

Note: Each panelist was given a Super Card (Szuperkartya), a one-use item that allows for a judge to try and immediately guess the identity of a celebrity behind one of the masks. If they get it right, the masked celebrity must immediately take it off and be eliminated from the competition. If they get it wrong, it will be discarded and the masked celebrity is safe. Ervin Nagy used his Super Card on Strawberry (Eperke) and got his guess right which caused Chameleon (Kaméleon) to join. Fluor Tomi used his Supercard on Ladybug (Katica) and got his guess right which caused Hippo (Víziló) to join. Zsofi used her Supercard on Gorilla and got her guess right which caused Automaton (Automata) to join.

== Episodes ==
=== Episode 1 (5 September) ===
Performances on the first episode
#	Stage name	Song	Identity	Result
1	Shark	"Jóbarát" from Aladdin	undisclosed	WIN
2	Fox	"Crazy in Love" by Beyoncé feat. Jay-Z	Ágnes Szabados	OUT
3	Giraffe	"Végem" by Opitz Barbi	undisclosed	RISK
4	Ladybug	"Üres Szívek" by Nemazalány X Sofi	undisclosed	WIN
5	Strawberry	"Iko Iko" by Justin Wellington feat. Small Jam	Pákó Fekete	SC (Note: Strawberry was forced to immediately unmask after panelist, Ervin Nagy used his Super Card to guess the correct celebrity behind their mask.)
5	Chameleon	"Uprising" by Muse	undisclosed	RISK
6	Deer	"Earth Song" by Michael Jackson	undisclosed	WIN

=== Episode 2 (12 September) ===
Performances on the second episode
#	Stage name	Song	Identity	Result
1	Rover	"Nincs nõ, nincs sírás" by Sub Bass Monster	undisclosed	RISK
2	Zombie	"Time to Say Goodbye" by Andrea Bocelli and Sarah Brightman	undisclosed	WIN
3	Snail	"Nem Csak A Húszéveseké A Világ" by László Aradszky	Ágnes Kovács	OUT
4	Duck	"Csiripelő Madarak" by János Vámosi and Márta Záray	undisclosed	WIN
5	Gorilla	"Megmondtam" by T. Danny	undisclosed	WIN
6	Knight & Donkey	"Backstage Romance" from Moulin Rouge!	undisclosed	RISK
6	Knight & Donkey	"Backstage Romance" from Moulin Rouge!	undisclosed	RISK

=== Episode 3 (19 September) ===
#	Stage Name	Song	Identity	Result
1	Gorilla	"Another One Bites the Dust" by Queen	undisclosed	WIN
2	Duck	"Pancsoló Kislány" by Eszti Kovács	undisclosed	RISK
3	Giraffe	"Mennyország Tourist" by Tankcsapda	Fanni Halastyák	OUT
4	Knight & Donkey	"Ez Annyira Te" by Tibor Kasza feat. Heni Dér	undisclosed	WIN
4	Knight & Donkey	"Ez Annyira Te" by Tibor Kasza feat. Heni Dér	undisclosed	WIN
5	Shark	"Apuveddmeg" by Wellhello	undisclosed	RISK

=== Episode 4 (26 September) ===
#	Stage Name	Song	Identity	Result
1	Deer	"Believe" by Cher	undisclosed	RISK
2	Rover	"Júlia Nem Akar A Földön Járni" by Napoleon Boulevard	undisclosed	WIN
3	Zombie	"Kicsi Lány" by Manuel	Andrea Szulák	OUT
4	Ladybug	"Jég Dupla Whiskyvel" by Charlie	Mary Nótár	SC (Note: Ladybug was forced to immediately unmask after panelist, Fluor Tomi used his Super Card to guess the correct celebrity behind their mask.)
4	Hippo	"Budán vagy Pesten" by Bruno x Spacc	undisclosed	WIN
5	Chameleon	"Pop" by NSYNC	undisclosed	RISK

=== Episode 5 (3 October) ===
#	Stage Name	Song	Identity	Result
1	Deer	"The Greatest Show" from The Greatest Showman	undisclosed	WIN
2	Rover	"Hung Up" by Madonna	Anikó Nádai	OUT
3	Gorilla	"Beggin' by Madcon/Måneskin	undisclosed	WIN
4	Knight & Donkey	"You're the One That I Want" by John Travolta and Olivia Newton-John	undisclosed	RISK
4	Knight & Donkey	"You're the One That I Want" by John Travolta and Olivia Newton-John	undisclosed	RISK

=== Episode 6 (10 October) ===
#	Stage Name	Song	Identity	Result
1	Hippo	"Blinding Lights" by The Weeknd	undisclosed	WIN
2	Duck	"Not Gonna Get Us" by t.A.T.u.	Tünde Kiszel	OUT
3	Chameleon	"When the Rain Begins to Fall" by Pia Zadora and Jermaine Jackson	undisclosed	RISK
4	Shark	"Sehol se talállak" by Quimby	undisclosed	WIN

=== Episode 7 (17 October) ===
Performances on the seventh episode
#	Stage name	Song	Identity	Result
1	Chameleon	"Love Runs Out" by OneRepublic	undisclosed	WIN
2	Gorilla	"Ice Ice Baby" by Vanilla Ice	Lotfi Begi	SC (Note: Gorilla was forced to immediately unmask after panelist, Zsofi used her Super Card to guess the correct celebrity behind their mask.)
2	Automaton	"Blah Blah Blah" by Armin van Buuren	undisclosed	RISK
3	Shark	"Blöff" by AK26	undisclosed	WIN
4	Deer	"Caruso" by Lara Fabian	Krisztián Zámbó	OUT
5	Knight & Donkey	"I'm a Believer" by Smash Mouth	undisclosed	WIN
5	Knight & Donkey	"I'm a Believer" by Smash Mouth	undisclosed	WIN
6	Hippo	"Rock and Roller" by Kati Kovács	undisclosed	RISK

=== Episode 8 (24 October) ===
Performances on the eighth episode
#	Stage name	Song	Identity	Result
1	Hippo	"Emlékszem" by ByeAlex és a Slepp	undisclosed	RISK
2	Shark	"Azt mondtad" by Gergely Dánielfy	undisclosed	WIN
3	Knight & Donkey	"Valami van a levegőben" by Halott Pénz	undisclosed	RISK
3	Knight & Donkey	"Valami van a levegőben" by Halott Pénz	undisclosed	RISK
4	Automaton	"Szerelmes Vagyok" by Bëlga	Adél Csobot	OUT
5	Chameleon	"Shallow" by Bradley Cooper and Lady Gaga	undisclosed	WIN

=== Episode 9 - Semi-Finals (31 October) ===
Performances on the ninth episode
#	Stage name	Song	Identity	Result
1	Knight & Donkey	"Sowieso" by Mark Forster	Dorka Gryllus	OUT
1	Knight & Donkey	"Sowieso" by Mark Forster	Simon Kornél	OUT
2	Shark	"Before You Go" by Lewis Capaldi	undisclosed	WIN
3	Hippo	"STAY" by The Kid Laroi and Justin Bieber	undisclosed	WIN
4	Chameleon	"Zitti e buoni" by Måneskin	undisclosed	RISK

=== Episode 10 - Finale (1 November) ===
Performances on the tenth episode
#	Stage name	Song	Identity	Result
Round One
1	Hippo	"Visz a vérem" by VALMAR feat. Bruno x Spacc vs Manuel	undisclosed	SAFE
2	Chameleon	"Warriors" by Imagine Dragons	undisclosed	SAFE
3	Shark	"Lekapcsolom A Villanyt" by Common Vibe x Várkonyi	Tamás Szabó Kimmel	THIRD
Round Two
1	Chameleon	"The Sound of Silence" by Disturbed	Tamás Vastag	WINNER
2	Hippo	"Always Remember Us This Way" by Lady Gaga	Laura Cserpes	RUNNER-UP

== Season 4 ==
Season 4 aired on 10 November 2024 on RTL.

Results
Stage Name	Identity	Occupation	Episodes								
Stage Name	Identity	Occupation	1	2	3	4	5	6	7	8	
Stage Name	Identity	Occupation	1	2	3	4	5	6	7	A	B
Jegesmedve "Polar Bear"	Bence Brasch	Actor/singer/boxer	RISK		WIN		RISK	RISK	WIN	SAFE	WINNER
Teknős "Turtle"	Milán Valkusz	Singer	WIN			RISK	WIN	WIN	WIN	SAFE	RUNNER-UP
Rozmár "Walrus"	Robert Gergely	Singer		WIN		WIN	WIN	RISK	RISK	THIRD	
Kenguru "Kangaroo" (WC)	Tímea Gelencsér	Actress			WIN		RISK	WIN	OUT		
Fekete Párduc "Black Panther"	Erika Herceg	Singer		WIN	RISK		WIN	OUT			
Ananász "Pineapple"	Tibor Kocsis	Singer		RISK		WIN	OUT				
Mézeskalács "Gingerbread"	Mónika Ullmann	Actress	RISK			OUT					
Viking	Niki Gáspár	Logistics manager		RISK	OUT						
Mókus "Squirrel"	Heni Dér	Singer	WIN		SC (Note: A panelist used a Super Card to guess the celebrity behind the mask correctly, causing the latter to be unmasked immediately.)						
Sushi	Zsolt Nagy	Actor		OUT							
Küklopsz "Cyclops"	Anikó Molnár	Actress	OUT								

== Episodes ==
=== Episode 1 (10 November) ===
Performances on the first episode
#	Stage name	Song	Identity	Result
1	Gingerbread	"Úristen" by VALMAR	undisclosed	RISK
2	Polar Bear	"Barbie Girl" by Aqua	undisclosed	RISK
3	Squirrel	"Give It Away" by Red Hot Chili Peppers	undisclosed	WIN
4	Cyclops	"Mit tehet a sejt?" by Jazz+Az	Anikó Molnár	OUT
5	Turtle	"Könnyű álmot hozzon az éj" by Charlie	undisclosed	WIN

=== Episode 2 (17 November) ===
Performances on the second episode
#	Stage name	Song	Identity	Result
1	Viking	"Cotton Eye Joe" by Rednex	undisclosed	RISK
2	Walrus	"The Ketchup Song" by Las Ketchup	undisclosed	WIN
3	Pineapple	"Rollin' (Air Raid Vehicle)" by Limp Bizkit	undisclosed	RISK
4	Sushi	"A Muki fia" by Parno Graszt	Zsolt Nagy	OUT
5	Black Panther	"Can't Help Falling in Love" by Elvis Presley	undisclosed	WIN

=== Episode 3 (24 November) ===
Performances on the third episode
#	Stage name	Song	Identity	Result
1	Polar Bear	"Szállj fel, szabad madár!" by János Bródy	undisclosed	WIN
2	Viking	"A szeretet él" by Plastikhead	Niki Gáspár	OUT
3	Squirrel	"Jali dali" by Mary Nótár	Heni Dér	SC (Note: A panelist used a Super Card to guess the celebrity behind the mask correctly, causing the latter to be unmasked immediately.)
3	Kangaroo	"Eye of the Tiger" by Survivor	undisclosed	WIN
4	Black Panther	"Sweet Dreams (Are Made of This)" by Marilyn Manson	undisclosed	RISK

=== Episode 4 (1 December) ===
Performances on the fourth episode
#	Stage name	Song	Identity	Result
1	Gingerbread	"Can't Take My Eyes Off You" by Frankie Valli	Mónika Ullmann	OUT
2	Pineapple	"Olaszosan" by Grofo	undisclosed	WIN
3	Turtle	"I Got Life" by Nina Simone	undisclosed	RISK
4	Walrus	"Lambada" by Kaoma	undisclosed	WIN

=== Episode 5 (8 December) ===
Performances on the fifth episode
#	Stage name	Song	Identity	Result
1	Polar Bear	"Blue (Da Ba Dee)" by Eiffel 65	undisclosed	RISK
2	Turtle	"Livin' la Vida Loca" by Ricky Martin	undisclosed	WIN
3	Walrus	"Bőg a tehén" by Hyppolit, a lakáj	undisclosed	WIN
4	Pineapple	"All By Myself" by Eric Carmen	Tibor Kocsis	OUT
5	Kangaroo	"Wannabe" by Spice Girls	undisclosed	RISK
6	Black Panther	"Houdini" by Dua Lipa	undisclosed	WIN

=== Episode 6 (15 December) ===
Performances on the sixth episode
#	Stage name	Song	Identity	Result
1	Kangaroo	"Eins Zwei Polizei" by Mo-Do	undisclosed	WIN
2	Walrus	"Ének az esőben" by Záray Márta	undisclosed	RISK
3	Black Panther	"Titanium" by David Guetta & Sia	Erika Herceg	OUT
4	Turtle	"Are You Gonna Be My Girl" by Jet	undisclosed	WIN
5	Polar Bear	"O Sole Mio" by Luciano Pavarotti	undisclosed	RISK

=== Episode 7 (22 December) ===
Performances on the seventh episode
#	Stage name	Song	Identity	Result
1	Kangaroo	"Lehetsz király" by Rómeó és Júlia	Tímea Gelencsér	OUT
2	Turtle	"Paradise City" by Guns N' Roses	undisclosed	WIN
3	Walrus	"Jöjj velem!" by Peter Šrámek	undisclosed	RISK
4	Polar Bear	"Christmas Is All Around" by Billy Mack	undisclosed	WIN

=== Episode 8 - Finale (29 December) ===
Performances on the eighth episode
#	Stage name	Song	Identity	Result
Round One
1	Turtle	"All I Want For Christmas Is You" by Mariah Carey	undisclosed	SAFE
2	Walrus	"Száz gyertya égjen" by Tesók	Robert Gergely	THIRD
3	Polar Bear	"Volare" by Gipsy Kings	undisclosed	SAFE
Round Two
1	Turtle	"A hűtlen" by Edda Művek	Milán Valkusz	RUNNER-UP
2	Polar Bear	"Ha volna két életem" by Piramis	Bence Brasch	WINNER

== Season 5 ==
Season 5 aired on 11 October 2026 on RTL.

Results
Stage Name	Identity	Occupation	Episodes						
Stage Name	Identity	Occupation	1	2	3	4	5	6	7
Gerle "Dove"	TBA		WIN		WIN		WIN	WIN	WIN
Sárkány'z "Dragon'z"	TBA		RISK		WIN		RISK	RISK	RISK
Szupergomba "Supermushroom"	TBA			RISK	RISK		WIN	RISK	WIN
Jégkirálynő "Ice Queen"	Fruzsina Kovácsovics	Singer		WIN		WIN	WIN	WIN	OUT
Díva Boci "Diva Cow" (WC)	Vivien Sápi	TikTok Star/Influencer				WIN	RISK	OUT	
DJ Odi	Péter Kabát	Footballer	RISK			RISK	OUT		
Szarvasbogár "Stag Beetle"	János Vadon	TV Presenter	WIN			OUT			
Cyber Coca "Cyber Pig"	Márk Ember	Actor		RISK		SC (Note: A panelist used a Super Card to guess the celebrity behind the mask correctly, causing the latter to be unmasked immediately.)			
Vattacukor "Cotton Candy"	André Vásáry	Singer		WIN	OUT				
Pingvin "Penguin"	Kovi	Film Director		OUT					
Időutazó "Time Traveler"	András Sváby	TV Presenter/Journalist	OUT						

== Episodes ==
=== Episode 1 (11 October) ===
Performances on the first episode
#	Stage name	Song	Identity	Result
1	Stag Beetle	"Kukásautó" by DESH	undisclosed	WIN
2	DJ Odi	"How Much Is the Fish?" by Scooter/"Sing Hallelujah!" by Dr. Alban	undisclosed	RISK
3	Time Traveler	"Chandelier" by Sia	András Sváby	OUT
4	Dragon'z	"Ringó vállú csengeri violám" from Marica grófnő	undisclosed	RISK
5	Dove	"Csibész Kutyák" by Weszélyes Elemek	undisclosed	WIN

=== Episode 2 (18 October) ===
Performances on the second episode
#	Stage name	Song	Identity	Result
1	Cotton Candy	"Miu-miújság?" by Harcsa Veronika	undisclosed	WIN
2	Cyber Pig	"Kiszavazó show" by Majka	undisclosed	RISK
3	Penguin	"MIZU" by Fluor	Kovi	OUT
4	Supermushroom	"Sex Bomb" by Tom Jones and Mousse T.	undisclosed	RISK
5	Ice Queen	"Let it Go" from Frozen	undisclosed	WIN

=== Episode 3 (25 October) ===
Performances on the third episode
#	Stage name	Song	Identity	Result
1	Dove	"Nádfedeles kulipintyó" by Margit Bangó	undisclosed	WIN
2	Supermushroom	"Szívemben bomba van" by Bunyós Pityu and Mohácsi Brigi	undisclosed	RISK
3	Dragon'z	"Nekem férfi kell!" by Erika Zoltán & Kiki	undisclosed	WIN
4	Cotton Candy	"Elég Volt!" by Gabi Tóth	André Vásáry	OUT

=== Episode 4 (1 November) ===
Performances on the fourth episode
#	Stage name	Song	Identity	Result
1	Cyber Pig	"Canción del Mariachi (Morena de Mi Corazón)" by Reyes de España	Márk Ember	SC (Note: A panelist used a Super Card to guess the celebrity behind the mask correctly, causing the latter to be unmasked immediately.)
1	Diva Cow	"Nyugi doki" by Szandi	undisclosed	WIN
2	Stag Beetle	"Ciao Marina" by Hungaria	János Vadon	OUT
3	Ice Queen	"Raggamoffin 2" by L.L. Junior	undisclosed	WIN
4	DJ Odi	"Virtual Diva" by Don Omar	undisclosed	RISK

=== Episode 5 (8 November) ===
Performances on the fifth episode
#	Stage name	Song	Identity	Result
1	Diva Cow	"Oops!... I Did It Again" by Britney Spears	undisclosed	RISK
2	Supermushroom	"Riszálom Úgyis, Úgyis" by Füles Mackó	undisclosed	WIN
3	Ice Queen	"Ice Ice Baby" by Vanilla Ice	undisclosed	WIN
4	DJ Odi	"Szomorú szamuráj" by Ámokfutók	Péter Kabát	OUT
5	Dragon'z	"Abracadabra" by Lady Gaga	undisclosed	RISK
6	Dove	"Ha legközelebb látlak" by Kati Kovács	undisclosed	WIN

=== Episode 6 (15 November) ===
Performances on the sixth episode
#	Stage name	Song	Identity	Result
1	Ice Queen	"Proud Mary" by Tina Turner	undisclosed	WIN
2	Dragon'z	"Kerek Egész" by Zoltán Bereczki	undisclosed	RISK
3	Supermushroom	"SZÍNVAK" by VALMAR	undisclosed	RISK
4	Diva Cow	"Törj ki a csendböl!" by Gergő Oláh	Vivien Sápi	OUT
5	Dove	"Bye Bye Bye" by NSYNC	undisclosed	WIN

=== Episode 7 (22 November) ===
Performances on the seventh episode
#	Stage name	Song	Identity	Result
1	Ice Queen	"Meghalok, hogyha rám nézel" by Hungária	Fruzsina Kovácsovics	OUT
2	Dove	"Szeresd a testem" by Baby Sisters	undisclosed	WIN
3	Dragon'z	"Néha légy bolond, egy kicsikét!" from A Mézga Család	undisclosed	RISK
4	Supermushroom	"Amíg a tűz ég" by Péter Puskás	undisclosed	WIN

== Series averages ==
Season	Premiere date	Finale date	Episodes (inc. results shows)	Average Hungary viewers in millions (inc. results shows)
1	9 February 2020	12 April 2020	10	1.22
2	6 September 2020	6 December 2020	14	0.87
3	5 September 2021	1 November 2021	10	0.69
4	10 November 2024	29 December 2024	8	
