= Nicsak, ki vagyok? =

Hungarian television series

- Genre: Reality competition
- Based on: Scena misterelor by Antena 1
- Presented by: Attila Till
- Starring: Majka (1); Judy (1); András Hajós (1); Ganxsta Zolee (1); Anita Ábel (1-2); Csaba Kajdi (1-2); Vivien Mádai (2); Joci Pápai (2); András Csonka (2); Viktor Király (2)
- Country of origin: Hungary
- Original language: Hungarian
- No. of seasons: 2
- No. of episodes: 14

Production
- Executive producer: Ádám Németh
- Production location: Mafilm filmgyár
- Camera setup: Multi-camera
- Running time: 140 mins

Original release
- Network: TV2
- Release: 16 February 2020 – present

Related
- Álarcos énekes

Nicsak, ki vagyok? is a Hungarian reality singing competition television series based on the Mysteries in the spotlight franchise that originated from the Romanian version of the show Scena misterelor. The first season premiered on TV2 on 16 February 2020 and ended on 26 April 2020. The second season premiered on 22 November 2020 and ended on 10 January 2021.

Due to the COVID-19 pandemic, the March 15 broadcast was aired without the public, and the March 22 broadcast was not live and therefore viewers could not vote. The final was held on April 26 with security measures.

== Panelists and host ==
In the first season, there were two teams that competed against each other. The first team consisted of singer Judy, comedian András Hajós, and rapper Majka while the second team was rapper Ganxsta Zolee, actress Anita Ábel, and stylist Csaba Kajdi. Attila Till was the host.

In the second season, the lineup of the two teams were changed entirely while Atilla Till was still kept on as host. The first team consisted of stylist Csaba Kajdi, presenter Vivien Mádai, and singer Joci Pápai while the second team was actress Anita Ábel, footballer András Csonka and singer Viktor Király.

== Season 1 ==
=== Contestants ===
Stage name	Celebrity	Occupation	Episodes						
Stage name	Celebrity	Occupation	1	2	3	4	5	6	7
Angel	Szabina Tápai	Handballer						SAFE	FINALIST
Geisha	Evelin Gáspár	Media Personality & Economist					SAFE		FINALIST
Bull	Gábor Krausz	Chef				SAFE			FINALIST
Flower	Adri Nagy	Actress & Singer			SAFE				FINALIST
Panda	Andrea Malek	Singer		SAFE					FINALIST
Octopus	Regina Dukai	Model	SAFE						FINALIST
Frog	Gabriella Jakupcsek	TV host						OUT	
Wolf with Little Red Riding Hood	Attila Ambrus	Ceramist & Former bank robber						OUT	
Pumpkin head	Viktor Király	Singer						OUT	
Fox	Kristóf Steiner	Actor & TV host					OUT		
Mummy	Feng Ya Ou	Singer					OUT		
Sphinx	Zsóka Fodor	Actress					OUT		
Elephant	Barna Pély	Singer				OUT			
Clown	Zsuzsi Völgyi	Singer				OUT			
Heart Queen	Nóra Ördög	TV host				OUT			
Gladiator	Zoltán Bereczki	Actor & Singer			OUT				
Popcorn	Babett Köllő	Actress			OUT				
Busóman	Szilveszter Csollány	Gymnast			OUT				
Lion	Shane Tusup	Swimming coach		OUT					
Devil	Attila Széki	Rapper		OUT					
Butterfly	Ica Bíró	Model		OUT					
Monster	Tímea Vajna	Model	OUT						
Astronaut	Jolly	Singer	OUT						
Owl	Zoltán Szőke	Actor	OUT						

The masked singer was safe from elimination and remained in the competition
The masked singer was eliminated from the competition and was unmasked upon elimination
The masked singer did not perform

== Episodes ==
=== Episode 1 (16 February) ===
Performances on the first episode
#	Stage name	Song	Identity	Result
Round 1
1	Owl	"Du hast" by Rammstein	Zoltán Szőke	OUT
2	Astronaut	"24K Magic" by Bruno Mars	undisclosed	SAFE
3	Monster	"Baby Shark" - children's song	undisclosed	SAFE
4	Octopus	"Caruso" by Lucio Dalla	undisclosed	SAFE
Round 2
5	Monster	"Born in the U.S.A." by Bruce Springsteen	undisclosed	SAFE
6	Octopus	"Crazy" by Gnarls Barkley	undisclosed	SAFE
7	Astronaut	"Könnyű álmot hozzon az éj" by Charlie	Jolly	OUT
Round 3
8	Monster	"Szeresd a testem" by Baby Sisters	Tímea Vajna	OUT
9	Octopus	"Chandelier" by Sia	undisclosed	SAFE

=== Episode 2 (23 February) ===
Performances on the Second episode
#	Stage name	Song	Identity	Result
Round 1
1	Lion	"Can't Feel My Face" by The Weeknd	undisclosed	SAFE
2	Panda	"Heal the World" by Michael Jackson	undisclosed	SAFE
3	Devil	"Mundian To Bach Ke" by Panjabi MC	undisclosed	SAFE
4	Butterfly	"Zombie" by The Cranberries	Ica Bíró	OUT
Round 2
5	Panda	"Roar" by Katy Perry	undisclosed	SAFE
6	Devil	"Night Fever" by Bee Gees	Attila Széki	OUT
7	Lion	"Can You Feel the Love Tonight" by Elton John	undisclosed	SAFE
Round 3
8	Panda	"Kung Fu Fighting" by Carl Douglas	undisclosed	SAFE
9	Lion	"I Want It That Way" by Backstreet Boys	Shane Tusup	OUT

=== Episode 3 (1 March) ===
Performances on the Third episode
#	Stage name	Song	Identity	Result
Round 1
1	Busóman	"Honky Tonk Woman" by Z’Zi Labor	Szilveszter Csollány	OUT
2	Popcorn	"Sweet Dreams (Are Made of This)" by Eurythmics	undisclosed	SAFE
3	Gladiator	"Dance Monkey" by Tones and I	undisclosed	SAFE
4	Flower	"Dolly Song (Ievan Polkka)" by Holly Dolly	undisclosed	SAFE
Round 2
5	Gladiator	"Bad Guy" by Billie Eilish	undisclosed	SAFE
6	Popcorn	"Starships" by Nicki Minaj	Babett Köllő	OUT
7	Flower	"Casanova" by Erika Zoltán	undisclosed	SAFE
Round 3
8	Flower	"Kiss from a Rose" by Seal	undisclosed	SAFE
9	Gladiator	"The Most Beautiful Girl in the World" by Prince	Zoltán Bereczki	OUT

=== Episode 4 (8 March) ===
Performances on the fourth episode
#	Stage name	Song	Identity	Result
Round 1
1	Elephant	"Freestyler" by Bomfunk MC's	undisclosed	SAFE
2	Heart Queen	"Jackie Chan" by Tiësto & Dzeko ft. Preme & Post Malone	Nóra Ördög	OUT
3	Clown	"Cuban Pete" by Desi Arnaz	undisclosed	SAFE
4	Bull	"Bulibáró" by Pixa feat. Kis Grófo	undisclosed	SAFE
Round 2
5	Clown	"Bang Bang" by Ariana Grande, Nicki Minaj, Jessie J	Zsuzsi Völgyi	OUT
6	Bull	"Szerelmes vagyok" by Bëlga	undisclosed	SAFE
7	Elephant	"Party Rock Anthem" by LMFAO ft. Lauren Bennett, GoonRock	undisclosed	SAFE
Round 3
8	Bull	"Tubthumping" by Chumbawamba	undisclosed	SAFE
9	Elephant	"Whataya Want from Me" by Adam Lambert	Barna Pély	OUT

=== Episode 5 (15 March) ===
Performances on the fifth episode
#	Stage name	Song	Identity	Result
Round 1
1	Fox	"The Fox (What Does the Fox Say?)" by Ylvis	undisclosed	SAFE
2	Sphinx	"Azok a boldog szép napok" by Beatrice	Zsóka Fodor	OUT
3	Mummy	"Smooth Criminal" by Michael Jackson	undisclosed	SAFE
4	Geisha	"Sympathique (Je ne veux pas travailler)" by Pink Martini	undisclosed	SAFE
Round 2
5	Geisha	"Side to Side" by Ariana Grande feat. Nicki Minaj	undisclosed	SAFE
6	Mummy	"Despacito" by Luis Fonsi feat. Daddy Yankee	Feng Ya Ou	OUT
7	Fox	"The Lion Sleeps Tonight" by The Tokens	undisclosed	SAFE
Round 3
8	Fox	"Şımarık" by Tarkan	Kristóf Steiner	OUT
9	Geisha	"Loco Contigo" by DJ Snake, J Balvin, Tyga	undisclosed	SAFE

=== Episode 6 (22 March) ===
Performances on the sixth episode
#	Stage name	Song	Identity	Result
Round 1
1	Angel	"It's Raining Men" by Geri Halliwell	undisclosed	SAFE
2	Frog	"Gangnam Style" by Psy	undisclosed	SAFE
3	Wolf with Little Red Riding Hood	"Cotton Eye Joe" by Rednex	undisclosed	SAFE
4	Pumpkin Head	"Riszálom úgyis, úgyis" ("I Like to Move It") by Reel 2 Real feat. The Mad Stuntman	Viktor Király	OUT
Round 2
5	Frog	"A szex vajon mi?" by Pain	undisclosed	SAFE
6	Wolf with Little Red Riding Hood	"Pocsolyába léptem" by Tamás Takáts	Attila Ambrus	OUT
7	Angel	"Egy új élmény" ("A Whole New World") from Aladdin	undisclosed	SAFE
Round 3
8	Frog	"Mindenki Táncol /90'/" by Majka	Gabriella Jakupcsek	OUT
9	Angel	"Júlia nem akar a földön járni" by Napoleon Boulevard	undisclosed	SAFE

=== Episode 7 - Finale (26 April) ===
- Group number: "Amikor feladnád" by Halott Pénz

Performances on the seventh episode
#	Stage name	Song	Identity
Round 1
1	Panda	"Rock Me Amadeus" by Falco	Andrea Malek
2	Angel	"Sweet Child o' Mine" by Guns N' Roses	Szabina Tápai
3	Geisha	"Happy" by Pharrell Williams	Evelin Gáspár
4	Octopus	"Muro Shávo" by Ternipe	Regina Dukai
5	Flower	"Oops!... I Did It Again" by Britney Spears	Adri Nagy
6	Bull	"Do Wah Diddy Diddy" by Manfred Mann	Gábor Krausz

== Season 2 ==
=== Contestants ===
Stage name	Celebrity	Occupation	Episodes						
Stage name	Celebrity	Occupation	1	2	3	4	5	6	7
Tiger	Viktoria Metzker	DJ	SAFE					SAFE	FINALIST
Doll	Enikő Mihalik	Model					SAFE	SAFE	FINALIST
Crow	Ákos Dobrády	Singer			SAFE			SAFE	FINALIST
Disco Ball	Zozo Kempf	BMX Rider		SAFE				OUT	
Bee	Zita Karsai	Dancer				SAFE		OUT	
Spider	Kriszta Hevesi	Sexologist					OUT		
Storm	Margó Bódi	Singer					OUT		
Moth	Gigi Radics	Singer					OUT		
Bat	Tamás Horváth	Singer				OUT			
King	Pál Győrfi	Paramedic				OUT			
TV	Tamás Zsidró	Stylist				OUT			
Cat	Boglárka Csősz	Actress			OUT				
Seahorse	Fescó Szegedi	Businessman			OUT				
Painting	Marika Oszvald	Actress			OUT				
Mouse	Zsuzsa Demcsák	TV Presenter		OUT					
Pirate	Atilla Pataky	Singer		OUT					
Nun	András Stohl	Actor		OUT					
Horse	László Cseh	Competitive Swimmer	OUT						
Swan	Zséda	Singer	OUT						
Corn	Lacjsi Lagzi	Musician	OUT						

The masked singer was safe from elimination and remained in the competition
The masked singer was eliminated from the competition and was unmasked upon elimination
The masked singer did not perform

== Episodes ==
=== Episode 1 (22 November) ===
Performances on the first episode
#	Stage name	Song	Identity	Result
Round 1
1	Horse	"Enter Sandman" by Metallica	undisclosed	SAFE
2	Corn	"Can't Stop the Feeling! by Justin Timberlake	Lacjsi Lagzi	OUT
3	Swan	"Jump" by Kris Kross	undisclosed	SAFE
4	Tiger	"Hello" by Adele	undisclosed	SAFE
Round 2
5	Horse	"#thatPOWER" by will.i.am feat. Justin Bieber	undisclosed	SAFE
6	Tiger	"Eye of the Tiger" by Survivor	undisclosed	SAFE
7	Swan	"The Diva Dance" by Éric Serra and Inva Mula	Zséda	OUT
Round 3
8	Tiger	"Stupid Love" by Lady Gaga	undisclosed	SAFE
9	Horse	"Yoszefváros" by Animal Cannibals	László Cseh	OUT

=== Episode 2 (29 November) ===
Performances on the second episode
#	Stage name	Song	Identity	Result
Round 1
1	Disco Ball	"Blinding Lights" by The Weeknd	undisclosed	SAFE
2	Mouse	"Volt egy régi december" by Liz Callaway	undisclosed	SAFE
3	Nun	"Joyful, Joyful" by St. Francis Choir feat. Lauryn Hill	András Stohl	OUT
4	Pirate	"I Just Called to Say I Love You" by Stevie Wonder	undisclosed	SAFE
Round 2
5	Mouse	"Bella ciao"	undisclosed	SAFE
6	Disco Ball	"Blöff" by AK26	undisclosed	SAFE
7	Pirate	"'Stu Bbene" by Alessandro Safina	Atilla Pataky	OUT
Round 2
8	Disco Ball	"Fireball" by Pitbull feat. John Ryan	undisclosed	SAFE
9	Mouse	"Gettin' Jiggy wit It" by Will Smith	Zsuzsa Demcsák	OUT

=== Episode 3 (6 December) ===
Performances on the third episode
#	Stage name	Song	Identity	Result
Round 1
1	Crow	"Enigma (Give a Bit of Mmh to Me)" by Amanda Lear	undisclosed	SAFE
2	Cat	"Ritual" by Tiësto, Jonas Blue, and Rita Ora	undisclosed	SAFE
3	Painting	"Ajjajjaj" by Quimby	Marika Oszvald	OUT
4	Seahorse	"PPAP (Pen-Pineapple-Apple-Pen)" by Pikotaro	undisclosed	SAFE
Round 2
5	Crow	"Figaro" by Luciano Pavarotti	undisclosed	SAFE
6	Seahorse	"Lady N" by György Korda	Fescó Szegedi	OUT
7	Cat	"Miú, Mi Újság?" by Júlia Postásy	undisclosed	SAFE
Round 3
8	Crow	"Tündi bündi" by Majka	undisclosed	SAFE
9	Cat	"Ederlezi" by Goran Bregović	Boglárka Csősz	OUT

=== Episode 4 (13 December) ===
Performances on the fourth episode
#	Stage name	Song	Identity	Result
Round 1
1	Bee	"Single Ladies (Put a Ring on It)" by Beyoncé	undisclosed	SAFE
2	TV	"Dschinghis Khan" by Dschinghis Khan	Tamás Zsidró	OUT
3	Bat	"Toxic" by Britney Spears	undisclosed	SAFE
4	King	"Meseautó" by Gusztáv Ilosvay	undisclosed	SAFE
Round 2
5	Bee	"I'm So Excited" by The Pointer Sisters	undisclosed	SAFE
6	King	"U Can't Touch This" by MC Hammer	Pál Győrfi	OUT
7	Bat	"The Sound of Silence" by Disturbed	undisclosed	SAFE
Round 2
8	Bat	"Sucker" by Jonas Brothers	Tamás Horváth	OUT
9	Bee	"Honey, Honey" by ABBA	undisclosed	SAFE

=== Episode 5 (20 December) ===
Performances on the fifth episode
#	Stage name	Song	Identity	Result
Round 1
1	Doll	"Kiss" by Prince	undisclosed	SAFE
2	Spider	"Love You like a Love Song" by Selena Gomez & the Scene	undisclosed	SAFE
3	Storm	"99 Luftballons" by Nena	undisclosed	SAFE
4	Moth	"Bodak Yellow"/"I Like It" by Cardi B	Gigi Radics	OUT
Round 2
5	Spider	"Tépj szét!" by Szonja Oroszlán	undisclosed	SAFE
6	Doll	"Push It" by Salt-N-Pepa	undisclosed	SAFE
7	Storm	"Eső" by Margaret Island	Margó Bódi	OUT
Round 3
8	Spider	"Sofia" by Álvaro Soler	Kriszta Hevesi	OUT
9	Doll	"I'll Be There"/"ABC"/"Blame It on the Boogie" by The Jackson 5	undisclosed	SAFE

=== Episode 6 - Semi-Finals (3 January) ===
- Group Performance: "Don't You Worry Child" by Swedish House Mafia feat. John Martin

Performances on the sixth episode
#	Stage name	Song	Identity	Result
Round 1
1	Disco Ball	"Shut Up and Dance" by Walk the Moon	undisclosed	SAFE
2	Tiger	"Happy" by Pharrell Williams	undisclosed	SAFE
3	Bee	"Wannabe" by Spice Girls	Zita Karsai	OUT
4	Crow	"Mennyország Tourist" by Tankcsapda	undisclosed	SAFE
5	Doll	"Ave Maria" by Beyoncé	undisclosed	SAFE
Round 2
6	Crow	"Shine" by Take That	undisclosed	SAFE
7	Tiger	"Lean On" by Major Lazer and DJ Snake feat. MØ	undisclosed	SAFE
8	Disco Ball	"Nádfedeles Kulipintyó" by Margot Bangó	Zozo Kempf	OUT

=== Episode 7 - Finale (10 January) ===
Performances on the seventh episode
#	Stage name	Song	
Round 1
1	Doll & Zoltán Szőke	"Barbie Girl" by Aqua	
2	Tiger & Andrea Malek	"Rain on Me" by Lady Gaga and Ariana Grande	
3	Crow & Tímea Vajna	"Macarena" by Los del Río	
Round 2
#	Stage name	Song	Identity
4	Tiger	"Higher Love" by Kygo and Whitney Houston	undisclosed
5	Doll	"Jai Ho! (You Are My Destiny)" by A. R. Rahman and The Pussycat Dolls	undisclosed
6	Crow	"Skin" by Rag'n'Bone Man	Ákos Dobrády
Round 3
7	Tiger	"Because the Night" by Cascada	Viktoria Metzker
8	Doll	"Together Again" by Janet Jackson	Enikő Mihalik

== Ratings ==
Episode	Date	Time (CET)	Official rating (millions)	Weekly rank
1	16 February	Sunday 6.45 p.m.	0.83	4
2	23 February	Sunday 6.45 p.m.	0.89	4
3	1 March	Sunday 6.45 p.m.	0.83	6
4	8 March	Sunday 6.45 p.m.	0.76	8
5	15 March	Sunday 6.45 p.m.	0.89	5
6	22 March	Sunday 6.45 p.m.	0,83	9
7	26 April	Sunday 6.45 p.m.	1,01	1
