= Mutasd a hangod! season 2 =

Television game show season

Mutasd a hangod!
- Season 2
- Starring: Bea Hargitai; Szabi Papp; Ferenc Rákóczi
- Hosted by: András Stohl
- Winners: Good singers: 2; Bad singers: 4
- No. of episodes: 6

Release
- Original network: TV2
- Original release: 3 February – 10 March 2024

Season chronology
- ← Previous; Season 1

The second season of the Hungarian television mystery music game show Mutasd a hangod! premiered on TV2 on 3 February 2024.

== Gameplay ==
=== Format ===
According to the original South Korean rules, the guest artist and contestants must attempt to eliminate bad singers during its game phase. At the final performance, the last remaining mystery singer is revealed as either good or bad by means of a duet between them and one of the guest artists.

The contestants must eliminate one mystery singer at the end of each round, receiving 500,000 Ft if they eliminate a bad singer. At the end of a game, if the contestants decide to walk away, they will keep the money had won in previous rounds; if they decide to risk for the last remaining mystery singer, they win 5,000,000 Ft if a singer is good, or lose their all winnings if a singer is bad.

=== Rounds ===
1. Lip sync round
  Six mystery singers are divided into pairs, in which each compete a lip sync battle against each other.
2. Evidence round
  The guest artist and contestants are presented with a video package containing possible clues by one of the mystery singers of their choice.
3. Interrogation round
  The guest artist and contestants may ask questions to the remaining mystery singers. Good singers are required to give truthful responses, while the bad singers must lie.

== Episodes ==
=== Guest artists ===
Legend:
Good singer
Bad singer
— The contestants chose to risk the money.
— The contestants chose to walk away with the money.

Episode		Guest artist (Note: Players' notes: For the returning guest artists (who also include foreigners and former good singers), names are displayed in italics.; For the mixed groups, names who identified as bad singers are displayed in italics.)	Contestants	Mystery singers (In their respective numbers and aliases)					
#	Date	Guest artist	Contestants	Elimination order					Winner
#	Date	Guest artist	Contestants	Lip sync round			Evidence round	Interrogation round	Winner
1	3 February 2024	Péter Marics (Valmar)	Melinda and Zsombor → 500,000 Ft	6. László Zsákovics; (Bus Driver)	5. Róbert Magyar; (Fisherman)	1. Ilka Borbála Fodor; (Secretary)	4. Fanni Badik; (Cheerleader)	2. Márk Rencz; (Hunter)	3. Szilvia Farkas; Cosmetician
2	10 February 2024	Mary Nótár	Fatima and Richárd → 5,000,000 Ft	1. Klaudia Kalmár; (Painter)	3. Benjámin Major; (Postman)	4. Csillag Szábo; (Make-up Artist)	5. Rita Bathó; (Dressmaker)	6. Bence Éva; (Hospital Nurse)	2. Fruzsina Vincze; Kindergarten Teacher
3	18 February 2024	Attila Kökény	Máté and Roland → 1,000,000 Ft	1. Milan Krnčan; (Tractor Driver)	3. Xénia Jecan; (Stewardess)	5. Tibor Kiszely; (Tour Guide)	6. Dalma Szerecz; (Fitness Trainer)	4. Laura Szabó; (Barista)	2. Annamária Kertész; Belly Dancer
4	25 February 2024	Heni Dér (Note: Season highlights: Foreign guest artists: Heni Dér (SRB; ep. 4) and Linda Király (USA; ep. 6))	Anita and Olivér → 1,000,000 Ft	2. Fanni Szabó; (Bartender)	5. Roland Tóth; (Parkourist)	4. Eszter Nagyapáti; (Call Center Agent)	1. Atilla Dencsi; (Banker)	3. Máté Gudics; (Chef)	6. Edina Mólnar; Hairdresser
5	3 March 2024	Csaba Vastag	Kriszta and Csenge → 5,000,000 Ft	4. Mihály Pellei; (Ballroom Dancer)	6. Róbert Szabó; (Auto Mechanic)	5. Dávid Szabó; (Hotel Receptionist)	3. Andrea Tamás; (Motorcycle Rider)	1. Bernadett Puha; (Railwaywoman)	2. Levente Schvéder; Folk Dancer
6	10 March 2024	Linda Király	Adél and Patrícia → 1,500,000 Ft	2. Dávid Barta; (Darts Player)	3. Zsófia Varga; (Yoga Instructor)	5. Melinda Roxána Koszta; (Gymnast)	1. Dávid Pipicz; (Photo Journalist)	4. Noémi Réka Kalatovics; (Flute Teacher)	6. Sára Tóthová; Tattoo Artist

=== Panelists ===
Legend:
Regular panelist
Guest panelist

Apps		Panelists in attendance (Sorted by first appearance, with episode designations)
g#	p#	Panelists in attendance (Sorted by first appearance, with episode designations)
6	3	Bea Hargitai, Szabi Papp, and Ferenc Rákóczi (1–6)
1	6	Babett Köllő (1); Anita Ábel (2); Ramóna Kiss (3); Vajk Szente (4); Fruzsina Kovácsovics (5); Éva Horváth (6)

== Reception ==
Legend:
Highest rated episode
Lowest rated episode

No.	Title	Air date	Timeslot (CET)	Rating			Share			Viewership			Ref(s)
No.	Title	Air date	Timeslot (CET)	Grp. 18–49	Grp. 18–59	Cons.	Grp. 18–49	Grp. 18–59	Cons.	Grp. 18–49	Grp. 18–59	Cons.	Ref(s)
1	"Péter Marics"	3 February 2024	Saturday, 19:45	3%	3.6%	5.8%	7.7%	8.4%	11.6%	107,226	172,729	489,235	
2	"Mary Nótár"	10 February 2024	Saturday, 20:00	2.6%	3%	4.9%	6.8%	7%	10%	94,142	143,448	416,364	
3	"Attila Kökény"	18 February 2024	Sunday, 18:55	2.8%	3.6%	5.6%	6.8%	8%	10.8%	100,870	175,080	475,502	
4	"Heni Dér"	25 February 2024	Sunday, 18:55	2.7%	3.3%	5.6%	6.5%	7.4%	10.8%	96,896	160,186	473,712	
5	"Csaba Vastag"	3 March 2024	Sunday, 18:55	3.6%	4.4%	7.1%	9%	10.1%	13.7%	131,912	213,353	597,105	
6	"Linda Király"	10 March 2024	Sunday, 18:55	4.1%	4.7%	6.8%	10.4%	10.7%	13.2%	149,613	228,368	574,777	

Source: AGB Nielsen Médiakutató
