= Bango =

Bango may refer to:

== Music ==
- Bango (music), a music style popular at the East African Coast that fuses traditional Portuguese, Arabic influenced taarab music and local coastal bantu languages
- Bongo drum, an Afro-Cuban percussion instrument consisting of a pair of small open bottomed drums
- Bango, a musical group best known for their 2006 cover of the song "Tarzan Boy"

== People ==
- Bangó, surname

== Other ==
- Bango (cannabis), a type of marijuana
- Pangu (pronounced "Bango" in Korean), the creator in Chinese myth
- Bango (mascot), the mascot of the National Basketball Association's Milwaukee Bucks
- Bango, New South Wales, a locality near Yass, New South Wales
- Kecap Bango, a brand of sweet soy sauce
- Bango (sea spider), a genus of sea spider in the superfamily Ascorhynchoidea

== See also ==
- Bang O
