= Mutasd a hangod! season 1 =

Television game show season

Mutasd a hangod!
- Season 1
- Starring: Bea Hargitai; Szabi Papp; Ferenc Rákóczi
- Hosted by: András Stohl
- Winner: Good singers: 3: Bad singers: 2
- No. of episodes: 5

Release
- Original network: TV2
- Original release: 10 September – 9 December 2023

Season chronology
- Next → Season 2

The first season of the Hungarian television mystery music game show Mutasd a hangod! premiered on TV2 on 10 September 2023.

As the season finale was originally scheduled for 7 October 2023, it was replaced by a fourth season premiere of Ázsia Expressz in its timeslot instead, and then pushed back later to 9 December 2023.

== Gameplay ==
=== Format ===
According to the original South Korean rules, the guest artist and contestants must attempt to eliminate bad singers during its game phase. At the final performance, the last remaining mystery singer is revealed as either good or bad by means of a duet between them and one of the guest artists.

The contestants must eliminate one mystery singer at the end of each round, receiving 500,000 Ft if they eliminate a bad singer. At the end of a game, if the contestants decide to walk away, they will keep the money had won in previous rounds; if they decide to risk for the last remaining mystery singer, they win 5,000,000 Ft if a singer is good, or lose their all winnings if a singer is bad.

=== Rounds ===
1. Lip sync round
  Six mystery singers are divided into pairs, in which each compete a lip sync battle against each other.
2. Evidence round
  The guest artist and contestants are presented with a video package containing possible clues by one of the mystery singers of their choice.
3. Interrogation round
  The guest artist and contestants may ask questions to the remaining mystery singers. Good singers are required to give truthful responses, while the bad singers must lie.

== Episodes ==
=== Guest artists ===
Legend:
Good singer
Bad singer
— The contestants chose to risk the money.
— The contestants chose to walk away with the money.

Episode		Guest artist (Note: Players' notes: For the returning guest artists (who also include foreigners and former good singers), names are displayed in italics.; For the mixed groups, names who identified as bad singers are displayed in italics.)	Contestants	Mystery singers (In their respective numbers and aliases)					
#	Date	Guest artist	Contestants	Elimination order					Winner
#	Date	Guest artist	Contestants	Lip sync round			Evidence round	Interrogation round	Winner
1	10 September 2023	Caramel	Judit and Dávid → 5,000,000 Ft	5. Vivien Dankó; (Gamer)	6. Sára Kuti; (Wall Climber)	2. Nikolett Varga; (Masseuse)	3. Otto Várallyai; (Wedding Organiser)	4. Gábor Keszthelyi; (Waiter)	1. Kamilla Nguyen; Assistant Director
2	16 September 2023	Andi Tóth	Daniella and Ádám → 5,000,000 Ft	4. Petra Csigó; (Majorette)	5. Bence Poszár; (Host)	6. Anna Cai; (Face Model)	3. Tamás Cselóczki; (Carpenter)	1. Zsolt Baráth; (Paperboy)	2. Anna Borovics; Rower
3	23 September 2023	Gigi Radics	Emese and Nikolett → 0 Ft	5. Anna Gyurics; (Hotdog Stand Vendor)	3. Balázs Kiss; (Chippendale)	4. Lili Hornácsik; (Beach Volleyball Player)	2. Ildikó Gyurász; (Lawyer)	1. Patrik Buzási; (Janitor)	6. Denis Gyetven; Physicist
4	30 September 2023	Barbara Schoblocher	Tünde and Tamás → 5,000,000 Ft	3. János Hájos; (Footballer)	5. Bettina Pénzes; (Beautician)	2. Atilla Weninger; (Auto Dealer)	4. Dávid Aurél Petz; (Hurdle Runner)	1. Nikolett Anna Tabárné Bujdosó; (Jockey)	6. Brigitta Stefán; Manicurist
5	9 December 2023	Viktor Király (Note: Season's highlight: Foreign guest artist: Viktor Király (USA; ep. 5))	Anna and Gábor → 0 Ft	4. Zóltan Tóth Székely; (Masseur)	2. Dóra Haszonics; (Fitness Trainer)	5. Evelin Varga; (English Teacher)	6. Gergely Tóth; (Gardener)	1. Ágnes Ábrahám-Tandari; (Clown)	3. Róbert Varga; Master Butcher

=== Panelists ===
Legend:
Regular panelist
Guest panelist

Apps		Panelists in attendance (Sorted by first appearance, with episode designations)
g#	p#	Panelists in attendance (Sorted by first appearance, with episode designations)
5	3	Bea Hargitai, Szabi Papp, and Ferenc Rákóczi (1–5)
1	5	Claudia Liptai (1); Cooky (2); G.w.M (3); Győző Gáspár (4); Paméla Tóth-Hódi (5)

== Reception ==
Legend:
Highest rated episode
Lowest rated episode

No.	Title	Air date	Timeslot (CET)	Rating			Share			Viewership			Ref(s)
No.	Title	Air date	Timeslot (CET)	Grp. 18–49	Grp. 18–59	Cons.	Grp. 18–49	Grp. 18–59	Cons.	Grp. 18–49	Grp. 18–59	Cons.	Ref(s)
1	"Caramel"	10 September 2023	Sunday, 21:00	5.5%	6.7%	8.5%	15%	16.9%	20.8%	200,468	322,577	720,269	
2	"Andi Tóth"	16 September 2023	Saturday, 18:55	3.4%	3.8%	6.1%	13.6%	13.6%	16.4%	122,530	185,849	515,928	
3	"Gigi Radics"	23 September 2023	Saturday, 18:55	4.8%	5.4%	7.3%	14.4%	14.6%	16.8%	175,757	261,554	621,420	
4	"Barbara Schoblocher"	30 September 2023	Saturday, 18:55	4.5%	4.7%	6.9%	15.1%	13.7%	16.6%	163,668	225,565	582,000	
5	"Viktor Király"	9 December 2023	Saturday, 18:55	3.4%	3.8%	5.5%	9.1%	9.3%	11.4%	124,632	184,102	463,149	

Source: AGB Nielsen Médiakutató
