= Bangó =

Bangó is a Hungarian surname. Notable people with the surname include.

- Margit Bangó (born 1950), Hungarian singer, mother of Marika
- Marika Bangó (born 1966), Hungarian singer, daughter of Margit
