= The Michigan Every Three Weekly =

Satirical newspaper in Ann Arbor, Michigan

- Type: Student newspaper, news satire
- Editor-in-chief: Nolan Sargent, Saloni Singh
- Associate editor: Elizabeth Hammond, Glenn Hedin, Anjan Singer, Aidan Shoresh, Murphy Stitt
- Founded: 1997
- Headquarters: Ann Arbor, Michigan
- Circulation: 8,000
- Website: everythreeweekly.com

The Michigan Every Three Weekly, also known simply as The Every Three Weekly, is a student publication at the University of Michigan modeled after the satirical news publication The Onion. Named as an homage to student newspaper The Michigan Daily, The Every Three Weekly contains fictional news articles that satirize local, national, and international events and public figures. The Every Three Weekly is funded by the University of Michigan's University Activities Center and began regular publication in 1999.

== History ==
The Every Three Weekly was started by a group of engineering students at the University of Michigan. In what they felt was a lack of observational humor concerning the university, they developed the newspaper in hopes that it would find like-minded readers.

In fall 2014, the "Every Three Weekly" launched its first regular spin-off format, "The Click House," which is intended as a parody of websites like BuzzFeed and Upworthy. It is modeled after The Onion's spin-off, ClickHole.

== Regular features ==
Regular features of the publication include but are not limited to:

- National News
- Campus News
- World News
- Campus Voices
- Opinion
- Around the Nation
- The Click House (in the style of The Onion's ClickHole)
- The Infograph
- Backcover Story or Infographic
- News In Photo

== Notoriety ==
The paper is a favorite among students on campus. In 2014 and 2015, "The Every Three Weekly" was named "Best Overall Literary Publication" in the University of Michigan's Arts@Michigan Accolade Awards, and in 2015 also won "Best Publication Design."

== Controversies ==
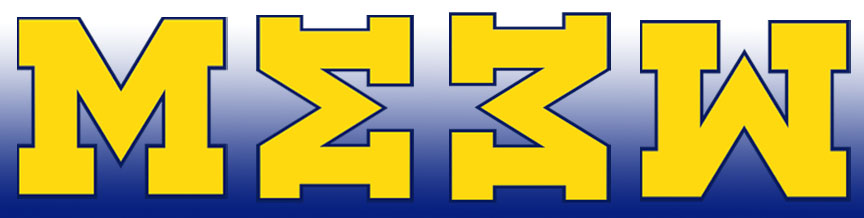
RUSH ME3W: Every Three Weekly official Greek Letters (2009)

The Michigan Every Three Weekly has seen controversy in recent years due to the subjects that it chooses to lampoon. As found by the 1969 U.S. Supreme Court case, "Tinker v. Des Moines Independent Community School District" and the 2001 U.S. Court of Appeals for the Sixth Circuit case "Kincaid v. Gibson", public schools cannot censor a student publication, reduce its funding or discipline its editors for the purpose of controlling content.

In 2005, following the printing of a story about student athletes headlined "Phelps To Major In Pussy", Executive Associate Athletic Director Michael Stevenson said he felt obligated to approach the publication and the UAC executive board, which controls the newspaper's funding. Stevenson was quoted as saying, "I think that that kind of satire is unbecoming to any student at the University," Stevenson said. "It adds nothing to our campus community to have that kind of discussion." UAC President Mark Hindelang, however, had no plans to forcefully censor The Every Three Weekly, citing U.S. Supreme Court precedent.

The publication found controversy in 2007 when the Ross School of Business at the University of Michigan sought to silence the publication's satirical stories about their own students, the back-and-forth emails between University officials leaked to the staff of the paper. Among the emails included one citing several black students who were offended by a fake front-page story on Proposal 2 in the magazine's November issue headlined "White Students with Black-Sounding Names Rejoice at Passage of Proposal 2." The Business School succeeded in removing all publications distributed within their own grounds, but this was halted when it was pointed out that any school paper can be handed out on campus without restriction. In the end, a spokesperson for the paper apologized to the Business School for the situation and no further actions were taken against the paper.

Among others include the recent flare-up involving the local chapter of the Alpha Delta Phi fraternity, located nearby on State Street. After being clearly acknowledged in an article mocking the unhealthy living standards of their house, the fraternity claimed libel against the paper and sought to have the paper apologize for its intention. As a result of this, now all school references must be done with anonymity or must involve school figures that have entered the public domain (e.g. former University President Mark Schlissel).

In the final issue of the Fall 2010 semester, the paper ran a story entitled, "Mall Santa Tells Child Exactly What He Wants For Christmas", a satirical piece highlighting a fictional mall Santa that had pedophiliac tendencies. While no actual expletives or direct references were used, the newspaper was met with resistance, criticism, and claims to copyright/child-rights infringement from the local mall in Ann Arbor: Briarwood Mall. This was because the paper mistakenly included the mall's name in the article, which goes against the paper's policy of not using local businesses in name. A quick Google search with the keywords "briarwood", "mall", and "santa" allowed for the E3W's article to appear as high as the third result (most likely due to the paper's connection with the University of Michigan and its ranking on Google). It is believed by the staff of the paper that this probably confused some local citizens interested in merely looking up the real, non-fictional Santa Claus, but were instead led to an article lampooning Santa. After a few tense exchanges between the paper and the Briarwood Mall, to which University officials had to get involved to defend the paper, it was decided to keep the article online but to merely remove any references to the mall.

== Notable alumni ==
- Megan Ganz, writer for Community and Modern Family
