= Heartbreaking: The Worst Person You Know Just Made a Great Point =

2018 satirical article published by ClickHole

- The stock photo of Josep Maria García as included in the ClickHole article
- Language: English
- Genre: Satire

Publication
- Publisher: ClickHole
- Publication date: February 5, 2018

"Heartbreaking: The Worst Person You Know Just Made a Great Point" is an article by the satirical website ClickHole. It presents a situation in which the reader's hated coworker makes a sound argument during a debate, to the reader's chagrin.

The article's headline and stock photo became an Internet meme used to mock otherwise-disliked figures when they make statements that users agree with. In 2025, ClickHole published a follow-up article titled "This Makes More Sense: The Worst Person You Know Just Made A Terrible Point".

== Image ==
The article is illustrated with a stock photo of Josep Maria García, drummer in the Spain-based band Primogénito López. The picture was taken in 2014 during a work trip to Barcelona, during which García was helping his photographer brother-in-law to set up the lighting for a photoshoot. (The Guardian compared García to András Arató, who also unintentionally became the subject of an Internet meme as Hide the Pain Harold.)

Slate journalist Cameron Wilson tried to find García in 2021 by emailing ClickHole, without getting a response. Twitter user @iamtherog had found that the image was owned by Getty Images, but the image was already removed from their site at that time. An Indian medical website contained the image, still including the Exif data with the GPS coordinates and the name of the photographer.

The image, separate from the article and headline, has been used as a meme with the same meaning.

== Usage and reception ==
The meme is frequently used in reference to high-profile controversial figures, and particularly in the realm of politics.

Mic has called the article "absolutely iconic"; Vulture called it "one of the best articles to ever grace the internet".

== See also ==
- List of Internet phenomena
- "'No Way to Prevent This,' Says Only Nation Where This Regularly Happens" – Series of satirical news articles
