= Hide the Pain Harold =

Hungarian Internet meme personality (born 1945)

András Arató
- The most popular stock image of András Arató
- Born: András István Arató; 11 July 1945 (age 81); Kőszeg, Hungary
- Other name: Hide the Pain Harold
- Education: Budapest University of Technology and Economics
- Known for: Internet meme
- Spouse: Gabriella Andrásné Arató
- Children: 1
- Awards: János Urbanek Prize; Déri Miksa Award
- Military career
- Branch: Hungarian People's Army
- Website: hidethepainharold.com

Hide the Pain Harold is an Internet meme based on a series of stock photos of András István Arató (Hungarian pronunciation: [ˈɒndraːʃ ˈiʃtvaːn ˈɒrɒtoː]; born 11 July 1945), a Hungarian retired electrical engineer and model. In 2011, he became the subject of the meme due to his overall facial expression and seemingly fake smile.

Arató has been in and out of the stock photo and advertisement industry as a model since disclosing his identity. He took up travelling to Turkey and Russia for recreational purposes and kept a blog about his life and travels. The photos associated with such travels are said to be the cause of Arató's fame. While vacationing in Turkey, Arató decided to upload personal vacation photos onto social media site iWiW, which were noticed by a photographer.

== Early life and education ==
Born in 1945, in Kőszeg, András Arató was born and raised in Hungary. He has stated that a major part of his childhood was a gargantuan chestnut tree growing in his hometown.

Not much else is currently known about Arató's teenage and pre-university years. He completed compulsory military service in the Hungarian People's Army and in 1969, Arató graduated from the Budapest University of Technology and Economics under the Faculty of Electrical Engineering.

== Career ==
In 1996, Arató was a contestant in the Hungarian version of Jeopardy! (Mindent vagy semmit!). After retirement, he worked as a DJ for a local radio station for five years.

In 2019, he became the advertising face for Coca-Cola in Hungary.

In 2020, Arató was a contestant in the Hungarian version of Masked Singer (Álarcos énekes), as the character "Szörnyecske" ("Little Monster"), broadcast on the TV station RTL Klub.

In 2025, Arató was a presenter at the Hungarian Sportspeople of the Year gala. He presented the award for "Best Community Sports Event" with canoeist Rita Kőbán.

=== Internet meme ===
External videos
- Waking up as a meme hero — András Arató @ TEDxKyiv

While Arató was on holiday, he was taking photos of his trip, uploading them to social media. Not only his friends saw his photos but also a professional photographer, who contacted him saying that he was seeking a model and offered him an invitation to a shoot. Arató accepted the offer and the photographer took some photos, which both he and Arató liked. He was invited for more shoots and over a hundred stock photos were made. He agreed for the photos to be used for this purpose, with the exception of photos of topics about politics, religion, and sex, as he felt those topics are sensitive to many people.

Arató later looked himself up on Google Images and saw photos of himself as a doctor, coming from a hospital's homepage. A few months after, he looked himself up again and discovered more photos, including one of his face pasted on all four faces of Mount Rushmore. These were the early stages of an Internet meme. The photographer who took the stock photos had asked him to smile, and many internet users perceived his smile as fake, masking sorrow, ultimately giving him the name "Hide the Pain Harold". Arató stated that during the photoshoot he became tired of smiling too much.

At first, Arató was unhappy about people adding funny text to his photos, stating he was not really a "funny guy". Arató realised he did similar things while he was in school, like drawing on pictures in his course books of the Hungarian poet John Arany, making him look like a pirate. He stated that closing down a webpage would not really work, as the meme content could soon respawn, so after six years, he accepted his meme status. He hoped that everyone would forget about using his photos, but that did not happen. First, Internet users from the United States started posting photos of Arató, then the practice spread to Europe, and later on, the rest of the world.

An Internet user, whose identity remains anonymous, found out Arató's true identity and emailed him, stating that there were many users who believed that he was not a real living person. At first, Arató ignored the user's request, but after getting more emails with the same request, he agreed to upload a picture of himself on his Russian fanpage, holding a sign saying "Я ЖИВ" ("YA ZHIV", Russian for "I'M ALIVE"). After a few hours, the photo had been seen by over ten thousand users as well as news media.

Due to the meme's ubiquity and staying-power, he was the most popular candidate for the ceremonial Presidency of Hungary in an anonymous social media poll in late 2026. Ernő Rubik the inventor of the eponymous cube, and Nobel laureate biochemist Katalin Karikó were also popular choices.

== Awards ==
In 2002, Arató won the János Urbanek Prize. The Hungarian Electrotechnical Association (MEE, short for the Hungarian Magyar Elektrotechnikai Egyesület) awards the János Urbanek Prize yearly, which is given to a member who, within the framework of the Association life, has an outstanding theoretical or practical activity in the field of lighting technology. In 2010, he won the Déri Miksa Award from the MEE.

== Personal life ==
Arató lives in Budapest with his wife Gabriella, his son and his cat "Grecko". His son who was born in 1973 works as an architect.

== See also ==
- Heartbreaking: The Worst Person You Know Just Made a Great Point
- List of Internet phenomena
- List of Hungarians
- Pan Am smile
