= Mutasd a hangod! =

Hungarian television game show

- Genre: Game show
- Based on: I Can See Your Voice by CJ ENM
- Directed by: Róbert Vígh
- Presented by: András Stohl
- Starring: Bea Hargitai; Szabi Papp; Ferenc Rákóczi
- Narrated by: Tamás Bognár
- Country of origin: Hungary
- Original language: Hungarian
- No. of seasons: 2
- No. of episodes: 11

Production
- Executive producer: Attila Kirády
- Producers: Ákos Farkas; László Forgó
- Editors: Zoltán Illés; Andor Pécsi
- Camera setup: Multi-camera
- Production company: IKO Műsorgyártó Magyarország Kft.

Original release
- Network: TV2
- Release: 10 September 2023 – 10 March 2024

Related
- I Can See Your Voice franchise

Mutasd a hangod! (lit. 'Show me your voice!') is a Hungarian television mystery music game show based on the South Korean programme I Can See Your Voice, featuring its format where a guest artist and contestants attempt to eliminate bad singers from the group, until the last mystery singer remains for a duet performance. It first aired on TV2 on 10 September 2023.

== Gameplay ==
=== Format ===
Over the course of three rounds, the guest artist and a pair of contestants must attempt to eliminate bad singers from a group of six "mystery singers", identified only by their occupation or alias, without ever hearing them perform live. They are assisted by clues regarding the singers' backgrounds, style of performance, and observations from a celebrity panel. At the end of a game, the last remaining mystery singer is revealed as either good or bad by means of a duet between them and one of the guest artists.

The contestants must eliminate one mystery singer at the end of each round, receiving 500,000 Ft if they eliminate a bad singer. At the end of a game, if the contestants decide to walk away, they will keep the money had won in previous rounds; if they decide to risk for the last remaining mystery singer, they win 5,000,000 Ft if a singer is good, or lose their all winnings if a singer is bad.

=== Rounds ===
==== Lip sync round ====
Each mystery singer performs a lip sync to a song; good singers mime to a recording of their own, while bad singers mime to a backing track by another vocalist.

- s1–2: Six mystery singers are divided into pairs, in which each compete a lip sync battle against each other.

==== Evidence round ====
- s1–2: The guest artist and contestants are presented with a video package containing possible clues by one of the mystery singers of their choice.

==== Interrogation round ====
- s1–2: The guest artist and contestants may ask questions to the remaining mystery singers. Good singers are required to give truthful responses, while the bad singers must lie.

== Production ==
As part of CJ ENM's dealing with Fremantle in November 2020, both RTL Klub and TV2 made interests to produce a Hungarian adaptation of I Can See Your Voice. In March 2021, RTL Magyarország programming director, deputy CEO and CCO Péter Kolosi stated that the success of Álarcos énekes would follow up into localising a South Korean game show as planned. In the end, TV2 Csoport formally acquired the rights in April 2023, with IKO Műsorgyártó Magyarország Kft. assigning on production duties.

== Broadcast history ==
Mutasd a hangod! debuted on 10 September 2023. However, the first season finale originally scheduled for 7 October 2023, was replaced by a fourth season premiere of Ázsia Expressz in its timeslot instead, and then pushed back later to 9 December 2023. Also ahead of its finale during the Big Picture upfronts in October 2023, TV2 renewed the series for a second season, which premiered on 3 February 2024.

In March 2025, TV2 formally announced to discontinue the series after airing two seasons.

== Series overview ==
Series	Episodes	Originally released		Good singers	Bad singers
Series	Episodes	First released	Last released	Good singers	Bad singers
1	5	10 September 2023	9 December 2023	3	2
2	6	3 February 2024	10 March 2024	2	4

== Episodes ==
=== Season 1 (2023) ===
List of season 1 episodes
No. overall	No. in season	Guest artist(s)	Player order (Note: It refers to the guest artist(s) that have played in according to their first game; returning guest artists (which also include foreigners or former good singers, with their names displaying in italics) are not counted.)	Contestants	Original release date	HUN viewers (exact count)	HUN rating/share (national)
1	1	Caramel	1	Judit and Dávid	10 September 2023	720,269	8.5%/20.8%
2	2	Andi Tóth	2	Daniella and Ádám	16 September 2023	515,928	6.1%/16.4%
3	3	Gigi Radics	3	Emese and Nikolett	23 September 2023	621,420	7.3%/16.8%
4	4	Barbara Schoblocher	4	Tünde and Tamás	30 September 2023	582,000	6.9%/16.6%
5	5	Viktor Király (Note: Foreign guest artists: Serbia — Heni Dér; United States — Viktor Király and Linda Király)	5	Anna and Gábor	9 December 2023	463,149	5.5%/11.4%

=== Season 2 (2024) ===
List of season 2 episodes
No. overall	No. in season	Guest artist(s)	Player order	Contestants	Original release date	HUN viewers (exact count)	HUN rating/share (national)
6	1	Péter Marics (Valmar)	6	Melinda and Zsombor	3 February 2024	489,235	5.8%/11.6%
7	2	Mary Nótár	7	Fatima and Richárd	10 February 2024	416,364	4.9%/10%
8	3	Attila Kökény	8	Máté and Roland	18 February 2024	475,502	5.6%/10.8%
9	4	Heni Dér	9	Anita and Olivér	25 February 2024	473,712	5.6%/10.8%
10	5	Csaba Vastag	10	Kriszta and Csenge	3 March 2024	597,105	7.1%/13.7%
11	6	Linda Király	11	Adél and Patrícia	10 March 2024	574,777	6.8%/13.2%
