= ClickHole =

Satirical website

- Founded: June 12, 2014; 12 years ago
- Purpose: To parody content shared on media sites
- Fields: Satire, clickbait, surreal humor
- Official language: English
- Owner: Cards Against Humanity LLC
- Key people: Jewel Galbraith (Editor in chief), Jessye McGarry (Senior writer), Chris Gilman (Senior writer), Jacy Catlin (Senior writer), Stephen LaConte (Producer)
- Staff: 5 members
- Website: clickhole.com

ClickHole is a satirical website that parodies clickbait websites such as BuzzFeed and Upworthy. It was launched on June 12, 2014, by The Onion, in conjunction with that publication's decision to stop its print edition and shift its focus exclusively to the internet. According to ClickHole's senior editor, Jermaine Affonso, the website is "The Onion's response to click-bait content" and serves as "a parody of online media". Critics noted that, on a deeper level, ClickHole illustrates the shallow nature of social media content and media sites' desperation to share such content.

On February 3, 2020, the website was acquired by the team behind Cards Against Humanity. After the purchase, the website's employees became its majority owners, and retain complete creative control.

== Background ==
ClickHole aims to mock content posted on media sites, using satire, and tries to make its content shareable. According to its website, ClickHole wants "to make sure that all of [its] content panders to and misleads [its] readers just enough to make it go viral". In most of its posts, ClickHole tries to convey an underlying message, usually poking fun at social media users or societal behaviors.

The website aims to publish content frequently, setting a target of 7–10 new posts daily.

== Content ==
ClickHole publishes content in the form of articles, videos, quizzes, blogs, slideshows, and features.

Since being founded in June 2014, ClickHole has published parodies of nostalgic content, advice, motivational quotes, sport analysis, life hacks, fashion, and think-pieces (all of which mimic the style and tone of content posted by media sites such as BuzzFeed and Upworthy). Another popular feature is "oral histories" of TV shows, websites, and other usually very recent pop culture phenomena.

The ClickHole team meets frequently to brainstorm about new ideas and topics that can be written about. The team uses social media feeds as inspiration for topics to satirize, based on the clickbait that is shared most often. ClickHole ensures that its employees put detail into how each topic should be addressed from a satirical point of view, so that its ideas are conveyed successfully. It also was revealed that the team is still at a stage where it is experimenting with ideas to see what is best received by its audience.

Content posted on ClickHole also is shared on social media platforms such as Facebook, YouTube, Instagram, Twitter, Tumblr, and Pinterest.

In February 2015, ClickHole began posting interactive fiction adventure games called ClickVentures.

On February 23, 2017, ClickHole temporarily changed its name to Cruft. The change was unexplained, and the name was changed back the following day.

On May 17, 2017, ClickHole was changed to PatriotHole, declaring itself to be "the only viral media site brave enough to SCREAM about REAL Americans" and "the internet's last stand against the tyranny of the Leftist Media." As PatriotHole, the site's journalistic style shifted to resemble fringe right wing news websites such as Breitbart and InfoWars. The site's logo was changed from an orange spiral pattern to a white eagle with orange lines spanning between its wings. Two days later, the site changed back to normal, although PatriotHole was spun off into its own section.

On August 29, 2017, PatriotHole introduced Doug Baxter as the host of its eponymous web video series which premiered on September 6, 2017. The show features Baxter as a parody of conspiracy theorist Alex Jones, parodying Jones's views on subjects like Hillary Clinton, globalists, 9/11 conspiracy theories, and products sold through the InfoWars website.

On May 9, 2018, ClickHole launched a new liberal-themed site called ResistanceHole, which has a similar theme to PatriotHole but targets liberal news media in its satire, and 'attacks' figures like Donald Trump and Mike Pence (as opposed to PatriotHole, which targets ones like Hillary Clinton and Bernie Sanders).

From January 31, 2022, through February 3, 2022, the website rebranded itself as KidHole and removed all of its previous content to replace it with more childish articles.

== Reception ==
Within the first week of release, some readers criticized ClickHole for what they saw as a lack of originality. It was accused of using Upworthy, The Huffington Post and BuzzFeed for inspiration for its headlines, slideshows, and quizzes respectively. One hundred days after its launch, Fast Company praised the site, saying it was "earning praise from just about every corner of the Internet", with 36% web traffic generated via sharing on Facebook. The format established by ClickHole is being emulated by some campus satirical newspapers, such as The Michigan Every Three Weekly and The Georgetown Heckler with their spin-off.

Various writers predicted that the website will be a long-term success because its content has consistently been creative and targets a wide audience. They assumed this to be the case as long as ClickHole's audience understand that the website parodies clickbait, and is not clickbait in itself. Sam Parker of The Guardian said it was unclear whether ClickHole is "a satire of clickbait, or good satire done as clickbait".

Many users of social media have taken ClickHole articles to be literally true (especially those addressing controversial topics), and have expressed their anger and confusion online.

=== Celebrity recognition ===
Actor and director George Takei mentioned the website on his official Facebook account after the ClickHole team published an article dedicated to him ("10 Things We Hope George Takei Likes Enough To Share This List") and repeatedly tried to contact him through social media. In another instance, the Facebook account of Robert Downey Jr. posted a link to the article "What Robert Downey Jr. Would Look Like Today," which had the satirical premise of the actor having died several years ago and stating, "I always try to defy expectations."

After falling for a fake quote attributed to him on ClickHole, Anderson Cooper dedicated the "Ridiculist" segment of the May 20, 2015, episode of Anderson Cooper 360° to the website.

On the July 1, 2025 episode of All In with Chris Hayes, MSNBC's Chris Hayes explained that ClickHole's viral headline turned meme "Heartbreaking: The Worst Person You Know Just Made A Great Point" had recently been "getting a real workout," using it in reference to Rep. Marjorie Taylor Green's condemnation of President Trump's decision to bomb Iran and Elon Musk's criticism of President Trump's Big Beautiful Bill.

== See also ==
- List of satirical magazines
- List of satirical news websites
- List of satirical television news programs
