= 'No Way to Prevent This,' Says Only Nation Where This Regularly Happens =

Series of satirical news articles

Home page of The Onion on May 25, 2022, following the Uvalde school shooting, featuring 21 instances of the article, one for each victim killed in the incident.

In 2019, the U.S. gun homicide rate was 18 times the average rate in other developed countries. Shown: homicide rate graphed versus gun ownership rate.

"'No Way to Prevent This,' Says Only Nation Where This Regularly Happens" is the recurring headline of articles published by the American news satire organization The Onion after mass shootings in the United States. The articles satirize and lament the country's failure, unique among developed countries, to prevent gun violence.

Each article is about 200 words long, detailing the location of the shooting and the number of victims, but otherwise remaining essentially the same.

== Background ==
The article was first published on May 27, 2014, following the Isla Vista killings. Struggling to continually satirize mass shootings, Jason Roeder suggested the republished story to reduce emotional trauma for the writers while increasing their impact. The Onion has since republished the article after dozens of mass shootings, changed only to reflect the specifics of each shooting. In 2017, Marnie Shure, the managing editor for The Onion, said: "By re-running the same commentary, it strengthens the original commentary tenfold each time. ... In the wake of these really terrible things, we have this comment that really holds up."

After The Onion republished the article on February 14, 2018, following the Parkland high school shooting, Roeder wrote that he "had no idea it would be applied to the high school a mile from [his] house". On May 25, 2022, after the Uvalde school shooting, The Onion featured all 21 versions of the article they had written since 2014 on the home page of their website and on their Twitter feed. The homepage feature was repeated after the July 4 Highland Park shooting, when the article count had increased to 25. As of December 2025, it has been published 39 times.

== Reception ==
The New York Times wrote in 2017 that "with each use, [the headline] seemed to turn from cheeky political commentary on gun control into a reverberation of despair". Mashable wrote that "nothing captures that feeling of frustration and powerlessness" following major mass shootings as well as The Onion articles, adding that "there's no shortage of brilliant Onion pieces, but none have resonated—or been as tragically prescient—like the 'No Way' post."

The Washington Post wrote that The Onion "appears to capture the frustration and futility felt by so many people" following mass shootings, noting the increased Internet traffic the articles draw and how popular they are on social media. The Huffington Post said the articles have become "a staple of the social media response to mass shootings", citing how widely shared they are on Facebook and Twitter.

The Daily Beast mentioned the articles in a piece titled "How The Onion Became One of the Strongest Voices for Gun Control". Similarly, Wired mentioned it in an article discussing the power of The Onion's satire in the face of gun violence, titled "Only The Onion Can Save Us Now".

== List ==
As of December 2025, The Onion has published the article 39 times, each in response to a mass shooting in the United States.

Instances of the article being published
| No. | Publication date | Shooting |
|---|---|---|
| 1 | May 27, 2014 | Isla Vista, California |
| 2 | June 17, 2015 | Charleston, South Carolina |
| 3 | October 1, 2015 | Roseburg, Oregon |
| 4 | December 3, 2015 | San Bernardino, California |
| 5 | October 2, 2017 | Las Vegas, Nevada |
| 6 | November 5, 2017 | Sutherland Springs, Texas |
| 7 | February 14, 2018 | Parkland, Florida |
| 8 | May 18, 2018 | Santa Fe, Texas |
| 9 | September 13, 2018 | Bakersfield, California |
| 10 | October 29, 2018 | Pittsburgh, Pennsylvania |
| 11 | November 8, 2018 | Thousand Oaks, California |
| 12 | June 1, 2019 | Virginia Beach, Virginia |
| 13 | August 4, 2019 | El Paso, Texas |
| 14 | August 4, 2019 | Dayton, Ohio |
| 15 | February 26, 2020 | Milwaukee, Wisconsin |
| 16 | March 17, 2021 | Atlanta, Georgia |
| 17 | March 23, 2021 | Boulder, Colorado |
| 18 | April 16, 2021 | Indianapolis, Indiana |
| 19 | May 26, 2021 | San Jose, California |
| 20 | May 16, 2022 | Buffalo, New York |
| 21 | May 25, 2022 (Note: On this date, The Onion's homepage also featured all 20 previously published articles.) | Uvalde, Texas |
| 22 | June 2, 2022 | Tulsa, Oklahoma |
| 23 | June 6, 2022 | Chattanooga, Tennessee |
| 24 | June 6, 2022 | Philadelphia, Pennsylvania |
| 25 | July 4, 2022 (Note: On this date, The Onion's homepage also featured all 24 previously published articles.) | Highland Park, Illinois |
| 26 | October 14, 2022 | Raleigh, North Carolina |
| 27 | November 20, 2022 | Colorado Springs, Colorado |
| 28 | November 23, 2022 | Chesapeake, Virginia |
| 29 | January 23, 2023 | Monterey Park, California |
| 30 | January 24, 2023 | Half Moon Bay, California |
| 31 | February 14, 2023 | East Lansing, Michigan |
| 32 | March 27, 2023 | Nashville, Tennessee |
| 33 | April 10, 2023 | Louisville, Kentucky |
| 34 | May 8, 2023 | Allen, Texas |
| 35 | July 5, 2023 | Philadelphia, Pennsylvania |
| 36 | October 26, 2023 | Lewiston, Maine |
| 37 | September 4, 2024 | Winder, Georgia |
| 38 | December 16, 2024 | Madison, Wisconsin |
| 39 | December 15, 2025 | Providence, Rhode Island |

== See also ==
- "Heartbreaking: The Worst Person You Know Just Made a Great Point" – 2018 satirical article published by ClickHole
- List of mass shootings in the United States
- Thoughts and prayers – English-language phrase used when offering condolences
- List of countries by firearm-related homicide rates
