= László Komár =

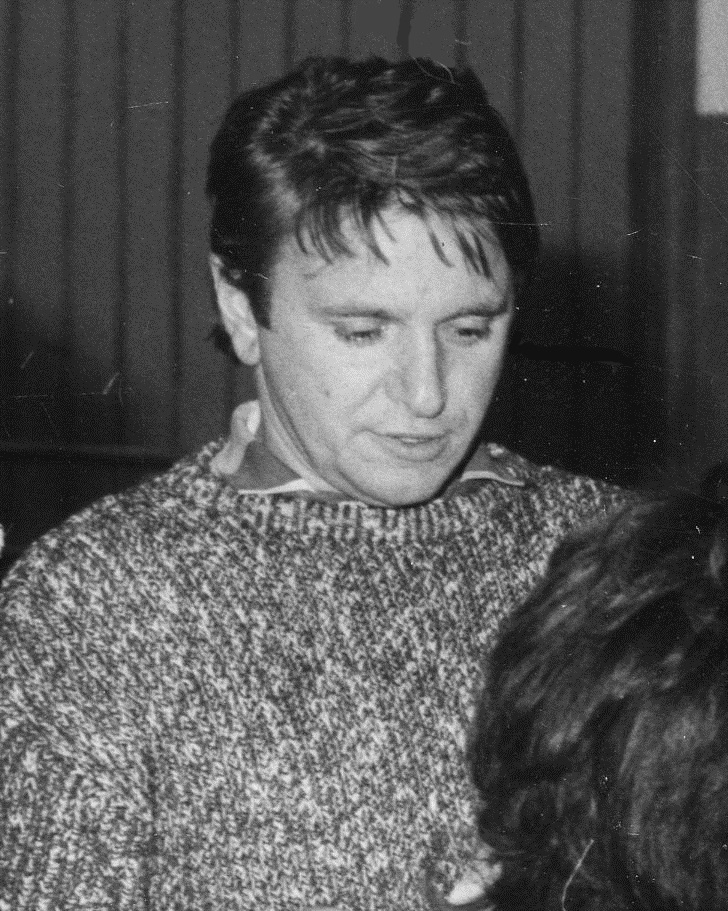
- László Komár in 1986

Background information
- Born: 28 November 1944; Adásztevel, Hungary
- Died: October 17, 2012 (aged 67); Budapest, Hungary
- Genres: Rock and roll
- Occupation: Singer
- Instrument: Vocals
- Years active: 1962–2012

László Komár (28 November 1944 – 17 October 2012) was a Hungarian rock and roll singer. His most popular songs include "No Miss", "Mondd kis kócos", "Táncoló fekete lakkcipők" and "Mambo Italiano". During his career, he released 18 studio albums. He has sold an overall 3 million records.

Born in 1944 in Adásztevel, he was the singer of Scampolo from 1962 to 1965, which is considered to have been the first rock and roll band in Hungary. In 1966, he took part in the first edition of Táncdalfesztivál.

Heavily influenced by Elvis Presley, Komár was widely described as "the Hungarian Elvis". In 2011, he was presented with a lifetime achievement award by Hungaroton. He died on 17 October 2012 at the age of 67.
