= Marika Bangó =

Hungarian singer (born 1966)

- Born: Mária Bangó; 14 December 1966 (age 59); Vásárosnamény, Hungary
- Genres: Romani music
- Occupation: Singer
- Years active: 2010–present

Marika Bangó (born 14 December 1966) is a Hungarian singer, lyricist, composer, performer and the daughter of singer Margit Bangó. She released her first studio album titled "Gömbbe zart világ" in 2016. She is one of the better-known figures of Budapest's nightlife, and has performed successfully in many nightclubs and bars.

== Biography ==
Bangó was born on 14 December 1966 in Vásárosnamény, the daughter of singer Margit Bangó and musician Lajos Bangó. Her interest in music showed early on, but she left her career vision behind due to early childbearing. At the age of 15, she gave birth to her first child, Tina Jellinek, who was later followed by three children. Bangó turned to music in the 2010s, when her children became adults and she herself was able to start an independent career. She signed a contract with Trimedio Music Kft., where her first studio album was released in 2016 with the title "Gömbbe zárt vilák" with fun and gypsy songs. The disc was a success, and both online and physical sales indicated that audiences liked it. Bangó had a wide fan base even before the album was released, as she frequently performed with artists popular in the Budapest nightlife, such as Amanda Elstak or her own mother.

== Personal life ==
Bangó has two sons and two daughters and six grandchildren. Among her children, Tina Jellinek is known to the public for her television appearances. Bangó's husband, Elemér Horváth, is a musician who was once dated her mother Margit Bangó.

== Discography ==
- 2016 – Gömbbe zárt világ
