= János Koós =

Hungarian musical artist (1937–2019)

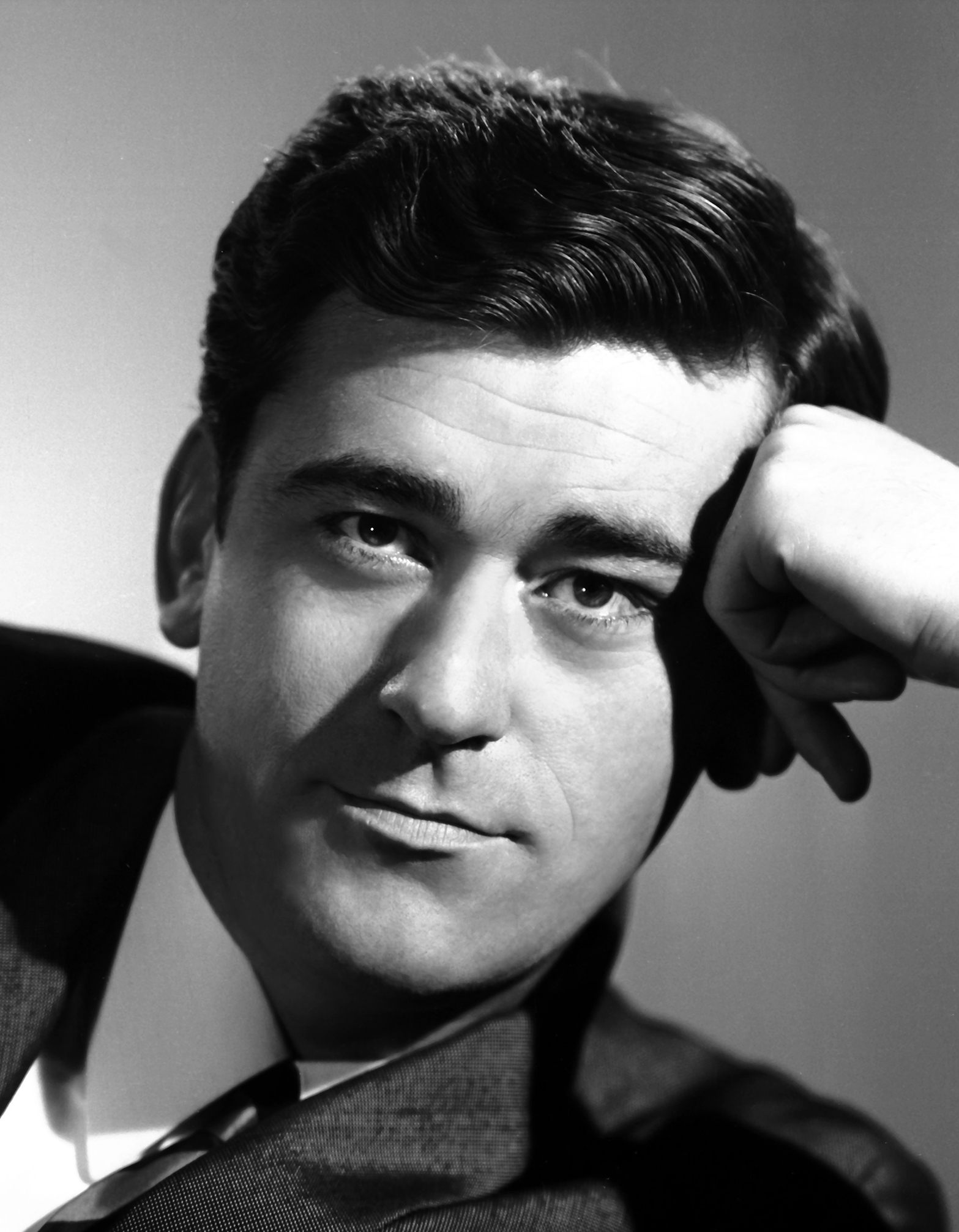

Background information
- Born: János Kupsa; 20 November 1937; Bucharest, Romania
- Died: 2 March 2019 (aged 81) Budapest, Hungary
- Genres: Pop
- Occupation: Singer
- Instrument: Vocals
- Years active: 1957–2019

János Koós (born Kupsa; 20 November 1937 – 2 March 2019) was a Hungarian pop singer, who became successful in the 1960s after participation in the talent show Táncdalfesztivál.

== Early life ==
János Koós (né Kupsa) was born into a Székely (ethnic Hungarian) family, which originated from Lăzarea (Hungarian: Gyergyószárhegy), Romania, as the son of János and Karola (née Bartis) Kupsa. His father was a seasonal worker in the capital Bucharest, when he was born. The family moved from Transylvania to Miskolc, Hungary in 1941.

He studied composing at the Béla Bartók Secondary School of Music in Budapest from 1957 to 1958, then finished the faculty of oboe at the Franz Liszt Academy of Music. He played for the Wind Band of the National Tax and Customs Administration between 1957 and 1960. He started his solo singer career in 1960, performing the schlagers of Vico Torriani. He adopted the Koós stage name by that time. He was a comedian of the theater Kamara Varieté since that year.
