= László Aradszky =

Hungarian pop singer

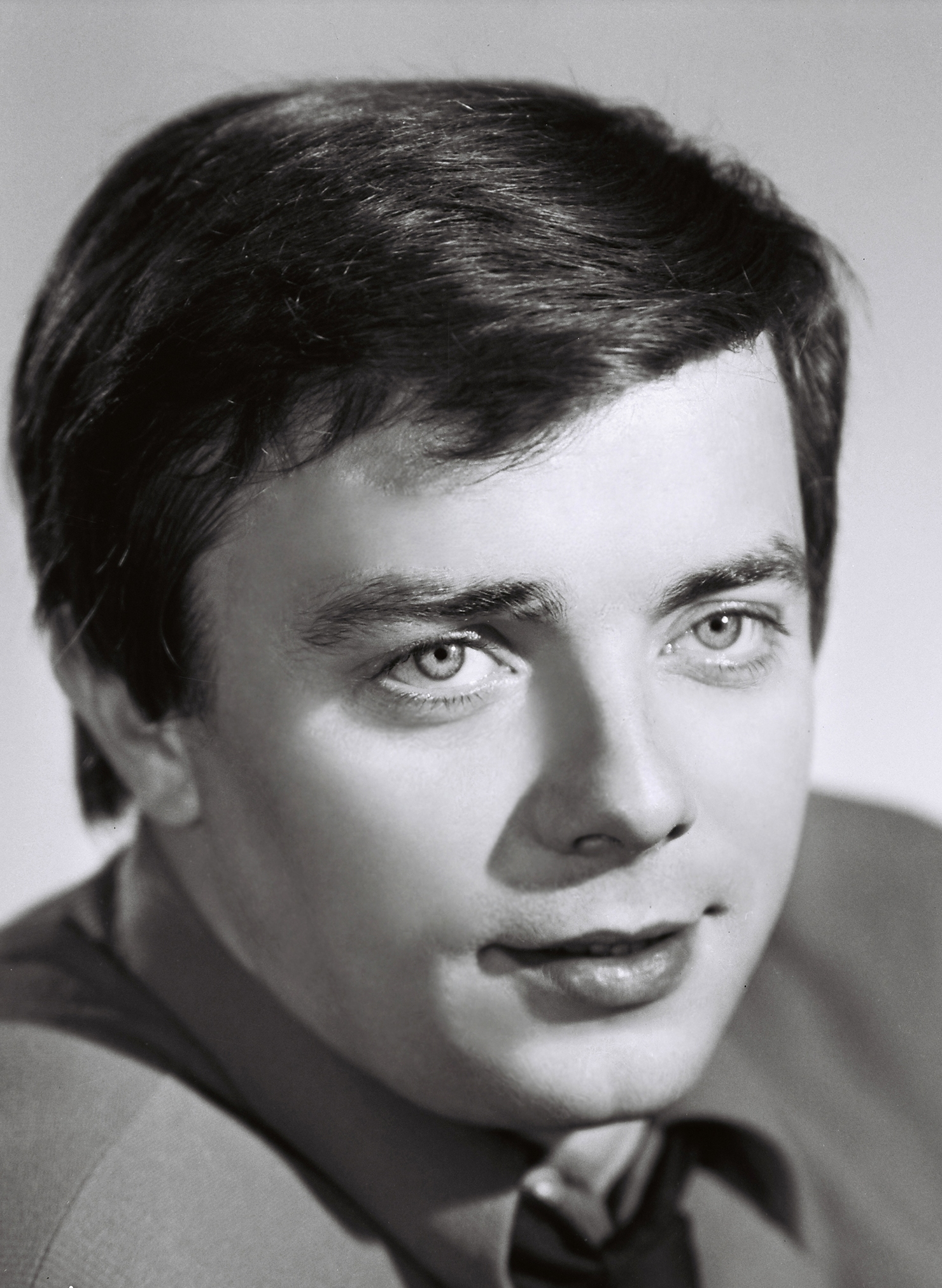

Background information
- Born: 20 September 1935; Budapest, Hungary
- Died: 8 October 2017 (aged 82) Budapest, Hungary
- Genres: Pop music
- Occupation: Singer
- Instrument: Vocals
- Years active: 1960–2017

László Aradszky (20 September 1935 – 8 October 2017) was a Hungarian pop singer, who became successful in the 1960s after participation in the talent show Táncdalfesztivál.
