= Táncdalfesztivál =

- Genre: Singing competition
- Inspired by: Sanremo Music Festival
- Presented by: Various presenters
- Country of origin: Hungary
- Original language: Hungarian
- No. of series: 6 (Classic era); 9 (Post-1972 era)

Original release
- Network: MTV1; TV2 (1986, 1988, 1993)
- Release: 1966 – 1994

Táncdalfesztivál (literally Festival of dance music) was a series of Hungarian pop music competitions and exhibition shows, airing annually on the National Television from 1966 to 1972 and occasionally until 1994.

== Significance ==
In a country with only one television channel, Táncdalfesztivál was the premier chance for young musicians to showcase their skills and become well known in the Hungary of the '60s. It was the starting point in the career of the era's most popular performers, like Kati Kovács, Pál Szécsi, Klári Katona or Zsuzsa Koncz.

As television sets were just becoming widespread, it also meant a good opportunity to musicians already popular from the radio, but never seen performing live. Performers who gained fame through the show include Éva Mikes, Mária Toldy, Katalin Sárosi, János Koós, and László Aradszky. According to János Bródy, the Táncdalfesztivál series played a key role in the renewal of the contemporary Hungarian music scene, which spread beyond national borders.

The TV show had similar, equally successful radio counterparts called Tessék Választani and Made in Hungary.

== Chronology ==
The classical Táncdalfesztivál was held annually between 1966 and 1972, followed by irregularly held competitions with varying names and scopes until 1994.

Year	Title	Format	Date	Venue(s)	No. of songs	No. of songs in the final	Presenter(s)
The "classic" Táncdalfesztivál era (1966–1972)
1966	Táncdalfesztivál ’66	3 semifinals + final	7 July – 20 August 1966	Madách Theatre (semifinals) Erkel Theatre (final)	60	12	Marika Takács, Judit Lénárd, Eszter Tamási, József Varga
1967	Táncdalfesztivál ’67	3 semifinals + final	20 July – 20 August 1967	Madách Theatre (semifinals) Erkel Theatre (final)	60	15	Marika Takács, József Varga
1968	Táncdalfesztivál ’68	3 semifinals + final	20 July – 18 August 1968	Madách Theatre (semifinals) Erkel Theatre (final)	60	18	Klári Poór
1969	Táncdalfesztivál ’69	3 semifinals + final	19 July – 16 August 1969	Erkel Theatre	60	18	Klári Poór
1970	Táncdalfesztivál was not held that year						
1971	Táncdalfesztivál ’71	3 semifinals + final	24 July – 24 August 1971	Madách Theatre (semifinals) Erkel Theatre (final)	46	16	Júlia Kudlik, Ferenc Ősz
1972	Táncdalfesztivál ’72	3 semifinals + final	22 July – 18 August 1972	Attila József Theatre (semifinals) Erkel Theatre (final)	48	12	Júlia Kudlik, Ferenc Ősz
Revived songfestivals (1977; 1981)
1977	Metronóm ’77	3 semifinals + final	9 – 30 July 1977	Magyar Theatre	42	15	Imre Antal
1981	Tánc- és popdalfesztivál	3 semifinals + final	1 – 21 August 1981	Magyar Theatre	36	15	Júlia Kudlik
Interpop Festivals (1986; 1988)
1986	Interpop Fesztivál ’86	2 semifinals + final	15 – 19 July 1986	Siófok Open Air Stage			Katalin Bogyay
1988	Interpop Fesztivál ’88	2 semifinals + final	19 – 23 July 1988	Siófok Open Air Stage			Brigitta Palcsó, Péter Geszti
The songfestivals of the ’90s (1991–1994)
1991	Popfesztivál ’91	2 semifinals + final	9 – 23 February 1991	Fővárosi Művelődési Ház (semifinals) Honvéd Cultural Center (final)			István Vágó
1992	Egri Táncdalfesztivál	3 semifinals + final	14 August – 5 September 1992	Géza Gárdonyi Theatre (Eger)	45	16	Gábor Mohai, Brigitta Palcsó
1993	Pop-Rock Fesztivál ’93	3 semifinals + final	6 February – 6 March 1993	Stage 4 of Magyar Televízió (semifinals) Budapest Congress Center (final)			András Bárdos, Kinga Czuczor
1993	II. Egri Táncdalfesztivál	3 semifinals + final	7 – 28 August 1993	The courtyard of Eszterházy Károly Catholic University (Eger)	42	15	Gábor Mohai, Marcellina, Kata Csongrádi
1994	Fesztivál ’94	3 semifinals + final	15 January – 5 February 1994	Stage 4 of Magyar Televízió	45	15	Dorottya Geszler

== Sources ==
- István Zoltán Kiss. Magyar könnyűzenei lexikon 1962-től. Budapest: ZAJ-ZONe, 1998. ISBN 9789630360562
- Dénes Gáncs, János Zoltán. A dallam diadala – A táncdalfesztiválok története. Budapest: La Ventana, 2004. ISBN 9789638646552
