= Attila Széki =

Hungarian footballer, singer, and rapper

Curtis
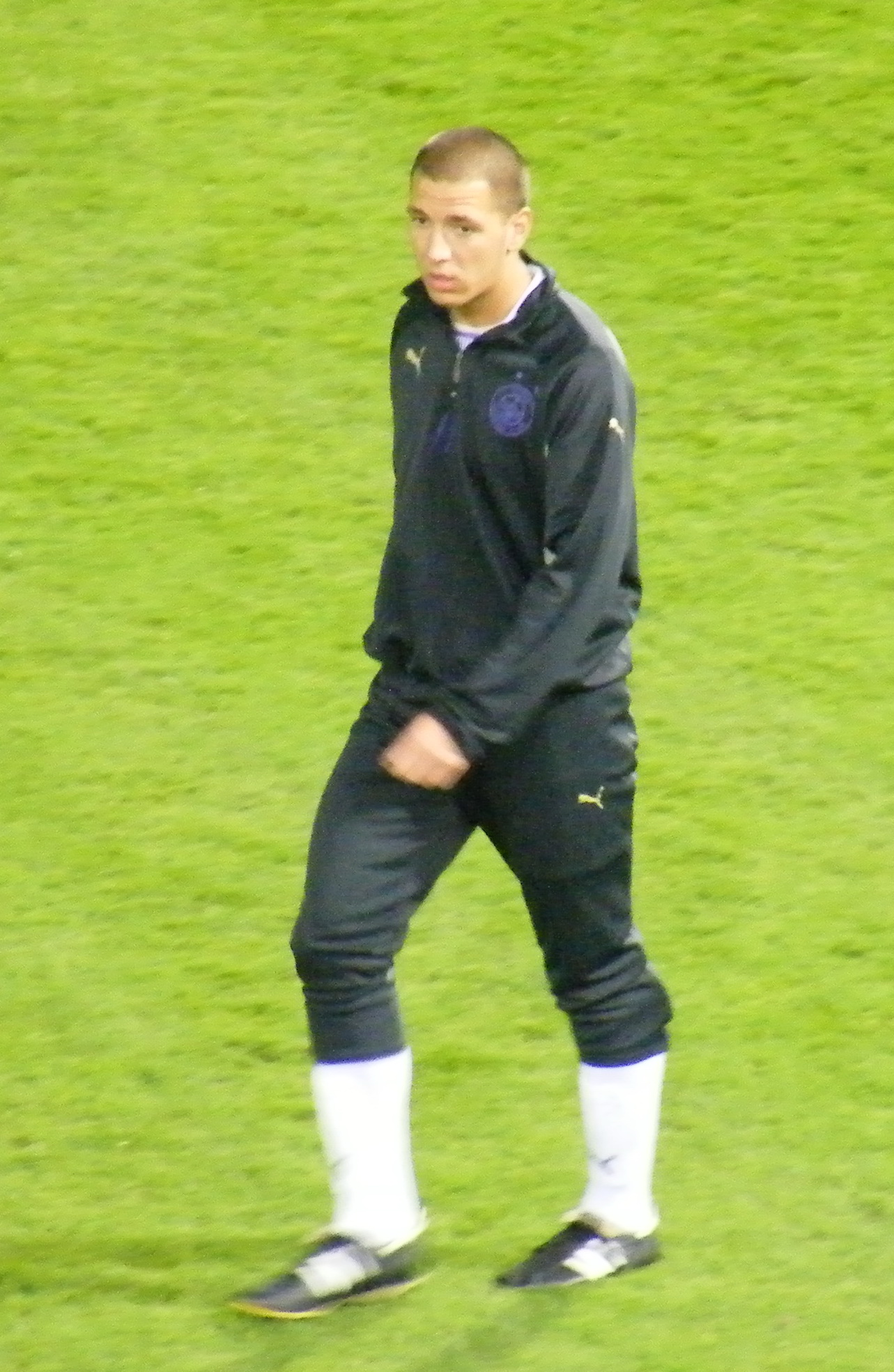

Background information
- Born: Attila Széki; 31 August 1989 (age 37)
- Origin: Budapest, Hungary
- Genres: Rap, hip hop
- Occupations: Rapper; Footballer (retired)
- Instrument: Vocals
- Years active: 2009–present
- Label: Magneoton
Association football career
- Position: Striker
Youth career
- –2007: Újpest FC
Senior career*
Years	Team	Apps	(Gls)
2007–2012	Újpest FC	5	(0)
2008	→ Kecskeméti TE (loan)	9	(1)
2009	→ Szolnok (loan)	6	(3)
2010–2011	→ Újpest FC II (loan)	13	(0)
- * Club domestic league appearances and goals as of 25 February 2012

Attila Széki (born 31 August 1989 in Budapest), also known by his stage name Curtis, is a Hungarian singer, rapper, and retired footballer who played as a striker.

Széki comes from Újpest FC's youth team. He was on loan at NB II winning Kecskeméti TE in 2008. He retired in 2012 to focus on his musical career.

== Music ==
He also has a music career under the stage name Curtis. He commonly worked with Majka.
