= Majka (rapper) =

Hungarian rapper and songwriter

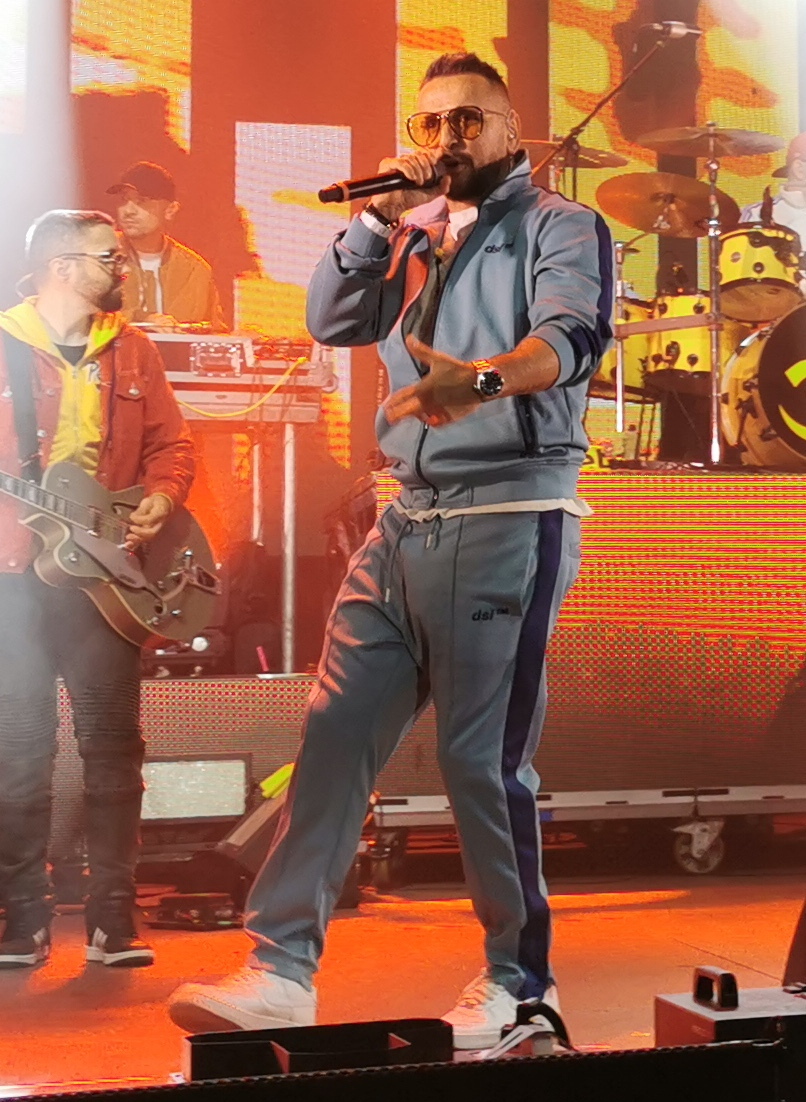
- Majka performing in Budapest in 2022
- Born: Péter Majoros; 5 August 1979 (age 46); Ózd, Hungary
- Other name: Majka papa
- Citizenship: Hungarian
- Occupations: Rapper; songwriter; TV show host
- Years active: 2002–present
- Spouse: Hajnalka Hornyák
- Musical career
- Genres: Hip hop

Péter Majoros (born 5 August 1979), known professionally as Majka, is a Hungarian rapper, singer, songwriter and television personality. He first became known in 2002 as a contestant of the reality show Való Világ, later he started to host on Hungarian TV channel RTL Klub. He continued his career as television show host and produced his first rap album together with the established Hungarian rapper Dopeman. He has since produced several more albums and mixtapes.

== Early life ==
He was born on 5 August 1979 in Ózd. He was six years old when his parents divorced; he stayed with his mother, and they moved to Miskolc. He moved back to Ózd, where he studied to become an electrician.

He was a professional poker player. He has won multiple national competitions. He used to play soccer at the county level.

== Career ==
In 2002, he finished second place in the first season of RTL's reality show Való Világ. After that, he become a host for RTL, Danubius Rádió, Cool TV, then Viasat 3.

In 2003, he released his first solo album, Az ózdi hős. He released his album Történt, ami történt in 2004. His album Húz a szívem haza was released in 2007. His breakthrough came in 2012, when he released his album Belehalok with Curtis and BLR. The Majka–Curtis duo had 270 performances in 2012. He helped artists such as Curtis, Joci Pápai, and Zsuzsi Kollányi gain recognition, and collaborated with Viktor Király, ByeAlex, and Tamás Horváth. He has released multiple singles since then.

=== Csurran, cseppen ===
On 17 January 2025, Majka released his song "Csurran, cseppen". In the music video, he plays Pjetrő Pandur, the corrupt prime minister of the fictitious country Bindzsisztán (called Kleptistan in English), who gave an interview on live TV responding to allegations of corruption, but someone poured a truth serum into his water, making him tell the truth. The music video reached 5 million views within four days, and the song was momentarily the most searched on the lyrics database website Genius. It was one of the top 17 most popular songs on YouTube in Germany, the UK, Austria, and the Netherlands. The lyrics are about Hungary under the rule of Fidesz, although Majka has stated that he does not wish to join a political side.

On 19 July 2025, Majka performed at the Campus Fesztivál in Debrecen, where during "Csurran, cseppen", a microphone was used to portray him being shot. Hír TV reported this as "Majka incited the prime minister's execution."

== Personal life ==
He married Hajnalka Hornyák (also known as Dundika) in August 2021.

== Discography ==
=== Studio albums ===
- Az ózdi hős (2003)
- Történt, ami történt (2004)
- Húz a szívem haza (2007)
- Belehalok (2012)
- Swing (2014)

== Awards ==
- Hungarian Music Awards for rap or hip hop album of the year for Történt, ami történt (2005)
- Hungarian Music Awards for song of the year for "Belehalok" (2013)
- Story Ötcsillag-díj for musical production of the year for "Belehalok" (2013)
- Bravo Otto Award for ensemble of the year with Curtis
- VIVA Comet Superfan Award with Curtis and BLR (2013)
- Story Ötcsillag-díj for male television personality of the year (2015)
- Story Ötcsillag-díj Audience Award for the most popular presenter of the year (2017)
- Hungarian Music Awards for rap or hip-hop album or recording of the year for "Azt beszélik a városban" (2023)
