= Margit Bangó =

Hungarian singer (born 1950)

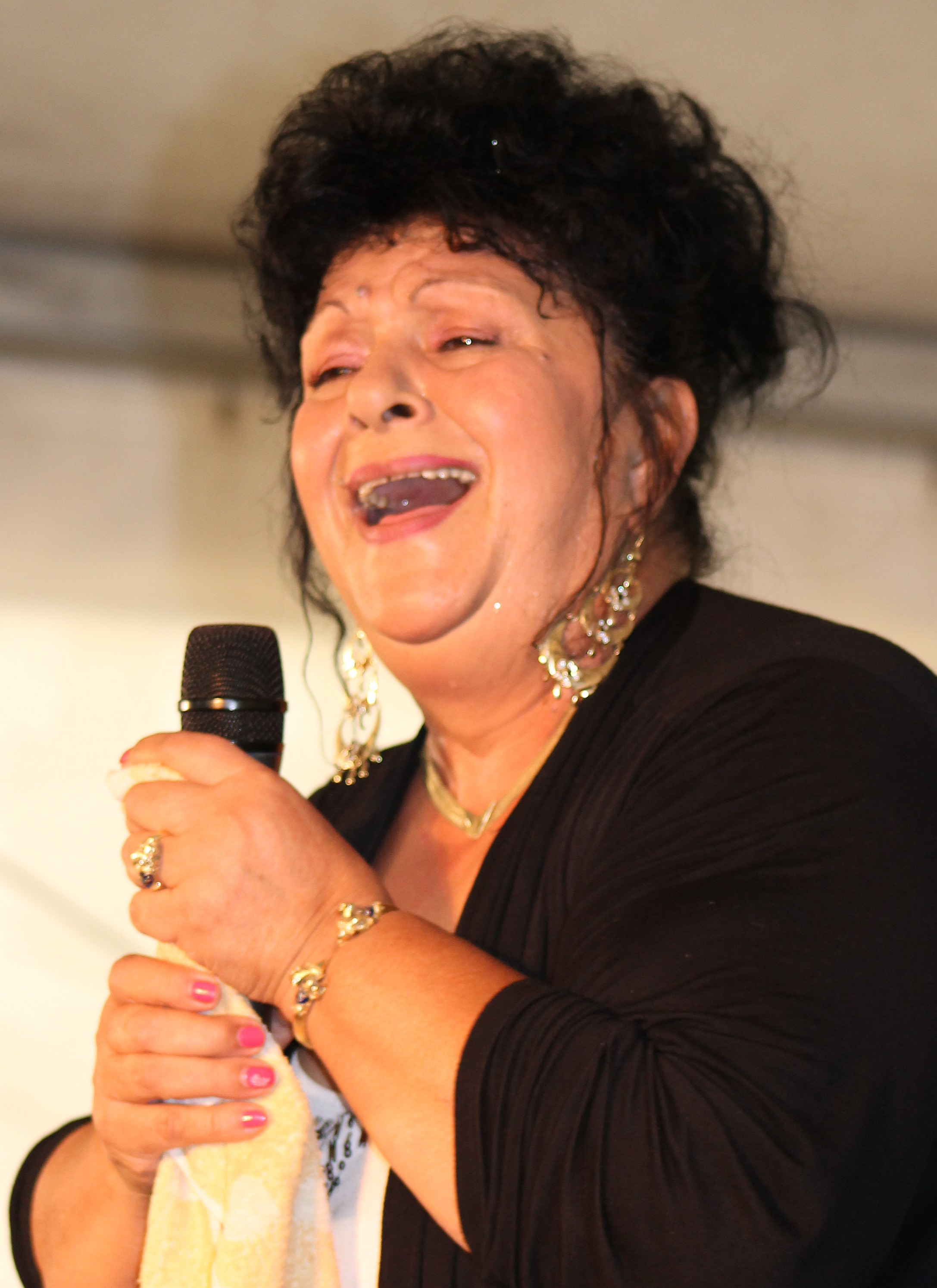
- Bangó in 2013

Background information
- Born: Margit Szabó; 5 April 1950 (age 76); Vásárosnamény, Hungarian People's Republic
- Genres: Romani music
- Occupation: Singer
- Years active: 1967–present

Margit Bangó (born 4 April 1950) is a Hungarian singer and entertainer.

== Biography ==
Bangó was born into a Romani musical family under the name Margit Szabó, her father played the dulcimer and her mother sang. In 1967, at the age of 17, with the encouragement of her mother, she applied to Magyar Rádió's talent search competition, after which the station recorded her. In the 1980s, Horváth had a joint program with Pista on state television. In 1985, Bangó appeared in the film Átok és szerelem, in which she played the role of Punka. At the beginning of the 1990s, she started performing with the Budapest Gypsy Symphony Orchestra.

== Personal life ==
Bangó married young; her first husband was Lajos Bangó, but their marriage only lasted a year and a half. Their daughter, Marika, was born from this relationship. After her divorce with her first husband, she could no longer leave the name Bangó, with this name, along with Lajos Bangó, she entered the musical public consciousness as Margit Bangó, and has been using it as her stage name ever since. Bangó later remarried, and for ten years he was with Sándor Járóka. She was once the youngest grandmother in the country.

== Discography ==
=== CD ===
- Voor Jan Cremer (1990)
- Kék nefelejcs, el ne felejts – Evergreens
- Legkedvesebb cigánydalaim
- Benned láttam életemnek minden boldogságát
- Kik is a cigányok
- Mulassatok cigányok
- Reggelig csak mulatunk...
- Halk zenével gyógyítom a lelkem
- Benned láttam életemnek minden boldogságát (2000)
- Halk zene szól az éjszakában (2001)
- A szeretet dalai (2002)
- Felnézek a nagy égre (2004)
- Két gitár (2007)
- Mulatok, mert jól érzem magam (2008)
- 40 év – jubileumi koncert (2009)
- Minden nap, minden éjszakán (2010)
- Gipsy Mediterrán (2016)

=== DVD ===
- Sej, haj cigányélet
- 40 év – jubileumi koncert (2009)

== Awards ==
In 2006, Bangó was honored with the Kossuth Prize, Hungary's most prestigious arts award.
