= Mary Nótár =

Hungarian singer (born 1985)

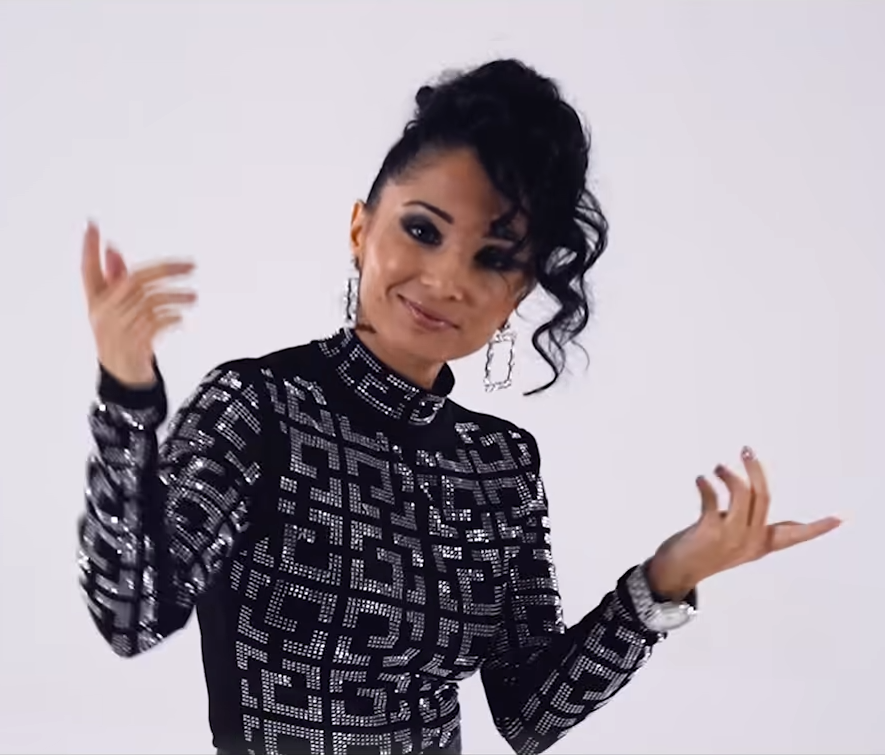
- Nótár in 2020

Background information
- Born: Nótár Mária; July 2, 1985 (age 41); Taktaharkány, Hungary
- Genres: Pop; slager; country; Romani
- Occupation: Singer
- Instrument: Vocals
- Years active: 2001-present
- Labels: Bodi Guszti Producer; Magic World Media
- Website: www.notarmary.hu

Mary Nótár (born July 2, 1985) is a Hungarian singer of Romani descent. She featured in a travelling music festival called Roma Sztárparádé. She hails from the Hungarian village of Taktaharkány. Her stepfather is known to be Ferenc Nótár. Notar started her career at the age of 12, before moving to Budapest.

Mary was discovered in a talent show by Bódi Guszti in 2001, after which she was offered a record deal releasing her first album "Egyszer egy éjszaka" at age 16, and soon after, her second titled "Hajnalcsillag".

In 2004, her third album "Jeges szív" reached "gold status". Her next album was "Roma Sztárparádé 2". After that, she produced two more duet albums with Bódi Csaby.

Nótár made a solo album in 2007 "Cigánylány" which featured among the ten most popular albums in Hungary.

In 2008, she left the label she was with before; her father released her own record label "MagicWorldMedia". To celebrate she released her newly improved album "Hodito Varasz".

2010 was when Mary and her father renamed her record label to "Skyforce Media". Until 2016, she continued to release more albums. Her last album of Skyforce "Zenebomba" was by far the most eccentric out of all of her albums. She was going through a divorce and her father Ferenc Nótár died at the age of 57 due to lung cancer. Because of her late father leading her record label, another leader was placed as a replacement. Mary approved of him at first but she would live to regret it. In early 2016, Mary's check with her savings on it was taken from her and spent on other singers. Because of this, she left the label. It wasn't until July 2016, when she decided to re-release her songs onto her own account.

She blew up. She gained her popularity back and because of that, she started to release her own produced songs and went back on tour.

By 2020, she had self-produced over 5 songs (all of them reaching at least 1M views) but the most popular out of all her 2020 singles was "Tequila with Kis Grofo.
