= János Volner =

Hungarian politician (born 1969)

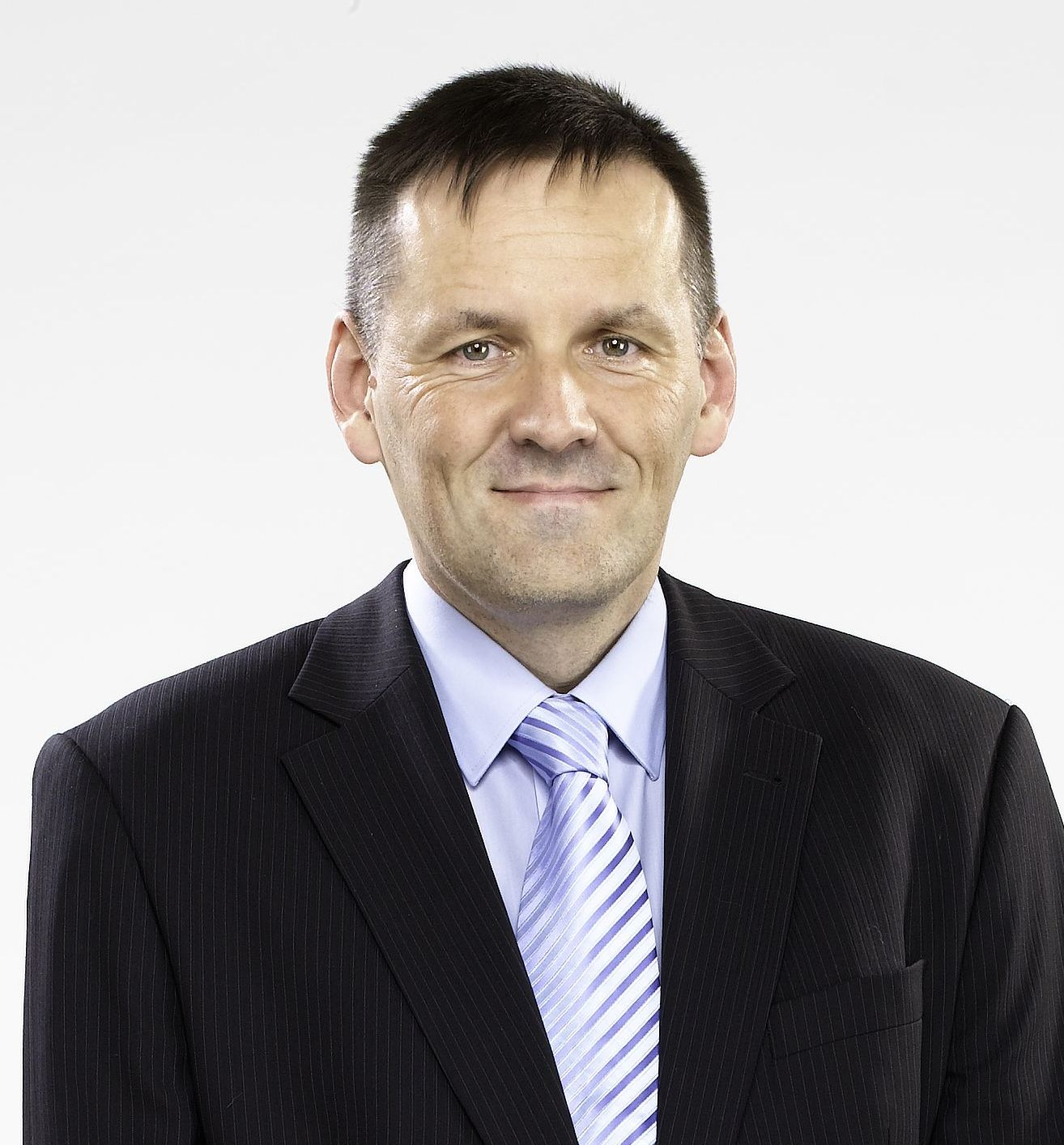
- János Volner in 2014

Member of the National Assembly
- In office 14 May 2010 – 1 May 2022

Personal details
- Born: 28 September 1969 (age 56) Budapest, Hungary
- Party: Jobbik (2009–18); Our Homeland (2018–19); Volner Party (2020–present)
- Children: 3

János Volner (born 28 September 1969) is a Hungarian far-right politician. He was a member of the National Assembly from 2010 to 2022, as a politician of the Jobbik until 2018, then as non-partisan lawmaker. Between 2016 and 2018 he was the parliamentary leader of Jobbik in the National Assembly. On 7 November 2018, he joined the Our Homeland Movement political party. On 19 September 2020 János Volner announced that he had created his own political party, the Volner Party, later known as the Huxit Party.

== Early life ==
Volner Party logo

János Volner was born on 28 September 1969, in Budapest, Hungary. After completing graduation in 1988, he had worked in the Police department and also as a district attorney. He was involved in the field of economics for around 17 years.

== Political career ==
In 2007, he was present in the newly formed Hungarian Guard Movement, and later worked as its national spokesperson. Since 2009, Volner had been a member of the Jobbik Economic Cabinet. He was elected one of the vice-presidents of the party in 2012, serving in this capacity until 2018.

He won a seat in the Parliament during the 2010 election and again in 2014 and 2018. In the parliament, he was president of the Enterprise Development Committee from 2014 to 2016, a member of the Economic Committee from 2010 to 2018 and a member of the Committee of Welfare from 2018 to 2022. Succeeding party president Gábor Vona, he served as leader of the Jobbik parliamentary group between 2016 and 2018. After the 2018 election, Volner opposed the party's moderate change of direction represented by Tamás Sneider and Márton Gyöngyösi. He quit Jobbik and left its parliamentary group on 5 October 2018. Soon, he joined far-right Our Homeland. Together with fellow ex-Jobbik MPs, Dóra Dúró, István Apáti and Erik Fülöp, he formed a representative group of Our Homeland on 10 November 2018, which did not get official recognition as caucus in the parliament due to insufficient membership count.

On 19 September 2019 he pronounced that he is leaving Our Homeland. A year later, in September 2020, he formed a new party, named Volner Party. Since then he was mainly voting the same way as the ruling Fidesz party. In November 2020, Fidesz proposed a change to the electoral vote which would require nominating parties to present a minimum of 50 candidates (out of the 106 districts) in order to be allowed a place on the national ballot. This was viewed as a measure against small parties without nation-wide representation. To everyone's surprise, János Volner proposed an amendment, requiring a minimum of 71 candidates. This was a strange proposal because the Volner Party itself only had 10 members and so they basically eliminated their own chances of participating. The other opposition parties reacted by forming a broad alliance, the United for Hungary.

On 22 January 2022 János Volner announced that his party would not participate in the 2022 election. Volner, consequently, lost his parliamentary mandate after twelve years. On 8 May 2022, he announced, that his party would be renamed the Huxit Party. Volner was appointed foreign trade attaché to the Hungarian embassy of Singapore by the fifth Orbán Government in December 2022.

National Assembly of Hungary
Preceded by Gábor Vona	Leader of the Jobbik parliamentary group 2016–2018	Succeeded by Márton Gyöngyösi
