= Force and Determination (Hungary) =

Force and Determination Erő és elszántság
- Leader: Balázs László; Zsolt Tyirityán
- Founded: 8 July 2017
- Merger of: Identitesz; Betyársereg (political arm)
- Ideology: Neo-Nazism; Hungarian nationalism Hard Euroscepticism; Antiziganism
- Political position: Far-right
- National Assembly: 0 / 199
- European Parliament: 0 / 100

Force and Determination (Hungarian: Erő és elszántság) was a far-right Hungarian nationalist political movement founded on 8 July 2017.

== History ==
=== Foundation ===
Jobbik had been, since its foundation in 2003, the main party of the far-right in Hungary, holding positions such as ethno-nationalism, a rejection of both capitalism and socialism, and even pan-turanism while also running a paramilitary group, Magyar Gárda, from 2007 to 2009. However, in the lead up to the 2014 Hungarian parliamentary election, Jobbik's leadership drastically changed the party platform in what they called "néppártosodás" with party president Gábor Vona promising to "cut the wildlings" in reference to the more radical members of the party.

During this transition, Balázs László and Zsolt Tyirityán, leaders of two smaller far-right groups, Identitesz (the Hungarian branch of the Identitarian movement) and Betyársereg ('Army of Outlaws') respectively, decided to form Force and Determination. They officially unveiled the movement and its symbols at a rally in the Budapest suburb of Vecsés on 8 July 2017, which the movement labeled the "unfurling the flag of the far right." Although the rally was poorly attended, with only 300 participants, Balázs stated "Tens of millions are added to the ranks of the Arabs, Africans and Gypsies who will show no tolerance once they realise the power that their demographic significance lends them," and that "Our ethnic community must come first... there is no equality" while Tyirityán stated "World history is made and lost on population, the fight for living space and the fight to hold on to living space," that "Anyone who says different is either delusional or lying. Any way you look at it, the strongest always wins" and that "I have race awareness. I am proud to be a white European... And I reserve the right to defend that." After his speech, Tyirityán signed a copy of Mein Kampf for an attendee.

=== 2018 election ===
The party sought to splinter the vote of Jobbik in the 2018 Hungarian parliamentary election, hoping to prevent Jobbik from winning any political victories. However, Cas Mudde, professor in the School of Public and International Affairs at the University of Georgia who specializes in far-right politics, correctly predicted that Force and Determination was a small regional block of dissatisfied Jobbik voters with no national presence, being isolated to the northern suburbs of Budapest, however, he stated that if these disparate regional blocks ran on a national platform, similar to what the Our Homeland Movement envisioned, that they might pose a serious threat to Jobbik and become a new rival to Fidesz.

The 2018 election saw Jobbik win 2 more seats in the National Assembly, increasing their share to 26 seats in total with 19.06% of the vote and became the second largest party in Hungary. Meanwhile, Force and Determination did not even register a presence in the polls.

=== Later history ===
The party gained Hungarian media notability again in 2021, when Tamás Horváth, editor-in-chief of the pro-government news website Vasárnap.hu announced that he was close to the movement and was a former member and also a former Identitarian, resulting in criticism to both him and the overall reliability of the newspaper. He also held the microphone for Balázs during the founding rally in 2017.
