= Csurka =

Csurka may refer to:

- István Csurka (1934–2012), Hungarian journalist, writer and politician and leader of the Hungarian Justice and Life Party (MIEP)
- László Csurka (1936–2020), Hungarian actor; see Csurka László (ungry)
- Russian term (derogatory) (Russian: чурка) for Caucasian and Middle-Asian people (from Chechnya, Dagestan, Ingushetia, Azerbaijan, Tajikistan etc.).
