= Tamás Sneider =

Hungarian politician

Tamás Sneider MP
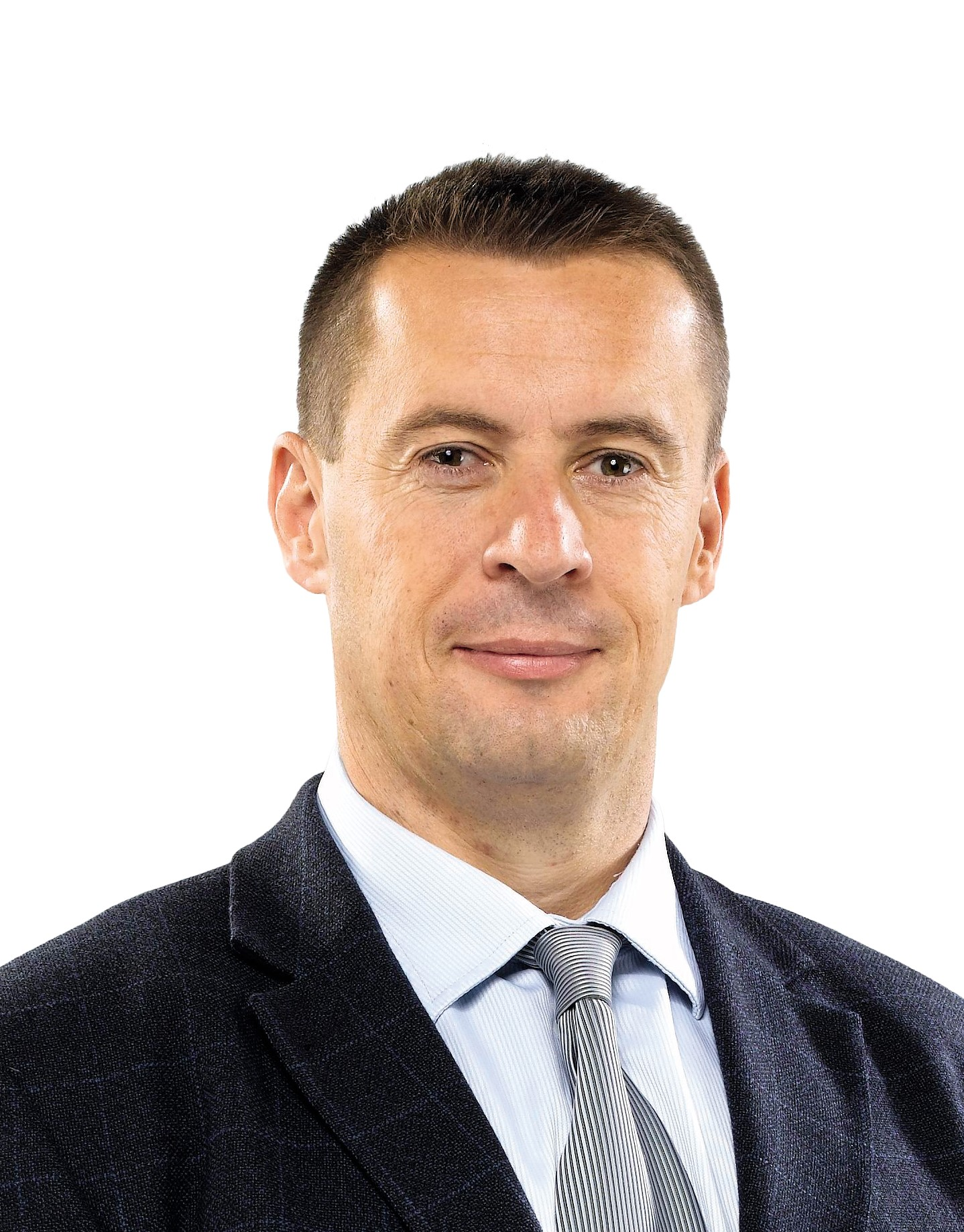
- Tamás Sneider in 2017

President of Jobbik
- In office 12 May 2018 – 25 January 2020
- Preceded by: Gábor Vona
- Succeeded by: Péter Jakab

Member of the National Assembly
- In office 14 May 2010 – 1 May 2022

Personal details
- Born: 11 June 1972 (age 54) Eger, Hungary
- Party: MIÉP (2000–07); Jobbik (2007–20); Civil Response (2021–present)
- Children: 3
- Education: Eszterházy Károly University
- Occupation: Politician
- Profession: Winemaker, Farmer

Tamás Sneider (born 11 June 1972) is a Hungarian politician, who was leader of the Jobbik from May 2018 to January 2020. Before that he was one of the vice-presidents of the party from 2009 to 2018. He was a member of the parliament from 2010 to 2022. Between 2010 and 2014 he served as the president of the Committee of Youth, Social and Family Policies of the Hungarian National Assembly. He was one of the deputy speakers of the National Assembly from 2014 to 2020 and member of the Committee on Social Welfare.

== Origins ==
Sneider's family has been living in Aldebrő in Heves County for 300 years. His ancestors were workers of German origin. His grandfather fought in World War II on the Eastern front and got wounded in the Battle of Torda.

== Education ==
He graduated in 1991 from Agricultural Technical College of Eger. Since 2009 he studied history at Esterházy Károly University, Eger.

== Political career ==
In 1992 he became a founding member of the Association of Patriotic Youth. Sneider was a leading figure of the far-right underground skinhead movement under the nom-de-guerre Roy in the early 1990s. According to a court verdict, he physically assaulted a man of Romani origin. The court sentenced him to suspended prison at the time.

In 2000 he joined MIÉP and became the president of the Eger branch. Between 2002 and 2006 he was the member of the city council of Eger. Between 2002 and 2007 he was the president of MIÉP in Heves county. Sneider participated in the occupation of MTV Headquarters during the 2006 protests in Hungary.

In 2007 he became the member of Jobbik and was elected as the president of the party's local branch in Eger. Since 2009 he has become the party's president in Heves county. In the 2009 EP elections he ran on the 16th place of Jobbik's list. In 2009 he was elected as the vice-president of the party.

Since 2010 he has been the member of the Parliament. Currently, he is the member of the Committee on Social Welfare. In 2014 he was elected as the vice-speaker of the Hungarian National Assembly with great majority.

Since 2018 he was the president of Jobbik. He was considered the moderate candidate to be the new leader of the party in the Jobbik congress, which followed the party losing the 2018 Hungarian parliamentary election. He ran against László Toroczkai. Sneider won the leadership with 53.8% of the votes.

In May 2020, he left the parliamentary group of Jobbik.

In February 21, 2021, he joined to the Civil Response political party.

During the 2026 Hungarian parliamentary election he endorsed Fidesz in the constituencies and endorsed Our Homeland Movement on the party list.

Party political offices
| Preceded by Gábor Vona | President of Jobbik; 2018–2020 | Succeeded by Péter Jakab |
