= Civil Guard Association for a Better Future =

Hungarian militant organisation

The Civil Guard Association for a Better Future (Hungarian: Szebb Jövőért Polgárőr Egyesület) is a Hungarian militant organisation involved in anti-Roma activities in areas such as the town of Gyöngyöspata in early 2011, where they have been accused of intimidating the Roma population with weapons and dogs.

The name originates from Szebb jövőt!, the regular greeting of the Levente (organization).

The European Roma Rights Centre has claimed that the Civil Guard has ties to the Magyar Nemzeti Gárda, a new group sharing the same ideology as the banned Magyar Gárda.

== See also ==
- Hungarian National Defence Association
