= MIÉP–Jobbik Third Way Alliance of Parties =

MIÉP–Jobbik Third Way Alliance of Parties MIÉP – Jobbik a Harmadik Út
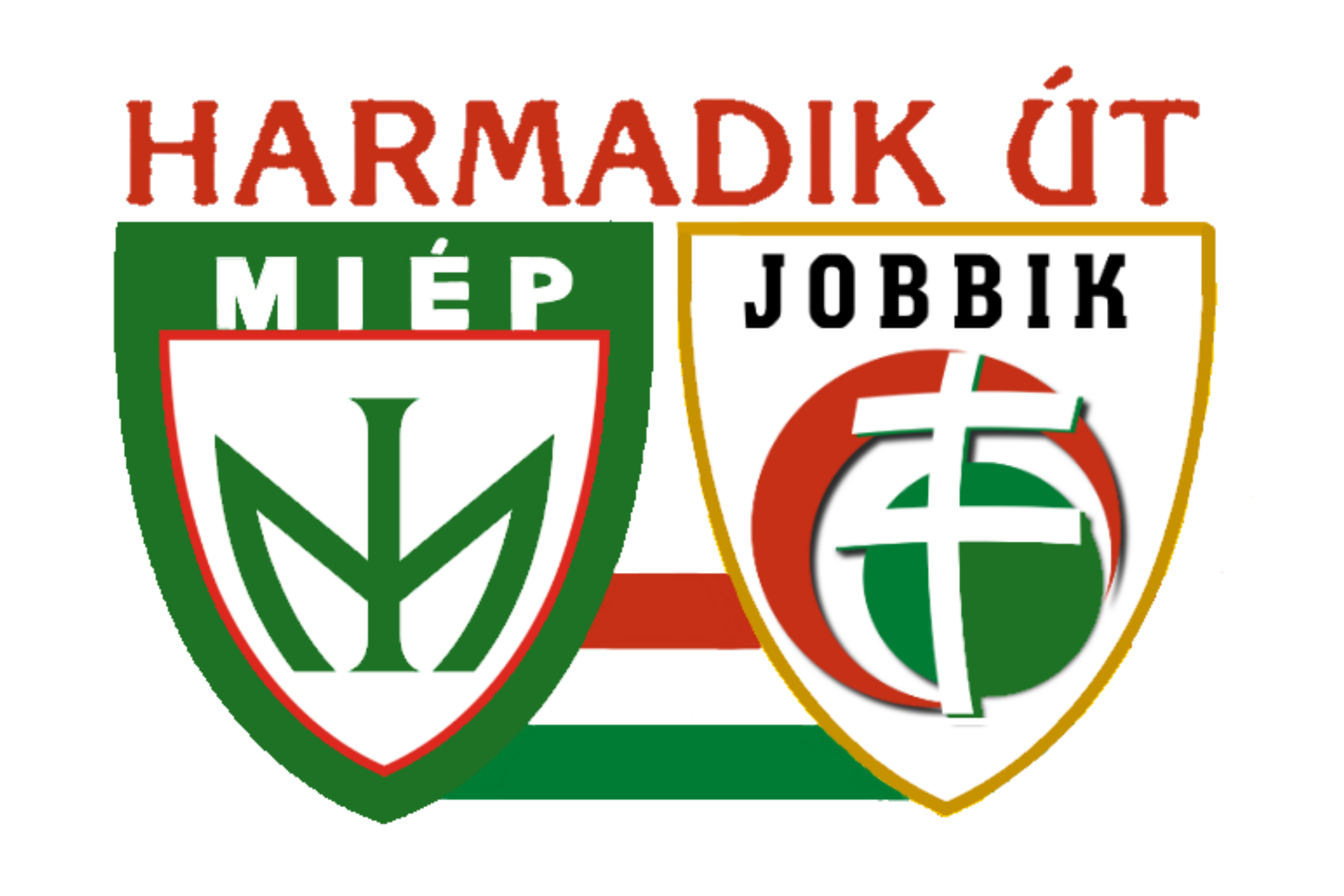
- Co-Presidents: István Csurka (MIÉP); Dávid Kovács (Jobbik)
- Founded: 7 October 2005
- Dissolved: 2006
- Headquarters: 1051 Budapest, Hercegprímás utca 4.
- Newspaper: Magyar Fórum
- Ideology: Hungarian nationalism National conservatism Social conservatism Hard Euroscepticism; Hungarian irredentism Third Position
- Political position: Far-right
- Colours: Red; White; Green
- Slogan: Megszállás, vagy Harmadik út (transl. Occupation, or Third Way)

The MIÉP–Jobbik Third Way Alliance of Parties (MIÉP–Jobbik a Harmadik Út pártszövetség) was an electoral alliance in Hungary led by István Csurka (Hungarian Justice and Life Party) and Dávid Kovács (Jobbik). In 2005, the Hungarian Justice and Life Party (MIÉP) joined forces with a newer political party, namely the Jobbik (Movement for a Better Hungary), and some members of the agricultural Independent Smallholders Party. The new political formation was registered under the name "Third Way" (Harmadik Út).

== Program ==
The common program of the electoral alliance from the Campaign Diary came out in 2006.

- The unfair EU accession treaty needs to be reviewed. Hungary can not be a colony!
- Hungarian land must be kept in Hungarian hands.
- The work of a nurturing mother of her children has to be recognized as a full-time profession.
- The party initiates family tax benefits and a total tax exemption for families with three or more children.
- The Christian churches are needed in the educating and teaching activities for children and the whole society in culture, education and the media.
- The survival of the Hungarian culture depends on the preservation of the Hungarian language.
- Giving dual citizenship to Hungarians living abroad and support their autonomy pursuits - Székely autonomy initiatives (Szeklerland, Romania), Vojvodina Autonomist Movement (Vojvodina, Serbia), Autonomy in the southern part of Felvidék (Slovakia) and Autonomy of Carpathian Ruthenia (Ukraine).
- Remembering on the memory of the tragedy of Trianon and on the Hungarian Revolution of 1956.
- Punishment have to be tightened in all areas.
- Restoration of death penalty.
- Revision of earlier privatizations, and invalidation of corrupt asset acquisitions.
- Property taxes for billionaires.
- Abolishment of tax incentives of multinational corporations, and obligation of banks to proportionate public burden sharing.
- Support of Hungarian entrepreneurs and producers.
- Stopping the massive settling of strangers into the country.
- Reducing the retirement age to 55 years for women and to 60 years for men.
- Reinforcing the defence and setting up a high-ranking, armed National Guard to protect the inner order and against external attacks.

== Results ==
At the 2006 legislative election, April 9 and 23, the party won 2.2% of the popular vote and no seats. The alliance broke up shortly thereafter.

=== National Assembly ===
Election	Votes			Seats		Rank	Government	Leader of the national list
Election	#	%	±pp	#	+/−	Rank	Government	Leader of the national list
2006	119,007	2.20%	–	0 / 386	±0	5th	extra-parliamentary	–

== Sources ==
- Vida, István (2011). Magyarországi politikai pártok lexikona (1846–2010) [Encyclopedia of the Political Parties in Hungary (1846–2010)] (in Hungarian). Gondolat Kiadó. ISBN 978-963-693-276-3.
