= Dávid Kovács =

Hungarian politician

President of Jobbik
- In office 24 October 2003 – 25 November 2006
- Preceded by: Party established
- Succeeded by: Gábor Vona

Personal details
- Born: 15 March 1976 (age 50) Budapest, Hungary
- Party: MIÉP (1994–2003); Jobbik (2003–2008)
- Education: Eötvös Loránd University
- Occupation: Politician
- Profession: History teacher

Dávid Kovács (born 15 March 1976 in Budapest) is a Hungarian politician, historian and former founding member of the Jobbik – Movement for a Better Hungary. He served as inaugural president of the party from 2003 to 2006. After resigning of politics in 2008, he became an assistant professor of history at the "Károli Gáspár" University of the Reformed Church Hungary.

== Biography ==
Dávid Kovács was born in Budapest on 15 March 1976 as the younger son of Dr. Etele Kovács, Vice Dean at the University of Physical Education (TF) and Valéria Végh, a former elementary school teacher.

During his presidency the Jobbik established a coalition with the Hungarian Justice and Life Party (see: MIÉP–Jobbik Third Way Alliance of Parties) for the 2006 Hungarian parliamentary election. After the election, when the party alliance failed to win any parliamentary seats, he was succeeded by Gábor Vona, Kovács becoming one of the deputy chairmen of the Jobbik.

He did not support the establishment of the Magyar Gárda, insofar as he left the party along with two prominent founding members on 10 March 2008.

Party political offices
Preceded by New party	President of Jobbik; 2003–2006	Succeeded by Gábor Vona
