= Zsolt Baráth =

Hungarian politician

Member of the National Assembly
- In office 14 May 2010 – 5 May 2014

Personal details
- Born: 17 July 1956 (age 69) Jászberény, Hungary
- Party: Jobbik (2008–?)
- Profession: educator, politician

Zsolt Baráth (born 17 July 1956) is a Hungarian educator and politician, who was the member of the National Assembly (MP) between 2010 and 2014, sitting as a politician of the far-right Jobbik.

== Biography ==
Baráth was born in Jászberény on 17 July 1956. He graduated from the local Lehel Vezér Gymnasium. He obtained his teaching certificate in 1977 at the Teacher Training College of Jászberény (present-day a faculty of the Eszterházy Károly Catholic University). He taught in Felsőörs, Aszód, Szolnok in various child protection institutions. In 1994, he completed his studies at the Eszterházy Károly Teacher Training College in Eger with a diploma in social pedagogy. In 2007, he graduated from the Gyula Krúdy Journalism School organized by the Association of Independent Journalists (FÚSZ).

Baráth joined Jobbik in 2008. He reorganized the party's local branch in Szolnok, becoming its president in October 2008. He was appointed president of the electoral board of the party's Jász–Nagykun–Szolnok County branch in January 2009. He was elected Member of Parliament via the party's Jász–Nagykun–Szolnok County regional list in the 2010 Hungarian parliamentary election. He was a member of the parliament's Committee on Youth, Social Affairs, Family and Housing from 2010 to 2014. He did not obtain a mandate in the 2014 Hungarian parliamentary election.

== Controversy ==
During spring 2012, Baráth caused an outrage by commemorating the 130th anniversary of the 1882 blood libel against the Jews in Parliament. The Tiszaeszlár blood libel, found later to be unrelated to Jews, was known as the first major anti-Jewish event in modern Hungary, predating the Holocaust. Baráth's speech, which presented the contemporary accusations as facts, caused controversy among Jobbik MPs: some – despite finding it inappropriate and uncalled-for – stated that in a mature democracy there should not be taboo topics, while leaders of the Jobbik Parliamentary Group told the media that they had evaluated the speech and learnt the lesson that they should care more about what their MPs say.
