= István Apáti =

Hungarian jurist and politician

István Apáti MP
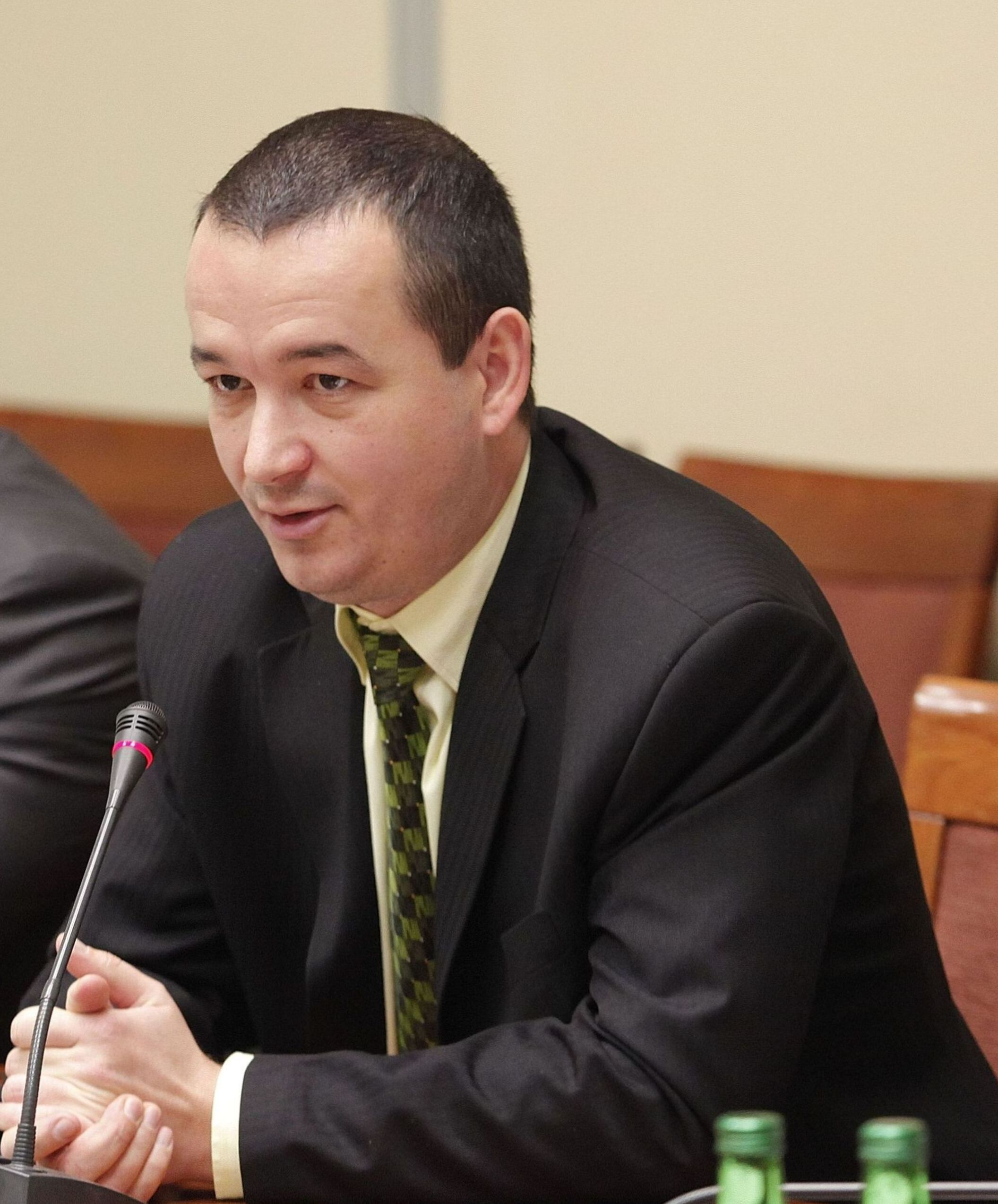

Member of the National Assembly
- Incumbent
- Assumed office 14 May 2010

Personal details
- Born: 23 March 1978 (age 48) Csenger, Hungary
- Party: MHM (since 2018)
- Other political affiliations: Jobbik (2005–2018)
- Spouse: Zsuzsanna Apátiné Pál-Katona
- Children: 1
- Education: University of Miskolc
- Occupation: Jurist • Politician

István Apáti (born 23 March 1978) is a Hungarian jurist and politician from the Our Home Movement political party. He left the right-wing radical Jobbik party on 7 November 2018. He has been a member of the National Assembly (MP) since 2010. He also served as Vice Chairman of the Parliamentary Committee on Local Government and Regional Development. Since 22 August 2020, he is the elected vice president in Our Homeland Movement.

== Personal life ==
He is married to Dr Zsuzsanna Apátiné Pál-Katona. They have a daughter, Zselyke.
