= Our Homeland Movement =

Hungarian political party

Our Homeland Movement Mi Hazánk Mozgalom
- Abbreviation: Mi Hazánk; MH; MHM
- President: László Toroczkai
- Vice Presidents: See list: Dóra Dúró; István Apáti; Dávid Dócs; Előd Novák; Zoltán Pakusza; Máté Tóth (politician); Csaba Balogh (politician)
- Founders: László Toroczkai; Előd Novák; Dóra Dúró
- Founded: 23 June 2018
- Registered: 20 August 2018
- Split from: Jobbik
- Headquarters: 1085 Budapest, József krt. 43.
- Newspaper: Magyar Jelen
- Paramilitary wing: Nemzeti Légió (2019–2020); Magyar Önvédelmi Mozgalom (2020–)
- Membership (2022): ▲2,500 – 3,000
- Ideology: Ultranationalism; Hungarian irredentism; Neo-fascism; Right-wing populism; National conservatism; Traditionalist conservatism; Hard Euroscepticism
- Political position: Far-right
- European affiliation: Europe of Sovereign Nations (since 2024)
- European Parliament group: Europe of Sovereign Nations Group (since 2024)
- Colours: Green; White
- Slogan: Minden magyar felelős minden magyarért! ('Every Hungarian is responsible for every Hungarian!') (Dezső Szabó)
- National Assembly: 6 / 199
- European Parliament: 1 / 21
- County Assemblies: 62 / 381
- General Assembly of Budapest: 0 / 33

Website
- mihazank.hu

Our Homeland Movement (Hungarian: Mi Hazánk Mozgalom [ˈmi ˈhɒzaːŋk ˈmozɡɒlom], Mi Hazánk, MH or MHM) is a far-right political party in Hungary. It was founded by Ásotthalom mayor and former Jobbik Vice-President László Toroczkai, along with other Jobbik dissidents who left the organization after the party's leadership moved away from its radical right beginnings and became more moderate.

The party ran in the 2019 European Parliament election for the first time but did not win a seat. In the 2022 Hungarian parliamentary election, it became the third-largest party in the country, with a result of nearly 6%, far surpassing public opinion polls. In the 2024 European Parliament election, the party continued to increase its support, reaching nearly 7%. The party again received almost 6% of the vote in the 2026 Hungarian parliamentary election, maintaining its 6 seats.

== History ==
On 8 April 2018, after the loss in the 2018 Hungarian parliamentary election, Jobbik president Gábor Vona, resigned and a reform congress was announced in the party. Toroczkai was the first to indicate his intention to run for the position of president, which was followed by the presidential application of Tamás Sneider, nominated by the acting presidency. Almost half of the congress delegates (46%) voted for the pair of László Toroczkai (president) and Dóra Dúró (deputy president). Toroczkai announced that he was forming a platform within the party called Mi Magunk.

The presidency announced that it would not accept Toroczkai's platform because it considered it against the constitution, although there was no such decision in the constitution. Proceedings were initiated against Toroczkai and Dúró, and Dúró was expelled from the faction and Toroczkai from the party. After that, Dóra Dúró alongside her husband Előd Novák, left the party and the Mi Magunk platform became an independent movement. As a result of Toroczkai's expulsion and the proceedings against Dúró, many Jobbik members and grassroots organizations indicated their withdrawal from the party or their dissolution. Some of them joined the new movement. On 20 August 2018, they announced their Founding Declaration at their celebratory event in Budapest's Városliget. On August 21, Dúró (as Deputy President) announced that the court registration of Mi Hazánk Mozgalom as a political party was legally binding.

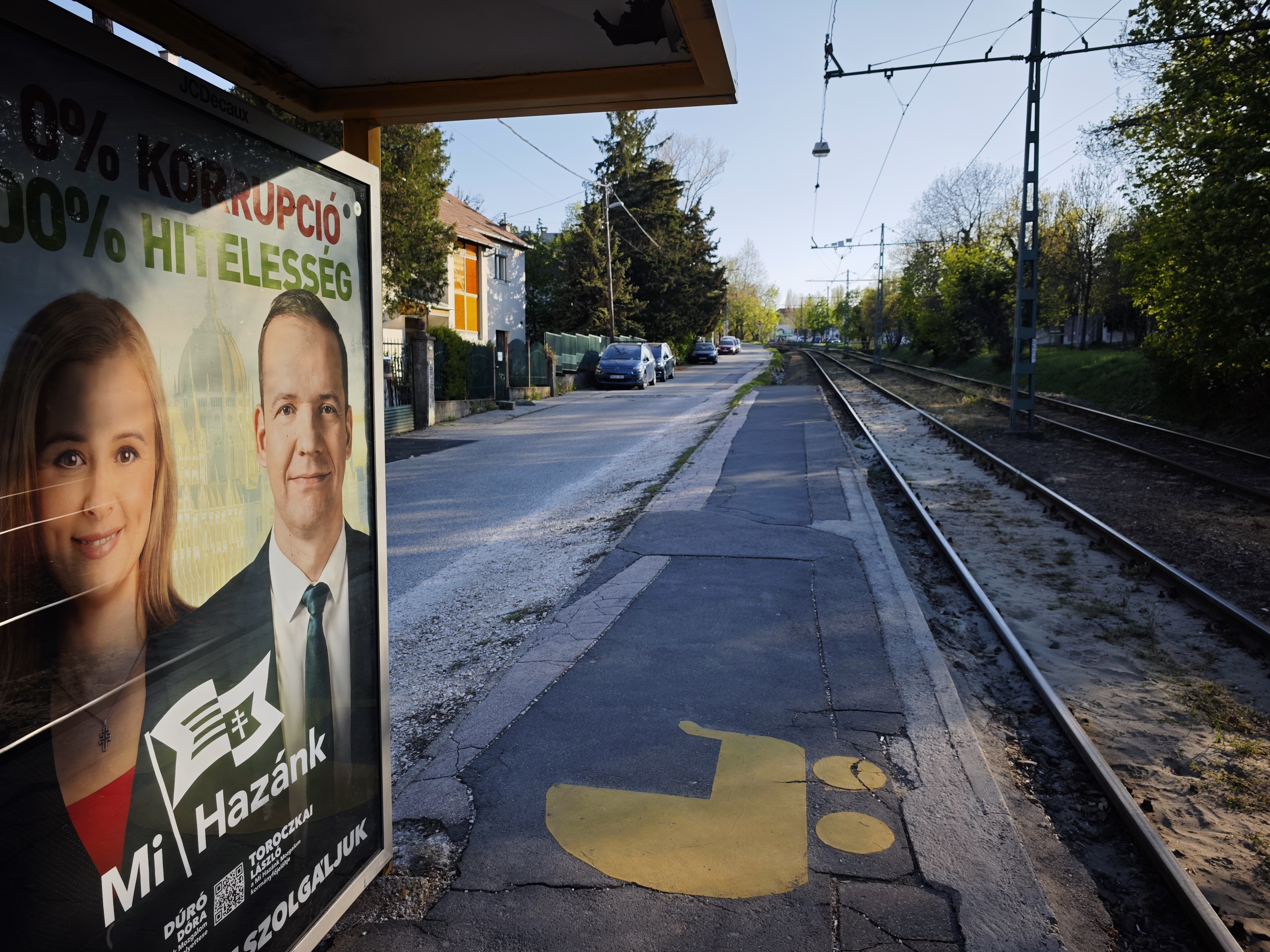
Party's electoral poster in Budapest during 2026 Hungarian parliamentary election

In early 2019, the party made an alliance with the right-wing Hungarian Justice and Life Party (MIÉP) and the agrarian Independent Smallholders, Agrarian Workers and Civic Party (FKgP). In 2019 Hungarian local elections, the party won 8 seats in counties' assemblies. In the 2022 parliamentary election, the party surpassed the 5% electoral thresold to enter the parliament, winning 6 seats and forming the third largest faction in the National Assembly. Also in 2022, the party hosted the far-right representatives of Alternative for Sweden (AfS), Alternative for Germany (AfD), the Dutch Forum for Democracy (FvD), and the Bulgarian Revival party at the Hungarian-Serbian border, describing them as "allies". Toroczkai (the party leader) and AfD's Stefan Korte, both held individual speeches at AfS's election campaign meeting held in Rålambshovsparken in Stockholm on 6 August 2022. In August 2023, the party organized a joint "Declaration for a free Europe of Nations" with the AfS, FvD, Revival, the Czech Republic's Freedom and Direct Democracy (SPD), and the Swiss Mass-Voll party, with a view towards forming a future new group in the European Parliament.

== Ideology ==
Although it identifies itself as "third way", opposing the policies of both the right-wing party Fidesz and the governing centre-right Tisza Party, the party and its ideology has been variously described as nationalist, right-wing populist, far-right, radical right, extremist, and neo-fascist. The party has anti-immigration, anti-Masonic, and pro-Russian views, and it has been also accused of having anti-Islamic, antiziganist, and antisemitic views. The party holds national conservative, traditionalist, and social conservative positions.

=== Economy ===
Our Homeland Movement positioned itself as agrarianist. According to the party, Hungary should become economically independent; to this end, the party would create hundreds of small and large food processing plants in the country and announce a new land distribution program. With the distribution of land, they would like to favor young Hungarians in particular. They would re-establish the Hangya Szövetkezet (Ant Cooperative), which existed in Hungary in the first half of the 20th century, whose task was to ensure that farmers achieved a good position in the market, allowing their interests to prevail.

The movement holds anti-communist views. The party demands the disclosure of agent lists, the accountability of party state leaders (for example, MSZMP leaders, KISZ secretaries, Workers' Militia, and ÁVH members) and their ban from public life, as well as the withdrawal of what they see as communist luxury pensions. The party considers the antifa movement a terrorist organization. They support the demolition of statues containing communist symbols, such as the Soviet Heroic Monument on Liberty Square.

=== Corruption ===
To curb corruption, Our Homeland Movement would abolish immunity. They oppose joining the European Public Prosecutor's Office, instead wishing to establish a Hungarian Anti-corruption Prosecutor's Office. The executive board of the organization would include prosecutors delegated by the government and the opposition, as well as non-parliamentary social organizations.

=== Diaspora ===
The party supports the autonomy of Hungarian communities abroad; for example, it supports the Székely autonomy movement and it also supports Hungarian Regional Autonomy. They would support education of the Hungarian diaspora in the Hungarian language from kindergarten to university, as well as the use of Hungarian national symbols. The party wishes to establish the day of the signing of the Second Vienna Award as a holiday, called the Day of Homecoming, to commemorate the territorial revisions recovered by regent Miklós Horthy.

=== Social issues ===
The party strongly opposes LGBT rights. After the release of a children's book, Meseország mindenkié, which features LGBT members and ethnic minorities as characters, Dúró referred to the book as "homosexual propaganda" during a press conference and promptly ripped pages out of the book and then shredded them. The move caused significant controversy and garnered international attention. The party has called for a ban on LGBT pride marches. Eventually, the Fidesz government banned pride marches in the country in 2024, resulting in the largest pride march in the country's history.

In 2026, then party vice president Novák attacked National Assembly member Mária Gurzó of the Tisza Party based on her Romanian ethnicity, stating "the interests of the Romanians in Hungary are above all else" for her and asking her if she had Romanian citizenship. Then Prime Minister of Hungary Péter Magyar questioned the usefulness of the topics raised by the party as he said it, with Romanian Hungarian historian and politician Novák Csaba Zoltán stating it was "absurd" and "pathetic" that in 2026 someone would have to explain their ethnicity in the Hungarian parliament, especially due to the sensitive situation of the Hungarian diaspora.

=== Environment ===
In an interview with Mandiner, Toroczkai described Our Homeland Movement as "a unique green party in Europe", and thus the party is sometimes referred to as supporting some form of green conservatism. Toroczkai further said that "we are unwilling to accept that only anti-social and anti-human liberal parties can be green parties. We think that those who do not want to protect our environment, our forests, our beautiful Great Plain, Lake Balaton, our rivers cannot really love their homeland."

=== Health ===
Amidst the COVID-19 pandemic in Hungary, the party protested against lockdown measures set in place by the government, accusing them of "inciting panic" and ruining the country. The party also promoted vaccine hesitancy, having launched a petition against the use of COVID-19 vaccines on children aged 12–15. In 2024, they called on the government to explore the possibility of banning MRNA vaccines, which they said are "responsible for many health problems and deaths". Previously, several politicians of the party falsely spread the claim that vaccines are "three times more deadly than the virus itself". They support withdrawal from the World Health Organization (WHO).

The party opposes all forms of mandatory vaccinations, and it has repeatedly called on the government to make mandatory childhood vaccinations optional. The party’s representatives have repeatedly accused the government and other opposition parties of serving the interests of “Big Pharma, the WHO, and Bill Gates,” and have cited the unsubstantiated claim that there may be a link between vaccines and autism.

=== Security ===
The party supports the reintroduction of the death penalty, and it also supports the reintroduction of conscription. They support the re-establishment of the Hungarian Border Guard, the development of the Hungarian national defence and military industry; however, they oppose the participation of Hungarian soldiers in international missions.

=== Foreign policy ===
In foreign policy, the party advocates closer ties with Turkey, the Arab states of the Persian Gulf, the BRICS countries, and Palestine. During the Russian invasion of Ukraine, the party referred to Ukraine as an "unfriendly country" and called on it to give up territory claimed by Russia "for the sake of peace". They did not support sanctions against Russia and voted against Finland's and Sweden's accession to NATO.

During a speech at the party's annual conference in Budapest on 27 January 2024, Toroczkai stated that the party would lay claim to the region of Transcarpathia in Ukraine if the latter lost its statehood as a result of its war with Russia. Toroczkai had already stated in 2022, on the occasion of the National Independence Day of Poland on 11 November, that he wished for Hungary and Poland to share a border again, posting a photo taken after Hungary's invasion of Transcarpathia in 1939 in which a Pole and a Hungarian shook hands at a border post.

The party advocates neutrality in the Israel-Palestine conflict and criticises the Fidesz government for its pro-Israel stance, with the party calling for an immediate ceasefire and two-state solution, condemning the death of civilians on both sides, and describing the Israeli invasion of the Gaza Strip as a "massacre". The party later invited the Ambassador of South Africa to Hungary to present its claim of Israeli genocide in Gaza at an event held at the Turkish Embassy, and advocated for designating Israeli settlers in the West Bank as terrorists.

Our Homeland Movement would initiate a referendum on Hungary's withdrawal from the European Union (EU). The party believes that Western European multinational companies take more profits out of the country than money comes in from the EU, and completely rejects the European federalism. Instead, it prefers nationalist nation-states, and as a result the party has been described as nationalist, as well as hard Eurosceptic.

In 2026, Toroczkai stated he considered it a life-threatening situation for Hungarians if Maia Sandu, then President of Moldova, voted in favor of Moldova's unification with Romania. He asserted that Romanian nationalists were already flooding the Internet and distributing maps featuring Romania enlarged not only into Moldova but also into Hungary up until the Tisza river. According to Toroczkai, this could only be prevented with the help of Russia, as Russian troops were present at the time in Moldova's unrecognized breakaway region of Transnistria.

=== Education ===
In education, the goal of Our Homeland Movement is to modernize the curriculum and reduce the amount of current curriculum. The party believes that IT, English, and physical education should be given priority. In addition, they consider the nationalist education of young Hungarians and their education for family life to be important. They support the creation of Christian and nationalist children's movements, such as Levente. In the summer of 2023, they started such camps in several settlements of the country. The party supports the segregation of Hungarian and Roma pupils in educational institutions; however, according to the party's official position, students would be segregated based on their behavior rather than their nationality.

== Organizational structure ==
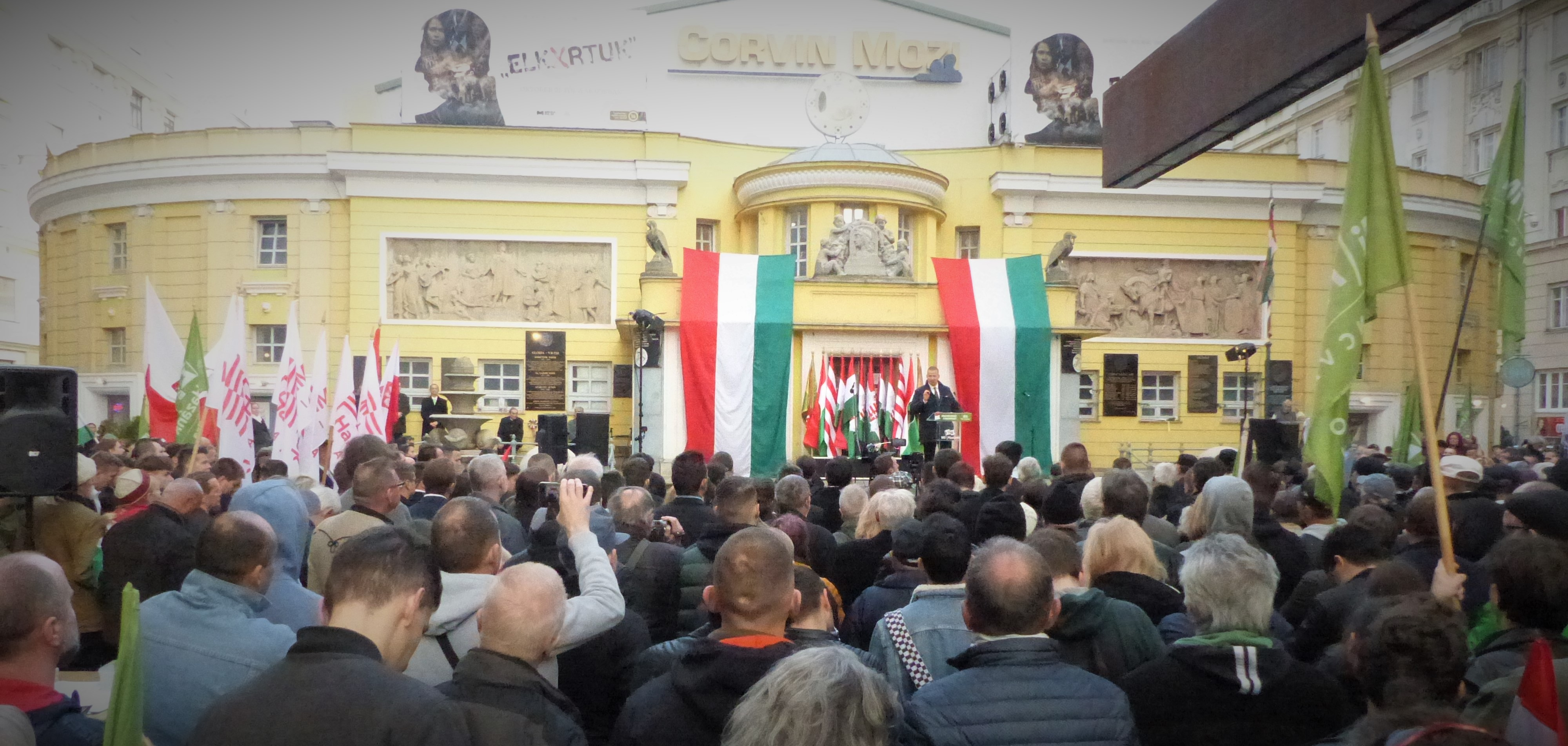
László Toroczkai speaking at Corvin köz

=== Leaders ===
	Image	Name	Entered office	Left office	Length of Leadership
1		László Toroczkai	23 June 2018	present	8 years, 4 months and 8 days

=== Membership ===
Number of members of Our Homeland Movement
Year	Membership
2019	▲1,000
2020	▲1,300
2022	▲2,500–3,000
2023	▲3,500–4,000

=== Paramilitary wing ===
In May 2019, it was announced the party would be forming the National Legion, a uniformed "self-defense" group similar to Magyar Gárda, the paramilitary wing of Jobbik, which was banned in 2009. The National Legion ceased to exist a year later, and its members merged into the Hungarian Self-Defense Movement, which operated independently of the party.

== Electoral results ==
=== National Assembly ===
Election	Leader	Constituency		Party list		Seats	+/–	Status
Election	Leader	Votes	%	Votes	%	Seats	+/–	Status
2022	László Toroczkai	307,064	5.71 (3rd)	332,487	5.88 (#3)	6 / 199	New	Opposition
2026	László Toroczkai	345,252	5.72 (3rd)	358,372	5.63 (#3)	6 / 199	0	Opposition

=== European Parliament ===
Election	List leader	Votes	%	Seats	+/−	EP Group
2019	László Toroczkai	114,156	3.29 (6th)	0 / 21	New	–
2024	László Toroczkai	306,404	6.71 (4th)	1 / 21	▲1	ESN

== See also ==
- List of political parties in Hungary
