= Jobbik =

Hungarian political party

Movement for a Better Hungary Jobbik Magyarországért Mozgalom
- President: Béla Adorján
- Deputy President: Koloman Brenner
- Vice Presidents: Balázs Ander; Attila Kesztyűs; Attila Révi; Anita Kvárik; László György Lukács; Dániel Z. Kárpát
- Chairman of the Board: Zoltán Lejer
- Parliamentary leader: László György Lukács
- Founders: Gábor Vona; Gergely Pongrátz; Dávid Kovács
- Founded: 24 October 2003
- Headquarters: 1034 Budapest, Bécsi út 120.
- Newspaper: Hazai Pálya
- Youth wing: Jobbik Young Section
- Paramilitary wing: Magyar Gárda (2007–2009)
- Membership (2019): ▼13,000
- Ideology: Conservatism; Hungarian nationalism; Pro-Europeanism; 2003–2014: Hungarian irredentism; Ethnic nationalism
- Political position: Centre-right to right-wing 2003–2014: Far-right
- National affiliation: Third Way Alliance of Parties (2005–2006); United for Hungary (2020–2022)
- European affiliation: AENM (2009–2016); ECPP (since 2024)
- European Parliament group: Non-Inscrits (2009–2024)
- Colours: Super turquoise
- Slogan: A Magyar Néppárt ('The Hungarian People's Party')
- National Assembly: 0 / 199 (0%)
- European Parliament: 0 / 21 (0%)
- County Assemblies: 2 / 381
- General Assembly of Budapest: 0 / 33

Website
- jobbik.hu (Hungarian); www.jobbik.com (English)

The Jobbik – Movement for a Better Hungary (Hungarian: Jobbik Magyarországért Mozgalom, pronounced [ˈjobːik ˈmɒɟɒrorsaːɡeːrt ˈmozɡɒlom]), commonly known as Jobbik ([ˈjobːik]) and previously known as Conservatives (Hungarian: Jobbik - Konzervatívok) between 2023 and 2024, is a conservative political party in Hungary. Originating with radical and nationalist roots, at its beginnings the party described itself as "a principled, conservative and radically patriotic Christian party", whose "fundamental purpose" is the protection of "Hungarian values and interests." In 2014, the party was described as an "anti-Semitic organization" by The Independent and a "neo-Nazi party" by the president of the European Jewish Congress.

From 2015 to 2020, the party started to redefine itself as a more moderate conservative people's party and changed the controversial elements of its communication, culminating with its new declaration of principles now defining itself as a centre-right and pro-European party, with some residual moderated nationalist tendencies (the position previously occupied by Fidesz). According to the party's "Declaration of Principles", Jobbik would "always focus on the interests of Hungary and the Hungarian people instead of a political group or an ideology. On the other hand, [Jobbik] reject[s] hatemongering and extreme political views that are contrary to Christian values and ethics." Foreign media remained sceptical about the efficiency of the ideological change with voices, arguing the change to be comparable to "a wolf in sheep's clothing".

At the 2018 Hungarian parliamentary election, the party polled 1,092,806 votes, securing 19.06% of the total, making it Hungary's second-largest party in the National Assembly. The party position was confirmed in 2022, while 2026 marked the first time it did not present an electoral party list.

== Name ==
The Movement for a Better Hungary more commonly goes under its abbreviated name Jobbik, which is in fact a play on words. The word jobb in Hungarian has two meanings, the adjective for "better" and the direction "right". Consequently, the comparative form Jobbik means both "better choice" and "more to the right". This is somewhat similar to the English phrase "right choice", which could mean both "a choice on the right side of the political spectrum" and "a correct choice". In fact, originally it was a pun, JOBBIK is the short form for JOBBoldali Ifjúsági Közösség (English: Right-wing Christian Youth Community). On 25 February 2023 the party's congress announced that the party legally changed its name to Jobbik – Conservatives. In September 2024, the party's name was changed back to Jobbik - Movement for a Better Hungary.

== History and development ==
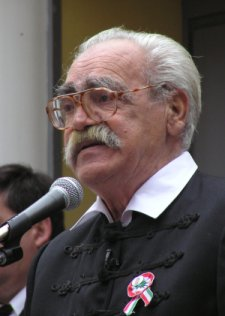
Hungarian Revolution of 1956 veteran Gergely Pongrátz, a Jobbik founder

Jobbik's party flag from 2003 to 2020

=== Foundation ===
The group was first established in 2002 as the Right-wing Christian Youth Community (Jobboldali Ifjúsági Közösség – JOBBIK) by a group of Catholic and Protestant university students. It was founded as a political party in October 2003, by Gabor Vona, the son of a staunchly anti-Communist farming family.. The new party elected Dávid Kovács as president, serving until 2006. A key figure was Gergely Pongrátz who, in a speech to the founding conference, invoked the Hungarian Revolution of 1956. Around Christmas 2003, Jobbik conducted a nationwide programme of erecting crosses, to remind Hungarians of the "true meaning" of the holiday. The move was criticized by several Christian intellectual groups.

=== Alliances ===
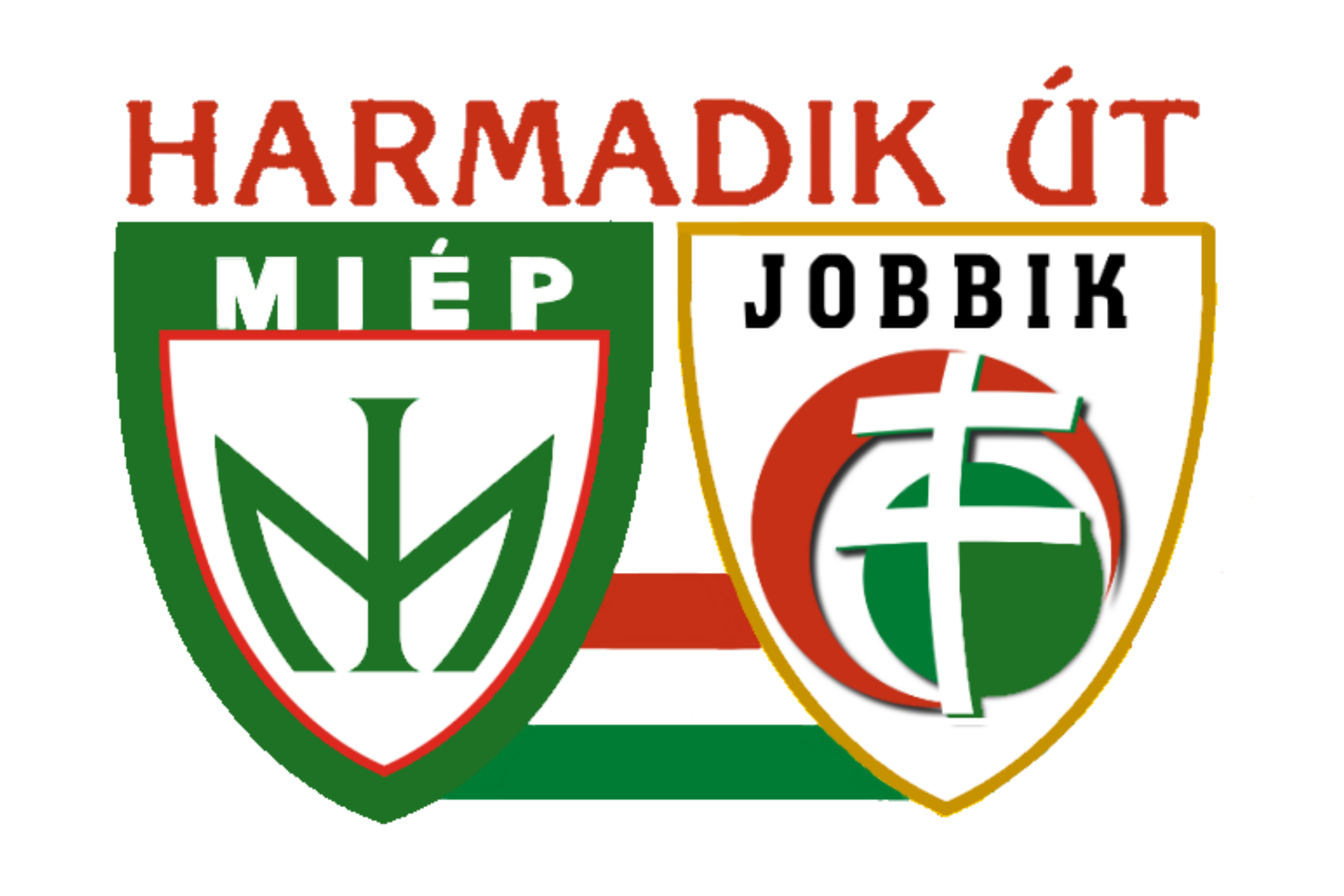
Logo of the electoral alliance

Even though the far-right Hungarian Justice and Life Party (MIÉP) and Jobbik had publicly quarreled, the parties formed an electoral alliance for the 2006 Hungarian parliamentary election, the MIÉP–Jobbik Third Way Alliance of Parties. The alliance sought to win votes from the major conservative Fidesz party; however, the alliance won only 2.2% of the votes, and Jobbik largely withdrew from it. In 2009 the State Audit Office (ÁSZ) reported the alliance for grave breaches of accounting rules. Jobbik blamed MIÉP alone for the irregularities.

Jobbik fought the 2010 and 2014 parlaimentary elections without political allies. In 2016, there were rumours that some unnamed influential figures were considering a coalition, which would consit of the left-liberal parties and Jobbik, to challenge the Fidesz government; however, Jobbik rejected the idea of cooperating with any other political party. Nevertheless, Gábor Vona said in an interview: "We will need several bridges ... to voters on the left, not to parties on the left. Jobbik offers a message, a program both to former leftist and former rightist voters."

=== Magyar Gárda and conflicts in the party ===
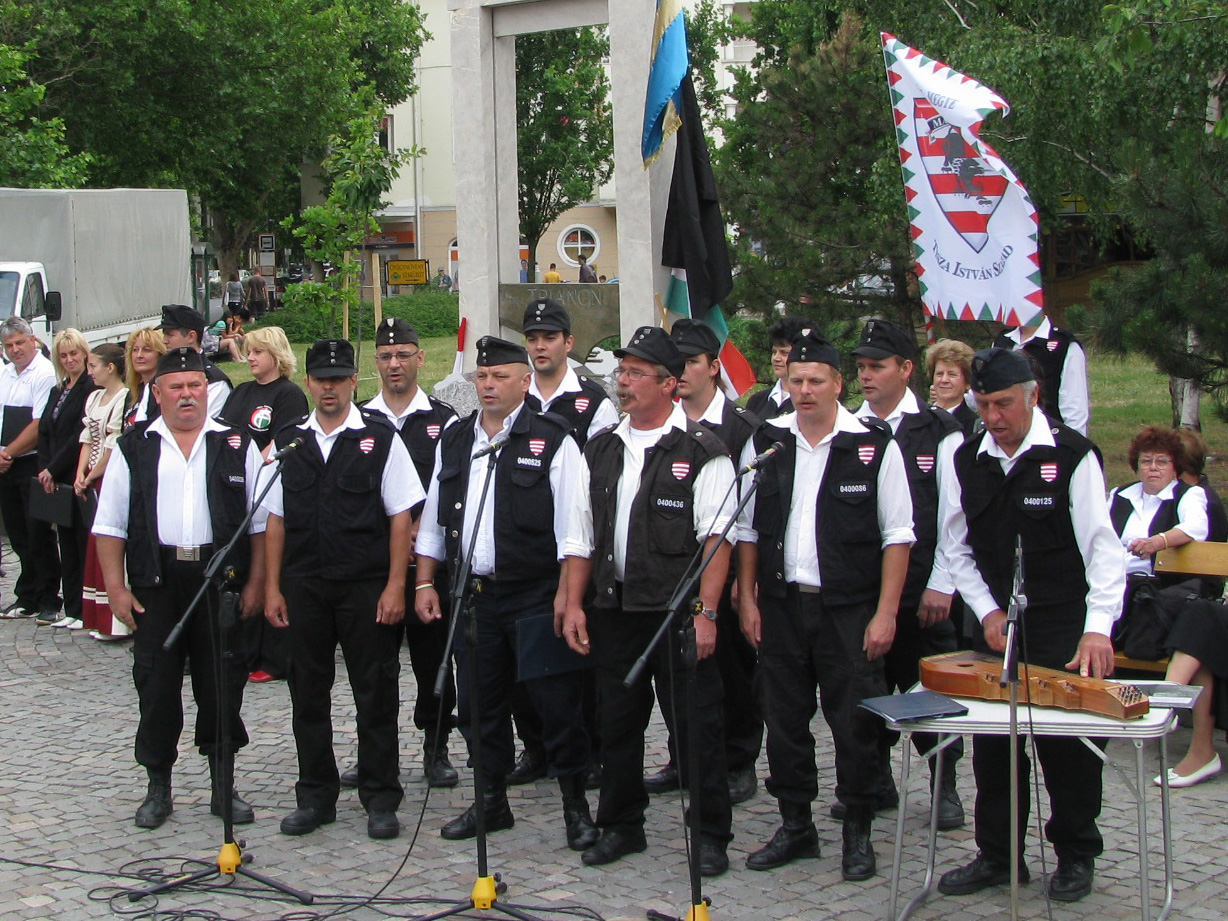
A Magyar Gárda choir sings in Békéscsaba.

During the 2000s, public order was a key topic in Hungarian political life; especially after the 2006 lynching of a Hungarian teacher by Roma people in the Eastern Hungarian village of Olaszliszka. The case turned public attention to the failure of Roma integration and the inability of the Hungarian police to maintain law and order in the Hungarian countryside. The idea of setting up a "national guard", similar to the National Guard of the United States, became popular among the conservative political parties of Hungary.

In June 2007, Gábor Vona – supported by the party – founded and registered an organisation called Magyar Gárda ("Hungarian Guard"). Its deed of foundation declared that it intended to become "part or core" of a national guard, to be set up in accordance with the Gabriel Bethlen programme, and to participate actively "in strengthening national self-defence" and "maintaining public order". Additional goals included supporting and organising social and charity missions, disaster prevention and civil defence. The foundation of the Guard caused fierce political debate.

On 10 March 2008, three leading figures resigned from the party: founding president Dávid Kovács, committee chairman Ervin Nagy, and former ethics committee chairman Márton Fári. They named the Hungarian Guard as the cause of their resignation, stating that "Jobbik has been merged inseparably with the Guard, taking responsibility for something that it cannot really control in the long run".

On 2 July 2009 the Metropolitan Court of Appeal (Fővárosi Ítélőtábla) disbanded the Hungarian Guard Movement because the court held that its activities attacked the human rights of minorities guaranteed by the Constitution of Hungary. The Guard has attempted to reorganize itself as a civil service association, the Magyar Gárda Foundation, engaged in cultural and nation building activities rather than politics. Its renewed activities are opposed by the Hungarian authorities, and prosecutors claim that the founding of the new organization is in contempt of previous court rulings. After several schisms, the organization has largely ceased activity. On 28 January 2017 some radical members of the Magyar Gárda held a demonstration against Gábor Vona outside Jobbik's year-opening event. Participants denounced the new politics of Jobbik as a betrayal of the right wing.

=== Moderating the party ===
Before the 2014 Hungarian parliamentary election, Jobbik began a new policy: the so-called néppártosodás (transition to a people's party). The party adopted a new style of communication while reversing many radical elements of its earlier program. In what could be seen as an example of moderation theory, Jobbik leaders declared that it turned from a radical right-wing party into a moderate conservative people's party. In an interview, party president Gábor Vona promised to "cut the wildlings", referring to the one-time radicals.

In 2016, the party pursued its strategy of de-demonization by abandoning parts of its original ideology and excluding certain extremist elements. The aim was to make its image more respectable and present a credible opposition to the conservative government of Viktor Orbán. Despite Jobbik's pledges, particularly to the Jewish community in Hungary, many left-wing intellectuals and political figures say they want to keep their distance from an organization deemed as undemocratic. Others, on the other hand – including philosopher Ágnes Heller – consider it necessary to ally with all opposition parties, including Jobbik, to defeat Orbán's Fidesz. Heller said that Jobbik was never a neo-Nazi party, although she described them as far-right and racist. At the local level, implicit alliances were formed between left-wing parties and Jobbik in partial municipal elections to defeat the ruling-government party.

Although the party was commonly described as far-right by observers and in the international press, from the mid-2010s it became more difficult to classify Jobbik in those terms, because of its policy changes, and also due to Fidesz's increasingly right-wing rhetoric. Support for Jobbik is particularly strong among young people. Since 2014, the party has consciously tried to attract young people who are disappointed with other political parties. An international survey, conducted in 2016, found that 53 percent of Hungarians aged between 18 and 35 years would vote for Jobbik; however, Jobbik's strategy – moving away from its far-right roots and staking out a more centrist position – has resulted in the emergence of more radical dissident formations, like the new party Force and Determination, or Our Homeland Movement.

=== Crisis after 2018 and cooperation with other opposition parties ===
Prior to the 2018 parliamentary election, Gábor Vona promised that he would resign if he could not lead the party to victory. True to his word, he resigned after the results were announced. Despite rumors that Jobbik would change its policies, the National Board of the party unanimously decided in favor of the moderate, conservative policies. On 12 May 2018 the party elected Tamás Sneider as the president and Márton Gyöngyösi as the executive vice-president of the party. The Hungarian press saw this as a victory for the moderate wing. Tamás Sneider announced that he wanted to build a socially conscious party, based on the teachings of Christianity.

Sneider's rival for the leadership of the party, László Toroczkai, received 46.2% of the votes. He threatened to split the party unless it returned to its original policies. His platform included an end to immigration, stemming emigration of Hungarian youth to the wealthier west of the EU, a tough line on Hungary's Roma minority, and support for ethnic Hungarian minorities in neighboring states. When his proposals were rejected, Toroczkai formed a new party with Dóra Dúró: Our Homeland Movement. On 7 November 2018, László Toroczkai announced that three former Jobbik politicians – István Apáti, Erik Fülöp and János Volner – had joined Our Homeland Movement. In 2019, he reorganized the Magyar Gárda and made it part of the Our Homeland Movement.

On 12 December 2018, the Hungarian Parliament adopted an amendment to the Overtime Act (Often called "Slave Law" by the opposition) on a scandalous session. On this day, representatives of Jobbik, MSZP, LMP, DK and Dialogue in the National Assembly disrupted the legislation by hesitating, shouting, broadcasting and preventing the presidential pulpit from obstructing the vote. Following the parliamentary meeting, mass protests began all over the country, where Jobbik is participating together with the other opposition parties. Following the demonstrations, left-wing politicians, including the President of the Hungarian Socialist Party Bertalan Tóth, suggested that opposition parties, including Jobbik, should run on a common list at the European Parliament elections.

Jobbik participated in the 2019 European Parliament election in Hungary as a separate list. In these elections the party lost more than half of its support. These elections likely further motivated the party to collaborate with other groupings in the opposition. In the 2019 Hungarian local elections, the party in most parts of Hungary joined common lists with MSZP, DK, Dialogue and Momentum (in some cases, with local parties as well). Due to this, Jobbik candidates (who stood as independents) managed to win mayorships in Eger and Dunaújváros or more easily retained ones it held before (e.g. Törökszentmiklós). On 25 January 2020, Péter Jakab was elected president of the party. He received more than 87 percent of the votes.

During the 2022 Hungarian parliamentary election, Jobbik participated in the opposition alliance United for Hungary. Viktor Orbán's Fidesz won the election, acquiring two-thirds majority in the parliament again. Some analysts claimed that the majority of Jobbik voters turned out for Fidesz or Our Homeland Movement instead of the united opposition. Prime minister candidate of the alliance, Péter Márki-Zay shared this assessment, admitting that the united opposition may have lost up to "two thirds" of Jobbik voters. By the summer of the same year, MEP Márton Gyöngyösi won the party's leadership contest. On 6 June 2023, Ágnes Kunhalmi announced that Jobbik left from the United for Hungary alliance. Jobbik participated in the 2024 European Parliament election in Hungary as a separate list. In these elections the party got less than 1% of the vote, down from the 6% it got in 2019. In March 2026, Jobbik failed to collect enough signatures to set up a list for the 2026 Hungarian parliamentary election, making this the first election since 2006 where the Jobbik list was not on the ballot.

Old logo until 2023

Old logo without text until 2023

== Platform and ideology ==
On 30 June 2020, Péter Jakab the president of Jobbik and Koloman Brenner member of the strategic group of the party introduced a new declaration of principles of the party, replacing its previous hardline nationalist-populist, hard Eurosceptic, anti-globalist, and irredentist one. The party redefined itself as a Christian, conservative, centre-right, and socially sensitive people's party in the document. The document defines Jobbik as the only people's party in Hungary, and stated that "Jobbik is an independent political movement that strictly observes its own values but is willing to cooperate with other political forces to restore democracy and the rule of law in Hungary." Since its adoption of more moderate policies, Jobbik has been described as centrist, centre-right, and right-wing. It also stated its support for agrarianism.

Currently, the party describes itself as a modern conservative people's party. A 28 February 2020 opinion poll by IDEA for Euronews was analyzed by leading political scientist Balázs Böcskei. He interpreted that from a former nationalist party, Jobbik has completed its transformation into a moderate people's party and its voting base has been changed, and now competes for a predominantly moderate conservative pro-EU constituency.

Since 2014, the party has not used the "radical right-wing" term to define itself, stating that it aims to represent all Hungarian people, not exclusively the right wing of the political spectrum. According to Gábor Vona, the president of Jobbik, after 2014 the party has grown out of its "adolescence" and reached its adulthood. The party has significantly changed its views on the European Union, while in internal politics the party has started to emphasize opening towards the different groups of the Hungarian society. At the same time, Vona distanced the party from "wrong statements" that it had made in the past.

=== Historical ===
Prior to 2020, Jobbik was described by media and academics as right-wing, far-right, and extreme right-wing political party. Earlier, the party often defined itself as "a principled, conservative and radically patriotic Christian party", whose "fundamental purpose" was the protection of "Hungarian values and interests". Since then, Jobbik has implemented major changes in its program and policies, due to its growing popularity and broadening supporter groups. Earlier Jobbik's ideology has been described by political scholars as right-wing populist, whose strategy "relies on a combination of ethno-nationalism with anti-elitist and populist rhetoric and a radical critique of existing political institutions".

For its part, Jobbik rejected the common classification of the political spectrum in left and right, and has been described as a catch-all party. The party sees itself as patriotic. The party has always rejected the term "far-right", and instead labeled itself as "radical right-wing". It has also criticised media companies for labelling them as "far-right" and has threatened to take action towards those who do. In 2014, the Supreme Court of Hungary ruled that Jobbik cannot be labeled "far-right" in any domestic radio or television transmissions, as this would constitute an opinion because Jobbik has refused the 'far-right' label. It also supported socially conservative and nationalist positions.

At its beginnings, Jobbik described itself as rejecting "global capitalism", as well as the European Union, about which they said they felt disappointed with the conditions of the Hungarian EU accession. While the party previously also opposed Zionism, the party's leader, Gábor Vona, stated in February 2017 that he has "never questioned Israel's existence", and that the party supports a two-state solution to the Israel-Palestine conflict. In July 2018, the party also voted in the European Parliament in favour of greater security coordination with Israel. At some level the party adhered to Pan-Turanism, an ideology that asserts that Hungarians originate from the Ural–Altaic race, and supported Hungarian irredentism. Consequently, the party strongly supports closer ties with Turkey, with Vona criticizing the 2016 Turkish coup d'état attempt and praising Turkish President Recep Tayyip Erdoğan as a "very strong leader".

By 2018, Jobbik was reported to no longer regard ideological issues as a primary goal but instead focused on the elimination of social tensions and controversies, as well as on the fight against the growing corruption in the public sphere and administration.

=== Modern conservatism ===
In the summer of 2016 Gábor Vona, the president of Jobbik, declared a new style of politics, called "modern conservatism" with the aim of moving beyond pointless debates between the right- and the left-wing and to fostering cooperation among Hungarians with different political backgrounds. According to Vona, the goal of "modern conservatism" is, to build a society that can, by its proactivity, be a basis for a more democratic political functioning. As a historical precedent, he referred to the ideals of István Széchenyi, who is considered one of the greatest statesmen of Hungarian history.

=== Relation to the European Union ===
Upon its formation, Jobbik had a strongly critical stance towards the European Union. The party regarded the accession of Hungary as a failure, and saw the EU as an organization that did not serve the interests of Hungarians; however, even in this period, the party did not refuse the idea of a radically reformed European confederation. After Brexit and the continuous debates on the future of the European Union, the party has reassessed its views on the EU and started to emphasize that by adequate policies and some EU reforms, the organization could be made advantageous for European nations. According to Jobbik, Hungary should join the Eurozone as soon as possible since it is a not a political but an economic question. At his press conference on 27 October 2017, the president of the party, Gábor Vona, said that if some conditions were fulfilled Jobbik could even support further deepening of the EU.

In December 2018, Jobbik presented its 2019 European Parliament election program, in which the party highlighted three topics of key importance: European cohesion, joint European solution on migration issues and centralized European action against fake news. According to the published program, Jobbik stands for Hungarian membership of the EU and advocates for a just union based on the principle of solidarity laid out by Robert Schuman and Konrad Adenauer.

=== Wage Union ===
Jobbik sees economic convergence and a pan-European wage union as important goals. Thus, a key element of the party's EU policy is the economic development of the eastern member states of the EU, thereby reducing the economic differences between East and West. The party believes that lack of development has led to corruption, and that both the EU and the governments of Central and Eastern Europe have turned a blind eye to the problem. Therefore, Jobbik played a leading role in the formation of the Wage Union European Citizens' Initiative, that started its work on 14 March 2017 with the participation of representatives from 8 Central European countries.

=== Economy ===
At its beginnings, Jobbik rejected globalised capitalism and the influence of foreign investors in Hungary. In the past, Jobbik has specifically opposed aggressive Israeli investment in Hungary and what it termed a selling-out of the country. On 4 May 2013, protesting against the World Jewish Congress's choice to locate their 2013 congress in Budapest, party chairman Gábor Vona said, "The Israeli conquerors, these investors, should look for another country in the world for themselves because Hungary is not for sale". This was in response to a highly-controversial speech by the Israeli Prime Minister Shimon Peres. On 10 October 2007, Peres said that "from such a small country as ours it is almost amazing, that we are buying up Manhattan, Hungary, Romania and Poland". This statement created a heated debate in Hungary and Israel was obliged to explain the controversial words several times.

According to the party's 2017 Manifesto, an innovative economic policy should be followed, whose goal is to find opportunities in the global economy. An increasingly-important point of Jobbik's economic policy is the creation of a more-competitive national economy that is able to provide higher wages. The party aims to support SMEs and a balanced development with multinational companies.

=== Public order ===
The party argued on its formation that the national police should be greatly strengthened and, along with the Fidesz, supports introducing a "three strikes law"; however, political rivals of Jobbik claim that its connections with the Magyar Gárda militia (which is now banned) cast doubt on the party's commitment to peace and order in Hungarian society, and even within party ranks. Jobbik have previously promised to restore the death penalty if they come to power.

=== Social and cultural issues ===
Jobbik continues to be a social conservative party. Although in opposition to the ruling Fidesz, Jobbik frequently votes with Fidesz on social, cultural and moral issues.

=== Minority rights and demands for territorial autonomy for Hungarians outside of Hungary ===
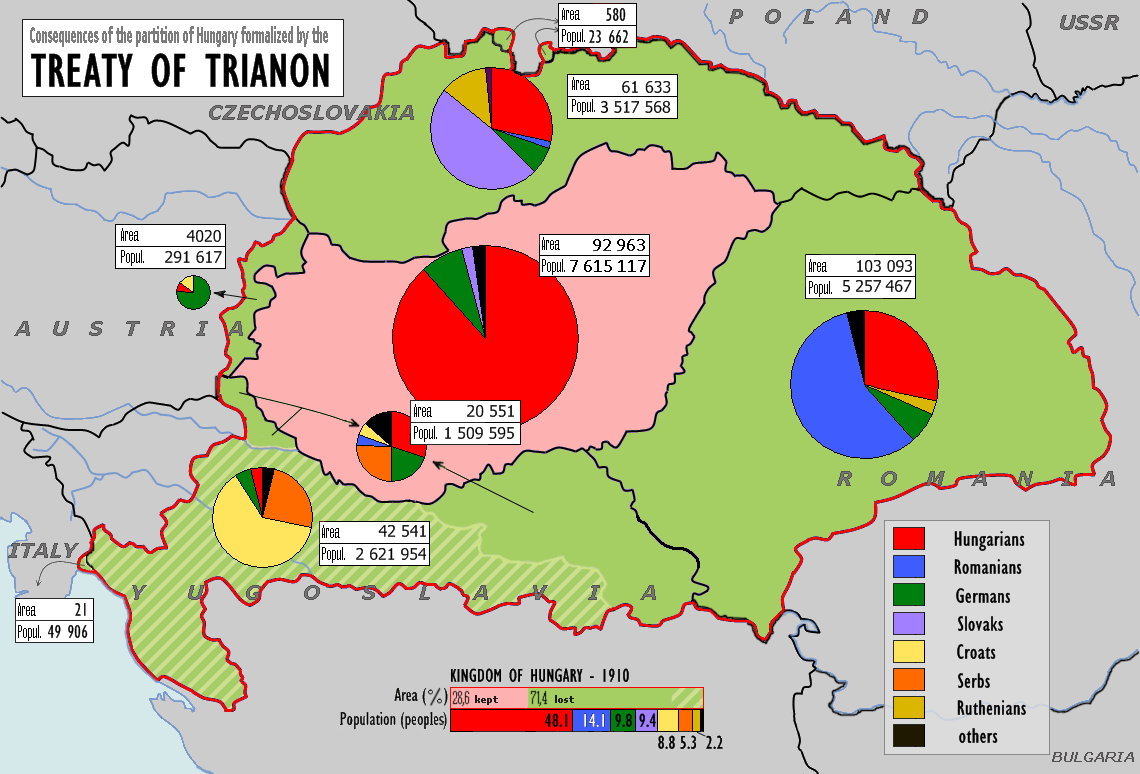
Hungarian losses of territory in the 1920 Treaty of Trianon. Ethnic Hungarians and their percentage of the population are displayed in red.

Jobbik strongly promotes the welfare of the large Hungarian populations living outside Hungary as ethnic minorities. The party demands minority rights for these groups in accordance with Western European standards. Along with almost all current Hungarian political parties, Jobbik demands the reestablishment of "territorial autonomy" in the Székely Land of Romania, and desires to make Carpathian Ruthenia an independent Hungarian district on the model of South Tyrol. Jobbik is frequently accused of agitating for a return to pre-Treaty-of-Trianon borders; however, Jobbik has never suggested changing borders by force, and believes that the ultimate solution is territorial and cultural autonomy within a European Union framework of minority rights.

One fourth of ethnic Hungarians live outside the country. Many suffer discrimination because of their ethnicity, causing frequent diplomatic disputes between Hungary and its neighbors. Jobbik dedicates itself to supporting the cause of Hungarian minorities in adjoining countries, vocally defending their schools, churches and cultural values. The party's slogan for the 2009 European Parliament election in Hungary was "Hungary belongs to the Hungarians" (Magyarország a Magyaroké!), which attracted scrutiny. While some critics dismissed the slogan as a tautology, others considered it a call to bigotry and complained to the National Electoral Commission, which ruled it "unconstitutional" on the eve of the election.

On 11 March 2014, in response to a demonstration in Târgu Mureș, the Romanian president Traian Băsescu publicly called for a ban on Jobbik members from entering Romania. Besides defending the rights of ethnic Hungarians living abroad, Jobbik actively supports the cultural autonomy and language rights of the autochthonous ethnic minorities living in Hungary. The party has a pragmatic stance on cooperation among the Central European nations and states and, despite historical differences, strongly supports their common action within the EU. Jobbik leaders have called for action in the framework of the Wage Union European Citizens' Initiative.

=== International relations ===
Jobbik was a founding member of the Alliance of European National Movements, alongside the French National Front, Italy's Tricolour Flame, the British National Party, the Swedish National Democrats, the Finnish Blue and White Front, the Portuguese National Renovator Party, and the Spanish Republican Social Movement. Its membership ended in February 2016 when Jobbik cut its affiliation with AENM. As of 2018, Jobbik had ties to the Conservative People's Party of Estonia, the Bulgarian United Patriots, the Latvian National Alliance, the Polish National Movement, the Indian Bharatiya Janata Party, the Russian Rodina, and the Turkish Nationalist Movement Party, although these connections began tapering off as the party moderated its platform and far-right factions began to split off. Jobbik has proposed joining the European People's Party, but was rejected in August 2018. Jobbik joined the European Christian Political Party in April 2024. Márton Gyöngyösi has been an individual member of ECPM since September 2023.

== Controversy ==
During its period as a far-right party, Jobbik strenuously denied allegations of antisemitism or racism, saying that the allegations were either politically motivated, or simply false. It also dismissed the criticism of perceived antisemitism, racism, and homophobia as the "favourite topics" of its political opponents. Even so, the movement was accused of playing on those fears.

=== Comments by members ===
On the eve of the 2009 elections to the European parliament, a comment was posted on a Hungarian political internet forum, allegedly in the name of Krisztina Morvai, who then headed the party's electoral list. Addressing their remarks to Hungarian Jews, the comment poster stated that they "would be glad if the so-called proud Hungarian Jews went back to playing with their tiny circumcised dicks instead of vilifying me." News of this comment, which was roundly condemned, spread rapidly around the world and eventually even featured in an article in The Economist. Morvai's critics pointed to her refusal to even discuss the issue, let alone deny it, implying that this was sufficient to ascribe authorship of the remarks to her; however, her supporters claimed that though she certainly had a record of being critical of the state of Israel given a sympathy for the Palestinian cause she developed while working as an international human rights lawyer, the idea of Morvai being an antisemite was "simply ridiculous", given that at the time of her alleged remarks she was married to a Hungarian of Jewish origin, with whom she had three children.

In a newsletter published by a group calling itself "The trade union of Hungarian police officers prepared for action", the following was allegedly printed: "Given our current situation, anti-Semitism is not just our right, but it is the duty of every Hungarian homeland lover, and we must prepare for armed battle against the Jews." The editor of the union, Judit Szima, was a Jobbik candidate in the upcoming election for the European Union parliament. Haaretz alleged that Szima "didn't see anything wrong with the content of the article." Cooperation between Jobbik and the trade union led by Szima was dismantled in 2010 and since then there has been no affiliation between them.

In the spring of 2012, Zsolt Baráth, a Jobbik representative in the Hungarian parliament, gave a speech about the Tiszaeszlár Affair which was widely criticized as antisemitic. The Tiszaeszlár Affair was an 1882 court case and blood libel where several Jews were accused and ultimately found innocent of murdering a Hungarian peasant girl. The court's verdict stoked antisemitism across Hungary. Baráth claimed, invoking an antisemitic dog whistle, that the judge had ruled wrongly in the case under pressure from international financiers. Baráth's speech caused controversy among Jobbik MPs: some – despite finding it inappropriate and uncalled-for – stated that in a mature democracy there should not be taboo topics, while leaders of the Jobbik Parliamentary Group told the media that they had evaluated the speech and learnt the lesson that they should care more about what their MPs say. After the incident, Baráth was not re-elected and is no longer an MP of Jobbik.

In November 2012, while evaluating the latest news on the controversial Israeli military action in the Gaza Strip, the party's deputy parliamentary leader, Márton Gyöngyösi, stated in his speech in the Parliament: "I think such a conflict makes it timely to tally up people of Jewish ancestry who live here, especially in the Hungarian Parliament and the Hungarian government, who, indeed, pose a national security risk to Hungary." Gyöngyösi admitted immediately after his speech that he had composed his sentence wrongly, and that he meant to refer to MPs with Israeli-Hungarian double citizenship, not to Jewish people. At the same time, Gyöngyösi offered an apology. As Al Jazeera reported, the incident led to "international condemnation of Nazi-style policies and a protest outside the legislature in Budapest. Around ten thousand Hungarians in Budapest protested against Gyöngyösi's antisemitic remarks. All major Hungarian political parties took part in the protest. At the protest, Attila Mesterházy, the leader of the successor of the state party of the communist era, the Hungarian Socialist Party, described Jobbik as a "fascist possessions virus", while 5th district of Budapest mayor Antal Rogán, representing the governing Fidesz party, described Jobbik as "evil". Jewish organizations responded to Gyöngyösi's speech by describing it as a reintroduction of Nazism into the Hungarian parliament and by describing Jobbik as a Nazi party.

In 2014, Tibor Ágoston, the deputy chairman of Jobbik's Debrecen and Hajdú-Bihar County organization, referred to the Holocaust as the "holoscam". Tamás Horovitz, the chairman of the Debrecen Jewish Congregation, and the mayor of Debrecen, Lajos Kósa, condemned Ágoston's remarks. Later, Ágoston harshly criticized Gábor Vona for not supporting Előd Novák and for cutting ties with the so-called "radicals" in the party. In 2015, deputy leader Előd Novák posted to his social media account on Facebook a picture of himself and his family next to a separate image of Rikardo Racz, the first newborn in Hungary of the year, who was born to a Romani family. In a comment on the pictures, he stated that the population of Hungarians would become a minority and suggested that the Romani population was the biggest problem facing Hungary. Novák's remarks were both condemned and supported. Novák later responded to the issue by refusing to apologize and suggesting that the family should apologize to him. Előd Novák was forced by the party's parliamentary group to resign from his position as an MP in 2016. Now, he is a vocal critic of Jobbik's new policies.

=== World Jewish Congress protest ===
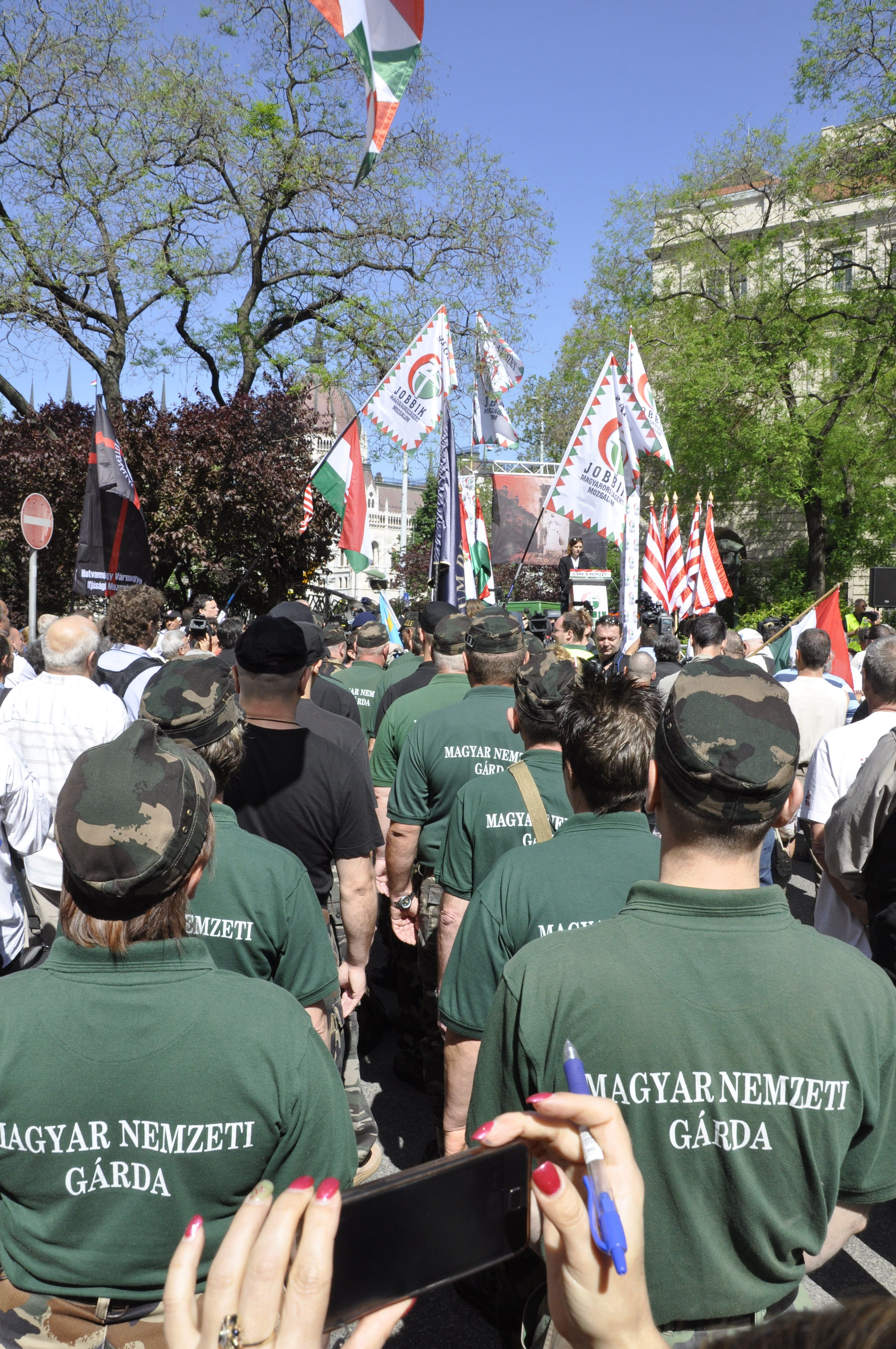
Members of the New Hungarian Guard stand at a Jobbik rally against a gathering of the World Jewish Congress in Budapest, 4 May 2013

On 4 May 2013, Jobbik members protested against the World Jewish Congress in Budapest, claiming that the protest was against "a Jewish attempt to buy up Hungary". Jobbik MP Enikő Hegedűs vociferously condemned both Israel and Jews at the rally as her husband, Lóránt Hegedűs Jr., stood nearby. An ordained minister in the Reformed Church in Hungary, Lóránt Hegedűs himself had served in the National Assembly as an MP of the far-right nationalist Hungarian Justice and Life Party from 1998 to 2002. He invited Holocaust denier David Irving to his Budapest church in 2007 as a "special guest", and was also accused of antisemitism on several occasions for statements he made about Jews at Jobbik events. At a 2011 rally, he claimed that Jews orchestrated World War II and controlled the international media, and a year prior alleged that the Hungarian government was secretly cooperating with Mossad to facilitate an Israeli takeover of Hungary with the assistance of Hungarian Jews and mainstream churches. After his wife's statement regarding the World Jewish Congress, the Reformed Church launched an inquiry into the minister's conduct, with presiding bishop Gusztáv Bölcskei denouncing Hegedűs's activism for Jobbik as a "permanent provocation" incompatible with scripture.

President of Jobbik Gábor Vona later stated that he had criticized Zionism as a political idea, and pointed out that he understood the Hungarian Jewish community had to survive such traumas during the 20th century that make dialogue very hard. At the same time, he emphasized that he wanted to have harmonious relations with the Hungarian Jewish community. In 2021, Ronald S. Lauder, the leader of the World Jewish Congress, stated that some politicians who "made anti-Semitic statements in the past are still aligned with the party".

=== "Hanukkah case" ===
In December 2016, Gábor Vona, in addition to his Christmas greetings to the nation's churches, as a gesture sent his greetings to his Jewish compatriots on the occasion of the Jewish holidays. Vona'a message raised controversy among Hungarian Jewish communities. Vona had already stated before that those, even party members, who had wanted to see Jobbik as a racist or antisemitic party had been wrong. However, Vona took responsibility for turning a blind eye in such situations earlier.

=== Warnings against "EU slavery" and ethnic shift in Hungary ===
Gábor Vona earlier said that Hungarians became slaves because the European Union had only wanted Hungary to enter the EU because of its cheap workforce. Vona also stated that "the number of Hungarians continues to fall while the gypsy population grows ever larger. This was not racism but a real social and economic problem. Anyone who doesn't understand this is not normal." In a 2016 inverview, Vona announced that he believed the EU also had some advantages. In a 2017 interview, Márton Gyöngyösi, deputy leader of the party's parliamentary group, pointed out that Jobbik seeks constructive reform of the European Union. In addition, Gyöngyösi also said that in order to have a more harmonized EU, maybe some national competencies, such as labor conditions and wage regulations, could be reconsidered.

=== Opposition to LGBT+ rights as "sexual deviancy" ===
Jobbik opposes the expansion of rights for LGBT people as contrary to their Christian-conservative model. The party maintains that the most important social unit is the traditional family. In April 2012, Jobbik tried to introduce a bill into the Hungarian parliament that would change the national constitution to allegedly "protect public morals and the mental health of the young generations" by banning the popularization of "sexual deviancy". The legislation was drafted by party spokesman Ádám Mirkóczki. This was to target "homosexuality, sex changes, transvestitism, bisexuality and paedophile behaviour". The proposed amendments would criminalise anyone who "popularizes their sexual relations – deviancy – with another person of the same sex, or other disturbances of sexual behaviour, before the wider public". The penalty would be three years in prison, or five years if 'popularizing' is done in front of minors. The draft legislation ultimately failed to pass. In 2021, Orbán's Fidesz government passed a similar Law to the 2012 Jobbik one, in the form of Hungarian anti-LGBT law. Jobbik has consistently opposed the annual Budapest Gay Pride march, on the grounds that it was "anti-Hungarian and anti-Christian". In 2014 right-wing protestors affiliated with Jobbik and the 64 Counties movement shouted homophobic remarks and suggested that LGBT persons should be taken to the gas chambers.

=== Support for Miklós Horthy ===
Hungary continues to grapple with the interwar period and the legacy of the one-time Regent of Hungary, Miklós Horthy. Jobbik, like other right and centre-right parties in Hungary, supported a balanced view, appreciating the positive elements of the consolidation after the World War I and Trianon trauma. On 3 November 2013, Márton Gyöngyösi and other Jobbik members unveiled a bronze bust of Horthy, a nationalist admiral who served as Regent from 1920 to 1944, in front of the "Church of Homecoming" in downtown Budapest's Liberty Square, where Lóránt Hegedűs served as pastor. The ceremony drew strong public and official condemnations over the legacy of Horthy, who led Hungary into World War II in 1941 on the side of the Axis powers (which the country had officially joined the previous year). Many Hungarians thus see Horthy as a source of deep national shame and as a Nazi collaborator, complicit in the murder of half a million Hungarian Jews in the Holocaust in Hungary. Others, however, revere him as a national hero, ostensibly for guiding the country to stability in its chaotic interwar period; at the ceremony, Gyöngyösi proclaimed Horthy "the greatest Hungarian statesman of the 20th century".

Several thousand individuals – some of whom had pinned yellow Stars of David on their clothing – came out to protest against the statue, and were met by a smaller crowd of far-right protesters near the church who responded with antisemitic and racist slurs. Mayor Antal Rogán condemned Jobbik's move as a "political provocation" that would allow the "western European left-wing press" to unfairly characterise Hungary as being plagued by antisemitic extremists. Hegedűs, who had already hung a portrait of Horthy by his church's entrance well prior to the statue's installation, defended Horthy's legacy to journalists after the unveiling, calling it "unjust and historically wrong" to implicate the former leader in crimes against humanity because he was suspected, not prosecuted, at the Nuremberg trials. In light of the furore over the statue, church officials announced that they would launch another official probe into Hegedűs's political activities.

=== Turanism affiliation ===
Jobbik had been affiliated with Turanism in the past, and has been criticised as a "Turanist Trojan Horse in Europe" by the European media. In 2013, the party's former leader Gábor Vona stated that he attached great importance to Turkish PM's Hungary visit by saying "As descendants of Turks, we value this visit". Another act of goodwill of Jobbik towards Turkey and Azerbaijan, two fundamental actors in hypothetical Turan, is that Jobbik's submission of a motion that aimed to "condemn the genocide committed by the Armenian forces in Khojaly and the Armenian aggression against Azerbaijan" to the Hungarian National Assembly as Márton Gyöngyösi, who would later become leader of Jobbik, stated in 2011.

While he was the leader of Jobbik, Vona was hosted in four universities in Turkey to give speeches in conferences. He emphasised the common ancestry of Turks and Hungarians explicitly by stating "We believe closer relations with Turkey will only benefit Europe. We do not agree with those parties that display an anti-Turkish and anti-Islamic stance. Turkey presents us with new opportunities. Turks and Hungarians share the same roots. Both are descendants of the Huns. If we stand against the Turks we will be standing against our own roots. The Turks are our brothers" as well as the importance of cooperation with Turkey to the EU as a whole.

== Election results ==
=== Growth and electoral success ===
The party faced its first electoral test with the coming of the 2009 European parliamentary elections. The election's results shocked their opponents: with the party sending three MEPs to Strasbourg; coming close to equal in number of votes with the governing Hungarian Socialist Party (MSZP) while eliminating their liberal coalition partner Alliance of Free Democrats (SZDSZ), to become the nation's third largest party. In London on 16 May 2008, the delegation of Jobbik's Committee of Foreign Affairs met Nick Griffin, chairman of the British National Party. They discussed cooperation between the two parties, and the elections for the European Parliament. Griffin spoke at the party rally in August 2008, while former vice-president Zoltán Füzessy is presently resident in Gravesend, Kent, England. The Alliance of European National Movements (AENM) was formed in Budapest on 24 October 2009. The alliance's founding members were Jobbik (the Alliance was established during their sixth party congress), France's National Front, UK's British National Party Italy's Tricolour Flame, Sweden's National Democrats and Belgium's National Front.

Since January 2014, Béla Kovács has been its president. Since then, Jobbik officially quit AENM and cut all ties with the members of the alliance. On 12 April 2015, Jobbik's Lajos Rig defeated the Fidesz candidate in a parliamentary by-election in Veszprém County. It was the second by-election lost by Fidesz after the national 2014 elections, leaving the ruling Fidesz-KDNP coalition two short of the parliamentary supermajority (kétharmad). On 14 March 2017 Jobbik started close cooperation with Bulgarian VMRO, Estonian Conservative People's Party and Croatian GO! as well as with trade unions, such as the Polish Solidarność 80, in the framework of the Wage Union European Citizens' Initiative.

=== 2014 Hungarian parliamentary elections ===
In November 2013, the party leader Gábor Vona expressed optimism about the election saying that the party planned "no less than election victory in 2014". He argued that Jobbik candidates had been faring well in local elections and that opinion surveys had shown that Jobbik was the most popular party among voters aged under 35. The party has prepared its election programme dubbed "We'll say it, we'll solve it", which focuses on guaranteeing people a livelihood, safety and order. Vona said his party would initiate a referendum on protecting Hungarian land and on amending Hungary's European Union accession treaty. On 26 January 2014, Vona held a rally in London where he sharply criticised the election law for preventing Hungarians living abroad from voting by mail at the parliamentary election.

=== Election results ===
==== National Assembly ====
Election	Leader	SMCs		MMCs		Seats	+/–	Status
Election	Leader	Votes	%	Votes	%	Seats	+/–	Status
2006 (Note: Run as part of the MIÉP–Jobbik Third Way Alliance of Parties coalition.)	Dávid Kovács	92,798	1.72% (6th)	119,007	2.20% (5th)	0 / 386	New	Extra-parliamentary
2010	Gábor Vona	836,774	16.36% (3rd)	855,436	16.67% (3rd)	47 / 386	▲47	Opposition
Election	Leader	Constituency		Party list		Seats	+/–	Status
Election	Leader	Votes	%	Votes	%	Seats	+/–	Status
2014	Gábor Vona	1,000,637	20.39% (3rd)	1,020,476	20.22% (3rd)	23 / 199	▼24	Opposition
2018	Gábor Vona	1,276,840	23.20% (2th)	1,092,806	19.06% (2nd)	26 / 199	▲3	Opposition
2022 (Note: Run as part of the United for Hungary coalition.)	Péter Jakab	1,983,708	36.90% (2th)	1,947,331	34.44% (2nd)	10 / 199	▼16	Opposition
2026	Béla Adorján	7,832	0.13% (6th)	—N/a		0 / 199	▼10	Extra-parliamentary

==== European Parliament ====
Election	List leader	Votes	%	Seats	+/−	EP Group
2009	Krisztina Morvai	427,773	14.77 (3rd)	3 / 22	New	NI
2014	Krisztina Morvai	340,287	14.67 (2nd)	3 / 21	0	NI
2019	Márton Gyöngyösi	220,184	6.34 (5th)	1 / 21	▼2	NI
2024	Péter Róna	45,404	0.99 (7th)	0 / 21	▼1	−

† 2009 seat winners:

1. Krisztina Morvai
2. Zoltán Balczó – his seat EP was taken over by Béla Kovács, when he became a member of the Hungarian Parliament in May 2010.
3. Csanád Szegedi – he left the party in July 2012.

† 2014 seat winners:

1. Krisztina Morvai
2. Zoltán Balczó
3. Béla Kovács – he left the party in December 2017.

† 2019 seat winner:

1. Márton Gyöngyösi

Mayoral, the last elections was in 2019

- Dunaújváros – Tamás Pintér (since 2019)
- Eger – Ádám Mirkóczki (since 2019)
- Encs – Gergely Mikola (since 2019)
- Jászberény – Lóránt Budai (since 2019)
- Kisherend – Zsolt Varga (since 2016)
- Ózd – Dávid Janiczak (since 2014)
- Szentes – Zoltán Ferenc Szabó (since 2019)
- Tapolca – Zoltán Dobó (since 2014)

== History of leaders ==
	Image	Name	Entered office	Left office	Length of Leadership
1		Dávid Kovács	24 October 2003	25 November 2006	3 years, 1 month and 1 day
2		Gábor Vona	25 November 2006	12 May 2018	11 years, 5 months and 17 days
3		Tamás Sneider	12 May 2018	25 January 2020	1 year, 8 months and 13 days
4		Péter Jakab	25 January 2020	8 June 2022	2 years, 4 months and 14 days
–		Anita Potocskáné Kőrösi (acting)	8 June 2022	2 July 2022	23 days
5		Márton Gyöngyösi	2 July 2022	29 June 2024	1 year, 11 months and 27 days
6		Béla Adorján	29 June 2024	Incumbent	2 years, 3 months and 10 days

== Membership ==
The number of members of Jobbik
Year	Membership
2009	▲5200
2010	▲10000
2011	▲12430
2015	▲17226
2016	▲17927
2019	▼13000

== Literature ==
- Kovács, András (2013). The Post-Communist Extreme Right: The Jobbik Party in Hungary. London/New York: Bloomsbury. pp. 223–234. ISBN 978-1-78093-343-6.
- Vida, István (2011). "Jobbik Magyarországért Mozgalom (Jobbik)". Magyarországi politikai pártok lexikona (1846–2010) [Encyclopedia of the Political Parties in Hungary (1846–2010)] (in Hungarian). Gondolat Kiadó. pp. 362–365. ISBN 978-963-693-276-3.
