= István Csurka =

Hungarian politician and writer (1934–2012)

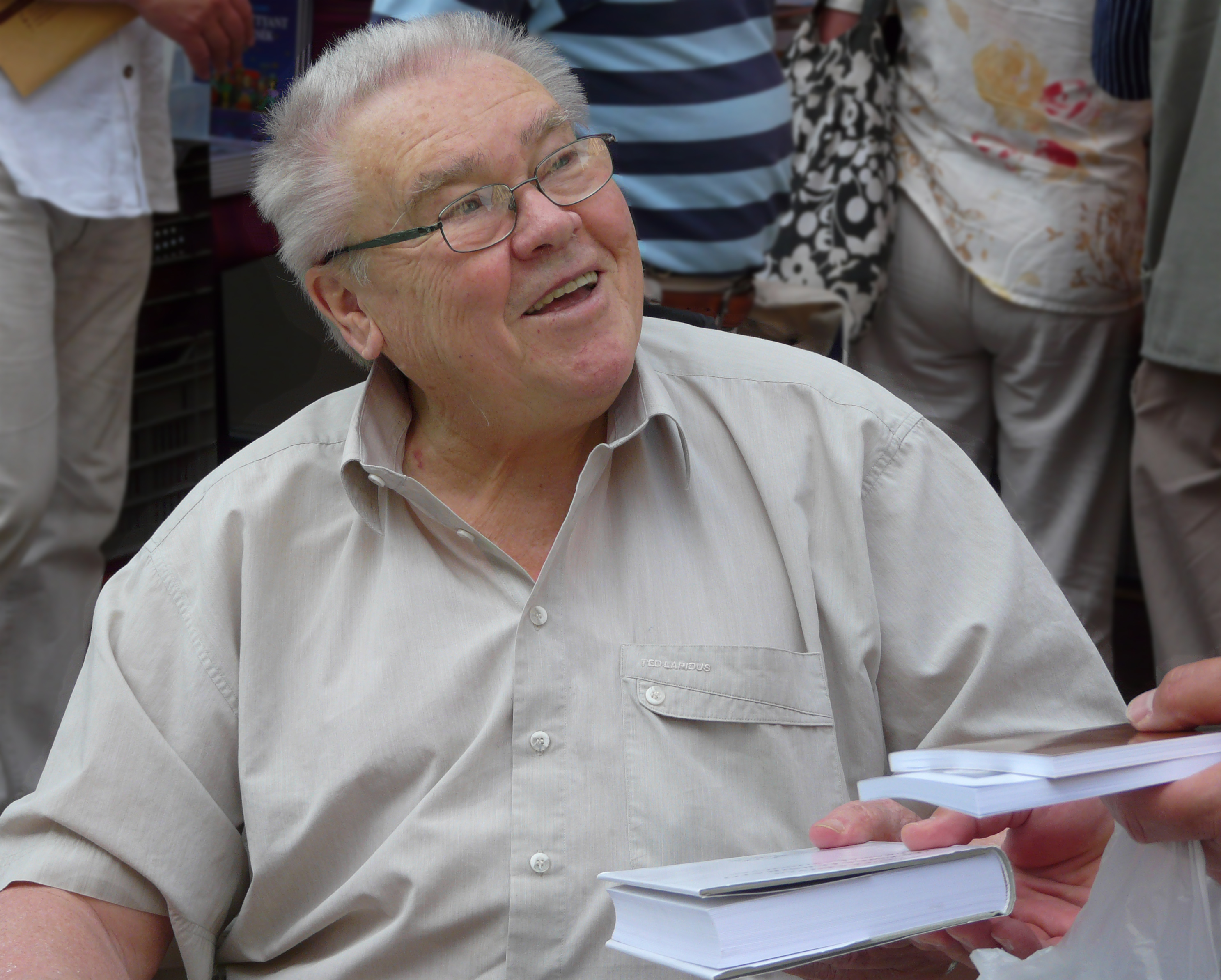
- Csurka at Bookfests in Budapest, June 2011

Member of the National Assembly
- In office 2 May 1990 – 28 June 1994
- In office 18 June 1998 – 14 May 2002

Chairman of the Hungarian Justice and Life Party
- In office 15 July 1993 – 4 February 2012
- Preceded by: New party
- Succeeded by: Zoltán Fenyvessy

Personal details
- Born: 27 March 1934 Budapest, Hungary
- Died: 4 February 2012 (aged 77) Budapest, Hungary
- Party: MDF (1987–1993); MIÉP (1993–2012)
- Children: Endre István; Eszter; Dóra
- Occupation: politician
- Profession: writer

István Csurka (Hungarian pronunciation: [ˈiʃtvaːn ˈt͡ʃurkɒ]; 27 March 1934 – 4 February 2012) was a Hungarian nationalist politician, journalist and writer. He was the founder and inaugural leader of the Hungarian Justice and Life Party (MIÉP) from 1993 until his death. He was also a Member of Parliament from 1990 to 1994 and from 1998 to 2002.

== Biography ==
Csurka was born on 27 March 1934 in Budapest as the first son of Péter Csurka, a journalist. His younger brother was László Csurka, an actor and director. He was interned after the Hungarian Revolution of 1956 for half a year. After that he was recruited as a III/III agent. In the early 1990s he was among the first to reveal his informant's past. He alleged that he signed the declaration of recruitment under a great deal of pressure at the time when he was subjected to internment.

He was a founding member of Hungarian Democratic Forum, and a member of the first elected Parliament of Hungary after the fall of communist-socialist regime. His life before the political transition was multi-sided: renowned novelist and drama-author, a source of critical opinion towards the régime but also an informant to the Hungarian secret police (reluctantly according to him).

In October 1994, he became chairman of the small Hungarian right-wing extremist party Hungarian Justice and Life Party (MIÉP), which defines itself as a radical national-conservative group, and had the support of 5% of voters at its peak [between 1998 and 2002]. Csurka himself is publicly associated with verbal antisemitism and saw himself as a representative of some 3 million Hungarians who live outside Hungary in the aftermath of the Treaty of Trianon. According to a report in The Independent about the right-wing cultural offensive of early 2012 he was "convinced Zionists had plans to establish a second home in Hungary."

He was rumoured to have sought a partnership with the centre-right governing party of Young Democrats (Fidesz) for MIÉP. However, its chairman, Viktor Orbán, repeatedly denied this and publicly rejected any of their parliamentary support as Prime Minister. After the elections of April 2002, Fidesz lost its majority and MIÉP missed the 5% barrier to enter the Hungarian parliament; therefore, such speculations became irrelevant.

In the fall of 2011, Csurka was named as intendant for Új Színház ("New Theater") in Budapest by the new director, Hungarian actor György Dörner, who is affiliated with the far-right Jobbik party. They were expected to make productions that move away from what Csurka regarded as, "the liberal-social-cultural policy... that is so oppressive". Later István Tarlós, the mayor of Budapest asked Dörner to reconsider hiring Csurka following an antisemitic screed.

He was hospitalized in January 2012. His last public appearance was in a pro-government demonstration in Szeged. He said that Hungary was threatened by unprecedented aggression. He also stressed the need to prevent the country from being diverted from the course set by a power backed by a two-thirds majority. Csurka died on 4 February 2012, aged 77, after a long illness.

== Personal life ==
He was married and had three children: two daughters, Eszter and Dóra and one son, Endre István.

== Sources ==
- Életrajz és program az Origón
- A MIÉP története
- "Hungary's right-wing war on culture". Der Spiegel.

== Further bibliography ==
- Csurka István: Vasárnapi jegyzetek. – A Kossuth Rádió Vasárnapi Újság-jában 1987 és 1991 augusztusa között elhangzott jegyzetek. Püski Kiadó Bt. – Magyar Fórum Kiadó Kft.; Bp., 1991. ISBN 963-7845-60-7 .

Party political offices
Preceded by New party	Chairman of the Hungarian Justice and Life Party; 1993–2012	Succeeded by Zoltán Fenyvessy
