= Magyar Gárda =

Hungarian nationalist group (2007–09)

Hungarian Guard Movement
- Magyar Gárda Mozgalom
- Seal of the Magyar Gárda, based on the Árpád stripes
- Leader: Gábor Vona
- Founded: 25 August 2007
- Dissolved: 2 July 2009
- Country: Hungary
- Allegiance: Jobbik (de facto)
- Headquarters: Budapest
- Ideology: Hungarian nationalism Antiziganism; Antisemitism
- Political position: Far-right
- Status: Illegal
- Size: 650 (2008)
- Website: magyargarda.hu

Magyar Gárda Mozgalom (Hungarian pronunciation: [ˈmɒɟɒr ˈɡaːrdɒ ˈmozɡɒlom], English: Hungarian Guard Movement), founded by Magyar Gárda Hagyományőrző és Kulturális Egyesület (English: Hungarian Guard Association for Preservation of Traditions and Culture) was a far-right nationalist paramilitary organization active in Hungary from 2007 to 2009. The organization enjoyed a close relationship with the Jobbik party, and was frequently construed as Jobbik's paramilitary wing before its legal dissolution in 2009. The president of the organization was Gábor Vona, also the president of Jobbik; prominent members included former defence minister Lajos Für and actor Mátyás Usztics.

== Ideology ==
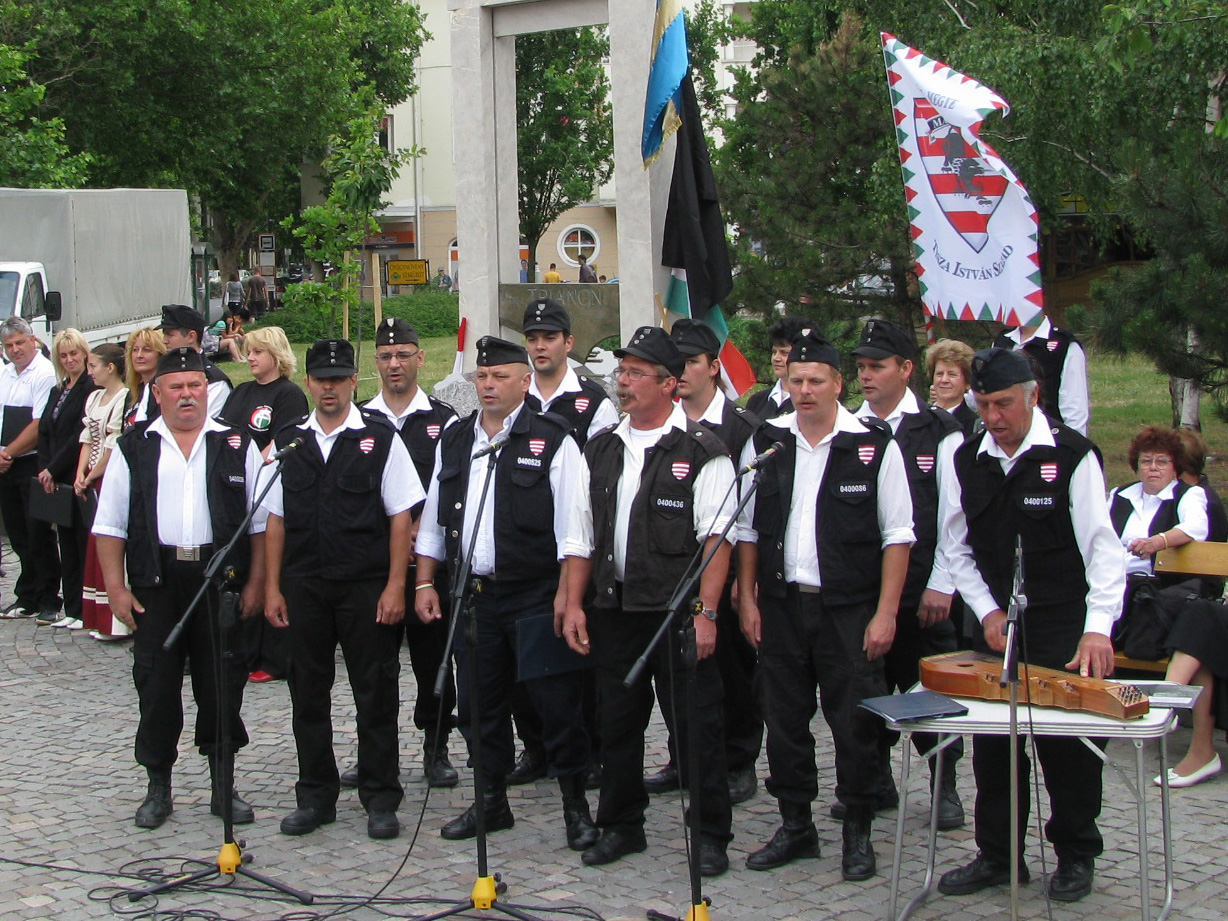
Members of Magyar Gárda gathered in Békéscsaba on Trianon Day, 2009.

Magyar Gárda was founded through an "oath of loyalty to Hungary" by its members in Buda Castle, Budapest, on 25 August 2007. The group itself claimed to aim at "defending a physically, spiritually and intellectually defenceless Hungary". The international press and its opponents, such as Hungary's former prime minister Ferenc Gyurcsány, have described the organization neo-fascist or neo-Nazi, similar to Hitler's brownshirts ("SA") in Nazi Germany and the fascist Arrow Cross Party in Hungary.

The Magyar Gárda is described by not only the Western European press but also the Hungarian press as a paramilitary organization, a civilian militia or party militia. On one hand, it was never armed; this is also occasionally acknowledged by those who call it a paramilitary. On the other hand, there was an occasion when Tamás Gergő Samu, president of the Békés County Jobbik organization expressed: "[…] if the Jobbik gains power […] the members of the Gárda will form the backbone of the [new] Hungarian gendarmerie, will be invested with public authority, and will march here, on the streets of Sarkad with weapons on their side".

The uniform was composed of black boots, black trousers with white shirt and black vest with the shape of a lion on its back and a coat of arms on the front, a shielded black cap and a red-white striped scarf. The Guard's coat of arms is based on that of Emeric of Hungary which features the Árpád stripes with 9 golden lions in 4 red stripes (3-3-2-1 lions per stripe).

== Relationship with Jobbik ==
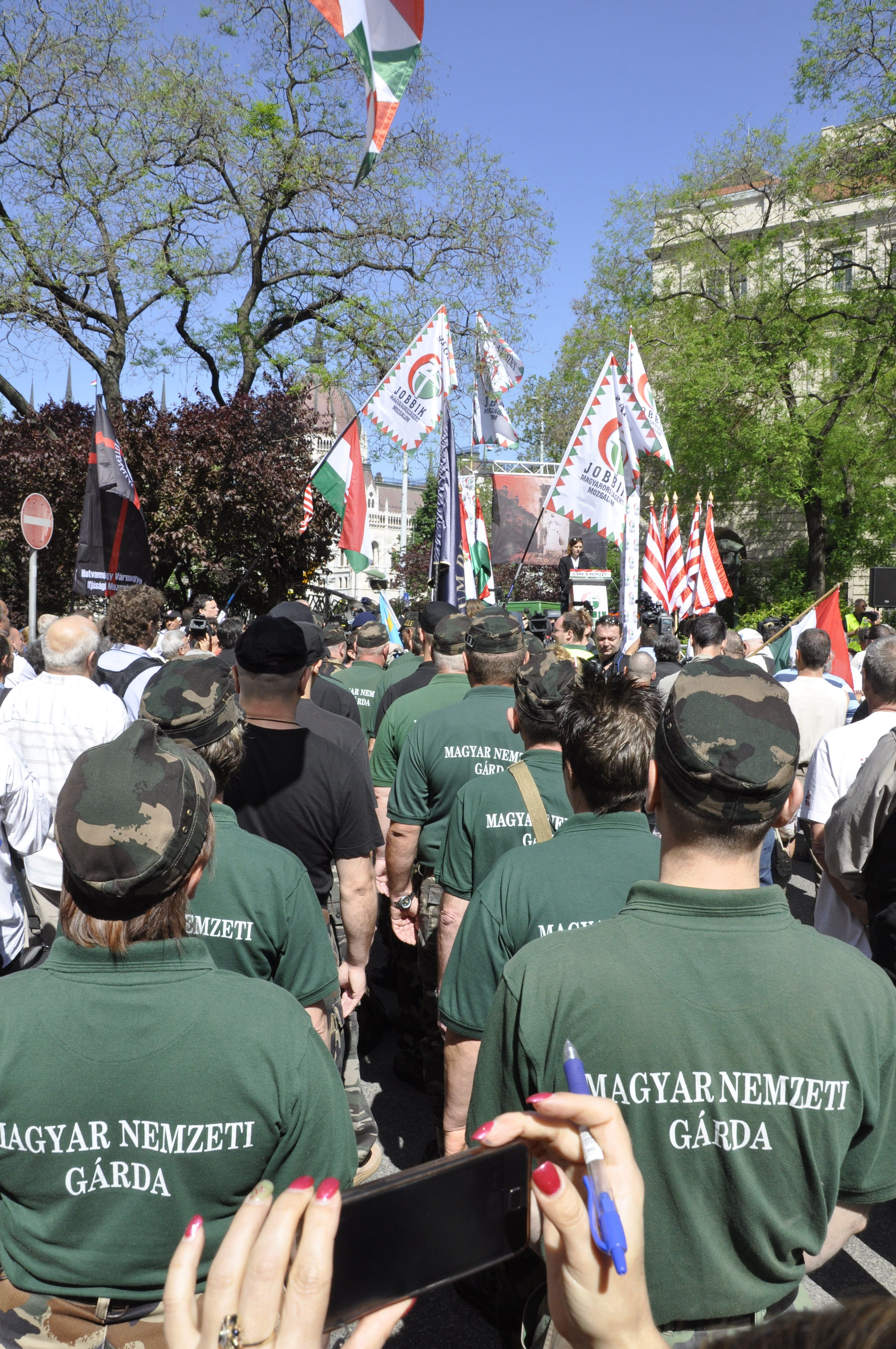
Members of the New Hungarian Guard at a Jobbik rally against a gathering of the World Jewish Congress in Budapest, 4 May 2013

On 10 March 2008 three leading figures of Jobbik (Dávid Kovács, the founding president of the party, Ervin Nagy, committee chairman, and Márton Fári, former chairman of the party's ethical committee) resigned from the party because of its relationship with the Magyar Gárda, and issued a statement that "Jobbik has been merged inseparably with the Guard, taking responsibility for something that it cannot really control in the long run".

After several schisms, the organization has largely ceased activity. On January 28, 2017, some radical members of Magyar Gárda held a demonstration against Gábor Vona outside Jobbik's year-opening event. Participants denounced the new politics of Jobbik as a betrayal of the right wing.

Gábor Vona, founder of the Magyar Gárda, used to be the head of Jobbik until his resignation in 2018.

== Dissolution ==
The Chief Prosecutor of Hungary sued the Gárda, alleging that its activity differs from its memorandum of association. The case was delayed several times. On the first day of litigation members of the Guard physically blocked journalists from entering the court, leading to a change in court rules.

On 16 December 2008, the Metropolitan Court of Budapest (Fővárosi Bíróság) as the court of first instance disbanded the "Magyar Gárda" because the court held that the activities of the organization were against the human rights of minorities as guaranteed by the Hungarian Constitution.

The "Magyar Gárda" appealed against the judgment, but the judgment of the first instance court was upheld by the Budapest Tribunal (Fővárosi Ítélőtábla) on 2 July 2009. Following the judgment, the Guard's representatives said they would apply for a review by the Supreme Court and ultimately challenge the judgment before the European Court of Human Rights at Strasbourg and claimed that the Hungarian courts were bowing to political pressure.

However, in 2013, the court upheld the ban on the Guard, ruling that while the ban was unprecedented, it was "the least violent manner" to deal with a group that posed a clear threat to minority groups.

== Reorganization ==
Since its dissolution ordered by the courts the Guard has attempted to reorganize itself as a civil service association, known as the Magyar Gárda Foundation, engaged in cultural and nation building activities rather than politics. It has held at least one "swearing in" ceremony and plans to expand its activities around the country.

Its renewed activities are opposed by the Hungarian authorities and prosecutors claim that the founding of the new organization is in contempt of previous court rulings. In February 2010 the Parliament passed a law which significantly raised the punishment for participating in a dissolved organization.

Despite the group being official outlawed members reorganised themselves under slightly different names like New Guard and National Guard (Magyar Nemzeti Gárda).

In 2019, László Toroczkai, the president of the Our Homeland Movement, who was expelled from Jobbik, founded a new organization (Nemzeti Légió) which is not the official successor of Magyar Gárda, but deemed to be its spiritual successor.

== See also ==
- Civil Guard Association for a Better Future, a similar organisation allegedly linked to the Magyar Nemzeti Gárda, a new group sharing the same ideology as the banned Magyar Gárda, according to the European Roma Rights Centre.
- Sebastian Gorka
