= Gábor Vona =

Hungarian politician (born 1978)

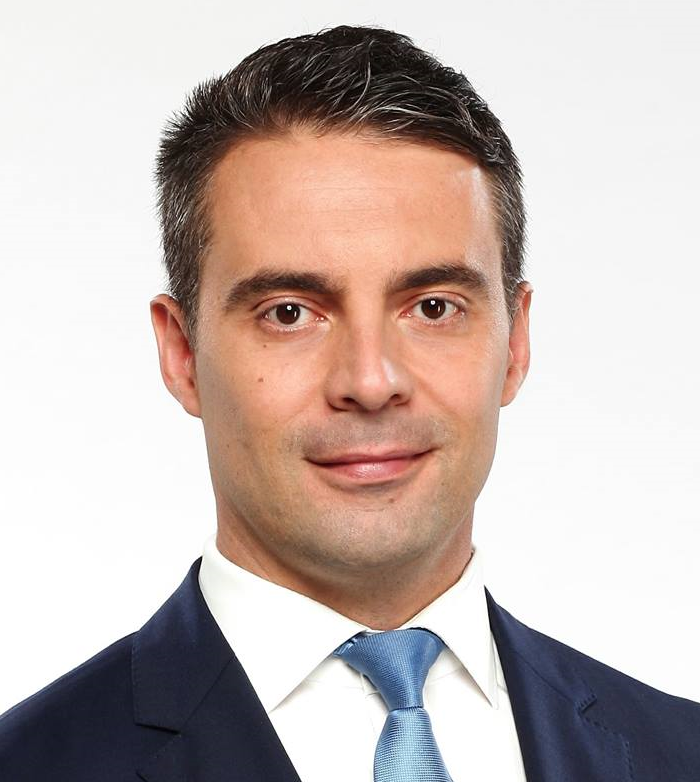
- Vona in 2017

President of Jobbik
- In office 25 November 2006 – 12 May 2018
- Preceded by: Dávid Kovács
- Succeeded by: Tamás Sneider

Member of the National Assembly
- In office 14 May 2010 – 7 May 2018

Personal details
- Born: Gábor Zázrivecz; 20 August 1978 (age 48) Gyöngyös, Hungary
- Party: Fidesz (2001–2003); Jobbik (2003–2019); Second Reform Era Party (2023–present)
- Spouse: Krisztina Vona-Szabó
- Children: 1
- Education: Eötvös Loránd University (BA)
- Occupation: Politician
- Profession: History teacher; psychologist

Gábor Vona (born Gábor Zázrivecz; 20 August 1978) is a Hungarian historian, teacher, and former nationalist politician who led the political party Jobbik from 2006 until 2018. He was the party's candidate for the position of prime minister in the 2010, 2014, and 2018 parliamentary elections. He served as a Member of Parliament (MP) from 2010 to 2018 and led the Jobbik parliamentary group until 2016.

Under his leadership, the Jobbik founded its controversial and short-lived paramilitary wing Magyar Gárda, while the then minor extra-parliamentary party gained great popularity among voters following the 2006 nationwide protests and gained representation in the National Assembly in the 2010 parliamentary election.

Vona attempted to redefine Jobbik from a nationalist radical movement to a conservative people's party after 2014 when the party became the largest opposition party to Viktor Orbán's Fidesz. Vona tendered his resignation after disappointing election results in the 2018 parliamentary election.

== Early life and family ==
Vona was born on 20 August 1978 in Gyöngyös. He studied secondary education focusing on history and psychology at the Eötvös Loránd University in Budapest.

According to Vona's biography, the family's name was originally Vona but Gábor's grandfather, also called Gábor, died in World War II in Transylvania during the Battle of Torda and his grandmother married a Zázrivecz who adopted Gábor's father. So he took back his original family name. The name change occurred when he was in college. According to Gábor Vona, the Vona surname came from his Italian paternal ancestors, while he also has Slovak maternal ancestors. He had worked as a history teacher for a short period of time, after which he had various jobs for a few years (educational organiser for a language school, and sales, first for a security company and then for an IT company). He lives in Óbuda with his wife and his first son Benedek. His parents are pensioners.

== Political career ==
=== Early career ===
During his university years Gábor Vona actively participated in the student organization of the Alliance of Christian Intellectuals and was a member of the students' council of his university. Besides founding JOBBIK (an acronym for Association of Right-Wing Youth; a youth movement that became the predecessor of the Jobbik party) he became a member of Fidesz and the civic circle of Viktor Orbán. With his expectations about Fidesz frustrated and supplanted by disappointment, in 2003 Gábor Vona re-established Jobbik as a political party and became its deputy chairman; he was then elected as party leader in 2006.

In 2007, Vona had founded the paramilitary group Hungarian Guard, which was outlawed in 2009.

In 2009 Vona repeatedly called for a change of government and for Hungary's ruling politicians to be "held to account", referring to among others, Ferenc Gyurcsány and Gordon Bajnai. He considers himself an "EU realist" arguing that the EU should take a new direction in which the role of the nations should have more weight. Vona argues that the national police should be greatly strengthened and supports introducing an American style "three strikes law".

In 2013 Vona travelled to Russia to meet with Aleksandr Dugin, with whom he discussed creating potential ties between Hungary and Russia based on a shared affinity for Traditionalism, additionally Vona had a traditionalist adviser by the name of Tibor Baranyi for a period of time.

He was the Jobbik's candidate for the position of Prime Minister of Hungary in the 2010 and 2014 Hungarian parliamentary elections. Jobbik won the seats for the first time in 2010, with Fidesz won the Supermajority.

After the elections, the party's congress elected him to be the leader of the Jobbik parliamentary group. Vona became a member of the parliamentarian Committee of Agriculture, and its sub-committees, the Sub-Committee of Viticulture and Winery, and the Sub-Committee of Renewal Resources.

=== People's party era ===
Before the 2014 parliamentary elections Vona proclaimed a new political trend, the so-called néppártosodás (English: moderation to a people's party) in Jobbik. Vona, as the president of the party, introduced a new style of communication while stating that Jobbik has grown out of its "adolescence" and reached its adulthood. Since then Vona has been defining his party as a national people's party that significantly changed its views on the European Union, while in the internal politics the party started to be more open for the different groups of the Hungarian society.

Vona states that his personal political views do not matter anymore. Jobbik should not focus on ideological issues. Instead, they should make efforts to eliminate the social tensions and controversies as well as to fight against corruption that can be found in public life and administration.

Vona withdrew from party politics after the failure in the 2018 parliamentary election. He became a YouTube vlogger and established a political think-tank, the Second Reform Era Foundation (Hungarian: Második Reformkor Alapítvány), dedicated to the preservation of Hungary's traditions. On 29 October 2019, Gábor Vona announced that he quit Jobbik.

=== Second Reform Era Party ===
On 9 September 2023, he founded his own political party, Second Reform Era Party.

During the 2026 Hungarian parliamentary election, he endorsed the Tisza Party.

Party political offices
Preceded by Dávid Kovács	President of Jobbik; 2006–2018	Succeeded by Tamás Sneider
National Assembly of Hungary
Preceded by First	Leader of the Jobbik parliamentary group 2010–2016	Succeeded by János Volner
