= Levente (organization) =

Paramilitary youth organisation in Hungary

Levente Associations
- Symbol of the Levente Associations
- Active: 31 December 1921 – 17 March 1945
- Disbanded: 17 March 1945
- Allegiance: Kingdom of Hungary
- Type: Paramilitary
- Size: 1,300,000 (in January 1944)
- Garrison/HQ: Budapest, Hungary
- March: Salus Hungaria
- Engagements: World War II

Commanders
- Notable commanders: Alajos Béldy

Pennant of the Levente Headquarters of Miklósvár District (Háromszék County, Kingdom of Hungary) from 1940 to 1944

Levente Associations (Hungarian: Leventeszervezetek) or simply levente were paramilitary youth organizations in Hungary during the interwar period and the Second World War. They were established in 1921 with the declared purpose of physical and health training. As of the mid-1930s, they became a de facto method of circumventing the ban on conscription imposed on Hungary by the Treaty of Trianon and over time, openly became a paramilitary organization under the leadership of military veterans. As of 1939, under the Act of Defense, all boys aged 12–21 were required to join the levente.

The levente are usually compared to the Hitler Youth of Nazi Germany and the Opera Nazionale Balilla of Italy, but while they also undertook military training, the levente were neither openly fascist nor particularly politicized, although they were not completely removed from the political influences of the time.

The levente had a smaller female branch, Leventelányok ("Levente Girls"), created as a voluntary organization in June 1942. Under the rule of Ferenc Szálasi, installed by the Nazis in Hungary in October 1944, mandatory levente duties were imposed on girls aged 12–19, despite strong opposition from the Catholic Church. However, the changes were never implemented because of the advance of the Red Army.

By the end of World War II, levente members were forced to serve in auxiliary military forces.

During the postwar Soviet occupation, many levente activists were tried by Soviet tribunals, convicted of "anti-Soviet activities" and deported to the USSR for penal labor.

== Gallery ==
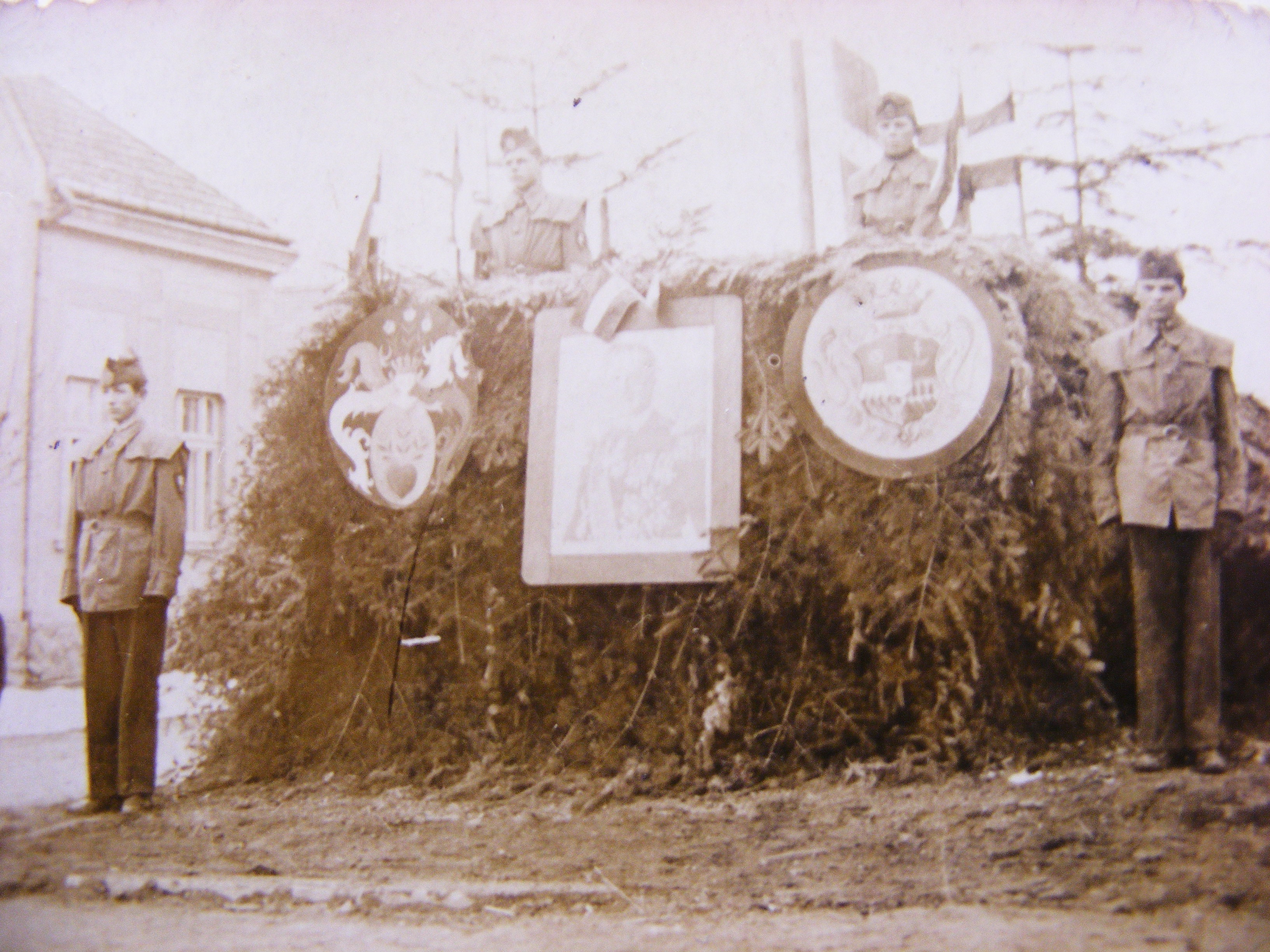
Levente members in Újtusnád, Northern Transylvania after the Second Vienna Award

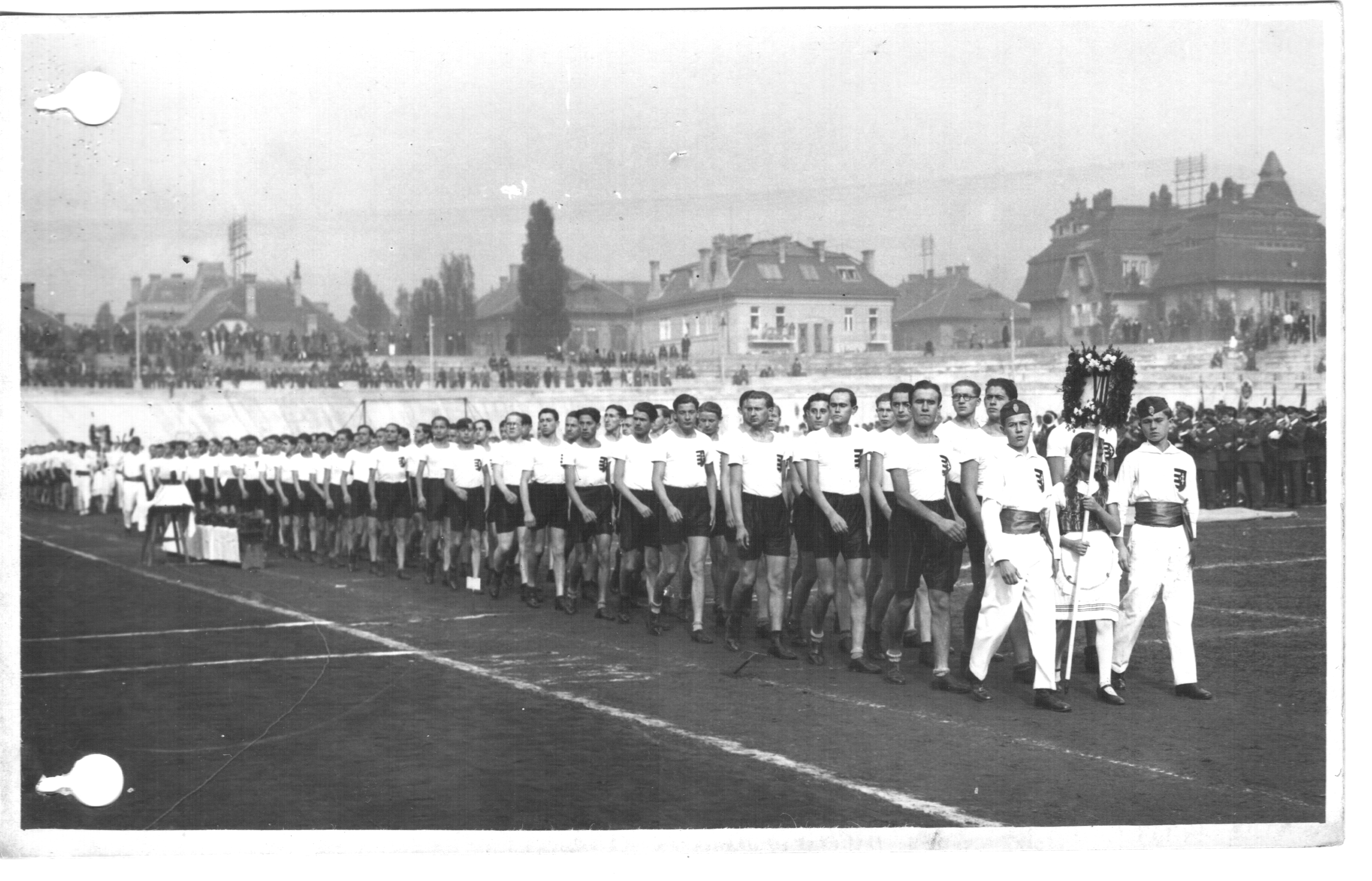
Levente members participating in the First National Levente Sports Festival

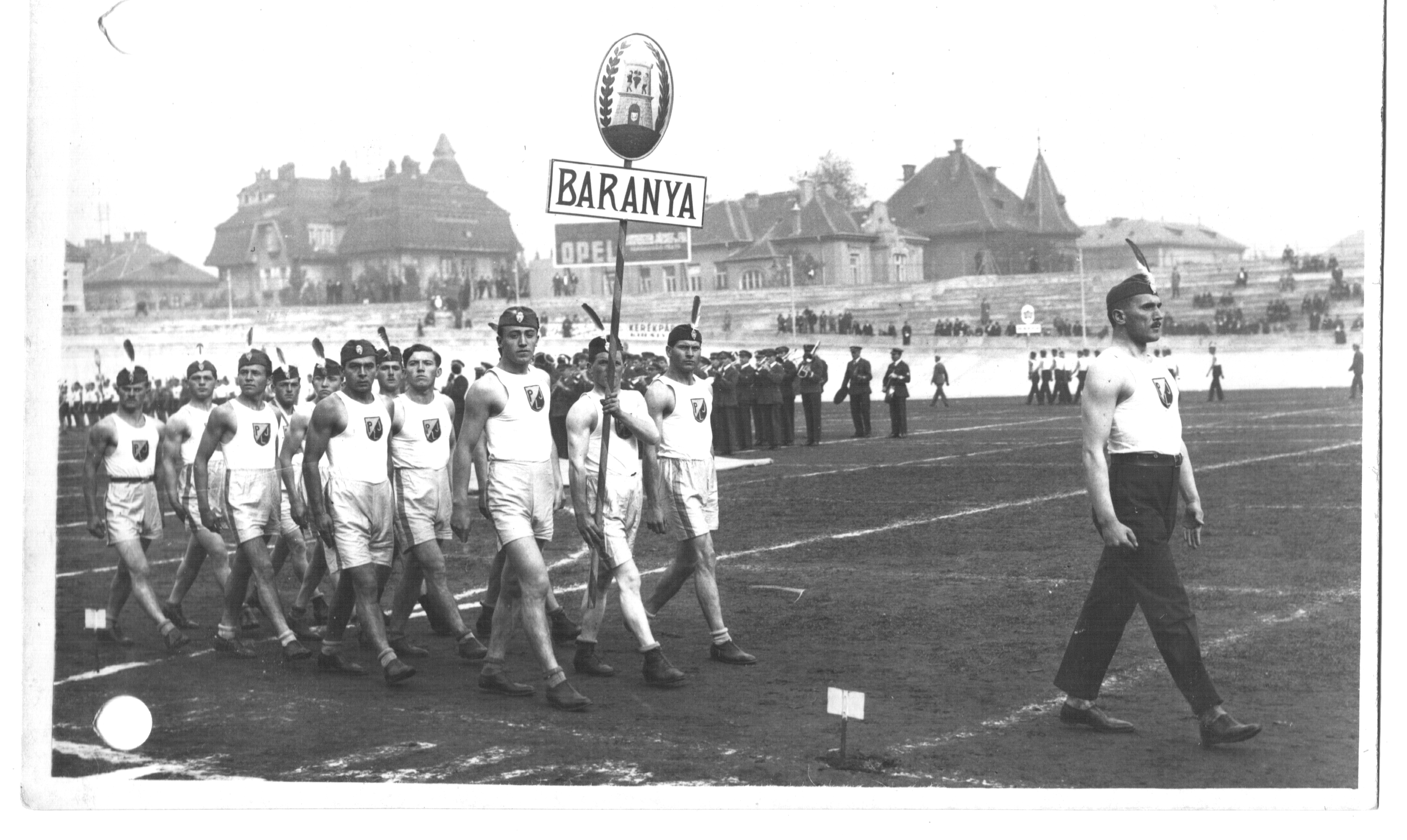
Levente members from Baranya County participating in the First National Levente Sports Festival

== See also ==
- Deutsche Jugend, a youth organization of ethnic Germans in Hungary
- Great Japan Youth Party
- Hitler Jugend
- Opera Nazionale Balilla
- Brannik
- National Youth Organisation
- Nationale Jeugdstorm (NJS), a Dutch far right youth group of World War II times
