= Hungarian Justice and Life Party =

Hungarian Justice and Life Party Magyar Igazság és Élet Pártja
- First leader: István Csurka
- Last leader: Tibor Nagy
- Founded: 15 July 1993
- Dissolved: 27 July 2021
- Split from: Hungarian Democratic Forum
- Merged into: Our Homeland Movement
- Headquarters: Hercegprímás utca 4, 1051 Budapest
- Newspaper: Magyar Fórum
- Youth wing: MIÉP Young Section
- Ideology: Hungarian nationalism National conservatism Social conservatism Hard Euroscepticism; Hungarian irredentism
- Political position: Far-right
- National affiliation: MIÉP–Jobbik Third Way Alliance of Parties (2005-2006)
- European affiliation: Euronat (formerly)
- Colours: Gold
- Most MPs (1998): 14 / 386

Party flag

Website
- www.miep.hu

The Hungarian Justice and Life Party (Hungarian: Magyar Igazság és Élet Pártja, pronounced [ˈmɒɟɒr ˈiɡɒʃːaːɡ ˈeːʃ ˈeːlɛt ˈpaːrcɒ], MIÉP) was a nationalist political party in Hungary that was founded by István Csurka in 1993.

== History ==
In the 1998 legislative elections, the party won 5.5% of the votes and gained parliamentary representation, with 14 seats.

In the 2002 elections, the party won 4.4% of the popular vote and no seats.

In 2005, MIÉP joined forces with a newer, radical Hungarian nationalist political party, Jobbik. The new political formation was registered under the name the MIÉP–Jobbik Third Way Alliance of Parties. It purported to speak for Christians whilst standing up for the rights of Hungarian minorities in the neighbouring countries. The programme was based on a "law and order" agenda, in order to crack down on crime. Following an acrimonious failure in the 2006 elections the alliance broke up. In the aftermath, MIÉP lost its leadership of the far-right forces in Hungary, with Jobbik going on to achieve success in the 2010 elections.

Csurka died on 4 February 2012, aged 77, after a long illness. He was replaced by former MP Zoltán Fenyvessy. In 2017, Zoltán Fenyvessy was replaced by Tibor Nagy.

In early 2019, Our Homeland Movement (Mi Hazánk Mozgalom) made an alliance with Hungarian Justice and Life Party and the agrarian Independent Smallholders, Agrarian Workers and Civic Party.

On 27 July 2021, the MIÉP was dissolved, and merged into the Our Homeland Movement.

== Party leaders ==
	Image	Name	Entered office	Left office	Length of Leadership
1		István Csurka	15 July 1993	4 February 2012 †	18 years, 6 months and 20 days
2		Fenyvessy Zoltán	28 October 2012	6 March 2017	4 years, 4 months and 6 days
3		Tibor Nagy	6 March 2017	27 July 2021	4 years, 4 months and 21 days

== Parliamentary representation ==
=== National Assembly ===
Election	Votes			Seats		Rank	Government	Prime Minister candidate
Election	#	%	±pp	#	+/−	Rank	Government	Prime Minister candidate
1994	85,431	1.58%	–	0 / 386	▼12	10th	extra-parliamentary	István Csurka
1998	248,901	5.47%	▲3.89	14 / 386	▲14	5th	in opposition	István Csurka
2002	245,326	4.37%	▼1.1	0 / 386	▼14	4th	extra-parliamentary	István Csurka
2006^{1}	119,007	2.2%	▼2.17	0 / 386	0	5th	extra-parliamentary	István Csurka
2010	1,286	0.03%	▼2.17	0 / 386	0	10th	extra-parliamentary	István Csurka
2014^{2}	2,054	0.04%	▲0.01	0 / 199	0	33rd	extra-parliamentary	Zoltán Fenyvessy
2018	8,713	0.15%	▲0.11	0 / 199	0	10th	extra-parliamentary	Tibor Nagy

^{1}In an electoral alliance with Jobbik, under the name of the "MIÉP–Jobbik Third Way Alliance of Parties", joined by Independent Smallholders’ Party (FKgP) organisations from 15 counties.

^{2}In an electoral alliance with Smallholders' Party.

=== European Parliament ===
Election year	# of overall votes	% of overall vote	# of overall seats won	+/-	Notes
2004	72,203	2.35% (5th)	0 / 24		
