= List of newspapers in Hungary =

The number of national daily newspapers in Hungary was 21 in 1950 and it increased to 40 in 1965. In 1986 the Press Act became effective, regulating the newspaper market in the country. Following the collapse of the communist regime the act was revised in January 1990.

This is a list of Hungarian newspapers and other papers, online newspapers and portals as well.

== National ==
=== Daily ===
| Title | Language | Print / Online | Est. | Owner | Orientation | Link |
|---|---|---|---|---|---|---|
| 24.hu | Hungarian | Online | 1996 | Central Media Group | Left, liberal | 24.hu |
| 168 | Hungarian | Online | 1989 | Brit Media Group | Left, liberal | 168.hu |
| 444 | Hungarian | Online | 2013 | Magyar Jeti Zrt. | Left, liberal | 444.hu |
| About Hungary | English; German | Online | 2013 | International Communications Office; Cabinet Office of the Prime Minister | Official blog of the former Prime Minister | abouthungary.hu |
| Alfahír | Hungarian | Online | 2009 | Kiegyensúlyozott Médiáért Alapítvány | Left, liberal | alfahir.hu |
| Átlátszó.hu | Hungarian | Online | 2011 | atlatszo.hu Közhasznú Nonprofit Kft. | Left, liberal, investigative journalism | atlatszo.hu |
| Blikk | Hungarian | Both | 1994 | Indamédia | Sensationalism, tabloid | www.blikk.hu |
| Bors | Hungarian | Both | 2001 | KESMA | Right, sensationalism, tabloid | www.borsonline.hu |
| Budapester Zeitung | German | Online | 1999 | ? | Left, liberal | www.budapester.hu |
| Daily News Hungary | English | Online | 2013 | DNH Media Group Kft. | Cultural | dailynewshungary.com |
| Economx | Hungarian | Online | 1999 | Indamedia Network Zrt. | Left, liberal, business and finance | economx.hu |
| Helló Magyar | Hungarian | Online | 2021 | DNH Media Group Kft. | Cultural | hellomagyar.hu |
| Híradó | Hungarian | Online | ? | Duna Médiaszolgáltató Nonprofit Zrt. | Pro-Orbán-government | hirado.hu |
| Hungary Today | English | Online | ? | Friends of Hungary Foundation | Pro-Orbán-government | hungarytoday.hu |
| Heti Világgazdaság | Hungarian | Online | 1979 | HVG Kiadó Zrt. | Left, liberal | hvg.hu |
| Index | Hungarian | Online | 1995 | Indamedia Network Zrt. | Right, conservatism | index.hu |
| Kitekintő | Hungarian | Online | 2007 | Flux Communications | Foreign policy | kitekinto.hu |
| Kuruc.info | Hungarian | Online | 2006 | WBY Ltd. | Right, far-right | kuruc.info |
| Le Journal Francophone de Budapest | French | Online | ? | ? | Cultural | www.jfb.hu |
| Magyar Hírlap | Hungarian | Online | 1968 | Gábor Széles | Right, conservative | magyarhirlap.hu |
| Magyar Jelen | Hungarian | Online | ? | Innovatív Kommunikáció Alapítvány | Right, far-right, conservative | magyarjelen.hu |
| Magyar Kurír | Hungarian | Online | 1911 | Catholic Bishops' Conference of Hungary | Catholic journalism | www.magyarkurir.hu |
| Magyar Nemzet | Hungarian | Both | 1938 | KESMA | Right, conservative | magyarnemzet.hu |
| Media1 | Hungarian | Online | 2019 | Media1 Digitális Média Kft. | Media news | media1.hu |
| Mérce | Hungarian | Online | 2008 | Kettős Mérce Blog Egyesület | Left, liberal | merce.hu |
| Metropol | Hungarian | Both | 2020 | KESMA | Right, conservative | metropol.hu |
| Nemzeti Sport | Hungarian | Both | 1903 | KESMA | Sports | www.nemzetisport.hu |
| Neokohn | Hungarian; English | Online | 2019 | Brit Media Group | Centre, Jewish journalism | neokohn.hu |
| Népszava | Hungarian | Both | 1877 | Tamás Leisztinger | Left, liberal | nepszava.hu |
| Nyugati Fény | Hungarian | Online | 2012 | ? | Left, liberal | nyugatifeny.hu |
| Origo | Hungarian | Online | 1998 | KESMA | Right, conservative | www.origo.hu/index.html |
| Pesti Bulvár | Hungarian | Online | ? | Médiacom | Left, liberal | pestibulvar.hu |
| PestiSrácok.hu | Hungarian | Online | 2012 | Gerilla Press Kft. | Right, conservative, investigative journalism | www.pestisracok.hu |
| Portfolio.hu | Hungarian; English | Online | 1999 | NET Média | Left, liberal, business and economics | www.portfolio.hu |
| Színes Ász | Hungarian | Print | 2004 | Színesászmédia Kft. | Tabloid | - |
| Szeretlek Magyarország | Hungarian | Online | ? | Szeretlek Magyarország Médiacsoport | Cultural | www.szeretlekmagyarorszag.hu |
| Telex | Hungarian; English | Online | 2020 | Van Másik Kft. | Left, liberal | telex.hu |
| Ungarn Heute | German | Online | ? | Friends of Hungary Foundation | Cultural | ungarnheute.hu |
| Válasz Online | Hungarian | Online | 2018 | Válasz Online Kiadó Kft. | Centre, investigative journalism | valaszonline.hu |
| Vasárnap | Hungarian | Online | ? | Kovács K. Zoltán Alapítvány | Right, conservative, Catholic journalism | vasarnap.hu |
| Vadhajtások | Hungarian | Online | ? | magyar hazafiak | Right, far-right | vadhajtasok.hu |
| Velvet | Hungarian | Online | 2002 | Indamedia Network Zrt. | Tabloid | velvet.hu |
| Világgazdaság | Hungarian | Online | 1969 | KESMA | Right, business and finance | www.vg.hu |
| Zsúrpubi | Hungarian | Online | ? | HUNGÁRIA MÉDIA | Right, national radicalism | zsurpubi.hu |

=== Weekly ===
| Title | Language | Print / Online | Est. | Owner | Orientation | Link |
|---|---|---|---|---|---|---|
| Csók és Könny | Hungarian | Print | 1992 | Ringier-Axel Springer | Love stories, mysteries of mind and body | - |
| Evangélikus Élet | Hungarian | Both | 1933 | Evangelical-Lutheran Church in Hungary | Lutheran journalism | www.evelet.hu |
| Élet és Irodalom | Hungarian | Both | 1923 | Élet és Irodalom Baráti Társaság; Élet és Irodalom Alapítvány | Left, liberal, literary and political life | www.es.hu |
| Élet és Tudomány | Hungarian | Both | 1946 | Society for Dissemination of Scientific Knowledge (Tudományos Ismeretterjesztő Társulat, TIT) | Scientific, educational | www.eletestudomany.hu |
| Fanny | Hungarian | Print | ? | ? | Women's magazine | - |
| Foaia Românească | Romanian | Both | ? | ? | Cultural journalism of minorities | foaia.hu |
| Füles | Hungarian | Print | 1957 | Central Media Group | Puzzle magazine | - |
| Hetek | Hungarian | Both | 1997 | Faith Church, Hungary | Pentecostal journalism, yellow journalism | www.hetek.hu |
| HOT! | Hungarian | Print | 2006 | Mediaworks | Tabloid | - |
| Hrvatski glasnik | Croatian language | Both | 1991 | Croatica | Cultural journalism of minorities | www.glasnik.hu |
| Jelen | Hungarian | Both | 2020 | Liberty Press Bt. | Left, liberal | jelen.media |
| Kiskegyed | Hungarian | Both | 2000 | Ringier-Axel Springer | Tabloid, women's magazine | kiskegyed.blikk.hu |
| Ľudové noviny | Slovak language | Both | 1957 | SlovakUm | Cultural journalism of minorities | www.luno.hu |
| Mandiner | Hungarian | Both | 1999 | KESMA | Right, conservative | mandiner.hu |
| Magyar Demokrata | Hungarian | Both | 1989 | Artamondo Kft. | Right, conservative | www.demokrata.hu |
| Magyar Hang | Hungarian | Both | 2018 | Alhambra Press Bt. | Left, liberal | hang.hu |
| Magyar Narancs | Hungarian | Both | 1989 | Magyarnarancs.hu | Left, liberal | magyarnarancs.hu |
| Munkások Újsága | Hungarian | Both | 2011 | Yes Solidarity for Hungary Movement | Left, liberal | muon.hu |
| Neue Zeitung | German language | Both | 1957 | Neue Zeitung Stiftung | Cultural journalism of minorities | neue-zeitung.hu |
| Nők Lapja | Hungarian | Both | 1949 | Central Media Group | Women's magazine | noklapja.nlcafe.hu |
| Országút | Hungarian | Both | 2020 | Magyar Szemle Alapítvány | Right, conservative, literary and political life | orszagut.com |
| Orvosi Hetilap | Hungarian | Print | 1857 | Hungarian Academy of Sciences | Medical journalism | - |
| Pester Lloyd | German | Online | 1853 | Pester Lloyd | Left, liberal | www.pesterlloyd.net |
| Pesti Hírlap | Hungarian | Both | 2020 | Brit Media Grouo | Centre, liberal | pestihirlap.hu |
| Reformátusok Lapja | Hungarian | Both | 1957 | Reformed Church in Hungary | Calvinist journalism | reformatus.hu |
| Ripost7 | Hungarian | Both | 2015 | KESMA | Right, sensationalism, tabloid | ripost.hu |
| Sport plusz | Hungarian | Print | ? | ? | Sports | www.sportplusz.hu |
| Srpske narodne novine | Serbian language | Print | ? | ? | Cultural journalism of minorities | ? |
| Story | Hungarian | Both | ? | ? | Tabloid | www.storyonline.hu |
| Szabad Föld | Hungarian | Both | 1944 | KESMA | Right, rural magazine | www.szabadfold.hu |
| Tvr-hét | Hungarian | Both | ? | Ringier-Axel Springer | TV Guide | tvrhet.blikk.hu |
| Új Ember | Hungarian | Both | 1945 | Catholic Church in Hungary | Catholic journalism | ujember.hu |
| Új Egyenlőség | Hungarian | Online | 2016 | Új Egyenlőség Alapítvány | Left, liberal | ujegyenloseg.hu |
| Vasárnap Reggel | Hungarian | Print | ? | KESMA | Tabloid | - |

=== Biweekly ===
- Autó-Motor (classic, car magazine)
- Hócipő (satirical political magazine)

=== Monthly ===
- 4x4 (automobile magazine)
- A Mi Otthonunk (interior design magazine)
- A Szív (spiritual, cultural and self-awareness magazine)
- Alfissimo! (Italian sport automobile magazine)
- AMS (automobile magazine)
- Auto Bild (automobile magazine)
- Bravo (teen magazine)
- Budapest (cultural life, buildings, history)
- The Budapest Times (English, est. 1999, owned by BZT Media, right, conservatism - www.budapesttimes.hu)
- Cosmopolitan (women's magazine)
- Elle (fashion magazine)
- EuroXtrade (engineering and technology magazine)
- Ezermester (general technology magazine)
- Filmvilág (art magazine)
- FourFourTwo (football magazine)
- GEO (geography, science, history, nature)
- Glamour (women's magazine)
- InStyle (women’s fashion magazine)
- Joy (women's magazine)
- Kaliber (magazine for guns)
- Kockás (comics magazine)
- Lakáskultúra (premium home furnishings and lifestyle magazine)
- Magyar Építéstechnika (magazine of ÉVOSZ)
- Magyar Sakkvilág (chess magazine)
- Marie Claire (women's magazine)
- Men's Health (men's magazine)
- National Geographic (scientific journal)
- PC Guru (computer games)
- PC World (computer magazine)
- Playboy (men's magazine)
- Rádiótechnika (radio-electronic journal)
- Zsaru (criminal magazine)

=== Bimonthly ===
- Indóház (rail magazine, rail systems)
- TermészetBÚVÁR (scientific journal, especially geographical and biological topics)

== Regional ==
by County

- 24 Óra; KESMA - Komárom-Esztergom County (daily)
- Békés Megyei Hírlap; KESMA - Békés County (daily)
- Délmagyarország; KESMA - Csongrád-Csanád County (daily)
- Dunaújvárosi Hírlap; KESMA - Dunaújváros (daily)
- Új Dunántúli Napló; KESMA - Baranya County (daily)
- Észak-Magyarország; KESMA - Borsod-Abaúj-Zemplén County (daily)
- Fejér Megyei Hírlap; KESMA - Fejér County (daily)
- Hajdú-Bihari Napló; KESMA - Hajdú-Bihar County (daily)
- Heves Megyei Hírlap; KESMA - Heves County (daily)
- Kelet-Magyarország; KESMA - Szabolcs-Szatmár-Bereg County (daily)
- Kisalföld; KESMA - Győr-Moson-Sopron County (daily)
- Napló; KESMA - Veszprém County (daily)
- Nógrád Megyei Hírlap; KESMA - Nógrád County (daily)
  - Palócföld (biweekly, literary, artistic, public journal)
- Petőfi Népe; KESMA - Bács-Kiskun County (daily)
- Somogyi Hírlap; KESMA - Somogy County (daily)
- Tolnai Népújság; KESMA - Tolna County (daily)
- Új Néplap; KESMA - Jász-Nagykun-Szolnok County (daily)
- Vas Népe; KESMA - Vas County (daily)
- Zalai Hírlap; KESMA - Zala County (daily)

by Municipality

- Budai Polgár - Budapest, II. (biweekly)
- Debreceni Főnix - Debrecen (monthly, Reformed youth culture newspaper)
- Pándi Tükör - Pánd (quarterly, public and culture life)

== Monthly newspapers ==
Tabloid

- Best

Teenager

- POPCORN (music)
- DUE Tallózó

== Other papers ==
=== Science ===
- 3.évezred

=== Entertainment ===
- Exit
- IgenHír
- Pesti Est
- Pesti Műsor

== See also ==
- List of magazines in Hungary
- Media in Hungary
- Telecommunications in Hungary

== Media monitoring ==
- IMEDIA, Media monitoring
- Gy&K PR, Media monitoring and Marketing Ltd
