= András Gerevich =

Hungarian poet, screenwriter (born 1976)

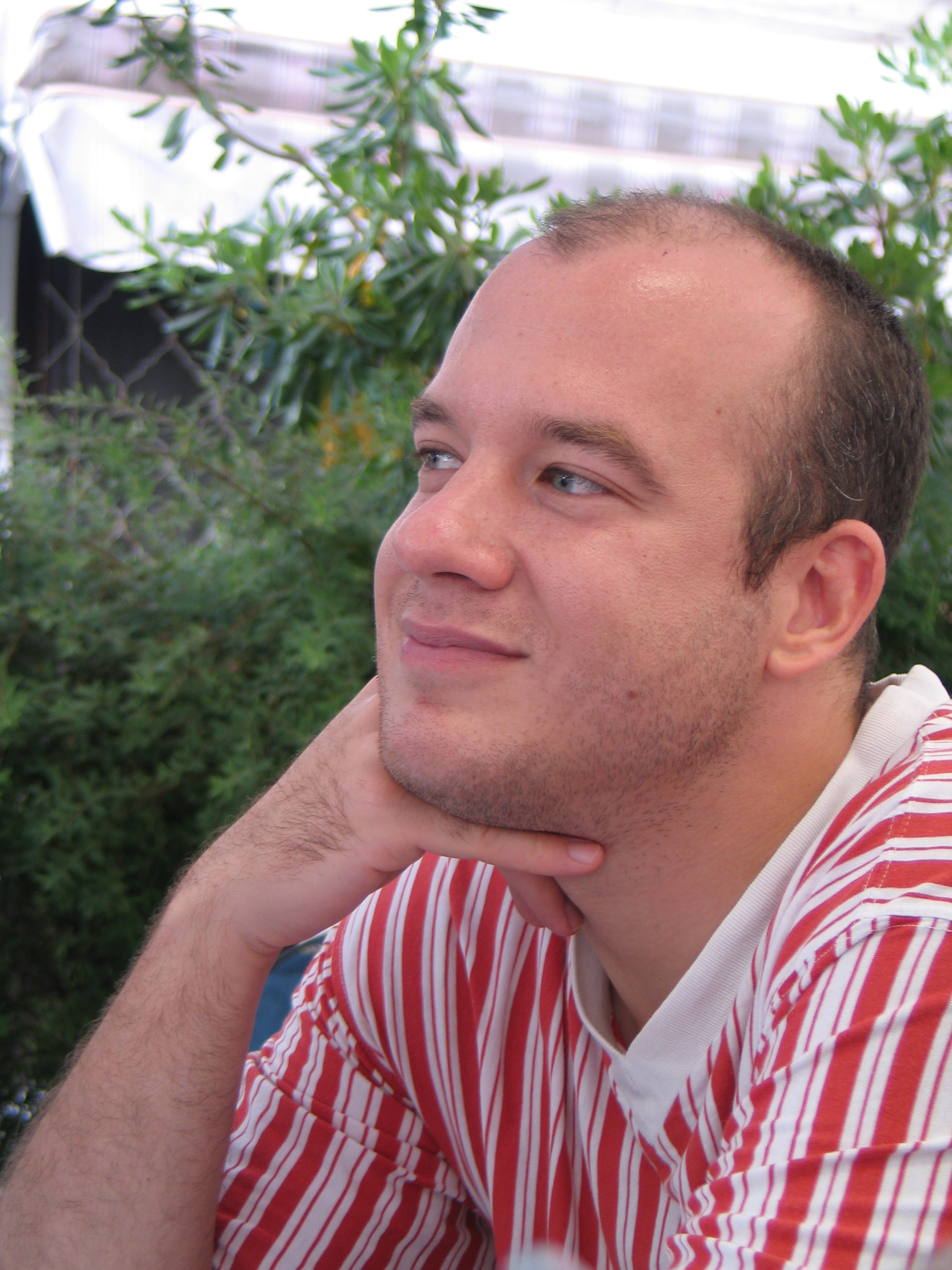
- Gerevich in 2008
- Born: András Tibor Gerevich; 4 December 1976 (age 49); Budapest, Hungary
- Education: Eötvös Loránd University (M.A.); Dartmouth College (M.A.L.S.); National Film and Television School (M.F.A.)
- Occupations: Poet; professor; translator; screenwriter
- Writing career
- Language: English; Hungarian
- Years active: 1997–present
- Genres: Ecopoetry, Homoerotic poetry
- Notable work: Friends (2009)
- Website: andrasgerevich.com/english

András Tibor Gerevich (Hungarian pronunciation: [ˈɒndraːʃ ˈɡɛrɛvit͡ʃ]; born 4 December 1976) is a Hungarian poet, screenwriter, literary translator and professor of creative writing, poetry, and screenwriting.

His first book of Poetry Átadom a pórázt (Handing Over the Leash) was released in 1997. His third collection of poems, Friends (Barátok) (Note: The term 'barátok' in Hungarian is used for both “Friends” and “Boyfriends”, the title implies both.) (2009), garnered critical acclaim. PRAE magazine described it as “one of the most important Hungarian books of poetry in the year 2009.“ His first book of translation Különös gyümölcs (Strange Fruit), an anthology of translation of Seamus Heaney's poems was published in 1997. He has also translated work of poets like Frank O'Hara, Charles Bernstein, and Jericho Brown into Hungarian. He is openly gay and is often described as the “first openly gay poet in Hungary”. (Note: Attributed to multiple references:)

== Life and career ==
Gerevich was born in Budapest, Hungary on 4 December 1976. He grew up in Budapest, Dublin and Vienna. He graduated with a major in English Language and Literature and a minor in Aesthetics from ELTE School of English and American Studies. Later he studied Creative Writing at Dartmouth College, in the a United States, on a Fulbright Scholarship. He received his third degree in screenwriting from the National Film and Television School (NFTS) in the UK. He is openly gay.

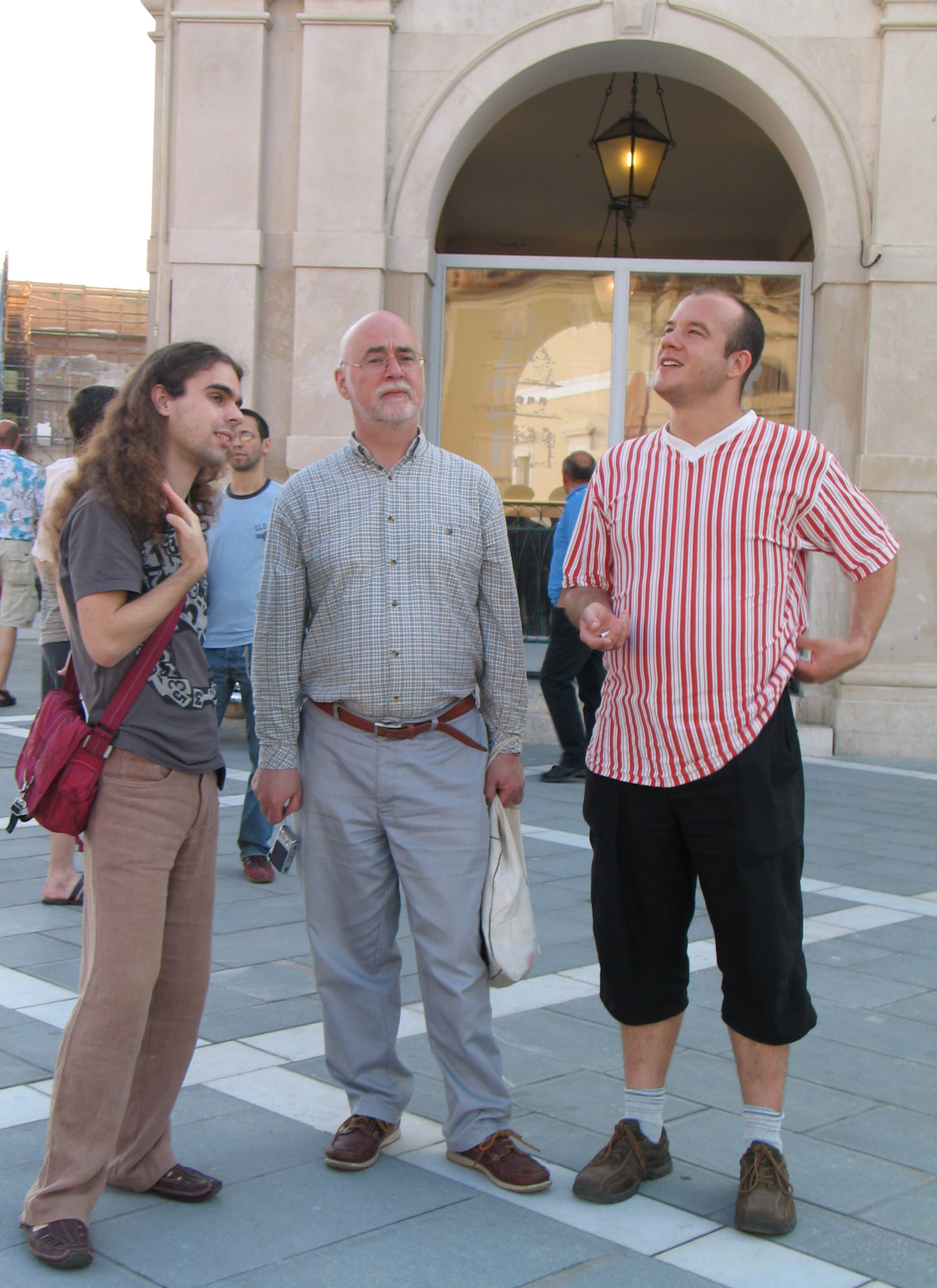
Valery Ledenev, Christopher Whyte, Andras Gerevich at the seminar of gay poets in Piran in 2008

In 2004, he was an assistant producer for the radio program Poetry by Post for the BBC World Service in London. He was the president of József Attila Kör (Attila József Circle), an association for young Hungarian writers from 2006 to 2009. He edited the literary journals Kalligram, Chroma and contributed to Clamantis: The MALS Journal. He has also written articles for magazines like Magyar Narancs, Élet és Irodalom, and PRAE.

Gerevich was adjunct professor of Screenwriting and Creative Writing at ELTE School of English and American Studies from 2011 to 2014. He is an associate professor of Screenwriting at Budapest Metropolitan University and adjunct professor of Screenwriting and New Media Writing at McDaniel College Budapest. He was a visiting professor of Creative Writing at Vassar College in fall 2016. In 2026, during the spring semester, Gerevich served as a Fulbright visiting professor of poetry at the Guarini School of Graduate and Advanced Studies, Dartmouth College.

Gerevich's first book of Poetry Átadom a pórázt (Handing Over the Leash) was first Published in 1997. Since then four more volumes of his poetry has been published. In 2008, his poems were translated into English under the title ″Tiresias's Confession″. In 2010, his poems were part of Arc Publications' English-Hungarian bilingual anthology ″New Order: Hungarian Poets of the Post 1989 Generation″, which was edited by George Szirtes. In 2017, Andrew Fentham received the Stephen Spender Prize for the translation of his poem "Balatoni Baleset (Balaton Accident)" into English. Gerevich himself has translated many English poems and books into Hungarian. His first book of translation Különös gyümölcs (Strange Fruit), an anthology of translation of Seamus Heaney's poems was published in 1997. His other translations include, The Man in the High Castle by Philip K. Dick and Catching the Big Fish by David Lynch.

== Literary style and themes ==
George Szirtes who translated many of Gerevich's poems into English, called his poems "so clear, so pellucid, so free of metaphor and simile as to be almost pure speech." He further wrote that "they are mostly about love, desire, and passion; a little like a diary, a little like a letter, a little like a confessional, the first person singular being at the centre of each. But there is nothing self-indulgent about them." Imre Payer of PRAE, praised "intentional free verse form" and "metaphor-less verse speech" in his poetry. He further wrote, "The emphasis on visuality and new sensibility is also proven by the fact that András Gerevich is especially good at composition. He knows and has mastered classical topical and acoustic tech very well."

His poetry features homoerotic themes. He also wrote homoerotic poetry under several pseudonyms for magazines like Mások. Norman Jope of Tears in the Fence, wrote, "Gerevich, who apparently divides his time between Budapest and the English-speaking world, is much more than a poet of political protest alone - his work, on the whole, is characterized by a direct sensuality that you don't have to be gay to enjoy This defiant celebration of gayness is a perfect riposte to the family fascists, as in 'Marmaris.' On the other hand, writing about family matters doesn't necessarily make one a purveyor of so-called 'family values'." Gerevich in an interview, said, “All my love poems have been written to men. Only in Hungarian, the pronouns do not have genders like in most languages. The third person singular is neutral; there is no difference between he and she. (Note: Ő is used for third-person singular (nominative form) in Hungarian)“ In another interview he said that he does not reject the title of "gay poet", but he considers it "flat and one-dimensional." He further said, "The situation is fundamentally contradictory, since if a gay poet writes intimate, confessional poems, the question inevitably arises as to whether he assumes the social responsibility by which he becomes a kind of representative of the gay community. After all, creation is simple self-reflection, so yes, it is a situation that you have to learn to handle, you have to get used to."

Szilárd Borbély in his review of Gerevich's second book Férfiak (Men, 2005) for Élet és Irodalom, wrote, "András Gerevich's second volume is about love between men in such a way that it also hides the code of autobiographical speech in the pieces of the volume. He also strongly stylizes, that is, he searches for a literary form, writes poems, but in a way that moves on the border of personal and allegorical translatability. In his stylized poetic language, which moves on the border between prose and lyric, the speaking minds speak in a language of omissions broken into stanzas. It becomes a true lyric by unraveling deep trauma through a system of symbols."

His 2009 collection of poems, Friends (Barátok), garnered critical acclaim. Viktória Radics in her review of Barátok, wrote, “András Gerevich, who until now attracted attention with his openness about sex between men in poetry, has now crossed the line of breaking the taboo. These current poems are shockingly good not because they write about the strange erotic-sexual experiences and bizarreness of gay relationships, but because they touch on the height and depth of love, sometimes even capture it.“ Könyves Magazine wrote, “Barátok goes beyond the poetics of chest hair (Note: referring Gerevich's poem "Marmaris") in the poems the homosexual theme is objectified in such a way that the experience material of the lyrical self holds exciting possibilities even for the reader who is not familiar with the homosexual experience.“

His 2022 poetry collection Légzésgyakorlatok (Breathing Exercises) was described as a “shift from the theme of sex and physicality to ecopoetry and biopoetics.“ However, László Bedecs in his review in Jelenkor, wrote that "the title (and the titular poem) is still a cry" and "the intimate sphere just mentioned becomes more and more narrow due to external pressure". He further wrote that "if Gerevich's feelings are branded as something from which the children must be protected, (Note: Act LXXIX of 2021, often mentioned in English-language media as Hungary's anti-LGBT law, banned sharing information with minors that are considered to be promoting homosexuality or gender reassignment) i.e. as something bad, threatening, then it is no wonder that in the poem also cries out for space and air. Or you do breathing exercises to help you calm down. This, too, makes this volume a part of today's political discourse."

== Works ==
=== Bibliography ===
==== Articles ====
- Gerevich, Andras; Vikár, György (1 January 1997). "Jewish Fate(S) in the Mirror of Psychoanalysis". Renewal of the Psychoanalitic Tradition in East Central Europe. 24–25 (1): 171–179. doi:10.1163/187633097X00150.
- Gerevich, Andras; Bakó, Tihamér; Révai, Katalin (1 January 1997). "In a Glass Darkly". Renewal of the Psychoanalitic Tradition in East Central Europe. 24–25 (1): 219–231. doi:10.1163/187633097X00187.
- Szirtes, George (14 September 2001). "Magyar gyökerek, angol hagyományok" [Hungarian Roots, English Traditions] (Interview) (in Hungarian). Interviewed by András Gerevich. Budapest: Élet és Irodalom.
- Gerevich, Andras; Hastie, Nicki; Beckett, Chris; Maitreyabandhu, Maitreyabandhu (2008). "Poems". Soundings. 2008 (39). ISSN 1362-6620.
- "20 + 20 éves a József Attila Kör" [The József Attila Circle is 20 + 20 years old]. Élet és Irodalom (in Hungarian). Vol. 53, no. 17. Budapest: Élet és Irodalom. 24 April 2009. Archived from the original on 1 September 2019.
- "Géher István (1940–2012)" [István Géher (1940–2012)]. Élet és Irodalom (in Hungarian). Vol. 56, no. 24. Budapest: Élet és Irodalom. 15 June 2012. Archived from the original on 1 September 2019.
- "Szivárvány családok – melegparádé Bécsben" [Rainbow families - gay parade in Vienna] (in Hungarian). Budapest: Magyar Narancs. 21 June 2012. Archived from the original on 27 August 2015.
- "Még egyszer Kölcseyről" [One more time about Kölcsey]. Heti Világgazdaság (in Hungarian). Budapest: HVG Kiadó Zrt. 19 November 2013. Archived from the original on 9 February 2017.
- "Kimért, kemény szenvedély" [A measured, hard passion]. Élet és Irodalom (in Hungarian). Vol. 64, no. 42. Budapest: Élet és Irodalom. 16 October 2020. Archived from the original on 16 September 2021.
- "Jericho Brown Verseihez" [For Poems by Jericho Brown]. 1749.hu (in Hungarian). Budapest. 5 November 2020. Archived from the original on 31 July 2021.
- "Gyerekkor mesék nélkül" [Childhood without fairy tales]. Magyar Narancs (in Hungarian). Vol. 32, no. 42. Budapest: Magyarnarancs.hu Lapkiadó Kft. 15 November 2020. Archived from the original on 16 March 2022.
- "Melegnek lenni, szülőnek lenni" [Being gay, being a parent]. Magyar Narancs (in Hungarian). Vol. 32, no. 48. Budapest: Magyarnarancs.hu. 26 November 2020.
- "A legnehezebb kamasznak lenni" [Being a teenager is the hardest]. Magyar Narancs (in Hungarian). Vol. 33, no. 25. Budapest: Magyarnarancs.hu Lapkiadó Kft. 23 June 2021.
- "UTÓSZÓ EGY ÚJ AMERIKAI KÖLTÉSZETI ANTOLÓGIÁHOZ" [Afterword to a New Anthology of American Poetry]. 1749.hu (in Hungarian). Budapest. 18 July 2022. Archived from the original on 4 January 2023.
- "Magyar queer álmok" [Hungarian Queer Dreams]. FilmVilág (in Hungarian). Budapest: Filmvilág Alapítványt. September 2022. Archived from the original on 4 January 2023.
- "Queer Erasure". Magyar Narancs (in Hungarian). Vol. 35, no. 26. Budapest: Magyarnarancs.hu Lapkiadó Kft. 28 June 2023.
- "Osztálytársak" [Classmates]. Élet és Irodalom (in Hungarian). Vol. 67, no. 50. Budapest. 15 December 2023.

==== Poetry collections ====
- Átadom a pórázt [Handing Over the Leash] (in Hungarian). József Attila Kör/Balassi Kiadó. 1997. ISBN 9635061358.
- Férfiak [Men] (in Hungarian). Kalligram Könyvkiadó. 2005. ISBN 8071497487.
- Barátok [Friends] (in Hungarian). Kalligram Könyvkiadó. 2009. ISBN 9788081011702.
- Tizenhat naplemente [Sixteen Sunsets] (in Hungarian). Kalligram Könyvkiadó. 2014. ISBN 9786155454189.
- Légzésgyakorlatok [Breathing Exercises] (in Hungarian). Kalligram Könyvkiadó. 2022. ISBN 9789634683100.
- XXX: válogatott, átdolgozott és új queer versek [XXX: selected, revised and new queer poems] (in Hungarian). Okapi Press. 2025. ISBN 9786156954008.

==== Poems ====
- "Ősz" [Autumn]. Új forrás. 29 (6). June 1997. Archived from the original on 26 October 2023.
- "Gesztenye" [Chestnut]. Új forrás. 29 (6). June 1997. Archived from the original on 26 October 2023.
- "Gyümölcstelen barátság" [Fruitless friendship]. Élet és Irodalom. Vol. 43, no. 10. Budapest. 12 March 1999. Archived from the original on 22 February 2025.
- "Az ebéd/Nélkülem" [The Lunch/Without Me]. Élet és Irodalom. Vol. 43, no. 49. Budapest. 10 December 1999.
- "Volt szeretők sétája" [It was a lovers' walk]. Élet és Irodalom. Vol. 45, no. 24. Budapest (published 15 June 2001). 25 February 2003.
- "Napló" [Diary]. Élet és Irodalom. Vol. 45, no. 41. Budapest. 12 October 2001. "New York, 2001. szeptember 13." [New York, September 13, 2001.]
- "Homecoming: beavatás" [Homecoming: initiation]. Élet és Irodalom. Vol. 45, no. 51. Budapest (published 21 December 2001). 11 March 2003. "Mestyán Ádámnak" [To Ádám Mestyán]
- "Áramszünet" [Power outage]. Élet és Irodalom. Vol. 46, no. 4. Budapest (published 25 January 2002). 3 January 2003. "Kiment húsz percre a villany, és mindenki azt hitte: merénylet. Amerika. 2001. október 23." [The electricity went out for twenty minutes, and everyone thought it was an assassination. America. October 23, 2001.]
- "Menekülés New Englandbe" [Escape to New England]. Élet és Irodalom. Vol. 46, no. 4. Budapest (published 25 January 2002). 3 January 2003.
- "Amerikai Color" [American Color]. Élet és Irodalom. Vol. 46, no. 19. Budapest (published 19 May 2002). 11 January 2003. "I. Februári égbolt, II. A zászló színei, III. New England-i október" [I. February sky, II. The colors of the flag, III. New England October]
- "Made in USA/Kísérlet" [Made in USA/Experiment]. Élet és Irodalom. Vol. 46, no. 34. Budapest. 23 August 2002.
- "Temető" [Graveyard]. Élet és Irodalom. Vol. 47, no. 8. Budapest (published 21 February 2003). 24 February 2003.
- "Mellbimbók/Óda a New York-i metróhoz" [Nipples/An ode to the New York subway]. Litera – az irodalmi portál (in Hungarian). 3 January 2003. Archived from the original on 9 January 2023.
- "Szupermarket New Hampshire-ben/Egy csütörtök" [Supermarket in New Hampshire/A Thursday]. Alföld (in Hungarian). Vol. 54, no. 9. Debrecen: Alföld Alapítvány. September 2003. p. 19.
- "Álmatlanság" [Insomnia]. Élet és Irodalom. Vol. 48, no. 15. Budapest (published 9 April 2004). 12 April 2004.
- "Barátok" [Friends]. Élet és Irodalom (in Hungarian). Vol. 49, no. 41. Budapest. 14 October 2005.
- "Búcús londontól" [Farewell to London]. Holmi (in Hungarian). Vol. 19, no. 4. Budapest. April 2007. pp. 467–468.
- "Gerevich András: Aleppo" [András Gerevich: Aleppo]. Litera – az irodalmi portál (in Hungarian). Budapest: Litera.hu. 15 December 2016. Archived from the original on 9 January 2023. "Jó ideje Aleppóról szólnak a hírek. A szíriai várost humanitárius katasztrófa fenyegeti, a négy éve dúló polgáháborúban több mint százezren estek áldozatul. Tegnap tűzszünetet hirdettek, ennek ellenére még mindig tart a vérfürdő. Gerevich András verse a tragédiáról ma hajnalban érkezett szerkesztőségünkhöz." [Aleppo has been in the news for quite some time. The Syrian city is threatened by a humanitarian disaster, more than a hundred thousand people have fallen victim to the civil war that has been raging for four years. A ceasefire was announced yesterday, but the bloodbath is still going on. András Gerevich's poem about the tragedy arrived at our editorial office this morning.]
- "A második balatoni baleset" [The second Balaton accident] (PDF). Kalligram (in Hungarian). Vol. 45. Bratislava: Kalligram Könyvkiadó. December 2016. pp. 46–47. ISSN 1335-1826.
- "Úton hazafele" [On the way home]. seas3.elte.hu (in Hungarian). ELTE School of English and American Studies. 17 February 2017. "Nádasdy Ádámnak" [To Ádám Nádasdy]
- "Folyó/Víz/Tenger/Az egyetemi könyvtár vécéje" [River/Water/Sea/The toilet of the university library]. Alföld (in Hungarian). Debrecen: Alföld Alapítvány (published January 2017). 18 April 2018.
- "Emlék/Vacsora" [Memory/Dinner]. Alföld (in Hungarian). Debrecen: Alföld Alapítvány (published March 2018). 11 June 2018.
- "A tenger virágai" [Flowers of the sea]. Alföld (in Hungarian). Debrecen: Alföld Alapítvány (published October 2019). 17 January 2020. "Rogi Wieg emlékére [In memory of Rogi Wieg]"
- "Határok" [Boundaries]. Alföld (in Hungarian). Debrecen: Alföld Alapítvány (published December 2019). 4 December 2020.
- "Gerevich András: Új időszámítás" [András Gerevich: New time calculation] (in Hungarian). Budapest: Népszava. 9 May 2020.
- "József Attila születése napján - Sikátor" [On the day of Attila József's birth - Alley] (in Hungarian). Budapest: Népszava. 11 April 2021.
- "A dunaparti tigris" [The Tiger on the Danube] (in Hungarian). Litera – az irodalmi portál. 21 July 2021. "Kántor Péter emlékére" [In memory of Péter Kántor]
- "Hamubogyók a tóparton" [Cinderellas on the lake shore]. Alföld (in Hungarian). Cover image by József Szurcsik. Debrecen: Alföld Alapítvány (published November 2021). 6 August 2022.
- "Gerevich András: Csak háborút ne!" [András Gerevich: Just no war!] (in Hungarian). Népszava. 11 April 2022. Archived from the original on 11 April 2022.
- "Esti mese" [Bedtime story]. Élet és Irodalom. Vol. 67, no. 51–52. Budapest. 21 December 2023.
- "Mondóka" [Rhyme]. Élet és Irodalom. Vol. 68, no. 18. Budapest. 2 May 2024.
- "Integet a versből/Vonatút" [Waving from the poem/Train journey]. Alföld (in Hungarian). Cover image by Adél Mikes. Debrecen. 15 April 2025.
- "Emberszám" [Number of people]. Élet és Irodalom (in Hungarian). Vol. 69, no. 25. Budapest. 20 June 2025.

==== Thesis ====
- Seamus Heaney and the Ulster conflict (M.A. thesis). ELTE School of English and American Studies. 2000. OCLC 1108104366.
- A Poet's Journey (M.A.L.S. thesis). Dartmouth College publications. 2010. OCLC 666526159.

==== Translations ====
- Heaney, Seamus (1997). Különös gyümölcs [Strange Fruit]. Translated by Gerevich, András; Fodor, András; Géher, István; Mesterházi, Mónika; Poós, Zoltán; Tandori, Dezső. Orpheusz Könyvkiadó. ISBN 9789637971990.
- Bruce, George; Crichton, Iain Smith; MacCaig, Norman; Morgan, Edwin; Dunn, Douglas; Duffy, Carol Ann (1998). Kapu a tengerhez: Kortárs skót költők antológiája [A Gateway to the Sea: Anthology of Contemporary Scottish Poetry]. Translated by Gerevich, András; Balikó, Nándor; Sándor, Beáta. ELTE School of English and American Studies. ISBN 9789634631842.
- Johnson, Paul (1999). Értelmiségiek [Intellectuals]. Translated by Gerevich, András; Horváth, László Gy.; Lukács, Laura; Nagy, Nóra; Rodics, Eszter; Walkóné, Ágnes Békés; Somogyi, László Pál; Elekes, Dóra. Európa Könyvkiadó. ISBN 9630764946.
- Sandell, Håkan (2003). Mintha valamire várna az ég [As if the sky is waiting for something]. Translated by Gerevich, András; Szabó, Anna T.; Varró, Dániel. József Attila Kör. ISBN 9789639500570.
- Lynch, David (2007). Hogyan fogjunk nagy halat? [How to catch big fish?]. Kalligram Könyvkiadó. ISBN 9788071499640.
- Heaney, Seamus (2010). Hűlt hely [Cold Place]. Translated by Gerevich, András; Győző, Ferencz; Imreh, András; Mesterházi, Mónika. Kalligram Könyvkiadó. ISBN 9788081012716.
- Dick, Philip K. (2015). 'Az ember a Fellegvárban [The Man in the High Castle]. Agave Könyvek. ISBN 9786155522512.
- Heaney, Seamus (2016). Élőlánc [Human Chain]. Translated by Gerevich, András; Győző, Ferencz; Imreh, András; Mesterházi, Mónika. Jelenkor Könyvkiadó. ISBN 9789636765750.
- O'Hara, Frank (2020). Töprengések vészhelyzetben [Meditations in an Emergency]. Translated by Gerevich, András; Krusovszky, Dénes. Magvető Könyvdyádó. ISBN 9789631436143.
- Trethewey, Natasha; Shaughnessy, Brenda; Chiasson, Dan; Smith, Tracy K.; Brown, Jericho; Kaminsky, Ilya; Diaz, Natalie; Lerner, Ben; Faizullah, Tarfia; Lockwood, Patricia (2022). Gerevich, András (ed.). Nem lövöm fejbe magam. 11 kortárs amerikai költő [I'm not shooting myself in the head. 11 Contemporary American Poets]. Translated by Gerevich, András; Lanczkor, Gábor; Závada, Péter; Simon, Márton; Deres, Kornélia; Fenyvesi, Orsolya; Ferencz, Mónika; Bakucz, Dóra; Izsó, Zita; Vajdics, Anikó. Petőfi Cultural Agency. ISBN 9786156244246.

=== Filmography ===
Year	Title	Writer	Director	Notes	Ref.
2004	Loved	Yes	No	short	
2004	Heron People	Yes	No	short	
2006	A Different Dish	Yes	No	short	
2006	Synchronoff	Yes	No	short	
2006	Immeasurable	Yes	No	short	
2006	Forget Me Not	Yes	No	short	
2006	Mother and Son	Yes	Yes	short	
2019	Natural Backlight – Portrait of Péter Nádas	No	No	consultant	

=== Plays ===
Playwright

Year	Title	Venue	Ref.
2008	Csillagfiú (Starchild)	Budapesti Bábszínház	
2011	A sünteknős (The Sea urchin)	Stúdió K.	

=== Radio ===
- Assistant producer, Poetry by Post, BBC World Service, 2004

== Prizes and honours ==
- 2020: Alföld Prize

== See also ==
- Monika Rinck – translated Gerevich's work into German.
- Nikolay Boykov – translated Gerevich's work into Bulgarian.
