= List of magazines in Hungary =

The following is an incomplete list of current and defunct magazines published in Hungary. They may be published in Hungarian or in other languages.

== Numerical titles ==
- 168 Óra

== A ==
- A Tett
- Aero magazin
- Aurora
- Autó-Motor

== B ==
- Blikk Nők
- Blikk Nők Extra
- Blikk Nők Konyha
- Blikk Nők Otthon & Kert
- Budapest Business Journal
- Bors

== C ==
- Cannabis Kultusz
- Company

== D ==
- Diplomat
- Dörmögő Dömötör
- DIZKO Magazin

== E ==
- Élet és Irodalom
- Ellenfény
- Eszmélet
- Ezermester

== F ==
- Familia
- Fanny
- Fényszóró
- Figyelő
- Funzine

== G ==
- Galaktika

== H ==
- Helyi Téma
- Hetek
- Heti Válasz
- Heti Világgazdaság
- Hócipő
- Hot!

== I ==
- Indóház
- Infermental
- Interpress Magazin

== K ==
- Kiskegyed
- Kiskegyed Extra
- Kiskegyed Konyhája
- Kritika
- Korunk

== L ==
- Lakáskultúra
- Látkép
- Literatura Mondo
- Luceafărul
- Lúdas Matyi

== M ==
- MA
- Magyar Demokrata
- Magyar Narancs
- Magyar Tudomány
- Mandiner
- Mások

== N ==
- Na végre!
- Nők Lapja
- Nyugat

== O ==
- Otthon

== P ==
- Prima Konyha
- Pszichológia

== R ==
- Reform

== S ==
- Színes RTV

== T ==
- Tennisz és Golf
- Trade Magazine
- Turán

== V ==
- Vidék íze
- Vitorlázás

== See also ==
- Media of Hungary
- List of newspapers in Hungary
