= Balázs Birtalan =

- Born: October 12, 1969
- Died: May 14, 2016 (aged 46)
- Occupation: Author, poet, publicist and psychotherapist

Balázs Birtalan (October 12, 1969 – May 14, 2016) was a Hungarian author, poet, publicist, and psychotherapist, mostly known for his participation in the gay Christian movement in Hungary. He was the son of the poet Ferenc Birtalan.

His first poems were published at the age of ten; he has been publishing regularly since the age of 14. He attended the Eötvös József High School in Budapest and graduated in 1988. Raised as non-religious, he became a Christian on February 12, 1989, which was a life-changing experience for him; he was baptized as a Roman Catholic one week later. Between 1990 and 1992, he studied theology at the Esztergom College of Theology and joined a Christian community, from which he was shut out because of his homosexuality in 1993. This led to his launching of the gay Christian movement in Hungary with his friends. They founded the communities Bíborpalást ["Scarlet Robe"] and Öt Kenyér ["Five Loaves of Bread"] afterwards, in which he took an active part for more than a decade.

In 1995 and 1996, he studied psychology at the Eötvös Loránd University in Budapest. He took an intermediate level language exam in English and an advanced level one in Esperanto. Between 1988 and 1998, he earned a living by selling books and CDs; between 1996 and 1997, he taught English. After 1998, he worked at a notary public's office, editing legal instruments. In 2005–2006, he completed the 200-hour method-specific course of the Integrative Psychotherapy Association.

He started publishing a blog in 2005. His main topics included religion, compassionate communication, sustainable development, literature, psychology, sociology and philosophy. A collection of his essays, formerly published in his blog, was published in 2008 as a book. From early 2009 on, he didn't consider himself a Christian any more. His online nicknames Feanor and Izmael refer to the two authors who significantly shaped his worldview, J. R. R. Tolkien and Daniel Quinn.

== Works ==
From 1983 on, several of his poems, articles, and essays were published in these periodicals:

- children's and young adults' magazines (Kincskereső, Ifjúsági Magazin, Magyar Ifjúság)
- daily papers (Népszabadság, Népszava) and weekly papers (Kapu, Magyar Narancs)
- literary and cultural journals (Élet és Irodalom, Mozgó Világ, Új Tükör)
- specialist periodicals (Fundamentum, Közjegyzők Közlönye, Mások), as well as
- Church magazines (Egyházfórum, Keresztény Szó, Marana Tha, Mérleg, Új Ember).

His collection of poems, B változat ("Version B") was published in 1995. His newer poems are:

- A Garland of Memories – A Crown of Sonnets from 1992
- Poems, 1992–1996
- Poems from 2005 on
- Artificial Flowers on the Altar of Symbolism (2009)

His collection of essays, Dried Plums at Sunset – Meme Stories was published in late 2008, edited from his blog posts of the preceding years. It addresses a wide range of themes, including biographical writings, sustainable development, compassionate communication, psychology, psychotherapy and hypnosis, Harry Potter, society and tolerance, church, its dogmas, and theology.

A complete edition of his blog posts was published posthumously in 2017, titled Without a Script, in 1,000 pages (ISBN 9789634193050), with recommendation by the psychologist Tamás Vekerdy.

== Gay activism ==
Between 1995 and 2003, he took an active part in Christian gay activism, fighting both the homophobia of the Church and the anti-religious stance of gay communities. His book Halállal lakoljanak? ("Shall They Be Put to Death?") was published in 1997. A documentary with the same title was made in 2003, centered around the author, directed by Bernadett Frivaldszky. He held several lectures in this topic at several conferences. Válaszd az életet! ("Choose Life!") is the shortened version of his book, reworked from a Protestant point of view. It was published in 2004.

== Death ==
Balázs Birtalan died on 14 May 2016 following a three-year long battle with cancer.
