= Friends (poetry collection) =

2009 book by András Gerevich

- Author: András Gerevich
- Original title: Barátok
- Language: Hungarian
- Genre: Poetry
- Publisher: Kalligram Könyvkiadó
- Publication date: 2009
- Publication place: Slovakia
- Media type: Print
- Pages: 81
- ISBN: 8-081-01170-6
- OCLC: 1086349815
- Preceded by: Men (2005)
- Followed by: Sixteen Sunsets (2014)

Friends (Hungarian: Barátok (Note: The term 'barátok' in Hungarian is used for both “Friends” and “Boyfriends”, the title implies both.); Hungarian pronunciation: [ˈbɒraːtok]) is the third poetry collection by András Gerevich. It was first published in 2009 by Kalligram Könyvkiadó.

The poems in the book are arranged into four cycles and explore three themes: childhood traumas, homosexual relationships, and life abroad.

== Contents ==
- "Búcsú Londontól" (Farewell to London)
- "Családi időszámítás" (Family Time)
- "Októberi reggel" (October Morning)
- "Naphegy tér" (Naphegy Square)
- "Gyermekem" (My Child)
- "Anya és fia" (Mother and Son)
- "Apa" (Father)
- "Gyermekkori sötét szobák" (Childhood Dark Rooms)
- "Garázs" (Garage)
- "Baross utca" (Baross Street)
- "Barátok" (Friends or Boyfriends)
- "Inszomnia" (Insomnia)
- "Fénykép" (Photo)
- "A francia mozis" (The French Cinema)
- "Stalker"
- "MY EX"
- "Roquebrune-Cap-Martin"
- "Buli" (Party)
- "Régi barátok" (Old Friends)
- "Alig ismertem" (I hardly knew you)
- "Buszon" (On the Bus)
- "Vacsora" (Dinner)
- "Mentás birka" (Mint Sheep)
- "A vak fiú" (The blind boy)
- "Két férfi" (Two men)
- "Erzsébet-híd" (Elizabeth bridge)
- "Marmaris"
- "Joe"
- "Getno"
- "Rally"
- "Add nekem" (Give it to me)
- Madár" (Bird)
- "Matrac" (Mattress)
- "Zöld" (Green)
- "Tükör" (Mirror)
- "Mosoly" (Smile)
- "Napolaj" (Sun oil)
- "Állatok" (Animals)
- "Párhuzam" (Parallel)
- "London"
- "Egészséges" (Healthy)
- "Verjen a Sors keze 2007" (Beat the Hand of Fate 2007)
- "Holland Park"
- "London Bridge"
- "Vauxhall"
- "Waterloo"

== Reception ==
Péter Demény of Élet és Irodalom called the collection "nice and beautiful". He further wrote that "It's beautiful, because desire, passion and suffering (at least since Denis de Rougemont, we know that these two go together), loneliness, soul anguish, and guilt can be heard in good poems." Csaba Báthori, writing for Magyar Narancs, praised the overall volume, writing, "András Gerevich's poetry is able to dissolve it into a poetic grayscale, and in the third third of the poem, he snappily summarizes what he depicted before. The drawing of hot primary sensations is mostly perceptive and usually leads to important, meaningful statements (or begins with such a memorable statement)." But he criticised some poems by writing, "here and there the poems cannot yet master what the body has experienced into a work of art; they cannot transmit the poet's emotions to the reader; they cannot turn the direct impressions of soulless flesh into a spiritual-poetic figure." Litera's György Vári wrote, "Despite the occasional clumsiness of some of the poems in the collection, Barátok is one of the most important volumes of poetry in recent years."

Imre Payer of PRAE, praised "intentional free verse form" and "metaphor-less verse speech" in the volume by writing, "The emphasis on visuality and new sensibility is also proven by the fact that András Gerevich is especially good at composition. He knows and has mastered classical topical and acoustic tech very well" Endre Balogh, the owner of PRAE later described it as “one of the most important Hungarian books of poetry in the year 2009.“

Homoerotic themes in the volume were also praised. Viktória Radics of Revizor, wrote, “András Gerevich, who until now attracted attention with his openness about sex between men in poetry, has now crossed the line of breaking the taboo. These current poems are shockingly good not because they write about the strange erotic-sexual experiences and bizarreness of gay relationships, but because they touch on the height and depth of love, sometimes even capture it.“ Könyves Magazine wrote, “Barátok goes beyond the poetics of chest hair in the poems the homosexual theme is objectified in such a way that the experience material of the lyrical self holds exciting possibilities even for the reader who is not familiar with the homosexual experience.“

In 2023, Zsigmond Kassai in his article Queer Hungarian Literature: On a Path Out of Isolation for Hungarian Literature Online, wrote, "Barátok, his third volume, achieves another important innovation in Gerevich’s poetic world. It highlights the consequences of biological infertility on a gay man’s life, a question which comes to be a defining element of the gay male perspective in Gerevich’s own poetry and in gay poetry more broadly. Furthermore, this aspect is growing more and more miserable nowadays as it is now illegal in Hungary for LGBTQ persons to adopt."
