= 1980 Veszprém attack =

Spree shooting in Veszprém, Hungary

- Veszprém (Hungary)
- Location: 47.09716°N 17.90102°E; Veszprém, Hungary
- Date: 11 September 1980; 46 years ago
- Target: Random people
- Attack type: Mass shooting, spree shooting, murder–suicide
- Weapons: Assault rifle Grenades
- Deaths: 3 (including the perpetrator)
- Injuries: 10
- Perpetrators: 23-year-old soldier

On 11 September 1980, a gunman opened fire at multiple locations in Veszprém, Hungary. A 23-year-old soldier, armed with a rifle and several grenades, attacked random people. Two people and the perpetrator were killed, and ten others were wounded. Blikk called the attack "one of the most brutal crimes under the Kádár government".

== Attack ==
On 10 September 1980, the shooter, aged 23, deserted from his barracks, armed with an assault rifle, 270 rounds of ammunition, and 10 hand grenades. The following day, he opened fire near the Bishop's Palace, shooting and throwing hand grenades at workers renovating the building. He then traveled towards Patak Square, shooting random people and killing one. When he reached Jókai street, the gunman shot at people and also threw a hand grenade at a car. He then killed himself. More than 90 shots were fired, and four grenades were detonated.

== Aftermath ==
News of the crime was suppressed by the Communist government. In 2020, forty years after the shooting, RTL released a two-part documentary covering the attack.
