= Zsolt Bayer =

Hungarian journalist

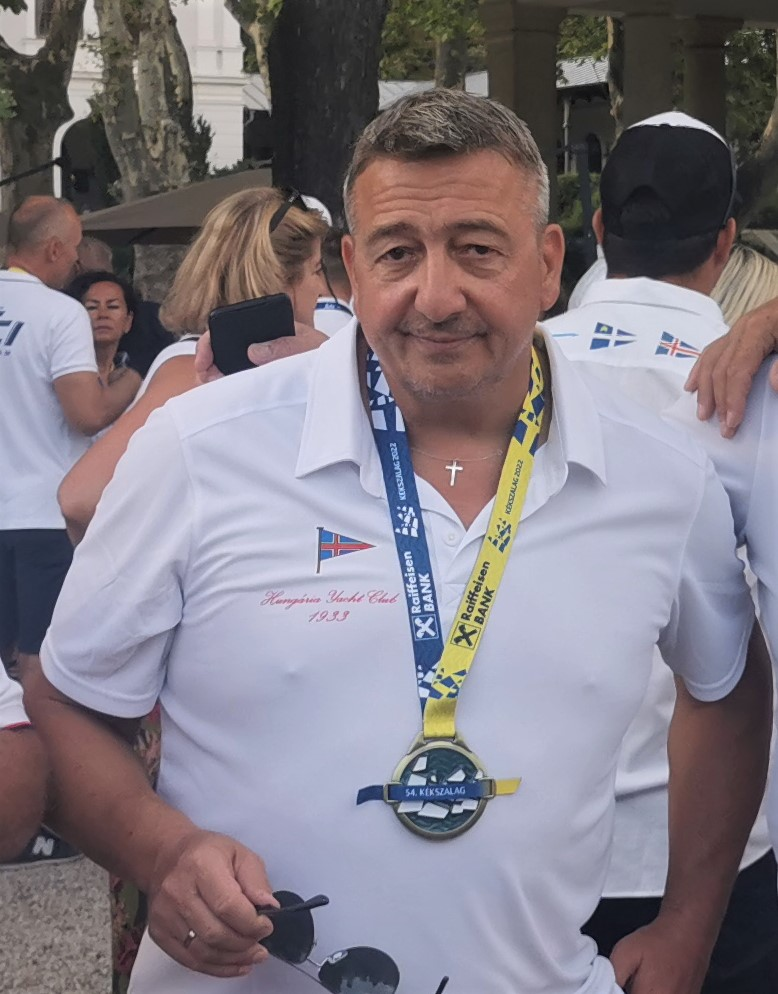
- Zsolt Bayer in 2022
- Born: 26 February 1963 (age 63); Budapest, Hungary
- Occupation: Journalist
- Political party: Fidesz

Zsolt Bayer (born 26 February 1963) is a Hungarian far-right and pro-Russian journalist and Fidesz propagandist, whose views have been widely described as racist, homophobic, transphobic, and antisemitic. He was a co-founder of the ruling Fidesz party and close confidant of Prime Minister Viktor Orbán. He is the owner of party membership card No. 5.. Bayer has written for several Hungarian newspapers and media outlets, including Magyar Nemzet and Magyar Hírlap, and remains a prominent public figure in Hungary’s political media landscape.

== Views and incidents ==
In a 2011 article for Magyar Hírlap, Bayer referred to Jews as "stinking excrement called something like Cohen". The previous year, he said the Hungarian Academy of Science had been affected by Jewish infiltration. In the Austrian daily Die Presse, the journalist Karl Pfeifer described Bayer as a "fecal anti-Semite" in an article published during 2011.

In 2013, Bayer wrote an opinion piece for Magyar Hírlap referring to the killings of Marian Cozma and Gergely Sávoly, where Roma were suspected of involvement, and commented that many gypsies are "animals... unfit to live among people" and "potential murderers [who] should not exist." The article generated negative reactions in Hungary and throughout Europe. A Fidesz spokeswoman said that Bayer's views were his own, while Fidesz communications chief Máté Kocsis said critics of Bayer's article were "siding with" Roma murderers. The Hungarian Media Authority fined the journal 250,000 forints and ordered the content removed from the Internet. Bayer said in 2016 that Pope Francis was “either a senile old fool or a scoundrel” for his pro-refugee sentiments.

In a November 2020 opinion article in Magyar Nemzet titled "Breaking the Taboo", Bayer called black criminals "niggers". The article was later censored by Magyar Nemzet.

In December 2020, Bayer said on HírTV that an "old friend and comrade" admitted to him two decades ago that he liked to go to Thailand "because young boys were also available", indicating Bayer had knowledge about sexual abuse of minors. There is no record showing that Bayer ever reported this to the relevant authorities.

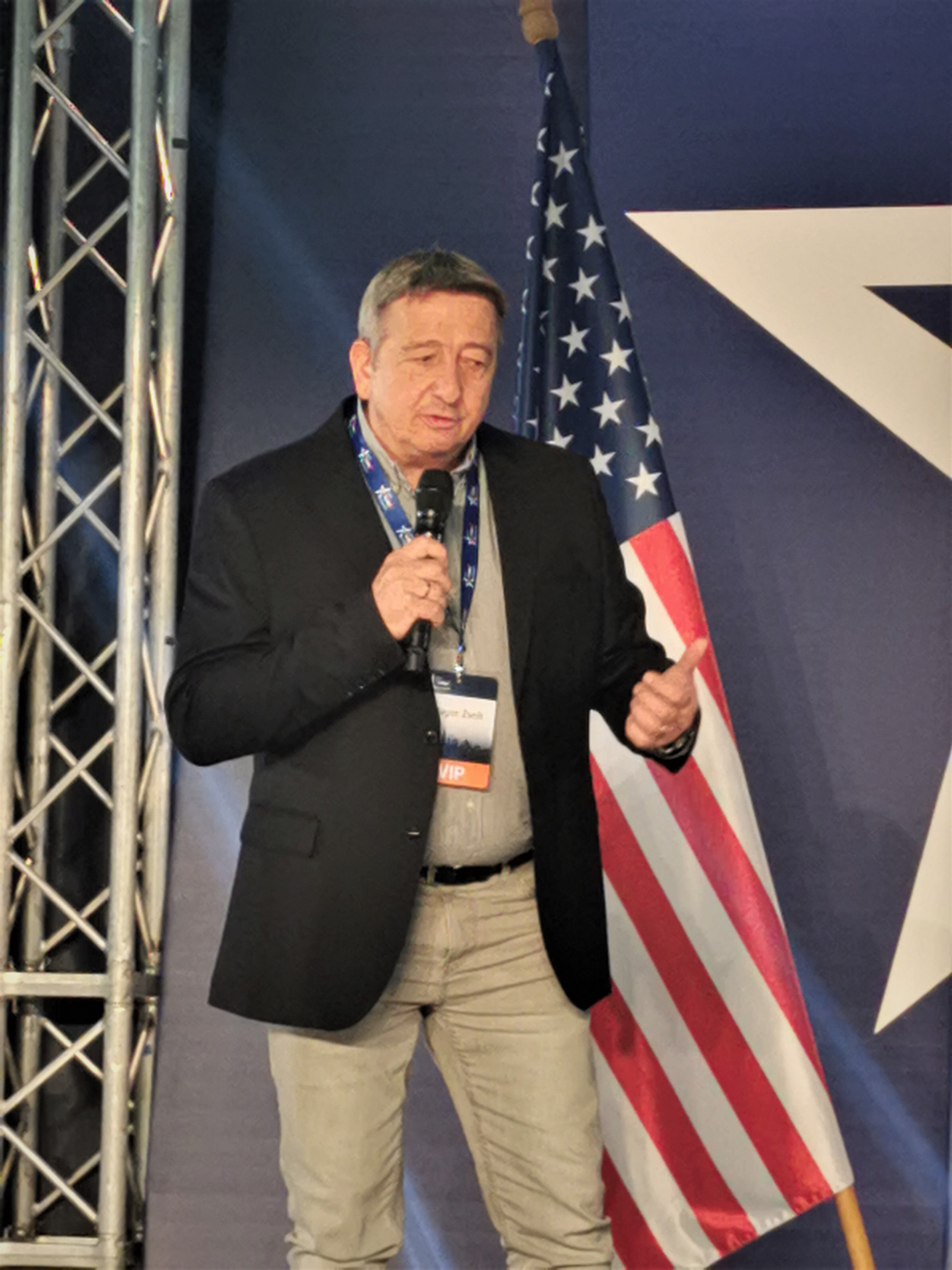
Bayer at the 2022 Conservative Political Action Conference in Hungary

In 2022, he promoted pro-Russian views during the Russian invasion of Ukraine. He was one of the speakers at the 2022 Conservative Political Action Conference in Hungary.

In early 2024 historian Krisztián Ungváry published his findings that Bayer's grandfather Károly Gyimes, whom Bayer previously portrayed as someone who saved Jews during the Holocaust, was in fact an active member of the Arrow Cross Party before and during World War II, and later he was an informant for the State Protection Authority. Bayer has been well-known for attacking his political opponents for having parents or grandparents who supported the Communist regime. Bayer declared that he did not know about his grandfather's past.

== Award ==
In August 2016, he was awarded the Knight's Cross of the Hungarian Order of Merit for his writing by Prime Minister Orbán. By early September, 100 previous recipients of Hungarian state awards, among them president of the Lantos Foundation, Katrina Swett, returned them in protest at the decision to honour Bayer.
