= Möge =

13th-century Mongol prince, son of Tolui

- Born: c. late 1215
- Died: after January 1261
- Issue: Chingtüm (Changtong); Ebügen
- House: Borjigin
- Father: Tolui
- Mother: Saruq

Möge (Chinese: 末哥; pinyin: Mògē; also written 莫哥 or 穆哥 in Chinese sources, and transcribed Muge or Mögä; c. late 1215 – after January 1261) was a Mongol prince of the Borjigin line, the eighth son of Tolui and the child of Tolui's Naiman concubine Saruq. He held an appanage and a princely establishment in north China under his half-brother Möngke, commanded one of the columns of the Mongol invasion of Sichuan in 1258, and was the ancestor of the line of the princes of Yongning under the Yuan dynasty.

== Birth and family ==
According to Rashid al-Din, Saruq was also the wet nurse of Möge's half-brother Kublai. Genghis Khan, remarking that the infant Kublai was "swarthy like his maternal uncles", directed that he be given to a good nurse, and he was entrusted to Saruq. When Möge was born two months later, his mother gave him to a nurse of the Tangut to be reared, and suckled Kublai herself. Since Kublai was born in 1215, this probably places Möge's own birth in the closing months of that year.

Saruq was also the mother of Tolui's second son Jörike, who died young and left no issue.

== Career ==
During the succession disputes that followed the death of Güyük Khan, Möge accompanied his half-brothers Möngke and Ariq Böke to the assembly convened by Batu. When Möngke persisted in refusing the khanate, Möge rose to his feet and argued that all present had promised and given written undertakings to abide by Batu's decision. Batu praised the intervention, and Möngke then assented, taking the throne in 1251.

Under Möngke, Möge held an appanage and a princely establishment in north China. His establishment is attested in the gui-chou year (1253), when it appointed the official Chen You (陳祐) as its shangshu, and his appanage lands lay in the Shan–Luo (陝、洛) region; Chen You was thereafter recommended by the prince as governor-general of Henan-fu. The Shihuo zhi records his annual grant as 50 ingots of silver and 300 bolts of silk, and notes that in the ding-si year (1257) 5,552 households of Henan-fu were allotted to him for the five-household silk levy.

Rashid al-Din lists Möge among the princes of the right hand appointed to Möngke's army for the campaign against the Song dynasty. During the invasion of 1258 the army, numbering 40,000 but announced as 100,000, advanced in three columns: Möngke himself moved from Longzhou through the Dasan Pass (散關), Möge from Yangzhou (洋州; in modern Yang County, Shaanxi) through Micang Pass (米倉關) toward Sichuan, and a third column advanced from Yuguan toward Mianzhou.

After Möngke died at Diaoyu Mountain in 1259, Möge sent a messenger from Diaoyu Mountain in Hezhou to inform Kublai of the khan's death and to ask him to return north "to bind the hopes of the realm", on the eve of the Toluid Civil War between Kublai and Ariq Böke. Kublai's official Zhao Liangbi subsequently reported that the prince harboured no disloyal intent, and recommended that the Liupan region and the southwest be entrusted to him entirely. Rashid al-Din likewise shows Möge still at the head of troops of the right hand that had accompanied Möngke.

== Death ==
The date of Möge's death is uncertain, and the Persian and Chinese sources do not agree. Rashid al-Din states only that "as for Möge he had died during the campaign", in a narrative that sets this before the enthronement of Ariq Böke, whereas the Yuan shi records a grant of 2,500 liang of silver to Prince Möge in the twelfth month of Zhongtong 1 (January 1261), which is his last dated appearance.

== Descendants ==
Rashid al-Din gives Möge two sons, Chingtüm and Ebügen, without naming their mother. Chingtüm is identified with the Changtong (昌童) of the Chinese sources, who appears in the Yuan shi genealogical table as Möge's successor. That table traces the line as Möge, Changtong, Bo-Temür (伯帖木兒) and 伯顏木兒, while the table of princes gives the Yongning prince's (永寧王) name as 卜顏帖木兒 (Buyan-Temür) and adds a later holder, Maoze (卯澤), enfeoffed in 1330; the two forms of the name are inconsistent.

== Sources ==
- Çelik, Burak (December 2020). "Cengiz Han Oğlu Toluy I: Ailesi" [Genghis Khan's Son Tolui I: His Family]. Selçuk Üniversitesi Türkiyat Araştırmaları Dergisi (in Turkish) (50): 375–393. doi:10.21563/sutad.860977.
- ʿAlāʾ al-Dīn ʿAṭā Malik Juvaynī (1958). The History of the World-Conqueror. Translated by Boyle, John Andrew. Manchester: Manchester University Press.
- Rashīd al-Dīn (1971). The Successors of Genghis Khan. Translated by Boyle, John Andrew. New York: Columbia University Press.
- Rossabi, Morris (1988). Khubilai Khan: His Life and Times. Berkeley: University of California Press. ISBN 978-0-520-05913-9.
- Song Lian (1976) [1370]. Yuan shi 元史 (in Chinese). Beijing: Zhonghua Shuju.
