= ÉS =

ÉS may refer to:

- Élet és Irodalom, or ÉS, a weekly Hungarian magazine
- éS, a skateboarding footwear and apparel brand of Sole Technology
