= Inner Asia =

Historical region over time

Map of Inner Asia, showing the extent of the area studied by the Sinor Research Institute for Inner Asian Studies, located at Indiana University in the United States

Map of Inner Asia, showing the extent of the area studied by the CIAS at the University of Toronto

Inner Asia refers to the interior regions covering Central Asia, as well as parts of East Asia, European Russia, North Asia, and South Asia. It includes parts of North China (Inner Mongolia) and Western China (Tibet and Xinjiang), as well as southern Siberia. The area overlaps with some definitions of "Central Asia", mostly the historical ones, but certain regions that are often included in Inner Asia, such as Manchuria, are not a part of Central Asia by any of its definitions. Inner Asia may be regarded as the northern and western "frontier" of China proper and as being bounded by East Asia proper, which consists of China proper, Japan, Korea, and Taiwan.

The extent of Inner Asia has been understood differently in different periods. "Inner Asia" is sometimes contrasted to "China proper", that is, the territories originally unified under the Qin dynasty with majority Han populations. By the year 1800, Chinese Inner Asia consisted of four main regions, namely Manchuria (comprising Inner Manchuria and Outer Manchuria), Mongolia (comprising Inner Mongolia and Outer Mongolia), Tibet (mainly comprising modern-day Qinghai, western Sichuan, and the Tibet Autonomous Region), and Xinjiang (a.k.a. Chinese Turkestan or East Turkestan). Many of these areas had been only recently conquered by the Qing dynasty of China and, during most of the Qing period, they were governed through administrative structures different from those of the older Chinese provinces. A Qing government agency, the Lifan Yuan, supervised the empire's Inner Asian regions, also known as Chinese Tartary. The frontier regions of China proper—Gansu, Qinghai, Sichuan, and Yunnan—are also sometimes included as part of Inner Asia.

== Definition and usage ==
Alternative conception of Inner Asia showing the Mongolian (or Mongolian-related) areas of Inner Asia that are represented in the Mongolian Digital Ethnography Archive.

"Inner Asia" today has a range of definitions and usages. Denis Sinor, for example, used "Inner Asia" in contrast to agricultural civilizations, noting its changing borders, such as when a Roman province was taken by the Huns, areas of North China were occupied by the Mongols, or Anatolia came under Turkish influence, eradicating Hellenistic culture.

Scholars or historians of the Qing dynasty, such as those who compiled the New Qing History, often use the term "Inner Asia" when studying Qing interests or reigns outside China proper, although previous Chinese dynasties like the Han, Tang, and Ming dynasties also expanded their realms and influences into Inner Asia.

According to Morris Rossabi, Inner Asia is composed not only of the five Central Asian countries, which includes Turkmenistan, Uzbekistan, Tajikistan, Kyrgyzstan, and Kazakhstan, but also includes Afghanistan, Xinjiang, Mongolia, Manchuria, and parts of Iran.

The Committee on Inner Asian and Altaic Studies of Harvard University defines Inner Asia as a region consisting of Russian Turkestan, Xinjiang, Eastern Iran, Northern Pakistan, Afghanistan, Tibet, Qinghai, Sichuan, Gansu, and northwestern Yunnan.

The Mongolia and Inner Asia Studies Unit at the University of Cambridge defines Inner Asia as "an area centred on Mongolia and extending across the region of the great steppes to the Himalayas", including Kazakhstan, Kyrgyzstan, Tajikistan, Uzbekistan, Xinjiang, Tibet, Qinghai, Gansu, Sichuan, Yunnan, Nepal, Sikkim, Bhutan, Inner Mongolia, Liaoning, Jilin, Heilongjiang, Altai, Tuva, Buryatia, and Chita.

== In other languages ==
In French, Asie centrale can mean either "Central Asia" or "Inner Asia", while Mongolia and Tibet are grouped as Haute Asie (lit. 'Upper Asia').

The terms meaning "Inner Asia" in the languages of Inner Asia itself are all modern translations of terms in European languages, mostly Russian.

== Related terms ==
=== Central Asia ===
"Central Asia" normally denotes the western part of Inner Asia; that is, Kazakhstan, Kyrgyzstan, Tajikistan, Turkmenistan, and Uzbekistan, with Afghanistan sometimes also included as part of Central Asia. However, the Library of Congress' subject classification system treats "Central Asia" and Inner Asia as synonymous.

=== Central Eurasia ===
Historian Morris Rossabi posits that the "Inner Asia" is the established term for the area in relevant literature. Historian Denis Sinor believed the term was deficient, particularly as it implies an "Outer Asia" that in fact has no agreed-upon meaning or common usage. As an alternative, Sinor proposed the neologism "Central Eurasia" to emphasize the region's history in transcontinental exchange, e.g., as territories of the Silk Road. According to Sinor:

The definition that can be given of Central Eurasia in space is negative. It is that part of the continent of Eurasia that lies beyond the borders of the great sedentary civilizations.... Although the area of Central Eurasia is subject to fluctuations, the general trend is that of diminution. With the territorial growth of the sedentary civilizations, their borderline extends and offers a larger surface on which new layers of barbarians will be deposited.

== Origin of Inner Asian studies ==
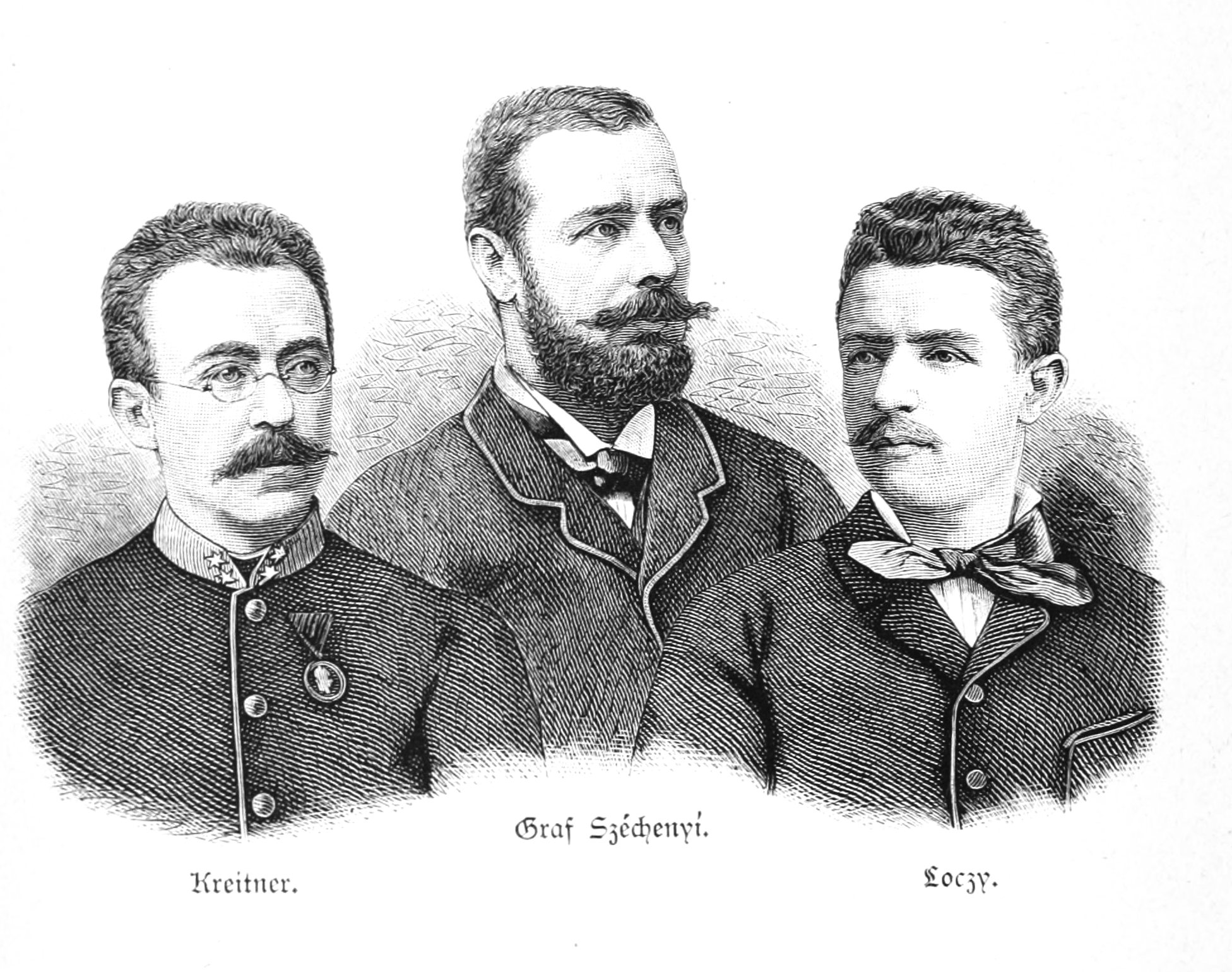
Gustav Kreitner, Béla Széchenyi, and Lajos Lóczy led an expedition to Inner Asia in 1877–1880.

Central Europe is the birthplace of Inner Asian studies in the West. Hungarian explorers and scholars of the early 19th century traveled to Inner Asia with an attempt to uncover their own Magyar prehistory. The linguist Sándor Kőrösi Csoma (1784 – 1842) was the first among these explorers; he later became a founder of Tibetology. Count Béla Széchenyi led a scientific expedition to Inner Asia in 1877–1880; he later founded the Hungarian journal Turán in 1913. The term "Inner Asian studies" (Hungarian: belső-ázsiai kutatások; German: innerasiatische Studien) first appeared in the masthead of Turán. The periodical's name refers to the historical region in Central Asia known as Turan.

In the first two decades of the 20th century, Hungarian-British archaeologist Aurel Stein made important discoveries over the course of his four expeditions to Inner Asia. In 1928, Stein published Innermost Asia: Detailed Report of Explorations in Central Asia, Kan-su and Eastern Iran, Carried Out and Described under the Orders of H.M. Indian Government in four volumes. In 1940, the first academic chair for Inner Asian studies was established by the Hungarian Orientalist and linguist Lajos Ligeti at the University of Budapest.

== See also ==
- Western Regions
- Nomadic empire
- Eurasianism
- Indo-Pacific Asia, the rest of Asia
- Pan-Mongolism
- Turco-Mongols
- Turanism
- Tartary
- Division of the Mongol Empire
- Southern Russia
- North Russia
- Yuan dynasty in Inner Asia
- History of Manchuria
- History of Mongolia
- History of Tibet
- History of Xinjiang
