= Budapester Zeitung =

German-language weekly newspaper published in Budapest, Hungary

Budapester Zeitung Logo

Budapester Zeitung (BZT) is a privately owned German-language weekly newspaper published in Budapest, Hungary. It was established in April 1999 and has a circulation of about 7000 copies. Since 2003 there has been an English-language sister newspaper, The Budapest Times. It is published by BZT Media Kft, founded by Berlin-born Jan Mainka.

Since early 2014, BZT has been published in magazine format. Aimed primarily at German-language businessmen and diplomats living in Hungary, it covers politics, the economy, culture and local events as well as world news.
