= Ellenfény =

Hungarian theatre magazine

- Categories: Theatre and art magazine
- First issue: 1996
- Final issue: December 2007 (print)
- Country: Hungary
- Based in: Budapest
- Language: Hungarian
- Website: Ellenfény
- ISSN: 1416-499X
- OCLC: 50511908

Ellenfény (Hungarian pronunciation: [ˈɛlːɛɱfeːɲ]) is an online Hungarian language art and theatre magazine published in Budapest, Hungary. It was a print publication between 1996 and 2007.

== History and profile ==
Ellenfény was established in 1996. Új Színházért Alpítvány is the publisher of Ellenfény, which is based in Budapest. In December 2007 print edition of the magazine ceased publication, and it became an online magazine. Although magazine is published in Hungarian, it also provides English summaries of the articles. The magazine primarily focuses on contemporary dance and theatre.

Beja Margitházi, a film theoretician, is among the contributors of the magazine.

== See also ==
- List of magazines in Hungary
