= Chroma: A Queer Literary Journal =

British LGBTQ literary magazine

- Categories: LGBT Literary Magazine
- Frequency: Semi-annually
- Founded: 2004
- Final issue: July 2010
- Country: United Kingdom
- Language: English
- Website: chromajournal.co.uk

Chroma: A Queer Literary Journal was a UK-based international literary and arts journal publishing and promoting the work of lesbian, gay, bisexual and transgender writers and artists. It was founded in 2004. The journal appeared twice a year and was supported by funding from Arts Council England. The journal was edited by the writer, Shaun Levin, and the poet, Saradha Soobrayen, and had four commissioning editors, András Gerevich, Sophie Mayer, Andrew Theophilou, and Mike Upton. Some of the queer writers that was featured included Ben Barton, John Dixon, Jay Merill, Keith Munro, Uriel Orlow, Drew Payne, Mima Simic and Andrew Warburton. The journal also held an annual writing competition. The journal's last issue (No 11) was published in June 2010. An announcement on the journal's website explains that changes in funding arrangements with the Arts Council of England meant the journal would "take a break" in Autumn 2010 and return in Spring 2011 with a youth number. This issue did not appear.
