= Kritika (magazine) =

Hungarian monthly literary magazine

- Editor: Erno Balogh
- Categories: Literary magazine; cultural magazine; political magazine
- Frequency: Monthly
- Publisher: Népszabadság Zrt.
- Founded: 1963; 62 years ago
- First issue: September 1963
- Country: Hungary
- Based in: Budapest
- Language: Hungarian
- Website: Kritika
- ISSN: 0023-4818
- OCLC: 487590245

Kritika (Hungarian pronunciation: [ˈkritikɒ], Hungarian: Critique) is a monthly political, cultural and literary magazine published in Budapest, Hungary. It has been in circulation since 1963.

== History and profile ==
The first issue of Kritika appeared in September 1963, and it was the official organ of the Institute of Literary Studies. The Hungarian Literary History Society and the Association of Hungarian Writers were also partners of the magazine which published reviews, aesthetic studies primarily on fiction, music and cinema. The founding editors-in-chief were András Diószegi and Antal Wéber. Later Wéber was replaced by Miklós Almási in the post. Its most active collaborators were Miklós Béládi Zoltán Kenyeres and Béla Pomogáts who continued to work for the magazine until 1971. During this period the magazine strictly followed the Marxist-Leninist ideology and featured interviews one of which was with the poet Gyula Illyés. However, Kritika left its focus on realism and socialist literary criticism in 1966 and began to cover articles on structuralism.

In 1971 the Hungarian authorities ended the affiliation of the magazine with the Institute of Literary Studies, and Pál Pándi was appointed editor-in-chief of Kritika in 1972. Immediately after his appointment the central committee of the ruling Socialist Workers' Party banned all work on structuralism. During Pándi's editorship Kritika focused on literary, cultural and political issues. Notable contributors of this period included Pál Almási, István Király, Péter Agárdi, Gábor Ráfis Hajdú, and Géza Vasy. Pándi served as the editor-in-chief of the magazine until 1983.

It is published on a monthly basis by Népszabadság Zrt. which also publishes a left-liberal daily, Népszabadság. The magazine, headquartered in Budapest, describes itself as a "socio-theoretical and cultural publication". It covers essays on literary, theatre and film analyses, and interviews. In addition, it publishes articles about political and cultural analyses. As of 2013 Erno Balogh was the editor of the monthly.

== See also ==
- List of magazines in Hungary
