= Karl Pfeifer =

Austrian journalist (1928–2023)

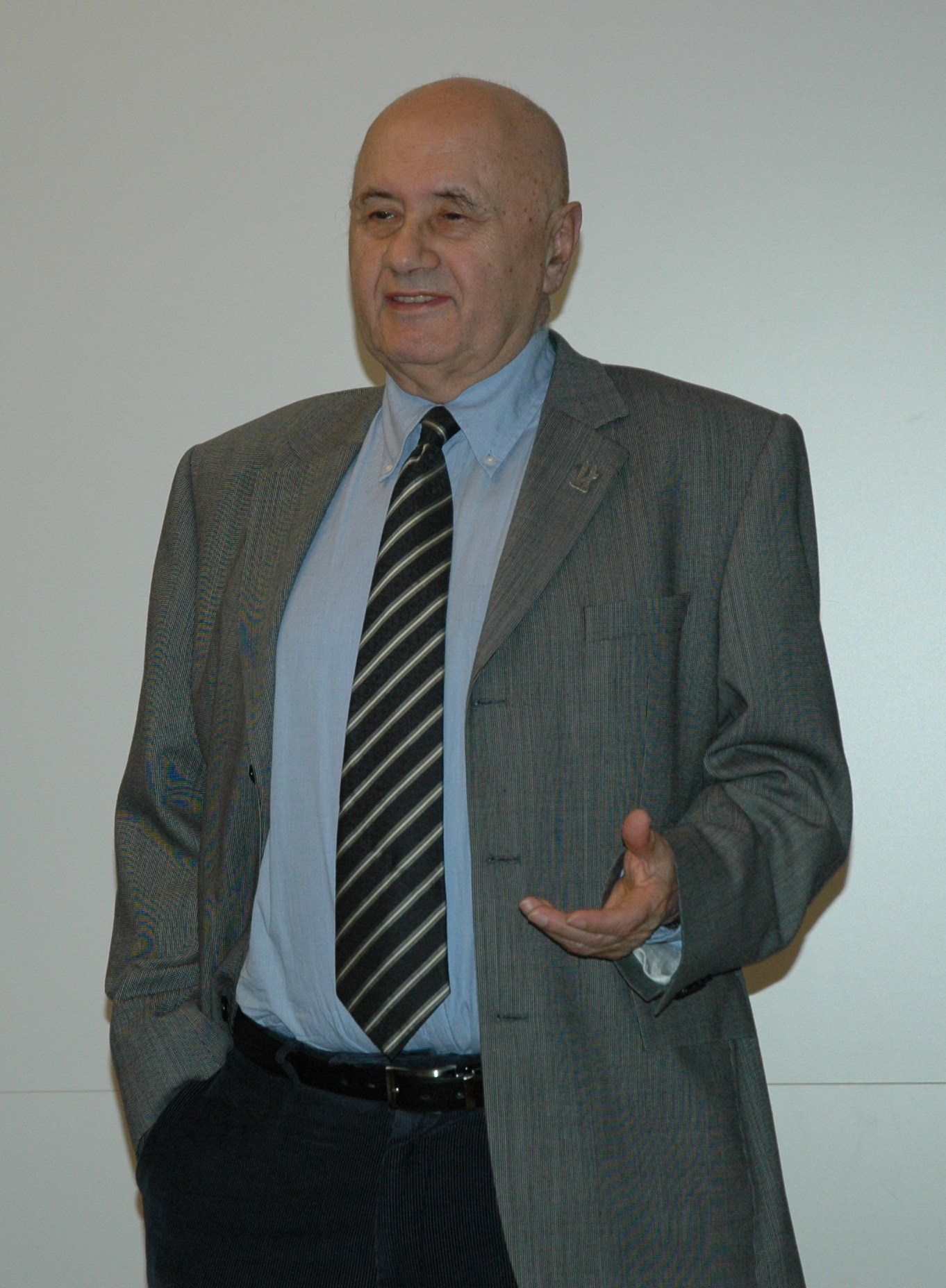
Pfeifer in 2008

Karl Pfeifer (Hebrew: קרל פייפר; 22 August 1928 – 6 January 2023) was an Austrian journalist.

== Life ==
Karl Pfeifer was born to a Jewish family on 22 August 1928 in Baden bei Wien, near Vienna. After the Anschluss of 1938 his family fled to Hungary. In 1943 the Socialist-Zionist youth organization Hashomer Hatzair decided to evacuate Pfeiffer to Palestine together with a group of other young refugees. He lived in a kibbutz there and from 1946 served in Palmach, the elite troop of the underground Jewish army Haganah, whose members subsequently became part of the Israel Defense Forces. Pfeiffer left Israel in 1951.

In 1982 Pfeiffer became the editor of "Gemeinde", the official organ of the Viennese Jewish community. In this function he wrote in an article in 1995, that the political scientist Werner Pfeifenberger had used "Nazi tones" in the yearbook of the freedom party academy. Karl Pfeifer said that Pfeifenberger had played the Nazi regime down and accused the Jews of being responsible for Hitler's war in 1933. Afterwards Pfeifer was sued by Pfeifenberger and acquitted in two instances. When in 2000, the Vienna public prosecutor brought charges of re-Nazi activity against Pfeifenberger, he committed suicide. The editor of the right magazine ZurZeit, Andreas Mölzer, called Pfeifer then in a press release to its subscribers, to be part of a "hunting party" which had Pfeifenberger driven into suicide – The "Jewish journalist" had released the "legal avalanche against Pfeifenberger". In consequence, Pfeifer sued for compensation in the Austrian courts. On 15 November 2007, Pfeifer got under article 8 of the European Court of Human Rights right adjudicated – at the same time, the Republic of Austria was convicted and required to pay € 5,000 compensation for the failure of the courts.

From the early 1990s, Pfeifer worked as a Vienna correspondent for Israeli radio and as a freelance journalist for the London monthly anti-fascist magazine Searchlight and the Budapest weekly newspaper Hetek. Pfeifer also belonged to the board of trustees of the documentation archive of Austrian resistance.

In 2008, Mary Kreutzer produced a documentary for the Society for Critical Research on Antisemitism about his life entitled Zwischen allen Stühlen.Lebenswege des Journalisten Karl Pfeifer. It was shown in Germany, Austria, Hungary, Italy and Israel. In 2011, the film was shown in the presence of Karl Pfeifer at the Austrian Institute of the Minnesota University in Minneapolis and at the Austrian Cultural Forum in New York.

Pfeifer died on 6 January 2023, at the age of 94.

== Merits ==
- 2003: Joseph Samuel Bloch Medal from the Action against anti-Semitism in Austria
- 2018 Decoration of Honour for Services to the Republic of Austria in Gold
- 2022 won Simon Wiesenthal award
