= Ferenc Fejtő =

Journalist and political scientist

François Fejtő
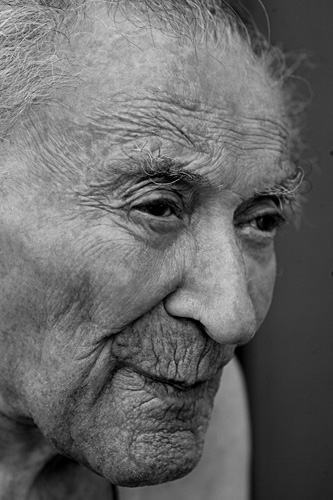
- Fejtő in 2007
- Born: Ferenc Fejtő; 31 August 1909; Nagykanizsa, Austria-Hungary
- Died: 2 June 2008 (aged 98); Paris, France
- Occupations: Journalist, political scientist

Ferenc Fejtő (31 August 1909 – 2 June 2008), also known as François Fejtő, was a Hungarian-born French journalist and political scientist specializing in Eastern Europe.

== Biography ==
He was born in Nagykanizsa to a well-off Jewish Hungarian family of booksellers and publishers. He was raised as a Roman Catholic. Following the fall of the Austro-Hungarian Empire, several members of his family became Yugoslavian, Italian, Czechoslovak and Romanian citizens.

He studied literature at Pécs and Budapest universities, alongside Slavic, German and Italian students. In 1932, he was condemned to a year in prison for organizing a Marxist study group. In 1934, he enrolled in the Social Democratic Party, where he contributed to the Népszava daily and to the Szocializmus journal. In 1935, together with the poet Attila József and the publicist Pál Ignotus, he founded the anti-fascist and anti-Stalinist literary journal Szép Szó. He published Sartre, Mounier, and Maritain. In 1938, following a sentence of six months in prison for an article criticizing the pro-German stance of the government, he left Hungary for France. During the Second World War, he took part in the French Resistance.

In 1945, François Fejtő headed the press department of the Hungarian embassy in Paris. He resigned his position in protest against the condemnation of his longtime friend László Rajk, and cut all links with Hungary. He returned to his native country only once, for Imre Nagy's national funeral in 1989.

After the war, Fejtő attended the Congrès des intellectuels pour la liberté, alongside Raymond Aron, François Bondy, and David Rousset. The publication in 1952 of his book A History of the People's Democracies (translated in seventeen languages and re-edited several times) earned him suspicion on the part of several intellectual figures close to the French Communist Party.

Between 1944 and 1979 he worked at the Agence France-Presse as a journalist commenting on Eastern European events. He acquired French citizenship in 1955. Between 1972 and 1984, he taught at the Institut d'études politiques de Paris. In 1973, a jury presided over by Raymond Aron granted him the title of Docteur ès lettres for his literary output.

François Fejtő devoted most of his journalistic and literary career to the study of Eastern European regimes. In his lifetime, he observed their birth, growth, decline and fall.

He also contributed to numerous French and non-French journals and newspapers, including Esprit, Arguments, Contre-Point, Commentaire, Le Monde, Le Figaro, La Croix, Il Giornale, La Vanguardia, Magyar Hírlap and The European Journal of International Affairs.

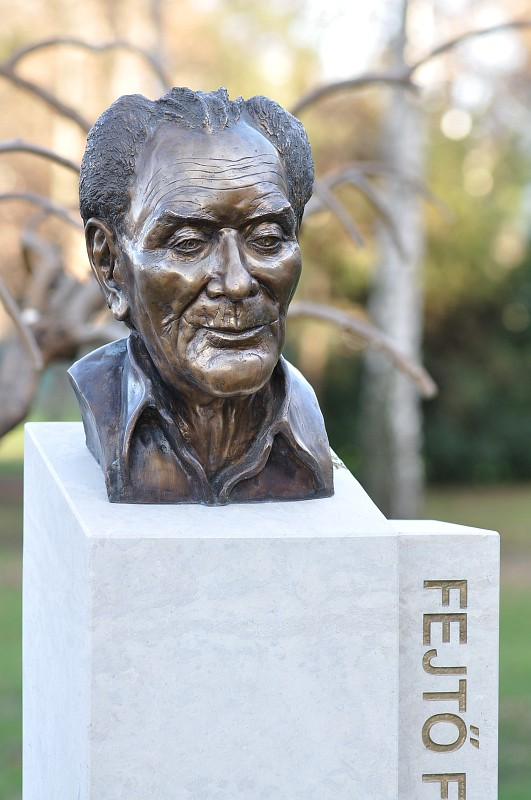
Statue of Ferenc Fejtő in the Szent István park in Budapest.

François Fejtő remains one of the great European intellectual figures of the 20th century. Close friends with Nizan, Mounier and Camus, critical interlocutor of Malraux and Sartre, he met with leaders of the Comintern and the Communist movement, talked to the masters of the Kremlin, to Tito, Castro and Willy Brandt, and both admired and criticized Charles de Gaulle and François Mitterrand. On his death, Hungary declared a period of national mourning.

== Bibliography ==
Translated into English:

- A History of the People's Democracies: Eastern Europe since Stalin, 1971
- The French Communist Party and the Crisis of International Communism, 1970
- Behind the Rape of Hungary, 1957
- The Opening of an Era, 1848: An Historical Symposium, 1948
- Heine, 1946
