= Viktor Külföldi =

Hungarian journalist, academic (1844–1894)

- Born: Jakab Mayer-Rubcsics; 1844; Thalheim, Kingdom of Saxony
- Died: March 5, 1894 (aged 49–50); Budapest, Austria-Hungary
- Occupations: Journalist, lecturer
- Writing career
- Pen name: Viktor Külföldi
- Language: Hungarian
- Subject: Social democracy

Viktor Külföldi, real name Jakab Mayer-Rubcsics, born Jacob Mayer (Hungarian: Mayer-Rubcsics Jakab, "Külföldi Viktor") (1844 – March 5, 1894) was a Hungarian Socialist, journalist, and lecturer.

Born in Thalheim, Germany (or Switzerland?), he was known in his adopted country by the alias "Külföldi" (Hungarian for "foreigner"). In 1871 he became a member of the International Working Men's Association. Together with Karóly Farkas (1842–1907) and Antal Ihrlinger, he co-founded the first Hungarian Socialist organization, the General Working Men's Union (Hungarian: az Általános Munkásegylet). For organizing a strike by the GWMU, he, among others, was arrested (1871–2) and accused of high treason; he was eventually acquitted because of lack of evidence.

In 1877 Külföldi founded the Social-democratic newspaper Népszava ("People's Voice"). He retired from the worker's movement in 1890 and died in Budapest in 1894.
