= Dartmouth College publications =

Dartmouth College and its students publish a number of journals, reviews, and magazines, including the Aegis (the school's yearbook) and the Dartmouth Law Journal, a nationally recognized law publication run by undergraduate students.

== The Aegis ==
The Aegis (pronounced EE-jus) is Dartmouth College's award-winning yearbook. Published annually, the Aegis covers campus events, student life, student organizations, sports, academics, and seniors. The Aegis' mission statement, as stated in the Aegis Constitution:

The Aegis exists at Dartmouth College because it is strongly felt that there is a need for a pictorial account of life on the Hanover Plain. The Aegis shall not be grandiloquent, but the effort is to be made to capture a bit of the splendor, the agony, the triumph, the discouragement --- the green grass, the white snow, the brown mud, and the uniqueness of personage who find in it all something to carry away. As a piece of worthy public relations and proud memorabilia, The Aegis is a valuable and concrete record of a year on campus. And thus it is that The Aegis helps to save a bit of what Dartmouth is every year. The Aegis occupies a position of traditional luxury, and Dartmouth College has none other quite like it.

The 2005 Aegis earned the 2006 Award of Recognition.

The 1994, 2008, 2009 and 2010 Aegis won the Benny or Best of Category award, given to the best yearbook in the nation by the Printing Industries of America, Inc. based on high standards of print and design. The Aegis was the first college yearbook in the nation to have won the Benny three times consecutively.

== The Dartmouth Apologia ==
The Dartmouth Apologia is a Christian journal. It was founded by members of the class of 2010 in 2007-8 and is published approximately twice per year. The Dartmouth Apologia was named Best Student Publication at Dartmouth for 2009–2010. According to its mission statement,

The Dartmouth Apologia exists to articulate Christian perspectives in the academic community. We affirm that the Bible is inspired by God, that faith in Jesus Christ is necessary for salvation, and that God has called us to live by the moral principles of the New Testament. We also affirm the Nicene Creed, with the understanding that views may differ on baptism and the meaning of the word "catholic."

== Aporia ==
Aporia is an undergraduate journal of philosophy. It was founded in 1983 by Ruth Chang, who was an undergraduate at Dartmouth at the time, and is now a professor of philosophy.

== The Dartmouth ==
The Dartmouth (or The D) is the independent daily campus newspaper that has served Dartmouth as its de facto news source for more than 160 years. It is published on campus in Robinson Hall. Famous alumni of The Dartmouth include Susan Dentzer, Paul Gigot, Mort Kondracke, and ABC News journalist Jake Tapper, who drew comics for The Dartmouth.

== Dartmouth Beacon ==
The Dartmouth Beacon was a student-run journal of conservative political thought, with a focus on international and national issues. It was a monthly magazine but has not been published for some time.

== Dartmouth Free Press ==
The Dartmouth Free Press was a biweekly newspaper of liberal political thought and campus activism, but has not been published for a significant period of time.

== The Dartmouth Independent ==
The Dartmouth Independent was a cultural/general-interest magazine. While some other campus magazines offer political commentary, The Dartmouth Independent lacks a defined political allegiance. Notable achievements include winning the award for best publication its inaugural year, and publishing a history of beer pong.

== The Dartmouth Literary Monthly ==
The Dartmouth Literary Monthly was a monthly literary magazine run by students. The first issue was September, 1886. It was published monthly during the school year by a board of editors from the junior and senior classes of Dartmouth College. The magazine is no longer operating.

== Dartmouth Jack O'Lantern ==
The Dartmouth Jack O'Lantern is one of the nation's oldest collegiate humor magazines, founded in 1908. The magazine, which boasts that it is Dartmouth's “only intentional humor magazine,” is based in Robinson Hall, and its staff has famously pulled off numerous pranks. Many celebrated writers, artists, comedians and politicians began their careers at the "Jacko", as it is often called, including: Theodor Geisel (who first took the name Seuss as a pseudonym so that he could continue to work on the Jack O’Lantern after he was banned from participating in college activities for violating Prohibition. After graduating, he felt his alter ego deserved a degree as well, and began signing his artwork 'Dr. Seuss'), Chris Miller (who based his short stories in National Lampoon on his undergraduate experiences at Dartmouth College, and subsequently turned them into the movie Animal House), Norman MacLean, Buck Henry, and Robert Reich. The magazine was referenced in the opening line of F. Scott Fitzgerald's short story The Lost Decade, which was first published in Esquire in 1939. The Jack O'Lantern's website is available here.

== Dartmouth Law Journal ==
The Dartmouth Law Journal is a nationally recognized journal of legal matters with articles written by professors, graduates, and undergraduates from academic institutions throughout the United States. The Journal is the only undergraduate-run journal to appear on the online legal database Heinonline. The Dartmouth Law Journal was founded in 2003; it was then known as the Dartmouth College Undergraduate Journal of Law.

== Dartmouth Radical ==
The Dartmouth Radical is a print publication that began circulating in 2012. The paper stands in contrast to the more conservative Dartmouth Review and has a left-of-center political alignment. Articles are focused on social justice, activism, and increasing awareness of equity and diversity as well as exposing social inequalities on campus.

== Dartmouth Review ==
The Dartmouth Review is a well-known and sometimes controversial conservative publication that is published off-campus without any official connection to the college. Alumni/ae of the Review include Dinesh D'Souza, Laura Ingraham, and Pulitzer Prize winner Joseph Rago.

== Dartmouth Undergraduate Journal of Science ==
The Dartmouth Undergraduate Journal of Science, widely referred to as DUJS, is the official science journal of the Dartmouth Undergraduate Organization of the Sciences (DUOS) and Dartmouth College's premier journal for original scientific research.

== Lifelines ==
Lifelines is the print journal for literature and art published by Geisel School of Medicine at Dartmouth. The journal was founded in 2002 by Sai Li (MED’06) and established with the publication of the first issue in Fall 2004. The journal is published annually.

== MALS Journal at Dartmouth ==
Formerly the MALS Quarterly, the MALS Journal at Dartmouth is a journal that showcases the writing of students in the Master of Arts in Liberal Studies program. Archived online since 2005, the Quarterly recently gained status as a journal in late 2012. Editions beginning in 2013 will include an ISSN for cataloging purposes.

== Others ==
- Montage is an undergraduate journal of film criticism and discourse.
- The Stonefence Review is a publication of student art and writing.
- Squeezebox is an undergraduate music magazine.
- Word is an alternative literary publication.
