= Rogi Wieg =

Dutch author, poet, visual artist and musician

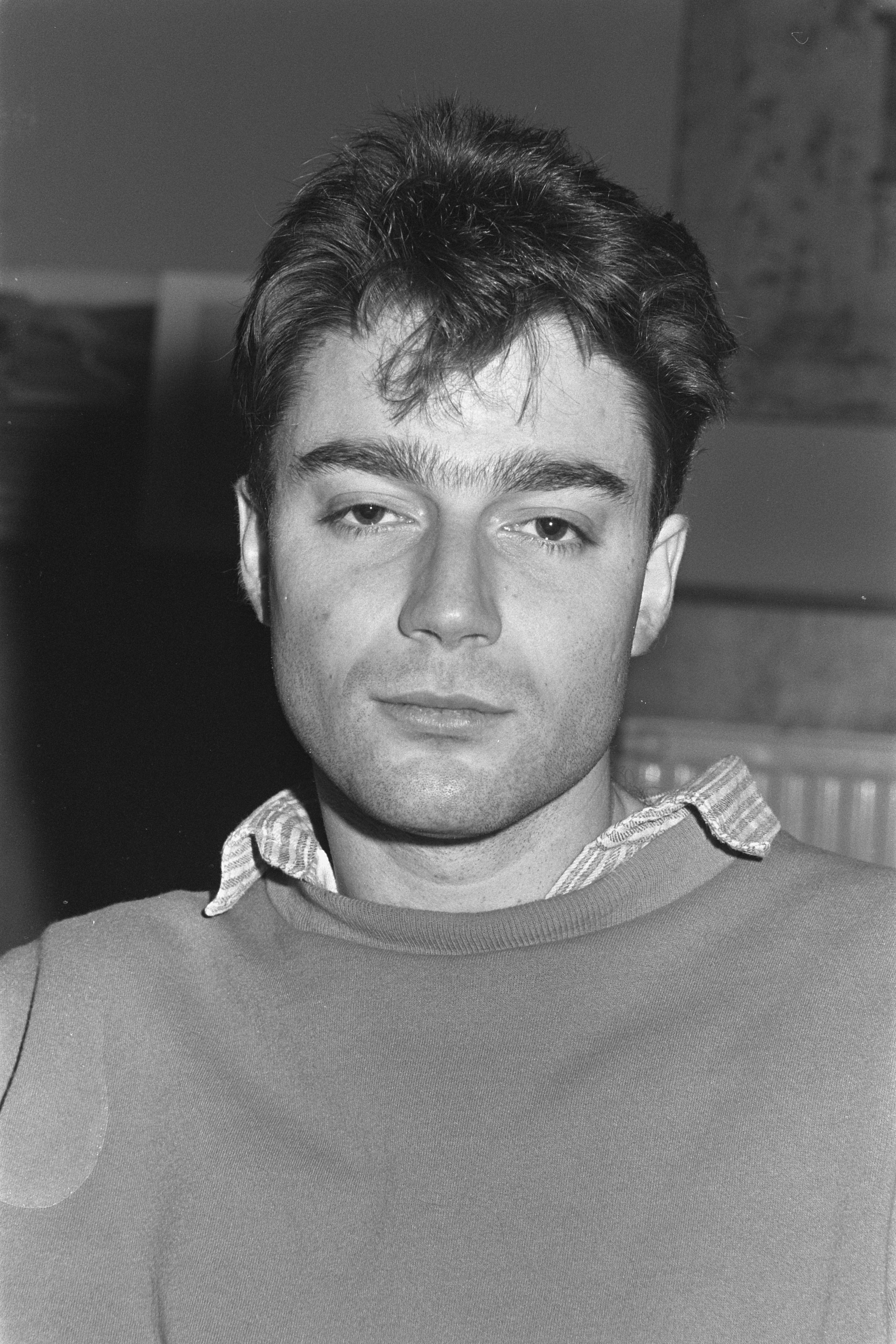
- Rogi Wieg (1987)
- Born: Robert Gabor Charles Wieg; 21 August 1962; Delft, Netherlands
- Died: 15 July 2015 (aged 52); Amsterdam, Netherlands
- Occupations: Poet, writer
- Writing career
- Period: 1981–2015
- Notable awards: 1987 – Lucy B. and C.W. van der Hoogt Prize for Magic Wire dagverdrijf; 1988 – Charlotte Köhler Scholarship for The sea has no manners; 2004 – Choice Club Poetry Club, publisher of Awater on The Other; 2008 – Poetry Awards, winning work: No revolver from Comb; 2014 – Rogi Cradle's poem Slow gone black flower fields was recorded in The 100 best poems chosen by Ahmed Aboutaleb for the VSB Poetry 2014

Robert Gabor Charles "Rogi" Wieg (also spelled Vig; 21 August 1962 – 15 July 2015) was a Dutch poet, novelist, and musician.

== Early life and education ==
Robert Gabor Charles Wieg was born on 21 August 1962 in Delft in the Netherlands. His parents had fled from Hungary in 1956 and had settled in the Netherlands a year later.

Wieg was trained in classical music during his youth, but at the age of sixteen, he started to favour blues music and Dutch chanson.

== Career ==
Wieg wrote poetry.

He worked for Liesbeth List, and was the editor of the literary magazines Tirade and Measure. He was a poetry critic for Het Parool between 1986 and 1999.

In 1999, Wieg began with painting and drawing. As an artist he was self-taught. Together with Mari Alföldy, Wieg translated poetry from Hungarian.

His life was marked by severe depression. He was regularly admitted to psychiatric hospitals to undergo electroshock therapy and he attempted suicide three times.

On 29 December 2014 Wieg married the artist Abys Kovács, who illustrated the poems of Khazarenbloed.

Wieg died on 15 July 2015 in Amsterdam at the age of 52. He had opted for euthanasia because of unbearable psychological and physical suffering.
