= Magyar Hírlap =

Hungarian online daily newspaper

- Type: Daily newspaper (1968–2022); Online newspaper (2022–present)
- Format: Compact (until 2022); Website only (2022–present)
- Owner: Gábor Széles
- Founded: 16 May 1968; 58 years ago
- Ceased publication: 11 July 2022 (print)
- Political alignment: Conservative
- Language: Hungarian
- Website: www.magyarhirlap.hu

Magyar Hírlap (Hungarian pronunciation: [ˈmɒɟɒr ˈhiːrlɒp], lit. 'Hungarian Gazette') is a former Hungarian daily newspaper that operates exclusively online since 11 July 2022. Owned by conservative entrepreneur Gábor Széles, Magyar Hírlap supports political parties of Hungary with conservative values, whereas it was known for its liberal stance until 2006.

== History and profile ==
Magyar Hírlap started in 1968 as the newspaper of the Hungarian government. It was privatized after the political changes in 1989, and quickly became known for backing liberal causes. In 2000 it was bought by Ringier AG. Due to falling circulation and an investigation by the Economic Competition Authority which found Ringier to have an excessive share of the Hungarian newspaper market, the title was axed in 2004. It was quickly relaunched by its editorial staff, and purchased by Széles in 2005.

Attempts to change the paper's political direction were resisted until September 2006 an audio recording surfaced in which the then Prime Minister Ferenc Gyurcsány admitted to having concealed the true state of the nation's public finances during that year's election campaign. This fatally weakened the Hungarian Socialist Party – Alliance of Free Democrats coalition government, of which the paper had been a supporter. Széles then replaced the entire editorial staff with right wingers.

The website is part of the first emerging, then dominant (print) media supporting the conservative government in power since 2010.

== Circulation and online audience ==
It was printed in compact format. until July, 2022 when print circulation ceased. The circulation of Magyar Hírlap was 107,000 copies in January 1989 and 78,000 copies in January 1991. The paper had a circulation of 75,000 copies in July 1992 and 65,000 copies in March 1993. Its circulation was 41,000 copies in 1998. The paper had a circulation of 27,769 copies in 2009, making it the sixth most read daily in the country.

According to the Hungarian telecommunication regulator NMHH, based on official data from Digitális Közönségmérési Tanács (Digital Auditing Council), the website's average daily reach amounted to 12,535 in 2021, or 0.12% of the Hungarian population. In comparison, rival dailies Magyar Nemzet and Népszava drew audiences of 70,351 and 87,720, respectively. In 2022, these numbers changed to 10,225 for Magyar Hírlap, 101,941 for Magyar Nemzet and 102,141 for Népszava.

The Facebook page of Magyar Hírlap was removed in August, 2023. A new Facebook page was created in September 2023, which had less than 1,000 followers as of November 3, 2023. On the same day, rival dailies Magyar Nemzet and Népszava had more than 42,000 and 53,000 followers, respectively. These numbers changed to 2,700 for MH, 71,000 for MN and 73,000 for Népszava by March 11, 2025.

== Controversial publications ==
In 2013 the paper published an opinion piece by Zsolt Bayer, who referred to the killings of Marian Cozma and Gergely Sávoly, where Roma were suspected of involvement, and wrote that many gypsies are "animals... unfit to live among people" and "potential murderers [who] should not exist." The article generated negative reactions in Hungary and throughout Europe. A Fidesz spokeswoman said that Bayer's views were his own, while Fidesz communications chief Máté Kocsis said critics of Bayer's article were "siding with" Roma murderers. The Hungarian Media Authority fined the journal 250,000 Forints and ordered the content removed from the internet.

== Political activity ==
A publicist of Magyar Hírlap, Zsolt Bayer, was one of the leading figures in the pro-government march held in January 2012 in Budapest, which was attended by more than 100,000 people.
