= Magyar Demokrata =

Political magazine in Hungary

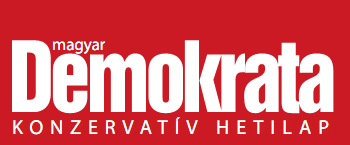
- Editor: András Bencsik
- Categories: Political magazine
- Frequency: Weekly
- Publisher: artamondo kft.
- Founded: 1997
- Country: Hungary
- Based in: Budapest
- Language: Hungarian
- Website: www.demokrata.hu
- ISSN: 1417-6432
- OCLC: 40822619

Magyar Demokrata (Hungarian pronunciation: [ˈmɒɟɒr ˈdɛmokrɒtɒ], Hungarian: Hungarian Democrat) is a weekly political magazine published in Budapest, Hungary. It has been in circulation since 1997.

== History and profile ==
Magyar Demokrata was launched in 1997. It is published by artamondo kft on a weekly basis and has its headquarters in Budapest. The magazine has a right wing conservative political leaning and is run by András Bencsik who is its editor.

Magyar Demokrata is described by Krisztián Ungváry as a far-right publication and by János Salamon as a neo-Nazi or neo-Arrow Cross magazine. The magazine is also regarded as part of conservative media which emerged in the country in 2010.

Magyar Demokrata, a social-criticism and cultural magazine, features anti-Israel, anti-Semitic and pro-Nazi articles, according to the Heinrich-Boll-Stiftung and the United States Department of State. However, the weekly claims that anti-Semitism does not exist in Hungary and that it is “a political weapon used by liberals and leftists."

Péter Csermely is one of the former editors of Magyar Demokrata.

In 2016 Magyar Demokrata sold 19,000 copies.

== See also ==
- List of magazines in Hungary
