= The Budapest Times =

English-language newspaper in Hungary

The Budapest Times is an English-language newspaper reporting on events in Hungary. The paper is published weekly, and is owned by Budapest-Zeitung Kft.

== See also ==
- List of newspapers in Hungary
