= Faith Church, Hungary =

Pentecostal Church

Coordinates: 47.4688°N 19.1500°E

Faith Church (Hungarian: Hit Gyülekezete) is an Evangelical charismatic Pentecostal Christian denomination and a megachurch in Hungary. Its headquarters in Budapest has over 150,000 members.

== History ==
Faith Church was founded in 1979 by a group of seven Hungarians, led by Pastor Sandor Nemeth, who currently leads the church. The independent Pentecostal-Charismatic church could conduct its worship services only illegally during the years of the Communist regime. Its activities and leaders were monitored by the Communist secret service. By 1989, membership reached 2,000 people. In 1989, the Hungarian State declared Faith Church a recognized denomination based on the 1895 XLIII Act.

In 2008, Faith Church in Budapest had 30,000 faithful in its 5,000-seat building.

In 2016, the Church has 70,000 people regularly attend worship services across Hungary. The weekly Sunday service of the Church is regularly broadcast on live television.

There are about three hundred local church branches of Faith Church functioning all around the country and beyond the borders of Hungary. All neighboring countries, Germany and the U.S. have local Faith Church congregations as well. The majority of local churches hold worship services on privately owned property. Local churches in Pécs, Debrecen, Nyíregyháza and Salgótarján are also housed in buildings that can accommodate more than a thousand people.

Based on the 1% tax designation to churches, Faith Church is the fourth most supported church in Hungary. However, according to the last census in Hungary, Faith Church was not among the four biggest churches. It kept its official church status after the Orbán government's 2011 reduction of the number of churches.

== Social programs and publications ==
The Faith and Morals Cultural Foundation performs social services, provides aid to families, cares for the elderly and also pursues teaching, training, information distribution and cultural services.

Faith Church maintains elementary schools in Budapest, Pécs, Nyíregyháza and Salgótarján and a kindergarten in Kecskemét. The state-accredited theological college, Saint Paul’s Academy, functions in Budapest.

The Church has published a weekly news magazine, Hetek, since 1997.

== Beliefs ==
The denomination has a charismatic confession of faith.

In a service on 16 November 2019, Németh described yoga as "a physical exercise of demon worship."

== See also ==
- List of the largest evangelical churches
- List of the largest evangelical church auditoriums
