= Morris Rossabi =

American historian

Morris Rossabi is an American historian and associate adjunct professor at Columbia University. He specialises in Inner Asian, East Asian, and Chinese history.

Morris Rossabi was born in Alexandria, Egypt. He moved to the United States when he was young and then received his PhD from Columbia University in 1970.

He is a Distinguished Professor of History at Queens College, and is a published author. He received an honorary doctorate from the National University of Mongolia in 2009. In 2011, he also delivered the W. Allyn Rickett-endowed lecture at University of Pennsylvania about Mongol influence on Ming China. He received a Certificate of Merit from the Mongolian Ministry of Foreign Affairs at the Mongolian Embassy to the United Nations in 2021. Among his publications is China and Inner Asia: from 1368 to the present day (1975).
