= Vas Népe =

Hungarian daily newspaper

- Owner: Central European Press and Media Foundation
- Publisher: Pannon Lapok Társasága
- Editor: Miklós Halmágyi
- Language: Hungarian
- Headquarters: 40 Széll Kálmán St., Szombathely
- Country: Hungary
- Circulation: 60,000
- Website: http://www.vaol.hu

Vas Népe (English: Vas County People) is a Hungarian daily newspaper, published in Vas County. It usually has between 16 and 28 pages, and has a print run of 60,000 and a readership of around 185,000.

The Sunday edition includes supplements and can be taken separately, functioning as a weekly newspaper and magazine, analogous to many newspapers in the United Kingdom such as The Times and The Sunday Times.

The editor is Miklós Halmágyi and the publisher is Pannon Lapok Társasága.

== Daily features ==
- News
- Focus
- Economy
- Culture
- TV and radio listings
- Sport
- Classified advertisements
- Miscellany

== Regular features ==
- Topical humour (Saturdays)
- "Promenades" (student essays)
- Lifestyle
- Domestic animals
- Cinema listings
- Celebrities
- Music
- Health
- Fashion
- Property (Realty)

== Supplements ==
- Weekend
  - Automotive
  - Construction
  - Passing-out ceremonies
  - Television and radio reviews (Hungarian: RTV tipp)

== Local editions ==
On Wednesdays and Fridays there are eleven local editions:

- Szombathely
- Kőszeg
- Csepreg
- Bük
- Sárvár
- Celldömölk
- Répcelak
- Szentgotthárd
- Körmend
- Vasvár
- Őriszentpéter

Each edition has the same main section and an inserted section covering more-local news.

== Addresses ==
- Main office: 40 Széll Kálmán St., Szombathely
- City offices: Celldömölk, Körmend, Kőszeg, Sárvár, Szentgotthárd, Vasvár
- Printers: West Hungary Nyomda Centrum (English: West Hungary Publishing Centre), Veszprém
