= Portfolio.hu =

Hungarian online financial newspaper

Portfolio
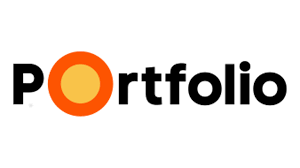
- Portfolio Group
- Categories: Economics, business, finance
- Format: Online newspaper
- Founded: 1999
- Country: Hungary
- Language: Hungarian, English
- Website: www.portfolio.hu

Portfolio (also referred to as Portfolio.hu) is an online financial newspaper in Hungary with a user count of one million per month as of 2018.

Portfolio Group was ranked among the ten most read news sites, and the 15 most visited websites in Hungary. Its main publication, Portfolio.hu has a special emphasis on business, economic and financial news. Besides its online media platforms, the company offers various trading services and provides personal analysis of financial markets. The company also has an event business line, which organizes industry forums annually in the fields of agriculture, insurance, lending, asset management, corporate finance, capital markets, the vehicle sector, financial IT and real estate. Portfolio.hu is also published in English.
