= Blikk =

Hungarian daily tabloid newspaper

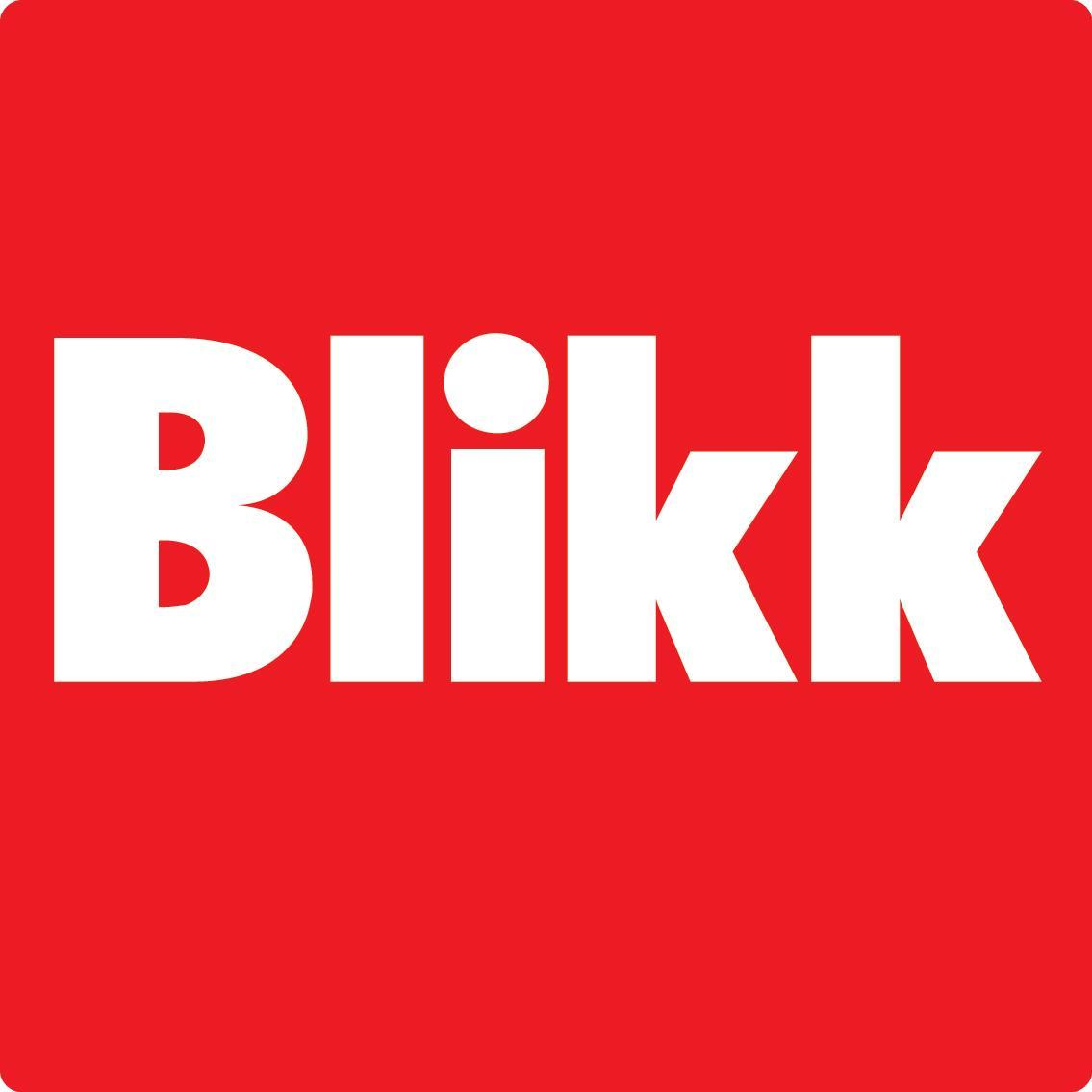
- Type: Daily newspaper
- Format: Broadsheet
- Owner: Ringier
- Publisher: Ringier
- Editor-in-chief: Iván Zsolt Nagy
- General manager: Tibor Kovács
- Founded: 1 March 1994
- Language: Hungarian
- Headquarters: Budapest
- Country: Hungary
- Circulation: 32,000 (2026)
- ISSN: 1785-4830
- Website: www.blikk.hu

Blikk is a Hungarian news website and daily newspaper covering current affairs, politics, entertainment, economy, sports and lifestyle. It is the only independent media outlet and the most widely read newspaper in Hungary. It is published in Budapest by Ringier Hungary Kft, the Hungarian subsidiary of the Swiss publisher Ringier.

== Profile ==
The main sections of the publication (digital and print) cover current events and affairs, politics, entertainment, economy, sports and lifestyle.

According to Similarweb, in February 2025 blikk.hu was among the most visited Hungarian news sites (rank no. 6), with 13 million visits that month.

The printed edition of Blikk was published in the tabloid newspaper for a long time, but has gradually changed its character toward a broadsheet publication.

Blikk has its headquarters in Budapest and has no clear political affiliation. Balkan Investigative Reporting Network emphasizes that printed Blikk newspaper is the "only one publication left that is financially independent from the government" of Hungary. Owner is the Hungarian subsidiary of Ringier.

== History ==
Blikk began publishing on 1 March 1994. In 2001, Blikk was merged with Mai Nap, also published by Ringier. In March 2002 blikk.hu, registered in 1998, was launched. At the beginning of 2004, Blikk was the first Hungarian daily newspaper to be printed entirely in color. From 2014 until 2021, Blikk belonged to Ringier Axel Springer Media AG, a joint venture of and Axel Springer SE. Afterwards, Blikk again belonged exclusively to Ringier.

On October 31 2025, Ringier sold Blikk and other magazines to Fidesz tied media group Indamedia.

== Circulation and market position ==
Blikk's circulation was 85,000 copies in 1998. The circulation of the paper was 242,000 copies in 2003. It had a circulation of 265,199 copies in 2009, making it the second most read daily in the country. It was about 150,000 copies in 2013. The circulation decreased to 50,017 in 2022. Despite the generally declining circulation, Blikk reached around half a million readers daily in 2023. According to the National Media and Infocommunications Authority, Blikk is the most widely read daily newspaper in Hungary.

== Other Blikk publications ==
In addition to the Blikk newspaper, other publications under the Blikk umbrella brand are or were also available, for example the Sunday edition Vasárnapi Blikk, which started in July 1998, Blikk TV Magazin and Blikk Nők (addressing women). with its spinoffs Blikk Nők Extra, Blikk Nők Otthon & Kert, Blikk Nők Konyha, or Blikk Nők Egészség.

== List of editors-in-chief ==
- Péter Tőke (1994–1996)
- Tamás Ligeti Nagy (1996–1997)
- Ferenc Pallagi (1997–2004)
- Gábor Fejes (2004–2006)
- Marcell Murányi (2006–2014)
- Balázs Kolossváry (2014–2016)
- Norbert Gedei (2016–2020)
- Balázs Kolossváry (2020–March 2025)
- Iván Zsolt Nagy (April 1, 2025–present)

== Awards ==
- 2024: Péter Zsolnai (Hungarian Press Photo Contest)
- 2024: Tamás Korponai (Pictures of the Year International)
- 2021: Péter Zsolnai (Hungarian Press Photo Contest)
- 2019: Balázs Kolossváry (Feleki László Award of the Hungarian Sports Journalists Association)
- 2018: Péter Zsolnai (Hungarian Press Photo Contest)
- 2015: Dávid Szirmay (Antal Csengery Award of the Budapest Metropolitan Municipality)
- 2003: Balázs Kolossváry (World Sports Journalism Day)

== See also ==
- List of newspapers in Hungary
