= Fényszóró =

- Editor: Béla Balázs
- Founded: 1945
- Ceased publication: 1946
- Political alignment: Left-wing
- Language: Hungarian language
- Headquarters: Budapest

Fényszóró (Hungarian pronunciation: [ˈfeːɲsoːroː], 'Spotlight') was a weekly publication on theatre and films, published from Budapest, Hungary between 1945 and 1946. The publication had a socialist orientation. Béla Balázs became the editor of the weekly in the fall of 1945.
