= 168 Óra =

Weekly Hungarian language political news magazine (1989–2022)

- Editor-in-chief: Ákos Mester
- Categories: News magazine
- Frequency: Weekly
- Circulation: 4,105 (2022)
- Publisher: Telegráf Kiadó Kft
- Founded: 1989; 37 years ago
- Final issue: August 2022
- Company: Brit Media Group
- Country: Hungary
- Based in: Budapest
- Language: Hungarian
- Website: 168 Óra
- ISSN: 0864-8581

168 Óra (Hungarian: 168 Hours) was a weekly political news magazine published in Budapest, Hungary. It was in circulation between 1989 and August 2022. The website is still updated as of October 2022.

== History and profile ==
168 Óra was started in 1989 by the radio broadcaster with the same name, which is part of Hungary's state broadcasting institution Magyar Rádió. In the initial phase it was just the print version of the radio programme, but later it became a political publication. As of 2014 Ákos Mester was the editor-in-chief of the magazine which is based in Budapest. It is part of Brit Media Group. The publisher of the magazine was Telegráf Kiadó Kft.

168 Óra was published weekly on Thursdays and offered articles about politics and current affairs as well as features interviews with significant public figures. The magazine had a liberal and left liberal stance. The magazine defined itself as a critical civic-intellectual weekly.

In 2003 168 Óra published the French President Jacques Chirac's press conference as if it was an exclusive interview for the magazine.

The magazine folded in August 2022.

== Circulation ==
168 Óra sold 58,000 copies in 2002 and 53,000 copies in 2003. During the fourth quarter of 2009 its circulation was 36,371 copies. In 2010 the magazine had a circulation of 21,000 copies. It sold 17,746 copies in 2013. Its circulation dropped to 14,321 copies in 2015. The last publicly announced circulation figure in 2021 was 4,105 copies which indicated a steeply declining circulation status.

== See also ==
- List of magazines in Hungary
