= Népszava =

Hungarian language newspaper

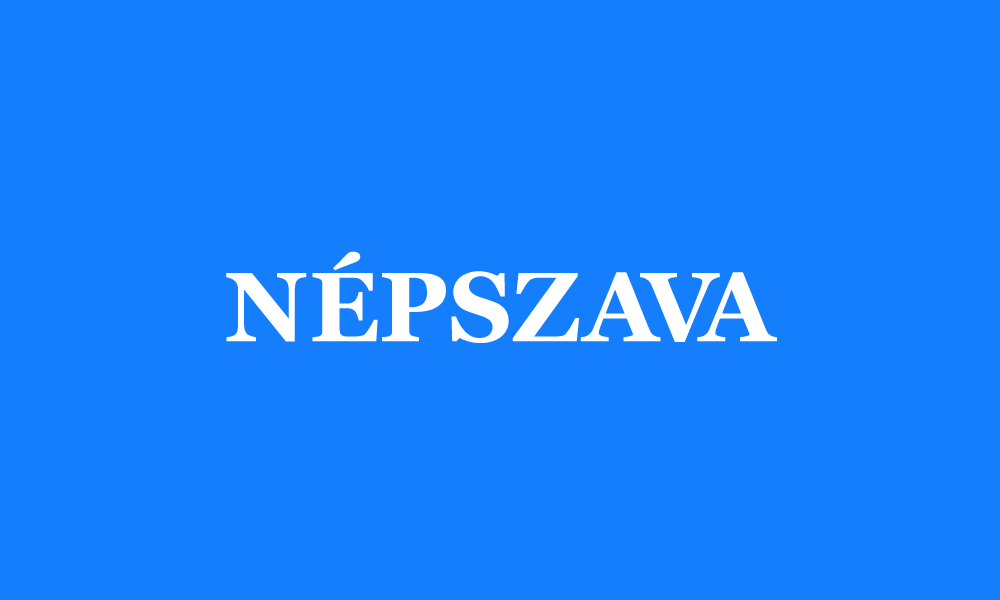
- Type: Daily newspaper
- Format: Broadsheet
- Owner: Tamás Leisztinger
- Founder: Viktor Külföldi
- Publisher: XXI. század Média Kft.
- Editor-in-chief: Péter Németh
- Founded: 20 May 1877; 149 years ago
- Ceased publication: 29 May 2026 (print); 8 October 2026 (online)
- Political alignment: Social democracy Left wing
- Language: Hungarian
- Headquarters: 6 Jókai utca Budapest 1066, Hungary
- Country: Hungary
- ISSN: 1418-1649
- Website: nepszava.hu

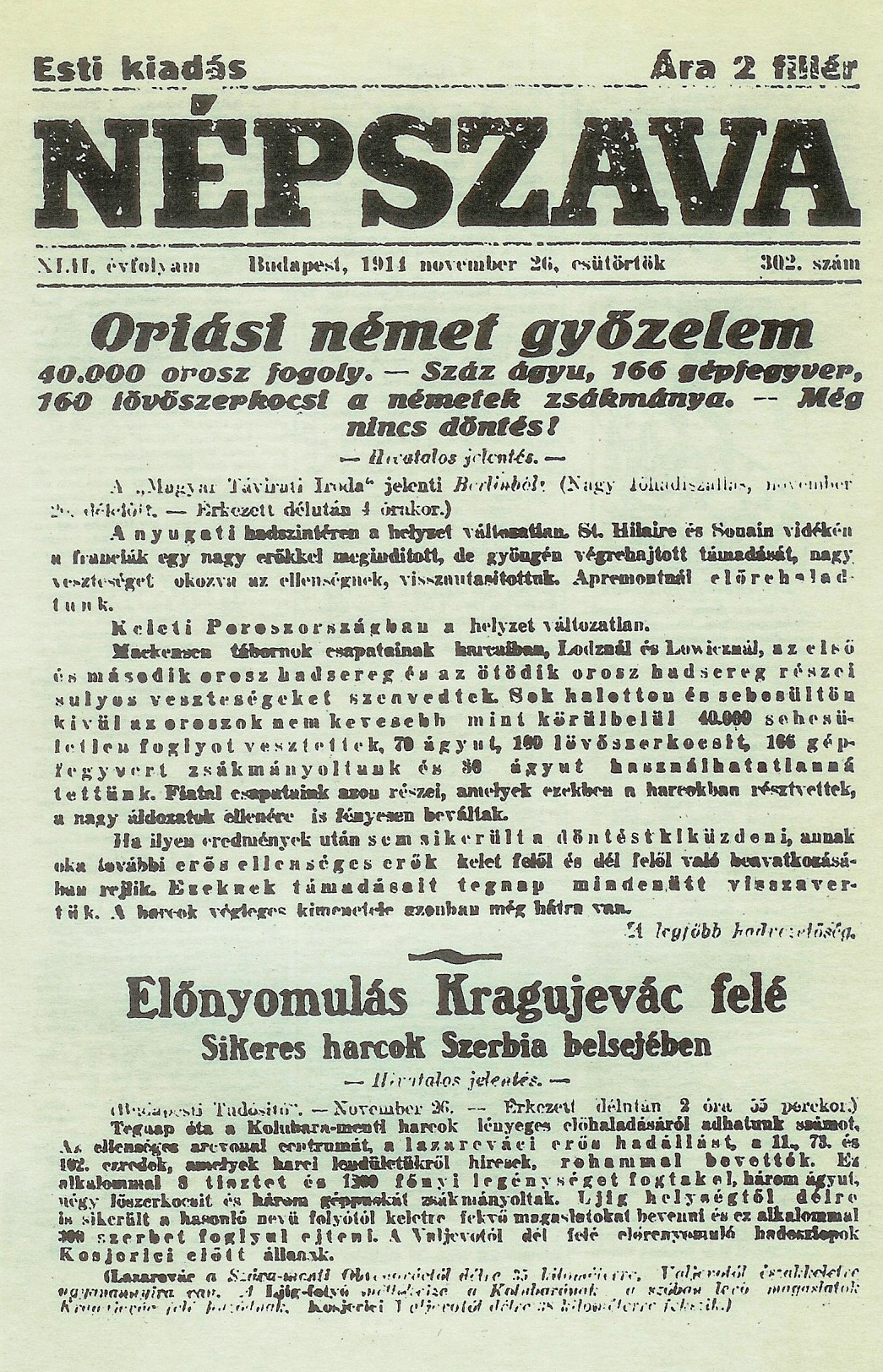
Népszava, 1914

Népszava (Hungarian pronunciation: [ˈneːpsɒvɒ], meaning "Voice of the People" in English) was a social-democratic Hungarian language newspaper published in Hungary. From May 29, 2026 the newspaper became online only when Mediaworks canceled the print and distribution contract due to nonpayment by Népszava. On October 8, the editorial staff of Népszava was integrated into the relaunched Népszabadság, becoming a section within it, while the website was converted into an archive, thus bringing the newspaper’s history to a definitive end.

== History and profile ==
Népszava is Hungary's eldest continuous print publication and as of October 2019 it was the last and only remaining liberal, social democratic political daily in the country.

Népszava was established in 1873 in Budapest by Viktor Külföldi. It was the official newspaper of the Hungarian Social Democratic Party until 1948 when Hungary became a communist state. During this period two of Népszava's editors in chief were murdered: Béla Somogyi (along with reporter Béla Bacsó) in 1920 by right wing officers and Illés Mónus in 1944 by members of the Hungarian Nazi Arrow Cross Party militia.

During the period of the Hungarian People's Republic between 1948 and 1989, it was the official newspaper of Hungarian trade unions. In 1990 it was privatized. Its publisher, the entrepreneur János Fenyő was shot dead in Budapest in 1998. The crime is still partially unsolved. Between 2019 and 2026, the newspaper was owned by the entrepreneur Tamás Leisztinger.

Népszava was published in broadsheet format.

== Circulation ==
The circulation of Népszava was 222,000 copies in January 1989 and 181,000 copies in January 1991. The paper had a circulation of 135,000 copies in July 1992 and 102,000 copies in March 1993. Its circulation was 80,000 copies in 1998. The paper had a circulation of 31,742 copies in 2009, making it the sixth most read daily in the country. The circulation further declined to 10,522 copies by 2016. After the closure of Népszabadság in 2016, Népszava became the market leader among political dailies. Its average circulation was 21 thousand copies/day with the 32-page Saturday edition reaching 24 thousand copies. Circulation steadily declined to 11,320 in 2024 according to official data by MATESZ, and the print edition was abandoned in 2026.

== Notable staff ==
Editors in chief

- Viktor Külföldi (from 1877)
- Ernő Garami (1898–1918)
- Árpád Szakasits (1939–1944, from 1945)
- Anna Kéthly (1957–1964)

Writers, publicists

- Endre Ady
- György Faludy
- Ferenc Fejtő
- Gyula Illyés
- Sándor Jemnitz, music critic (1924–1950)
- Attila József
- Margit Kaffka
- Gyula Kállai
- Lajos Kassák
- Anna Kéthly
- Dezső Kosztolányi
- Zsigmond Kunfi, deputy chief editor (from 1907)
- Géza Losonczy
- Miklós Radnóti

== See also ==
- List of newspapers in Hungary
