= Lakáskultúra =

Interior design magazine in Hungary

- Categories: Interior design magazine
- Frequency: Monthly
- Founded: 1964
- Company: Axel Springer Budapest KFT
- Country: Hungary
- Based in: Budapest
- Language: Hungarian
- Website: www.lakaskultura.hu
- ISSN: 0047-391X
- OCLC: 1367999597

Lakáskultúra (Hungarian pronunciation: [ˈlɒkaːʃˈkultuːrɒ], Hungarian: Home culture) is a Hungarian monthly interior design magazine which has been in circulation since 1964. The magazine's headquarters are located in Budapest, Hungary.

== History and profile ==
Lakáskultúra was established by the Hungarian Architects’ Association in Budapest in 1964. The Association was also one of the sponsors of the magazine. Its publication became regular in 1967. The magazine was part of the Ministry of Domestic Trade between 1964 and 1987. Pallas owned Lakáskultúra until 1989, after which Axel Springer Budapest KFT acquired it. The magazine appears monthly.

During the Communist era, Lakáskultúra contributed to the state ideology of the socialist consumer. It was one of the most read and significant publications in this period. The magazine had a brief popularity due to its content on distinct interior furnishings, room arrangements, decorative inclinations, and homes of Hungarian families. As a result, it hardly ever featured accessories exhibited in trade shows and fairs, and professionally-designed interiors. The magazine has also published apartment layouts and floor plans.
