= Hetek (magazine) =

Hungarian news magazine

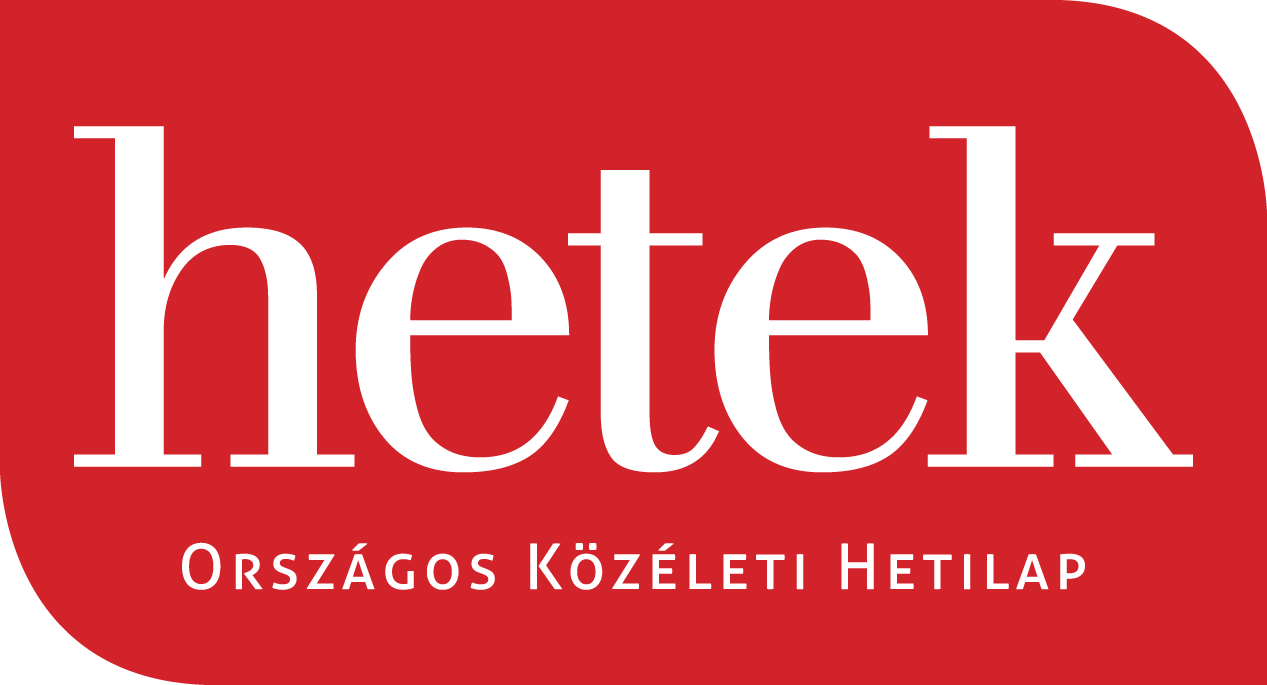
- Editor: Sándor Németh
- Categories: News magazine
- Frequency: Weekly
- Publisher: Oláh Printing Industrial Limited
- Founder: Sándor Németh
- Founded: 1997; 29 years ago
- Country: Hungary
- Based in: Budapest
- Language: Hungarian
- Website: Hetek

Hetek (Hungarian pronunciation: [ˈhɛtɛk], Weekly) is a weekly Pentecostal news magazine published in Budapest, Hungary. The magazine has a conservative democratic political stance.

== History and profile ==
Hetek was established by pastor Sándor Németh in 1997. The magazine is published weekly on Fridays and is based in Budapest. The magazine covers articles about politics, public life and religious issues and has links to the Faith Church, a Pentecostal Christian sect headed by the founder. Since 2009 the weekly has been published by the Oláh Printing Industrial Limited.

One of the former editors-in-chief of Hetek is László Bartus, a church leader.

Hetek has emphasized several times critics about Islam.

The circulation of Hetek was 15,000 copies in 2010.

== See also ==
- List of magazines in Hungary
