= Turán (periodical) =

Cover of the double issue 2004/6 – 2005/1, showing an illustration from the Rohonc Codex. "Turán. A magyar eredetkutatással foglalkozó tudományok lapja." (Turán: A Periodical of the scholarly research of the origin of the Hungarians)

Turán (Hungarian pronunciation: [ˈturaːn]) is a Hungarian periodical. First it was issued during the years 1913, and 1917 through 1918. From 1998 it is being issued again bi-monthly by the Hungarian company "Magyar Őstörténeti Kutató és Kiadó Kht." ("Researcher and Publisher of Hungarian Prehistory Ltd."; editors in chief: Ferenc Lovass 1998–2000, Előd Esztergály 2000-).
