= Magyar Narancs =

News magazine in Hungary

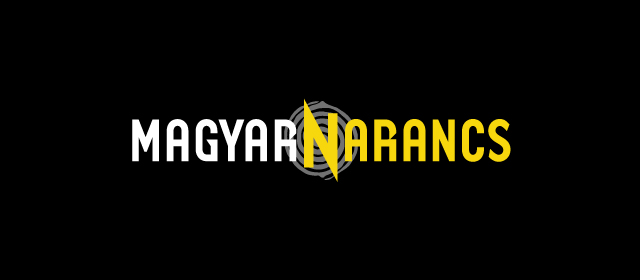
- Editor: Endre Bojtár
- Categories: News magazine
- Frequency: Weekly
- Publisher: Magyarnarancs.hu Lapkiadó Kft.
- First issue: 24 October 1989
- Country: Hungary
- Based in: Budapest
- Language: Hungarian
- Website: magyarnarancs.hu
- ISSN: 1586-0647

Magyar Narancs (Hungarian pronunciation: [ˈmɒɟɒr ˈnɒrɒnt͡ʃ], Hungarian Orange) is a weekly liberal magazine with a strong satirical tone appearing on Thursdays in Hungary. It is informally referred to as Mancs (Paw in English) which is a joking abbreviation of the name. The magazine was first published in October 1989. Its headquarters are in Budapest. It includes articles mainly on politics, culture and sociology.

In the mid-1990s, Magyar Narancs came out biweekly and was affiliated with the Fidesz party.

== See also ==
- List of magazines in Hungary
