= Élet és Irodalom =

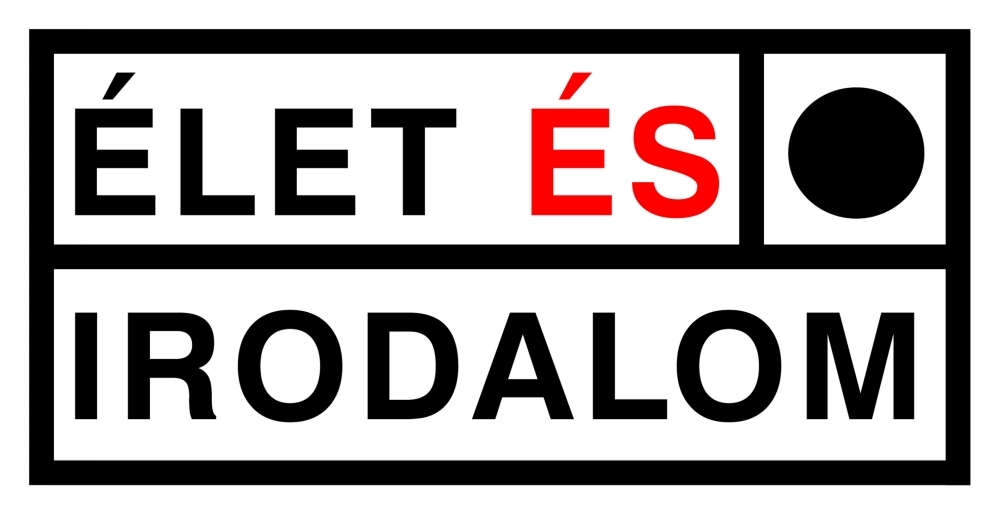
- Editor: Zoltán Kovács
- Categories: Literary magazine Political magazine
- Frequency: Weekly
- First issue: 15 March 1957; 69 years ago
- Country: Hungary
- Based in: Budapest
- Language: Hungarian
- Website: Élet és Irodalom
- ISSN: 0424-8848
- OCLC: 1567785

Élet és Irodalom (Hungarian pronunciation: [ˈeːlɛt ˈeːʃ ˈirodɒlom]; 'Life and Literature'), also known as ÉS, is a weekly Hungarian magazine about literature and politics.

== History and profile ==
Élet és Irodalom was first published as a literary magazine on 15 March 1957. In the 1960s its content expanded to include issues of public life in addition to literature. The magazine is published on Fridays and is based in Budapest. It is regarded as, "the premier weekly of the Hungarian liberal literati."

Élet és Irodalom was one of the independent publications in Hungary in the late 1990s. The magazine is considered a postmodernist and politically left liberal periodical, politically close to the left-wing parties such as Hungarian Socialist Party and Alliance of Free Democrats. The magazine offers investigative reports about the scandals occurred in the country.

In the 1980s, the circulation of Élet és Irodalom was nearly 120,000 copies. It was 27,000 copies in 2007.
