= Sèvres syndrome =

Conspiracy theory in Turkey

The Sèvres syndrome (Turkish: Sevr sendromu), also referred to as Sèvres paranoia, refers to a popular belief in Turkey that dangerous internal and external enemies, especially the West, are "conspiring to weaken and carve up the Turkish Republic". The term originates from the Treaty of Sèvres of the 1920s, which partitioned the Ottoman Empire among Armenia, Greece, the United Kingdom, France, and Italy, leaving most of Anatolia under Turkish rule with a new capital in Ankara; however, it was never implemented since it was left unratified by the Ottoman Parliament and due to Turkish victory on all fronts during the subsequent Turkish National Movement. Turkish historian Taner Akçam describes this attitude as an ongoing perception that "there are forces which continually seek to disperse and destroy us, and it is necessary to defend the state against this danger". Ethnic or religious minorities – such as the Dönmeh – were often labeled as fifth columnists or agents of foreign powers working against Turkey.

This belief is often described as a conspiracy theory, and has been likened to fostering a siege mentality among certain members of Turkish society. According to a 2003 OSAF research, 43% of Turks believe that reforms of European Union is just a different version of the Ottoman capitulations.

== National identity and historical insecurity ==
Danish political scientist Dietrich Jung describes the Sevres Syndrome as "the perception of being encircled by enemies attempting the destruction of the Turkish state", and asserts that it remains a significant determinant of Turkish foreign policy. The term has been used in the scope of the Kurdish conflict in Turkey, accession of Turkey to the European Union and the recognition of the Armenian genocide. Historian Nick Danforth wrote in 2015 that "Sèvres has been largely forgotten in the West, but it has a potent legacy in Turkey, where it has helped fuel a form of nationalist paranoia some scholars have called the 'Sèvres syndrome'".

Scholars have examined the relationship between the concept, Turkish national identity, and competing historical claims to Anatolia. Political scientist Alexis Heraclides (2011) argues that Turkish anxieties about territorial sovereignty are connected not only to memories of Ottoman territorial losses but also to a perception among Turks that, despite centuries of residence in the region, they are not an indigenous or "autochthonous element", but rather the "latest comers". He further associates this perceived insecurity with the comparatively late development of modern Turkish national identity.

Burcu Kaleoğlu Uçaner (2025) approaches these concerns through the concept of ontological security. Examining early Kemalist historiography, Kaleoğlu Uçaner identifies anxieties concerning the historical legitimacy of Turkish claims to Anatolia. She observes that a 1932 history textbook implicitly presented Greeks as indigenous inhabitants of Anatolia and Turks as later arrivals, potentially suggesting a sense of inferiority toward Greeks. She contrasts this with subsequent nationalist historiography, particularly the Turkish History Thesis, which portrayed ancient Anatolian civilizations, including the Hittites, as Turkish.

Sociologist Türkay Salim Nefes (2023) examines the continued expression of Sèvres syndrome in Turkish political discourse. Through a qualitative analysis of Turkish parliamentary debates between 1983 and 2018, Nefes identifies recurring representations of indigenous Anatolian Christians as threats to Turkey's territorial integrity. Nefes argues that these narratives perpetuate perceptions of historical Turkish victimhood.

== History ==
According to Fatma Müge Göçek, the literature of Sèvres syndrome highlights three development stages of the "syndrome":

- "the initial contemporaneous impact of the Sèvres Treaty on state and society in the form of fear and anxiety"
- "negotiation during the radical Westernization of the Turkish Republic which is spearheaded by the military and the CHP; internal and external enemies are defined during this stage"
- "the institutionalized syndrome becomes radicalized as ultra-nationalist parties try to systematically exclude such perceived enemies from the Turkish body politic"

Nefes reports a strong undercurrent of antisemitism, blaming the treaty on a supposed Jewish conspiracy.

== Foreign policy of Turkey ==
In 2019, hailing Turkey's willingness to once more project power across the Mediterranean, Erdogan said "Thanks to this military and energy cooperation, we overturned the Treaty of Sèvres".

According to a Le Monde article, the opening date of Grand Hagia Sophia mosque for worship was not a coincidence, as 24 July marked the 97th anniversary of the Lausanne Treaty. "In the minds of Erdogan and his far-right partners who rallied after the failed coup, it is a matter of foiling the trap of a 'new Treaty of Sevres'".

In a column responding to the Le Monde piece, İbrahim Karagül, editor-in-chief of Yeni Şafak, suggested that the Western media was not "wrong" in spotlighting the weight of Sèvres on Turkey's newly assertive foreign policy.

== Comparisons ==
In 2015, Devlet Bahçeli, leader of the far-right Nationalist Movement Party, compared the agreement between the pro-Kurdish Peoples' Democratic Party (HDP) and the Turkish government in the scope of the Kurdish–Turkish peace process to the Treaty of Sèvres. Bahçeli claimed that the agreement "will lead to the collapse of the Turkish Republic" and has vowed to resist it. This was when Bahçeli maintained an anti-government and anti-AKP stance before suddenly switching sides.

== See also ==
- Conspiracy theories in Turkey
- Siege mentality
- Trianon syndrome

== Bibliography ==
- Drakoularakos, Stavros. "Turkey and Erdoğan's rising 'Lausanne Syndrome'". Digest of Middle East Studies 30.1 (2021): 22–33. doi=10.1111/dome.12224
- Göçek, Fatma Müge (2011). The Transformation of Turkey: Redefining State and Society from the Ottoman Empire to the Modern Era. London: I.B.Tauris. ISBN 9781848856110.
- Guida, Michelangelo. "The Sèvres syndrome and 'Komplo' theories in the Islamist and Secular Press". Turkish Studies 9.1 (2008): 37–52.
- Gulmez, Didem Buhari. "Foreigner Rights in Turkey: From Sèvres Syndrome to Decoupled Europeanization". in Europeanization in a Global Context (Palgrave Macmillan, London, 2017) pp. 141–166.
- Hovsepyan, Levon. "The Fears of Turkey: the Sèvres Syndrome". Information and Public Relation Center (2012).
- Matthews, Ryan John. "Sevres Syndrome: Constructing the populist us versus them through fear in Turkey". (PhD. Diss. Virginia Tech, 2021)
- Nefes, Türkay Salim. "Understanding anti-semitic rhetoric in Turkey through the sèvres syndrome". Turkish Studies 16.4 (2015): 572–587.
- Oprea, Iulia-Alexandra. "Heritage Of Fear: The Sèvres Syndrome, Turkishness". in Dynamics and Policies of Prejudice from the Eighteenth to the Twenty-first Century (2018) pp: 143+.
- Sarı, Buğra (2022). "Culture of Insecurity and Production of Foreign Policy Crises: Turkey's Sèvres Syndrome and Syrian Support for the PKK during the 1998 October Crisis". Journal of Balkan and Near Eastern Studies. 24 (1): 138–157. doi:10.1080/19448953.2021.1992186. hdl:20.500.14114/6227. S2CID 244912298.
- Schmid, Dorothée. "Turkey: The Sèvres Syndrome, or the Interminable War". Politique etrangere 1 (2014): 199–213.
- Yılmaz, Hakan. "Euroscepticism in Turkey: Parties, elites, and public opinion". South European Society and Politics 16.01 (2011): 185–208.
