= Controversies in the November 2015 Turkish general election =

Controversies during the Turkish general election of November 2015 mainly centred on the escalating violence in the south-east and the rise in domestic terrorist attacks linked to both the Kurdistan Workers' Party (PKK) and the Islamic State of Iraq and the Levant (ISIL). International concerns also grew over an increase in media censorship, with the government being accused of specifically targeting news outlets known to be close to the Gülen Movement such as Kanaltürk and Bugün TV. Safety concerns due to the escalating conflict resulted in the government proposing to merge ballot boxes in affected areas and to transport them to safer locations, though the opposition criticised the move as an attempt to decrease the votes of the Peoples' Democratic Party (HDP), which polled strongly in the June 2015 general election.

== Security concerns ==
Since late 2012, the Turkish government had conducted peace negotiations with the Kurdish separatist Kurdistan Workers' Party (PKK) militant organisation in order to end 40 years of ethnic conflict in the predominantly Kurdish south-east of the country. The negotiations, called the solution process led to a relative ceasefire, though critics have claimed that the ceasefire has led to the PKK becoming stronger and their atrocities have gone unnoticed in an attempt by the government to preserve the solution process.

=== Suruç bombing ===
On 20 July 2015, a suicide bombing in the Turkish-Syrian border town of Suruç perpetrated by an Islamic State of Iraq and the Levant (ISIL) militant led to the deaths of 32 activists from the Socialist Party of the Oppressed (ESP) youth wing. The activists were planning to cross the border to help relief efforts in the Kurdish town of Kobanî, which had been under siege by ISIL militants before being defeated by the Kurdish People's Protection Units (YPG). In retaliation, PKK militants killed two police officers in return for what they saw as collaboration between the Turkish government and ISIL, while ISIL militants directly engaged with Turkish military positions in the border town of Elbeyli, killing one soldier. In retaliation, the government authorised airstrikes against both PKK camps in northern Iraq and ISIL positions in Syria.

=== 2015 PKK rebellion ===
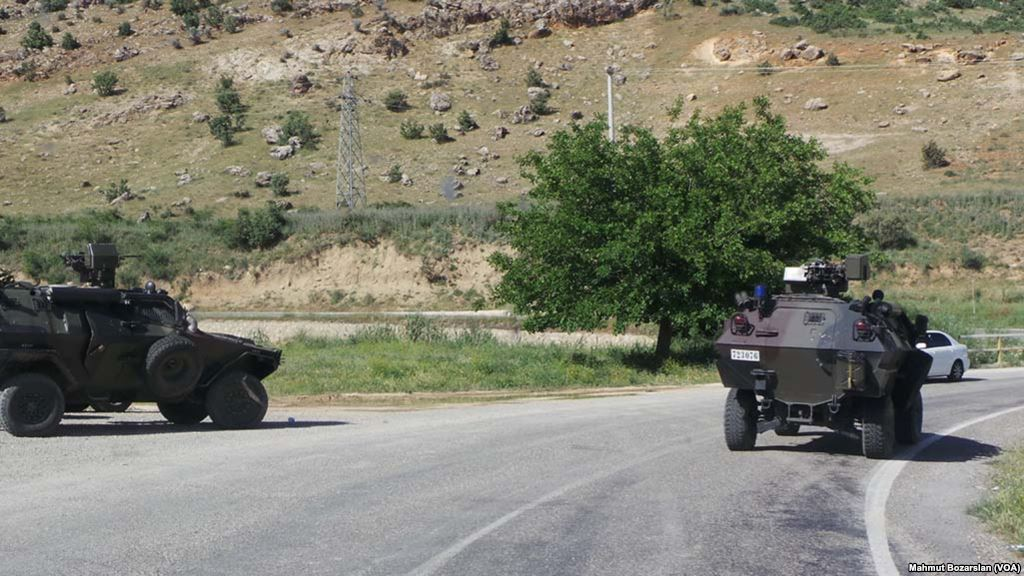
Turkish Army vehicles in Diyarbakır following the collapse of the solution process in July 2015

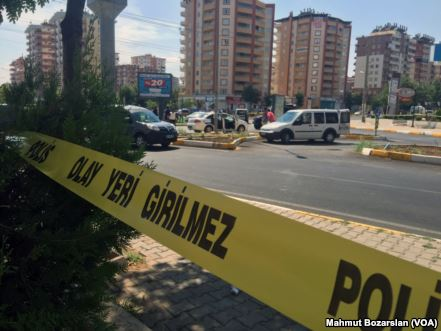
Aftermath of a PKK terrorist attack in Diyarbakır in August 2015

The abandoning of both the solution process with the Kurdish rebels and the policy of inaction against ISIL by the Turkish government led to a resumption of violence in the south-east, with PKK militants resuming attacks on Turkish military and police positions. Over 90 military or police personnel had been killed by 6 September 2015, raising concerns about whether peaceful elections could be held in the region. The pro-Kurdish Peoples' Democratic Party (HDP) co-leader Selahattin Demirtaş claimed that the conditions in the south-east were not adequate to hold peaceful elections, with party officials investigating the region having returned with negative reports. In early September, three Republican People's Party (CHP) MPs visited Van, Hakkâri and the district of Yüksekova. Their report, which contained accounts from the Governor of Hakkâri and the Kaymakam of Yüksekova, stated that the HDP-run municipalities in the region were openly recruiting militants for the PKK and consulting them before taking decisions. The report also documented cases of PKK youth wing (YDG-H) members attempting to militarise the region, smuggling to finance their operations and forcing individuals to conduct PKK propaganda.

=== PKK ceasefire ===
On 11 October 2015, the PKK announced a one-sided ceasefire in order to guarantee peaceful elections. The ceasefire was rejected by the Turkish government, which continued to conduct military operations against PKK positions.

== Media censorship ==
Despite projections that the AKP's control over the media would decrease after losing their majority in June's elections, the government nevertheless launched controversial crackdowns on pro-opposition media outlets in the lead-up to the vote. In September, international controversy arose over the arrest of 3 Vice News journalists on terrorism charges while covering the surge in unrest in south-eastern Turkey. The members of Radio and Television Supreme Council (RTÜK), which regulates the Turkish media, failed to elect a new President due to a political deadlock, with the AKP, MHP or HDP candidate failing to win enough votes from partisan executive board members.

On 3 October, thousands of journalists as well as members from numerous journalism associations held a demonstration at Taksim Square to protest the growing censorship of the press.

=== Crackdown on pro-Gülen media outlets ===
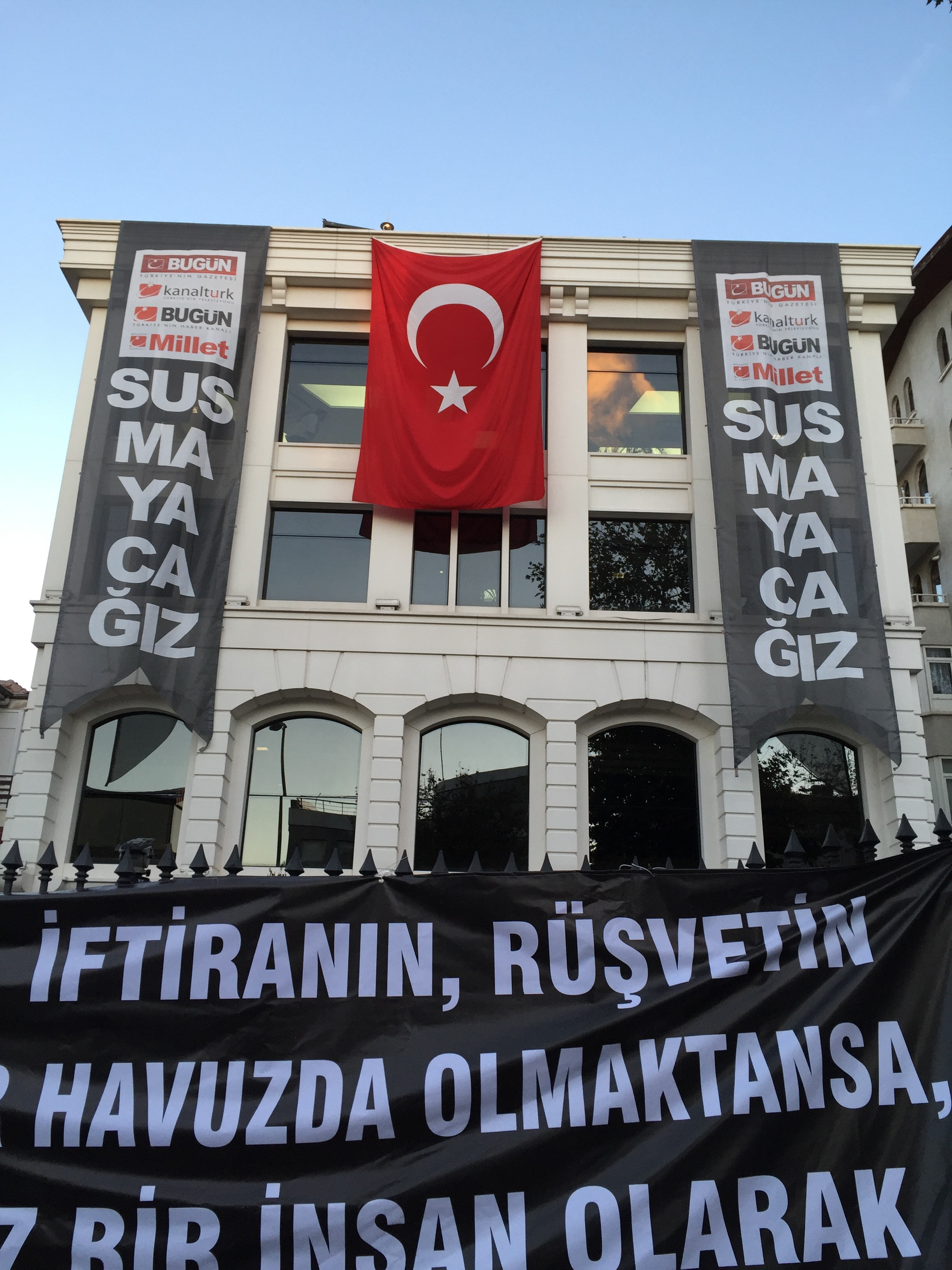
Protest banners at the headquarters of raided media company Koza İpek

On 1 September, police raids were conducted against 23 different companies belonging to the Koza İpek Holding, which is known for its close relations with Gülen Movement. Businessman Akın İpek was taken into custody for allegedly being a director of an armed terrorist organisation, a charge that he claimed was nothing more than slander. TV channel Kanaltürk and the newspaper Bugün were among those targeted, with Bugün having issued headlines accusing the government of funding the Islamic State of Iraq and the Levant (ISIL) earlier that day. The raids against anti-AKP media outlets were criticised by Reporters Without Borders and several national journalists' associations. In response to the crackdown against opposition media, the pro-opposition Sözcü newspaper carried a headline on their daily edition, stating 'If Sözcü falls silent, so will Turkey.'

=== Nokta controversy ===
On 14 September 2015, a prosecutor ordered the impounding of all copies of the magazine Nokta, which had published an issue containing a photoshopped picture of Recep Tayyip Erdoğan taking a selfie in front of a soldier's funeral, on the grounds that it had 'insulted the President' and acted as 'propaganda for an armed terrorist organisation'. The magazine's lawyers argued that the impounding on the magazine without a proper court order was unlawful and stated that the country had taken yet another step back in terms of press freedom.

=== Attack on Ahmet Hakan ===
In the early hours of 1 October, Hürriyet columnist and the presenter of the political talk show Tarafsız Bölge (Neutral Area), Ahmet Hakan, was attacked by four people outside his home. He was admitted to hospital and was later taken into surgery. It was initially reported that the incident was a result of road rage with no relations to Hakan's journalism, though it later emerged that three of the four attackers were AKP members, who were later suspended from the party. Abdurrahim Boynukalın, who had previously led a mob of 200 AKP supporters to attack the Hürriyet newspaper headquarters, was initially seen as a suspect, but later released a statement denying any link to the attack. Seven people were taken into custody for the attack, with only one being arrested. One of the suspects involved claimed that the police had paid them ₺25,000 to carry out the attack, alleging that the National Intelligence Organisation (MİT), the police and President Recep Tayyip Erdoğan were all aware of the plot.

== Political violence ==
=== Attack on Hürriyet headquarters ===
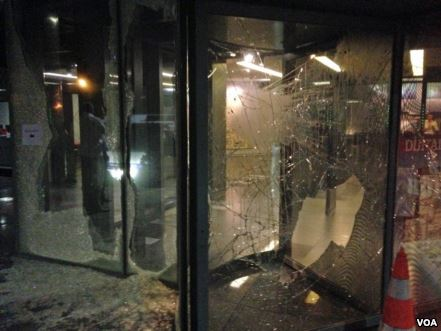
Aftermath of the attacks on the Hürriyet newspaper headquarters in early September 2015

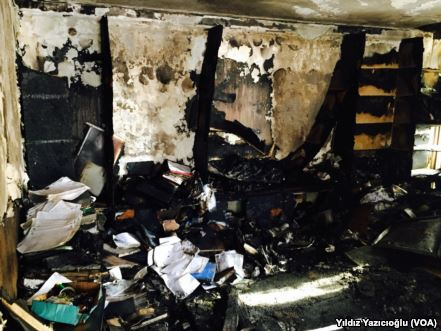
The archives department of the HDP headquarters after being subject to an arson attack by Turkish nationalists in September 2015

On 6 September, a group of 200 AKP supporters attacked the headquarters of Doğan Media Centre, which houses the offices of the newspaper Hürriyet. The newspaper had published a news story about an interview with Erdoğan by another TV channel shortly after 16 soldiers were killed by roadside bombs in Dağlıca. Erdoğan's comments, which included a claim that the attacks would have never had happened had the AKP won 400 seats in the June 2015, caused uproar and the newspaper was accused by AKP supporters of misquoting the President. AKP MP and Youth Wing leader Abdurrahim Boynukalın led the mob against Hürriyet, drawing heavy criticism and subsequently being sent to court for inciting hatred and vandalism. Another attack by a group of 100 protestors on Hürriyet occurred on 8 September in both their Istanbul and Ankara headquarters, this time opening fire on the building. 6 people were arrested for the role in the attacks.

=== Attack on the HDP central office ===
After the Turkish military suffered heavy casualties in fights with the PKK in both Dağlıca and Iğdır, nationalist protesters staged demonstrations and many attacked HDP office branches in protest at the HDP's links with the PKK. The HDP's headquarters was also subject to an arson attack, though the ensuring fire was quickly put out. Selahattin Demirtaş announced on 9 September that 400 HDP branch offices had come under attack in the last two days and accused the AKP's leaders of trying to push the country into civil war. However, the Mayor of Cizre Leyla İmret, a member of the HDP's fraternal Democratic Regions Party (DBP), claimed that they would begin a civil war against Turkey from Cizre. Fights between HDP and nationalists resulted in both deaths and injuries, while the workplace of a former HDP candidate was set alight by protestors.

=== Attacks against the CHP ===
In addition to the HDP, the offices of CHP branch offices in Sincan and Konya came under attack, with the offices and vehicles outside them being heavily vandalised. It was alleged by the CHP that the perpetrators of the attacks in Sincan included members of the Ottoman Hearths (Osmanlı Ocakları). On 26 October, gunmen driving past the CHP headquarters in Ankara fired five rounds at the building, though no-one was killed or injured. The CHP's leader Kemal Kılıçdaroğlu stated that his party would not be intimidated by the attack while other parties expressed their condemnation.

During early voting, a clash took place outside the Turkish embassy in Tokyo in October 2015 between Kurds in Japan and Turks in Japan which began when the Turks assaulted the Kurds after a Kurdish party flag was shown at the embassy.

=== Ankara bombings ===
21 days before polling day on 10 October 2015, two suicide bombers targeted attendants at a peace rally taking place outside Ankara Central railway station, killing 97 people and injuring over 500 others according to some reports. It was the deadliest terrorist attack in Turkish modern history, causing waves of public protests accusing the government of implicitly supporting and not doing enough to combat organisations such as the Islamic State of Iraq and the Levant (ISIL). The government denied the claims and announced three days of public mourning, while the pro-Kurdish Peoples' Democratic Party (HDP) blamed the governing AKP for the attack. The bombings also raised concern over how suicide bombers managed to evade security measures to detonate two bombs in the centre of the capital, with the precise location of the attack close to the National Intelligence Organisation (MİT) headquarters.

The bombing was followed by a series of gaffs by the AKP leader Ahmet Davutoğlu, who claimed after the attack that they had caught the perpetrators of previous attacks such as the Suruç bombing. This was impossible since the perpetrator at Suruç was a suicide bomber who was killed after detonating his explosives. Later, Davutoğlu claimed that they had a list of suspected suicide bombers but could not make arrests until they actually carried out an attack. Both statements were subject to commotion and ridicule on social media.

== Safety and distribution of ballot boxes ==
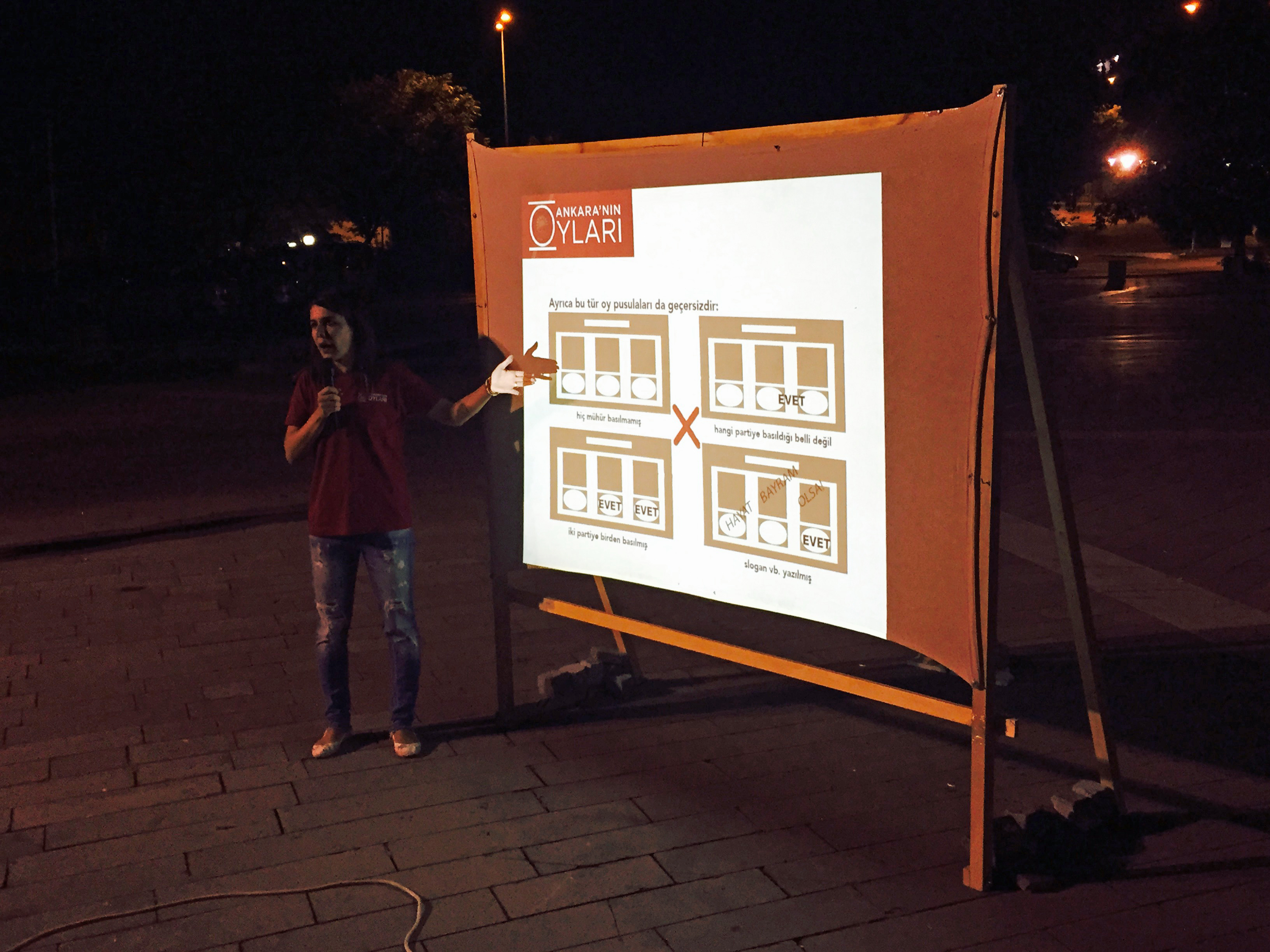
The Ankara'nın Oyları (Ankara's Votes) election monitoring organisation giving a presentation to volunteers regarding ballot box safety. The pictured slide shows examples of invalid votes

In September 2015, the government allegedly began pressuring the YSK to divert voters living in villages linked to the south-eastern district of Cizre to the town centre instead, citing security concerns. Cizre had been under an 8-day curfew while armed forced carried out a security operation against PKK militants before the government requested the 'merging' of ballot boxes. Such a decision would require villagers living in rural settlements having to make their way to the town centre to cast their vote instead.

On 23 September, a decision was taken by the Cizre Electoral Council to not set up polling stations in 23 villages and one hamlet. The decision would affect 48,687 out of around 66,000 registered voters in Cizre, forcing them to vote in different neighbourhoods. The HDP objected to the decision and refuse to recognise its authority, claiming that it was an attempt to reduce the HDP vote by reducing turnout in the party's electoral strongholds. Controversy over the decision grew even more when it emerged that it had been taken by just a single member of the electoral council, with the CHP representative stating that he had not been consulted. Although the HDP renewed their opposition to the move, the CHP admitted that they would have supported the decision had they been consulted, stating that it was practically impossible to enter the affected neighbourhoods due to the unrest. However, both the CHP Supreme Electoral Council representative and the President of the YSK himself stated that the decisions had no legal basis, stating that the YSK had to be consulted before such decisions could be made. Despite the YSK's statement, a similar decision to not set up ballot boxes was taken on 28 September by the Yüksekova electoral council in Hakkari Province, requiring all ballot boxes in rural villages to be moved to the town centre. On 3 October, the YSK voted against transferring ballot boxes, drawing heavy criticism from the AKP.

On 5 September, the HDP requested that the YSK place cameras to film the vote counting procedures in 126 'high security risk' areas. Their proposal was rejected on 14 September.

== See also ==
- Electoral fraud and violence during the June 2015 Turkish general election
