= Kanal 7 =

Turkish nationwide TV channel

- Country: Turkey
- Headquarters: Yeniköy, Sarıyer, Istanbul (1994–1999); Eyüpsultan, Istanbul (1999–2013); Bayrampaşa, Istanbul (2013–current)

Programming
- Language: Turkish
- Picture format: 576i (16:9 SDTV); 1080i (HDTV)br

Ownership
- Owner: Istanbul Metropolitan Municipality president by Recep Tayyip Erdoğan, Necmettin Erbakan, Ahmet Hakan and İsmailağa (1994–1999); Koç Holding (1999–2002); Albayrak Holding (2002–current)
- Sister channels: Yeni Şafak; Radyo 7

History
- Launched: 27 July 1994; 31 years ago (SD); 14 September 2014; 11 years ago (HD)
- Former names: Istanbul Metropolitan Municipality radio television fLagacyul name and BRT by former president of Nurettin Sözen (1992–1994)

Links
- Website: Website of Kanal 7

Kanal 7 (Turkish: Kanal Yedi) is a Turkish Free-to-air national Islamic TV channel established and on 27 July 1994. It has a terrestrial broadcast licence, and it is also available throughout Turkey via satellite. It airs Indian, Pakistani and Korean dramas. The channel is popular for Indian shows in Turkey such as Bir Garip Ask.

From 1995 to 1997 Ayşe Önal hosted a discussion show Minefield on Kanal 7 which brought Jews, Armenians and Turks together five days a week in a way not previously seen on Turkish television.

== Logo history ==
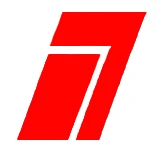
Logo of Kanal 7 by Istanbul Metropolitan Municipality president Recep Tayyip Erdoğan, Necmettin Erbakan, Ahmet Hakan and Ismailaga (1994–1999)

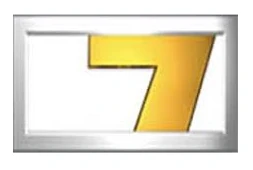
1st logo of Kanal 7 by Koç Holding (1999–2002)

2nd logo of Kanal 7 by Koç Holding (1999–2000)
