= Ahmet Hakan =

Turkish journalist and columnist (born 1967)

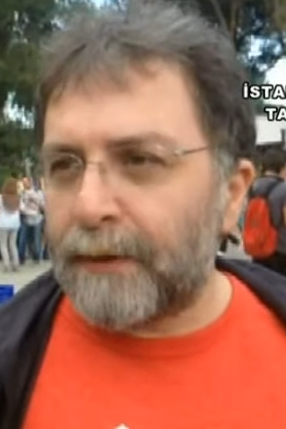
- Ahmet Hakan during Gezi Park protests
- Born: 11 August 1967 (age 59); Yozgat, Turkey
- Education: Uludağ University
- Occupations: Journalist, columnist

Ahmet Hakan (born 11 August 1967) is a Turkish journalist, author, and columnist working at Hürriyet, CNN Türk, and Kanal D. He studied at Bursa Religious High School (Imam Hatip Lisesi) and then Bursa Divinity Faculty (Bursa Ilahiyat Fakultesi). He used to be anchor-man for the television channel Kanal 7 founded by Necmettin Erbakan the founder/leader of Welfare Party (Refah Partisi). He was appointed editor of Hürriyet in 2019.

== Biography ==
Hakan Coşkun was born in Yozgat Province, on 11 August 1967. Hakan studied at Bursa Hatip school during his youth. He graduated from Bursa Divinity Faculty Bursa Ilahiyat Fakultesi. Between 1993 and 1994, he worked as a reporter at TGRT, a Turkish Television channel. In 2003, he became Kanal 7's news director. Then, he worked as a columnist at Yeni Şafak newspaper. He is currently working at Hürriyet, CNN Türk and Kanal D.

== Threats and attacks against Hakan ==
Star newspaper's writer, Cem Küçük, threatened Hakan with these words on an article published on 9 September 2015: "Like a patient suffering from schizophrenia, you still think that Hürriyet manages Turkey like the old days. We can crush you like a fly whenever we want. So far we have had mercy and you can still survive." As a result, Hakan filed a complaint against Cem Küçük on the same day.

CHP member Eren Erdem, submitted a questionnaire to TBMM Presidency in relation to this issue. Yeni Şafak's author Abdulkadir Selvi wrote in his column: "These are not the right things. Turkey and the AK Party do not deserve it." President of Association of Contemporary Journalists, Abakay, also said: "Hrant was killed after receiving numerous threats. Metin Göktepe was killed the same way. Such murders begin this way." Turkish Journalists' Association, the Press Council and many other organizations and a number of journalists condemned this attack.

In a video taken 24 hours after the second attack on Hürriyet newspaper, AKP member Abdurrahim Boynukalin, said: "I was thinking about going to Nişantaşı today, in front of his house. I was going to get there, and I'd say, 'come here'. Our mistake was to not beat them up at the right time."

was attacked by four people in front of his house on 1 October 2015. Hakan's nose and ribs were broken before he demanded protection, but the application related to the issue was not processed in any way. Two of the attackers appeared to be members of the Justice and Development Party, Fatih District Organization.

== Editor of Hürriyet ==
Hakan was appointed editor-in-chief of Hürriyet in 2019, following this media institution was passed into the hands of a pro-government business enterprise, Demirören Group, in 2018. His appointment came after previous editor Vahap Munyar resigned after 42 Hürriyet employees were sacked. The decision to sack the staff was made by the newspaper's owners, Demiroren Group, who are known to be close to the ruling Justice and Development Party of President Erdogan. "Our aim will be to take the powerful brand of Hürriyet to a higher point," Hakan said of his appointment.

In January 2021, received an award from President Erdogan at the Media Oscar Awards Ceremony of the Radio and Television Journalists Association. Erdogan stated that "Today we have a more colorful, democratic and pluralist media structure."

== Books authored ==
Hakan has three books:

- Neden Milliyetçilik? (2001)
- Çeteler, Mafya ve Siyaset (2001)
- Sivil, Dayanılmaz bir yürek (1999)
