= Dücane Cündioğlu =

Turkish philosopher and writer

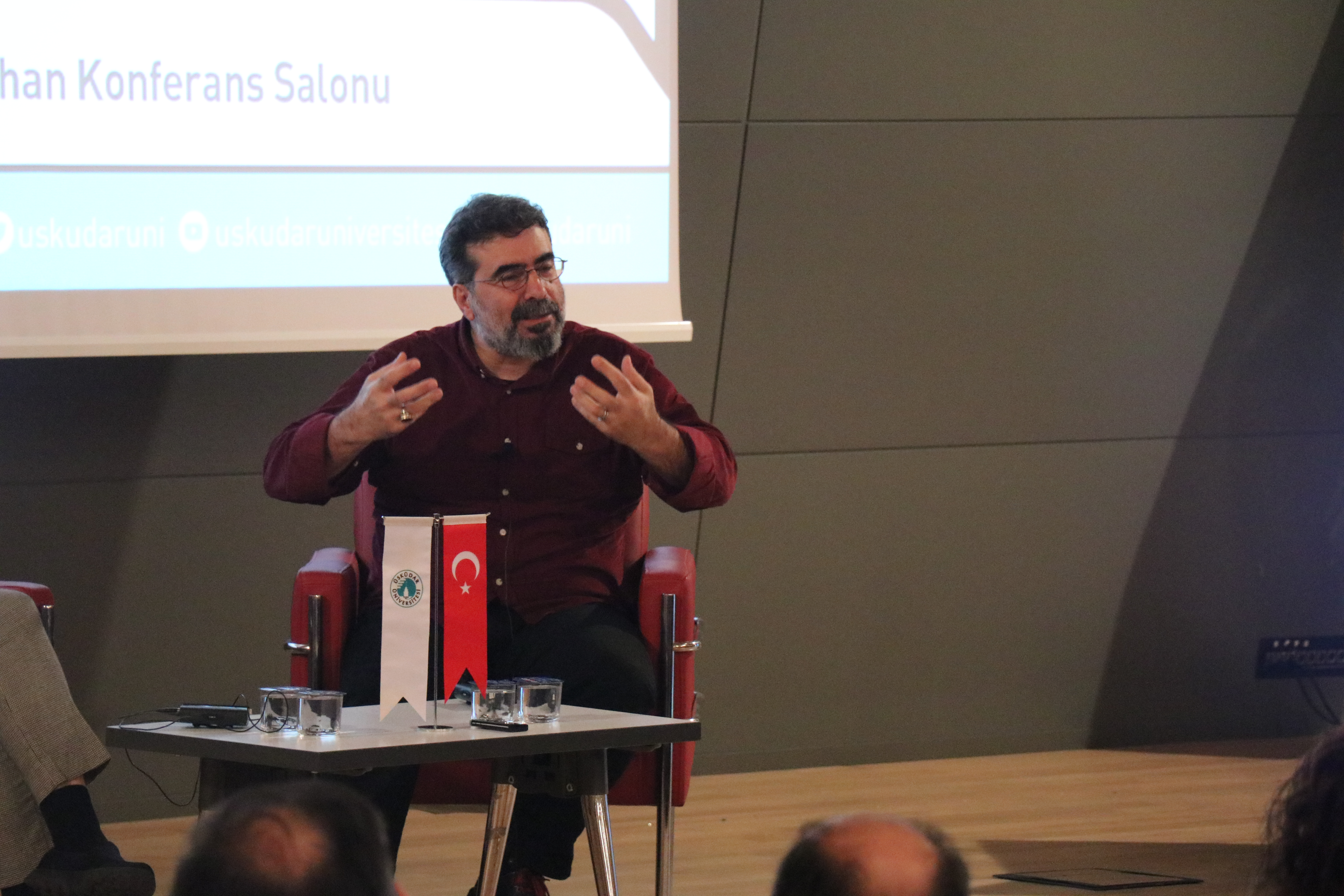
- Born: January 21, 1962 (age 63) Üsküdar, Istanbul, Turkey
- Occupation: Philosopher, researcher, writer
- Citizenship: Turkish
- Period: 1980–present

Dücane Cündioğlu (born January 21, 1962) is a Turkish philosopher and writer.

== Life ==
He was born in Üsküdar, Istanbul on January 21, 1962. He was involved in various political events during the politically turbulent period before the 1980 Turkish coup d'état. Due to these actions, he was convicted twice before he turned 18, was imprisoned as a political prisoner, and remained in prison for approximately four years.

His first writings were published under the title Letters from Taş Medrese in the newspaper Hergün. He learned Arabic, English, German, French, and Hebrew. During the late 1970s, while he was in prison, he began his writing career and later continued publishing articles in various magazines and newspapers. Starting in 1985, he worked in the field of publishing. He was a columnist for the newspaper Yeni Şafak for 13 years, ending this role on February 5, 2011. Afterwards, he withdrew into seclusion on Büyükada.

Beginning on April 2, 1980, his early writings addressed traditional religious sciences and modern critiques of these disciplines through fields such as logic, linguistics, and hermeneutics. In his later works, he examined the relationship between religion and science, as well as religion and politics, within the context of recent history, and published various monographs on these subjects. Over the years, he compiled his philosophical essays, written across diverse fields such as philosophy, theology, psychology, sufism, history, literature, translation, art, architecture, cinema into books to share with his readers.

== Works ==
- The Treatise on the Headscarf (1995)
- The Meaning of Understanding the Qur'an (1995)
- The Evaporation of Meaning and the Qur'an (1996)
- The Essence of the Word: On the Nature of Divine Speech (1996)
- From Oral Culture to Written Culture: The History of Meaning (1997)
- The Turkish Qur'an and Republican Ideology (1998)
- Conversations on the Qur'an, Language, and Politics (1998)
- On the Qur'an and Language (2005)
- On History and Politics (2005)
- The World of Qur'an Translations (1999)
- A Political Project: Worship in Turkish (1999)
- Truth and Superstition (1999)
- A Poet of the Qur'an: Mehmed Akif and His Qur'an Translation (2000)
- On Divine Love (2004)
- PhiloSopiaLoren (2004)
- The History of Backstreets: Memories and Memoirs (2004)
- The Ancient Discovery: On Imam al-Ghazali (2004)
- The Turkish of Philosophy: Republic-Philosophy-Critique (2004)
- Thought is Imagined (2005)
- On Akif (2005)
- Mehmed Akif's Qur'an Translations (2005)
- From Constitutionalism to the Republic: Religion and Politics (2005)
- Cemil Meriç: A Temple Keeper/Worker/Warrior (2006-2006-2007)
- On the Circle (2007)
- Eye Trace (2007)
- The Human Being (2009)
- The Four Colors of Death (2009)
- Architecture and Philosophy (2012)
- Cinema and Philosophy (2012)
- Art and Philosophy (2012)
- Motto (2016)
- Interpretation Tires (2019)
