= Önal =

Önal (IPA: [œˈnal]) is a Turkish surname. Notable people with the surname include:

- Ayşe Önal (born 1955), Turkish female journalist and writer
- Ayşe Hatun Önal (born 1978), Turkish model
- Funda Önal (born 1984), English model
- Füsun Önal, Turkish female pop singer
- Ömer Önal (born 1986), Turkish / British finance professional
- Güldeniz Önal (born 1986), Turkish volleyball player
- Murat Önal (born 1987), Turkish footballer
