= Hungarian irredentism =

Political ideas to reunite Historic Hungary

In green the Lands of the Crown of Saint Stephen (Transleithania), the Hungarian territories in the Austro-Hungarian monarchy consisting of the Kingdom of Hungary and the Kingdom of Croatia-Slavonia. Hungary also jointly governed the Condominium of Bosnia and Herzegovina (blue) with Austria (Cisleithania).

Hungarian irredentism or Greater Hungary (Hungarian: Nagy-Magyarország pronounced [ˈnɒɟ ˈmɒɟɒrorsaːɡ]) are irredentist political ideas concerning redemption of territories of the historical Kingdom of Hungary. The objective is to at least regain control over Hungarian-populated areas in Hungary's neighbouring countries. Hungarian historiography uses the term "Historic Hungary" (Hungarian: történelmi Magyarország). "Big Hungary" (Hungarian: Nagy-Magyarország) is also commonly used by supporters of this ideology.

The Treaty of Trianon defined the current borders of Hungary and, compared against the claims of the pre-war Kingdom, post-Trianon Hungary had approximately 72% less land and about two-thirds fewer inhabitants, almost 5 million of these being of Hungarian ethnicity. However, only 54% of the inhabitants of the pre-war Kingdom of Hungary were Hungarians before World War I. Following the treaty's instatement, Hungarian leaders became inclined towards revoking some of its terms. This political aim gained greater attention and was a serious national concern up through the Second World War.

After World War I, despite the "self-determination of peoples" idea of the Allied Powers, only one plebiscite was permitted (later known as the Sopron plebiscite) to settle disputed borders on the former territory of the Kingdom of Hungary, settling a smaller territorial dispute between the First Austrian Republic and the Kingdom of Hungary, because some months earlier, the Rongyos Gárda launched a series of attacks to oust the Austrian forces that entered the area. During the plebiscite in late 1921, the polling stations were supervised by British, French, and Italian army officers of the Allied Powers.

Irredentism in the 1930s led Hungary to form an alliance with Hitler's Nazi Germany. Eva S. Balogh states: "Hungary's participation in World War II resulted from a desire to revise the Treaty of Trianon so as to recover territories lost after World War I. This was the basis for Hungary's interwar foreign policy."

Hungary, supported by the Axis powers, was successful temporarily in gaining some regions of the former Kingdom by the First Vienna Award in 1938 (southern Czechoslovakia with mainly Hungarians) and the Second Vienna Award in 1940 (Northern Transylvania with an ethnically mixed population), and through military campaign gained regions of Carpathian Ruthenia in 1939 and (ethnically mixed) Bačka, Baranja, Međimurje, and Prekmurje in 1941 (Hungarian occupation of Yugoslav territories). Following the close of World War II, the borders of Hungary as defined by the Treaty of Trianon were restored, except for three Hungarian villages that were transferred to Czechoslovakia. These villages are today administratively a part of Bratislava.

== History ==
=== Background ===
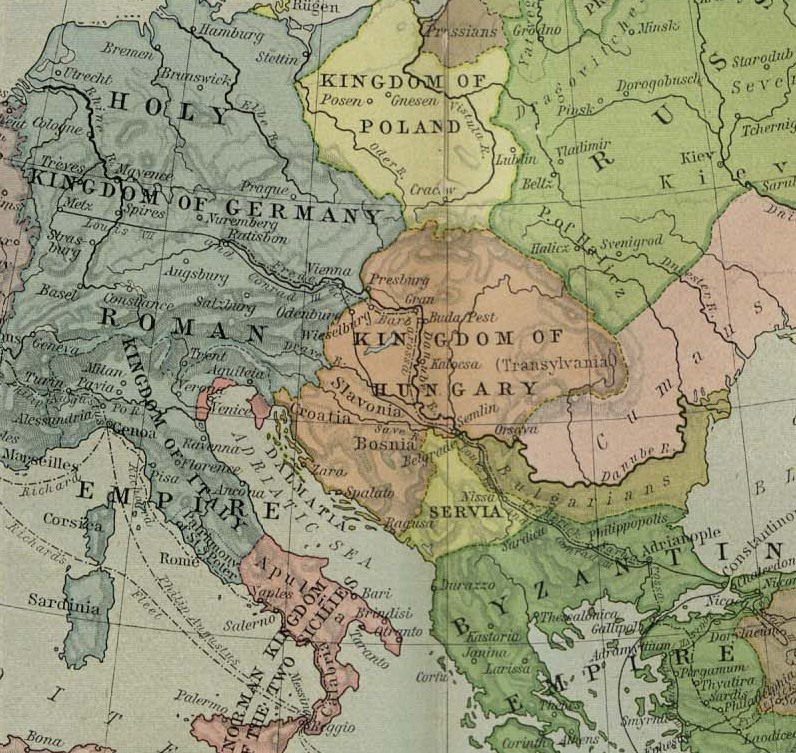
Kingdom of Hungary (shown in brown) around 1190 AD.

The independent Kingdom of Hungary was established in 1000 AD, and remained a regional power in Central Europe until Ottoman Empire conquered its central part in 1526 following the Battle of Mohács. In 1541 the territory of the former Kingdom of Hungary was divided into three portions: in the west and north, Habsburg Kingdom of Hungary retained its existence under Habsburg rule; the Ottomans controlled the south-central parts of former Kingdom of Hungary; while in the east, the Eastern Hungarian Kingdom (later the Principality of Transylvania) was formed as a semi-independent entity under Ottoman suzerainty. After the Ottoman conquest in the Kingdom of Hungary, the ethnic structure of the kingdom started to become more multi-ethnic because of immigration to the sparsely populated areas. Between 1683 and 1717, the Habsburg monarchy conquered all the Ottoman territories that were part of the Kingdom of Hungary before 1526, and incorporated some of these areas into the Habsburg Kingdom of Hungary.

After a suppressed uprising in 1848–1849, the Kingdom of Hungary and its diet were dissolved, and territory of the Kingdom of Hungary was divided into 5 districts, which were Pest & Ofen, Ödenburg, Preßburg, Kaschau and Großwardein, directly controlled from Vienna while Croatia, Slavonia, and the Voivodeship of Serbia and Banat of Temeschwar were separated from the Kingdom of Hungary between 1849 and 1860. This new centralized rule, however, failed to provide stability, and in the wake of military defeats the Austrian Empire was transformed into Austria-Hungary with the Austro-Hungarian Compromise of 1867, by which the Kingdom of Hungary became one of two constituent entities of the new dual monarchy with self-rule in its internal affairs.

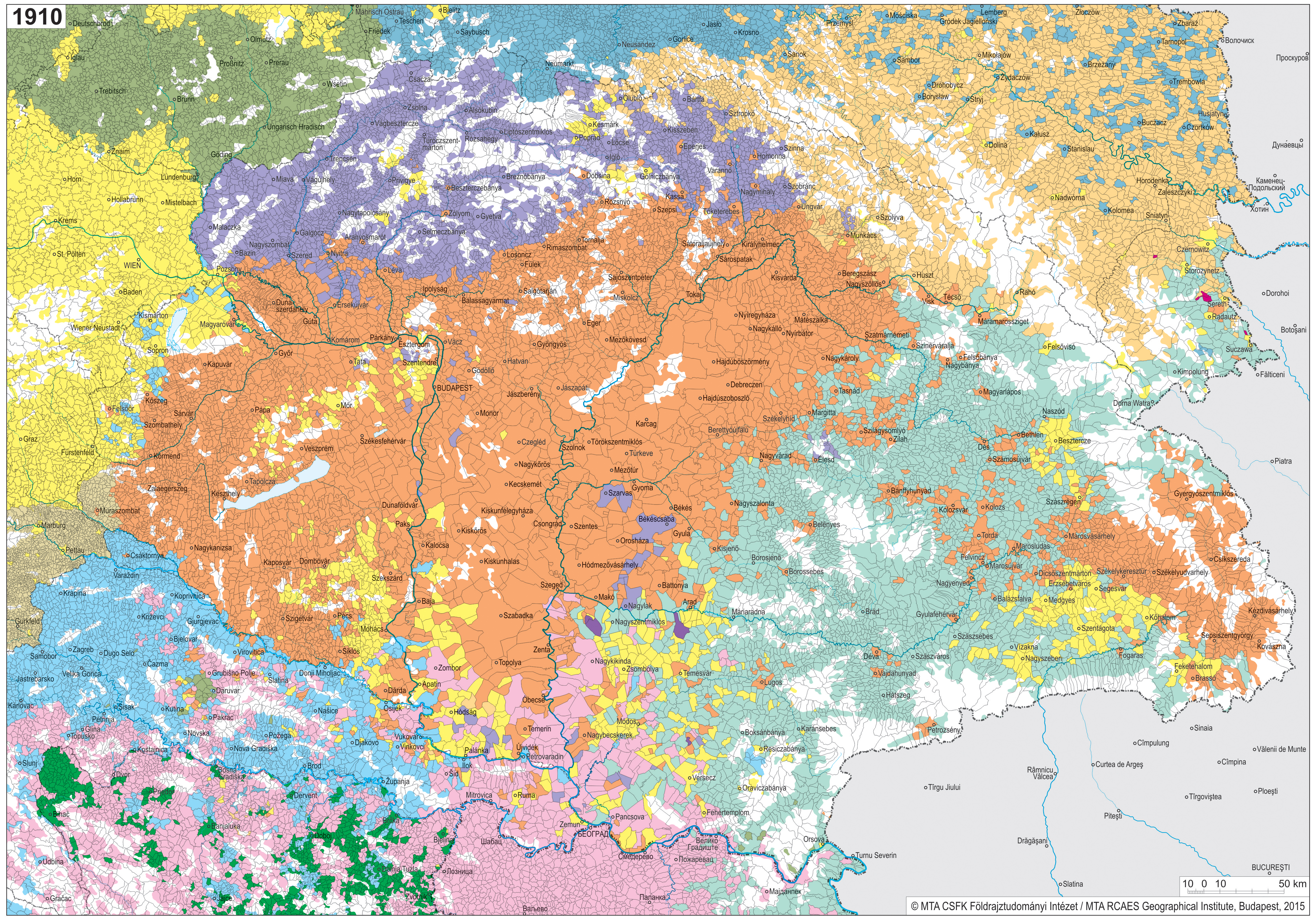
Ethnic map of the Kingdom of Hungary in 1910, based on the 1910 Hungarian census.

A considerable number of the figures who are today considered important in Hungarian culture were born in what are today parts of Romania, Slovakia, Poland, Ukraine, and Austria (see List of Hungarians who were born outside present-day Hungary). Names of Hungarian dishes, common surnames, proverbs, sayings, folk songs etc. also refer to these rich cultural ties. After 1867, the non-Hungarian ethnic groups were subject to assimilation and Magyarization.

Before World War I, only three European countries declared ethnic minority rights, and enacted minority-protecting laws: the first was Hungary (1849 and 1868), the second was Austria (1867), and the third was Belgium (1898). In contrast, the legal systems of other pre-WW1 era European countries did not allow the use of European minority languages in primary schools, in cultural institutions, in offices of public administration and at the legal courts.

Among the most notable policies was the promotion of the Hungarian language as the country's official language (replacing Latin and German); however, this was often at the expense of West Slavic languages and the Romanian language. The new government of autonomous Kingdom of Hungary took the stance that Kingdom of Hungary should be a Hungarian nation state, and that all other peoples living in the Kingdom of Hungary—Germans, Jews, Romanians, Slovaks, Poles, Ruthenes and other ethnicities—should be assimilated. (The Croats were to some extent an exception to this, as they had a fair degree of self-government within Croatia-Slavonia, a dependent kingdom within the Kingdom of Hungary.)

=== World War I ===
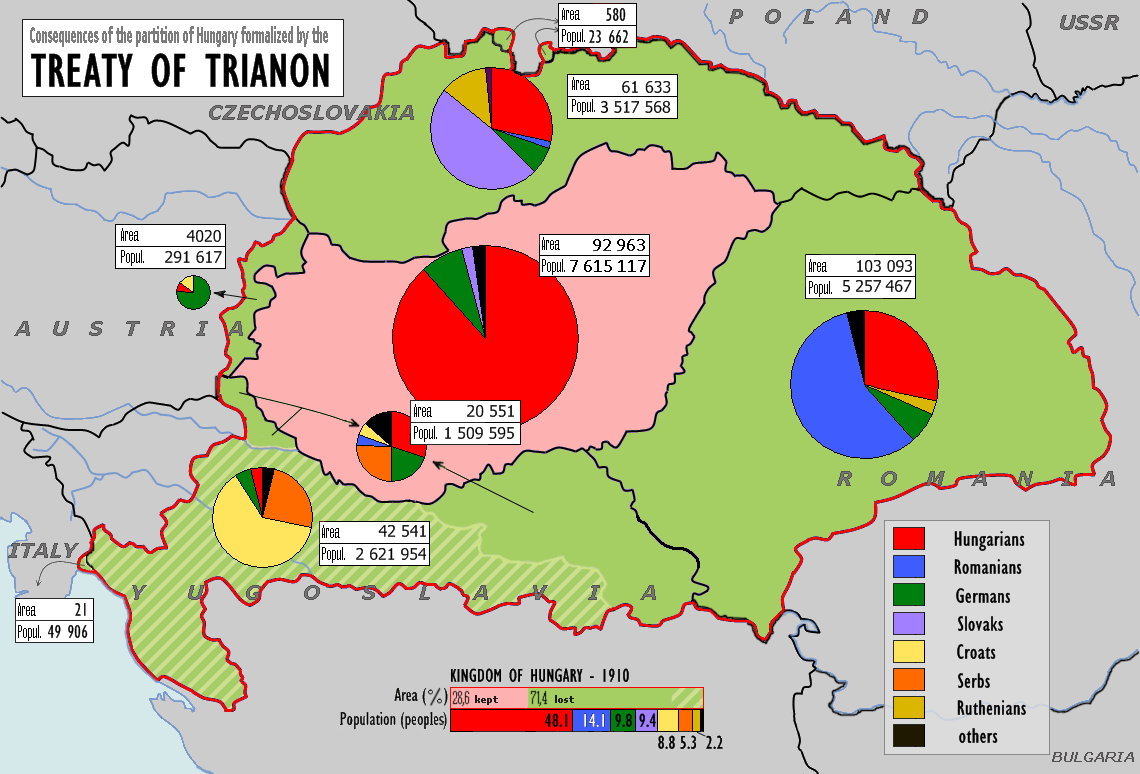
The ceded territories on the Treaty of Trianon and their population (red is for Hungarian)

The peace treaties signed after the First World War redefined the national borders of Europe. The dissolution of Austria-Hungary, after its defeat in the First World War, gave an opportunity for the subject nationalities of the old Monarchy to all form their own nation states (however, most of the resulting states nevertheless became multi-ethnic states comprising several nationalities). The Treaty of Trianon of 1920 defined borders for the new Hungarian state: in the north, the Slovak and Ruthene areas, including Hungarian majority areas became part of the new state of Czechoslovakia. Transylvania and most of the Banat became part of Romania, while Croatia-Slavonia and the other southern areas became part of the new state of Yugoslavia.

The arguments of Hungarian irredentists for their goal were: the presence of Hungarian majority areas in the neighboring countries, perceived historical traditions of the Kingdom of Hungary, or the perceived geographical unity and economic symbiosis of the region within the Carpathian Basin, although some Hungarian irredentists preferred to regain only ethnically Hungarian majority areas surrounding Hungary.

Post-Trianon Hungary had about half of the population of the former Kingdom. The population of the territories of the Kingdom of Hungary that were not assigned to the post-Trianon Hungary had, in total, non-Hungarian majority, although they included a sizable proportion of ethnic Hungarians and Hungarian majority areas. According to Károly Kocsis and Eszter Kocsis-Hodosi, the ethnic composition (by their native language) in 1910 (note: three-quarters of the Jewish population stated Hungarian as their mother tongue, and the rest, German, in the absence of Yiddish as an option):

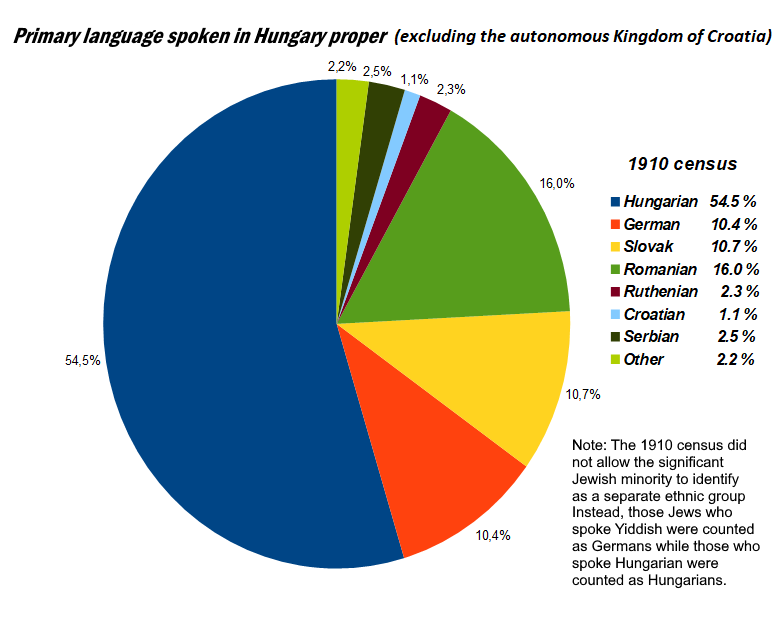
In the Kingdom of Hungary, the 1910 census was based on mother tongue. According to the census, 54.4% of the inhabitants of Hungary were recorded to speak Hungarian as their native language.

| Region | Hungarians | Germans | Romanians | Serbs | Croats | Ruthenians | Slovaks | Note |
|---|---|---|---|---|---|---|---|---|
| Transylvania | 31.7% | 10.5% | 54.0% | 0.9% | | | 0.6% | Hungarians are concentrated in Székely Land (Hungarian majority), while as well significant in the border areas. |
| Vojvodina | 28.1% | 21.4% | 5.0% | 33.8% | 6.0% | 0.9% | 3.7% | |
| Transcarpathia | 30.6% | 10.6% | 1.9% | | | 54.5% | 1.0% | 1.0% Slovaks and Czechs |
| Slovakia | 30.2% | 6.8% | | | | 3.5% | 57.9% | with Hungarians concentrated in the south, which has a Hungarian majority today. |
| Burgenland | 9.0% | 74.4% | | | 15% | | | |
| Croatia-Slavonia | 4.1% | 5.1% | | 24.6% | 62.5% | | | |

Trianon thus defined Hungary's new borders in a way that made ethnic Hungarians the overwhelmingly absolute majority in the country. Almost 3 million ethnic Hungarians remained outside the borders of post-Trianon Hungary. A considerable number of non-Hungarian nationalities remained within the new borders of Hungary, the largest of which were Germans (Schwabs) with 550,062 people (6.9%). Also, the number of Hungarian Jews remained within the new borders was 473,310 (5.9% of the total population), compared with 911,227 (5.0%), in 1910.

==== Aftermath ====
After the Treaty of Trianon, a political concept known as Hungarian Irredentism became popular in Hungary. The Treaty of Trianon was an injury for the Hungarian people and Hungarian nationalists have created an ideology with the political goal of the restoration of borders of historical pre-Trianon Kingdom of Hungary.

The justification for this aim usually followed the fact that two-thirds of the country's area was taken by the neighboring countries with approximately 3 million Hungarians living in these territories. Several municipalities that had purely ethnic Hungarian population were excluded from post-Trianon Hungary, which had borders designed to cut most economic regions (Szeged, Pécs, Debrecen etc.) in half, and keep railways on the other side. Moreover, five of the pre-war kingdom's ten largest cities were drawn into other countries.

All interwar governments of Hungary were obsessed with recovering at least the Magyar-populated territories outside Hungary. In 1934, Gyula Gömbös, on the request of Benito Mussolini, presented the territories which he wished to reannex peacefully.

=== World War II ===
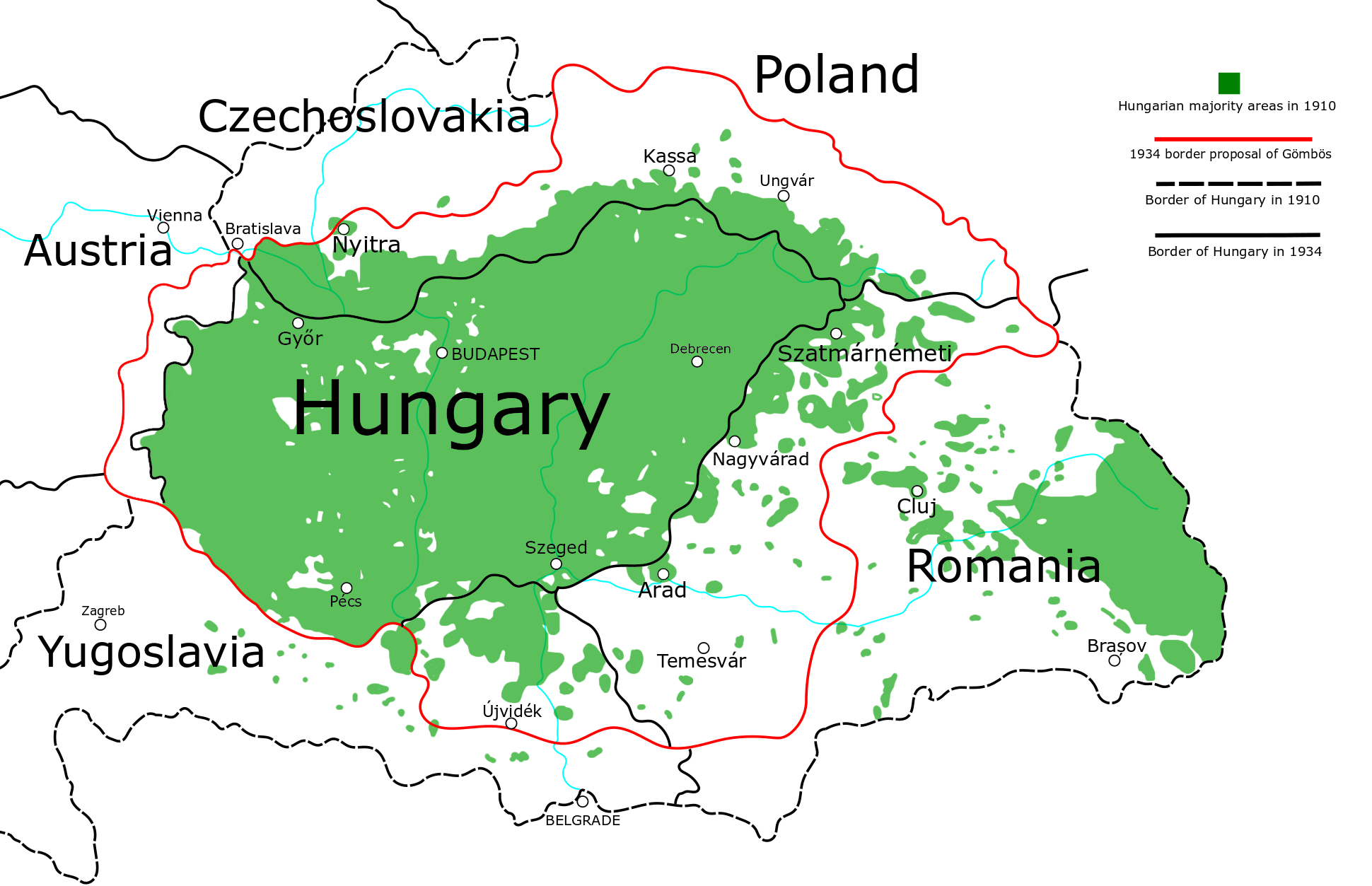
Gyula Gömbös's border proposal presented to Mussolini in 1934.

Hungary's government allied itself with Nazi Germany during World War II in exchange for assurances that Greater Hungary's borders would be restored. This goal was partially achieved when Hungary reannexed territories from Czechoslovakia, Romania, and Yugoslavia at the outset of the war. These annexations were affirmed under the Munich Agreement (1938), two Vienna Awards (1938 and 1940), and aggression against Yugoslavia (1941), the latter achieved one week after the German army had already invaded Yugoslavia.

The percentage of Hungarian speakers was 84% in southern Czechoslovakia and 15% in the Sub-Carpathian Rus.

In Northern Transylvania, the Romanian census from 1930 counted 38% Hungarians and 49% Romanians, while the Hungarian census from 1941 counted 53.5% Hungarians and 39.1% Romanians.

Ferenc Szálasi, leader of Hungary from 16 October 1944 envisioned the creation a "Carpathian-Danubian" federation where nationalism is region based ("connationalism") and other peoples are willing to join independently. He excluded the Jews who were not "rooted in" the Carpathian Basin, so they had to be relocated into a Jewish state, but not killed ("asemitism") according to him. Szálasi called his ideology Hungarism.

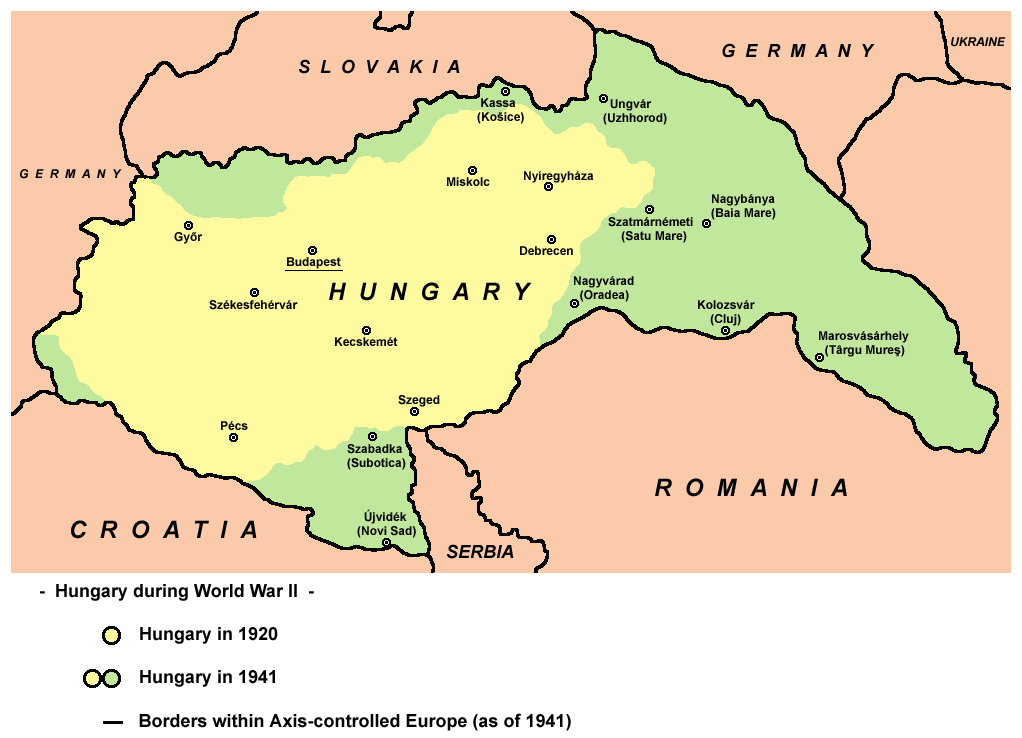
Hungary in 1920 and 1941

The Yugoslav territory occupied by Hungary (including Bačka, Baranja, Međimurje and Prekmurje) had approximately one million inhabitants, including 543,000 Yugoslavs (Serbs, Croats and Slovenes), 301,000 Hungarians, 197,000 Germans, 40,000 Slovaks, 15,000 Rusyns, and 15,000 Jews. In Bačka region only, the 1931 census put the percentage of the speakers of Hungarian at 34.2%, while one of interpretations of later Hungarian census from 1941 states that, 45,4% or 47,2% declared themselves to be Hungarian native speakers or ethnic Hungarians (this interpretation is provided by authors Károly Kocsis and Eszter Kocsisné Hodosi. The 1941 census, however, did not recorded ethnicity of the people, but only mother/native tongue). Population of entire Bačka numbered 789,705 inhabitants in 1941. This means that from the beginning of the occupation, the number of Hungarian speakers in Bačka increased by 48,550, while the number of Serbian speakers decreased by 75,166.

The establishment of Hungarian rule met with insurgency on part of the non-Hungarian population in some places and retaliation of the Hungarian forces was labelled war crimes such as Ip and Treznea massacres in Northern Transylvania (directed against Romanians) or Bačka, where Hungarian military between 1941 and 1944 deported or killed 19,573 civilians, mainly Serbs and Jews, but also Hungarians who did not collaborate with the new authorities. About 56,000 people were also expelled from Bačka.

The Jewish population of Hungary and the areas it occupied were partly diminished as part of the Holocaust. Tens of thousands of Romanians fled from Hungarian-ruled Northern Transylvania, and vice versa. After the war the areas were returned to neighboring countries and Hungary's territory was slightly further reduced by ceding three villages south of Bratislava to Slovakia. Some Hungarians were killed both in Yugoslavia by Yugoslav partisans (the exact number of ethnic Hungarians killed by Yugoslav partisans is not clearly established and estimates range from 4,000 to 40,000; 20,000 is often regarded as most probable), and in Transylvania by the Maniu Guard towards the end of World War II.

== Modern era ==
In 2010, Hungary changed its citizenship legislation, thus any subject who could certify ancestry on any territory historically belonging to Hungary may as well be granted Hungarian citizenship, if they are able to speak the Hungarian language (the Csangos may have an exception of the first criteria, as the area they live was not part of Hungary, regarding them also ecclesial documents may be accepted).

The following table lists areas with Hungarian population in neighboring countries today:

| Country, region | Hungarians | Cultural, political center | Proposed autonomy |
| Romania parts of Transylvania (mainly Harghita, Covasna and part of Mureș counties, Central Romania), see: Hungarians in Romania | 1,227,623 (6.5%) in Romania; 1,216,666 (17.9%) in Transylvania | Târgu Mureș; Cluj-Napoca | Székely Land (which would have an area of 13,000 km^{2} and a population of 809,000 people of which 75.65% Hungarians) |
| Serbia parts of Vojvodina in northern Serbia, see: Hungarians in Serbia | 184,442 (2.7%) in Serbia; 182,321 (10.5%) in Vojvodina | Subotica | Hungarian Regional Autonomy (which would have an area of 3,813 km^{2} and a population of 253,977 people of which 44.4% Hungarians and 29% Serbs) |
| Slovakia parts of southern Slovakia, see: Hungarians in Slovakia | 422,065 (7.7%) | Komárno | — |
| Ukraine parts of Zakarpattia Oblast in southwestern Ukraine, see: Hungarians in Ukraine | 156,566 (0.3%) in Ukraine; 151,533 (12.09%) in Transcarpathia | Berehove | — |

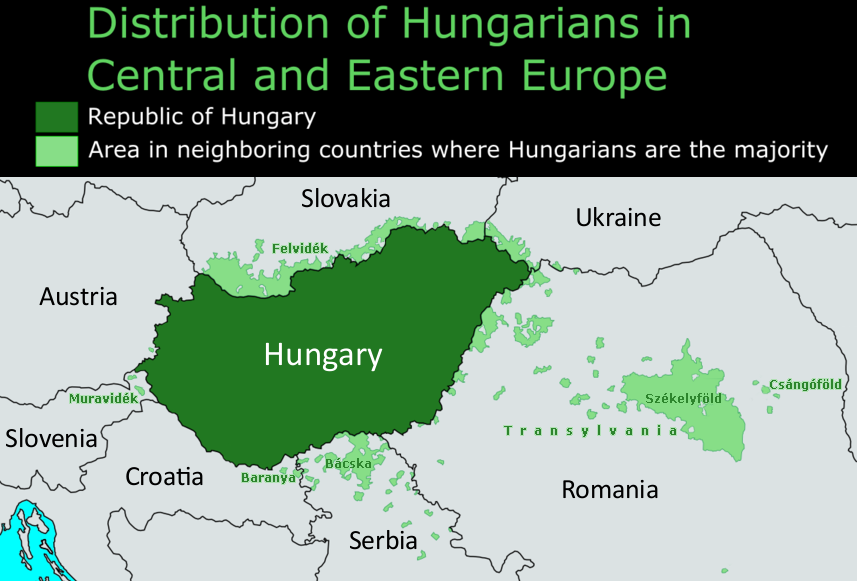
Areas with ethnic Hungarian majorities in the neighboring countries of Hungary, according to László Sebők.

During the Communist era, Marxist–Leninist ideology and Stalin's theory on nationalities considered nationalism to be a malady of a bourgeois capitalism. In Hungary, the minorities' question disappeared from the political agenda. Communist hegemony guaranteed a facade of inter-ethnic peace while failing to secure a lasting accommodation of minority interests in unitary states.

The fall of Communism aroused the expectations of Hungarian minorities in neighboring countries and left Hungary unprepared to deal with the issue. Hungarian politicians campaigned to formalize the rights of Hungarian minorities in neighboring countries, thus causing anxiety in the region. They secured agreements on the necessity for guaranteeing collective rights and formed new Hungarian minority organizations to promote cultural rights and political participation. In Romania, Slovakia, and Yugoslavia (now Serbia), former Communists secured popular legitimacy by accommodating nationalist tendencies that were hostile to minority rights.

The authoritarian and nationalist government of Viktor Orbán (2010-2026) regularly provokes with statements and allusions to Greater Hungary. In 2011 Hungary took the presidency over the EU. When the "historical timeline" features was presented – among other cultural, historical and scientific symbols or images of Hungary – an 1848 map of Greater Hungary, when Budapest ruled over large swathes of its neighbors, was shown. In May 2020, Prime Minister Viktor Orbán created some waves in neighbouring nations with a historical map of the Kingdom of Hungary, which he posted on Facebook, before the annual school leaving exam for secondary school students. The latest controversy was stirred in 2022 when Orbán wore a scarf adorned with a map of Greater Hungary at a football match.

=== Hungary ===
The campaign materials of Jobbik during the early 2010s contained maps of the pre-1920 Greater Hungary.

=== Slovakia ===
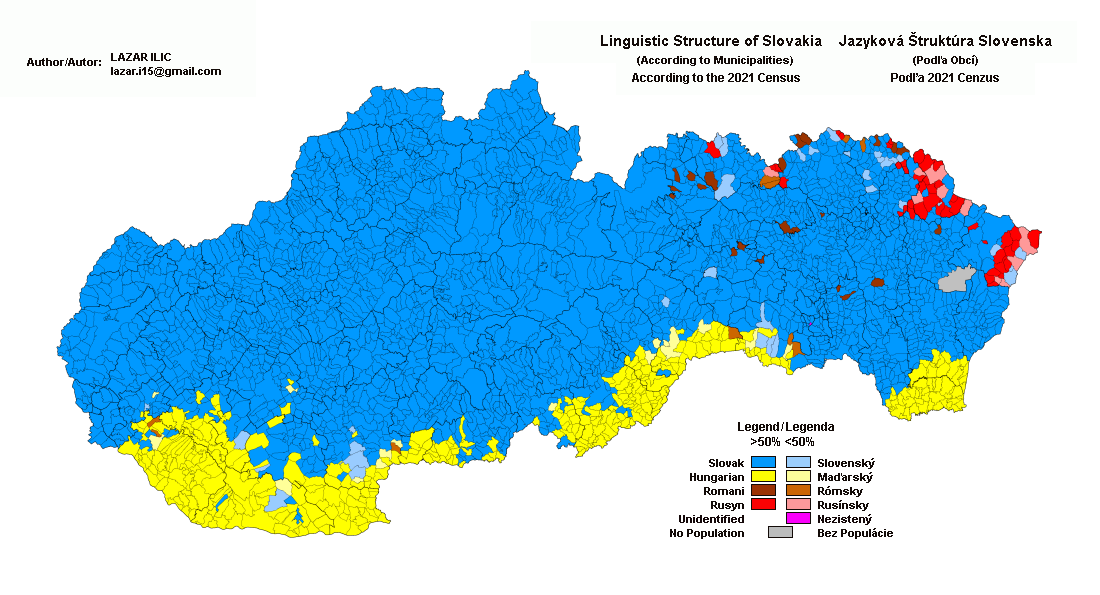
Linguistic makeup of Slovakia, according to Census 2021, Yellow Hungarian

Under great pressure from the EU and NATO, Hungary signed a bilateral state treaty with Slovakia on Good Neighborly Relations and Friendly Cooperation in March 1995, aimed at resolving disputes concerning borders and minority rights. Its vague language, though, allows rival interpretations. One cause of conflict was the COE's Recommendation 1201 which stipulates the creation of autonomous self-government based on ethnic principles in areas where ethnic minorities represent a majority of the population.

The Hungarian Prime Minister insisted that the treaty protected the Hungarian minority as a "community". Slovakia accepted the 1201 Recommendation in the treaty, but denounced the concept of collective rights of minorities and political autonomy as "unacceptable and destabilizing". Slovakia finally ratified the treaty in March 1996 after the government attached a unilateral declaration that the accord would not provide for collective autonomy for Hungarians. The Hungarian government therefore refused to recognize the validity of the declaration.

=== Romania ===
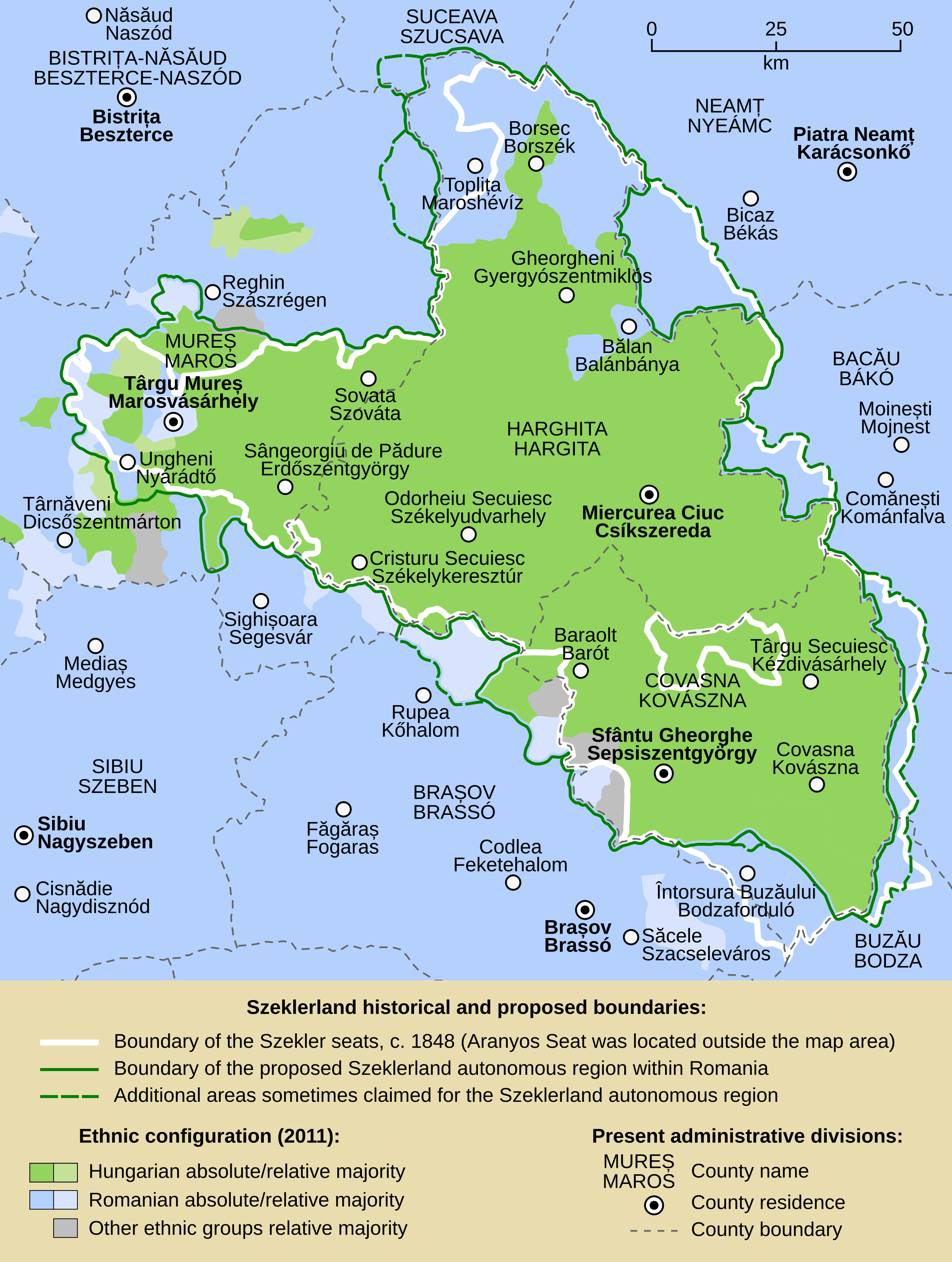
Szekely Land as envisaged by the autonomy supporters

After World War II, a Hungarian Autonomous Region was created in Transylvania, which encompassed most of the land inhabited by the Székelys. This region lasted until 1964 when the administrative reform divided Romania into the current counties. From 1947 until the 1989 Romanian Revolution and the death of Nicolae Ceaușescu, a systematic Romanianization of Hungarians took place, with several discriminatory provisions, denying them their cultural identity. This tendency started to abate after 1989, the question of Székely autonomy remains a sensitive issue.

On 16 September 1996, after five years of negotiations, Hungary and Romania also signed a bilateral treaty, which had been stalled over the nature and extent of minority protection that Bucharest should grant to Hungarian citizens. Hungary dropped its demands for autonomy for ethnic minorities; in exchange, Romania accepted a reference to Recommendation 1201 in the treaty, but with a joint interpretive declaration that guarantees individual rights, but excludes collective rights and territorial autonomy based on ethnic criteria. These concessions were made in large measure because both countries recognized the need to improve good neighborly relations as a prerequisite for NATO membership.

=== Serbia ===
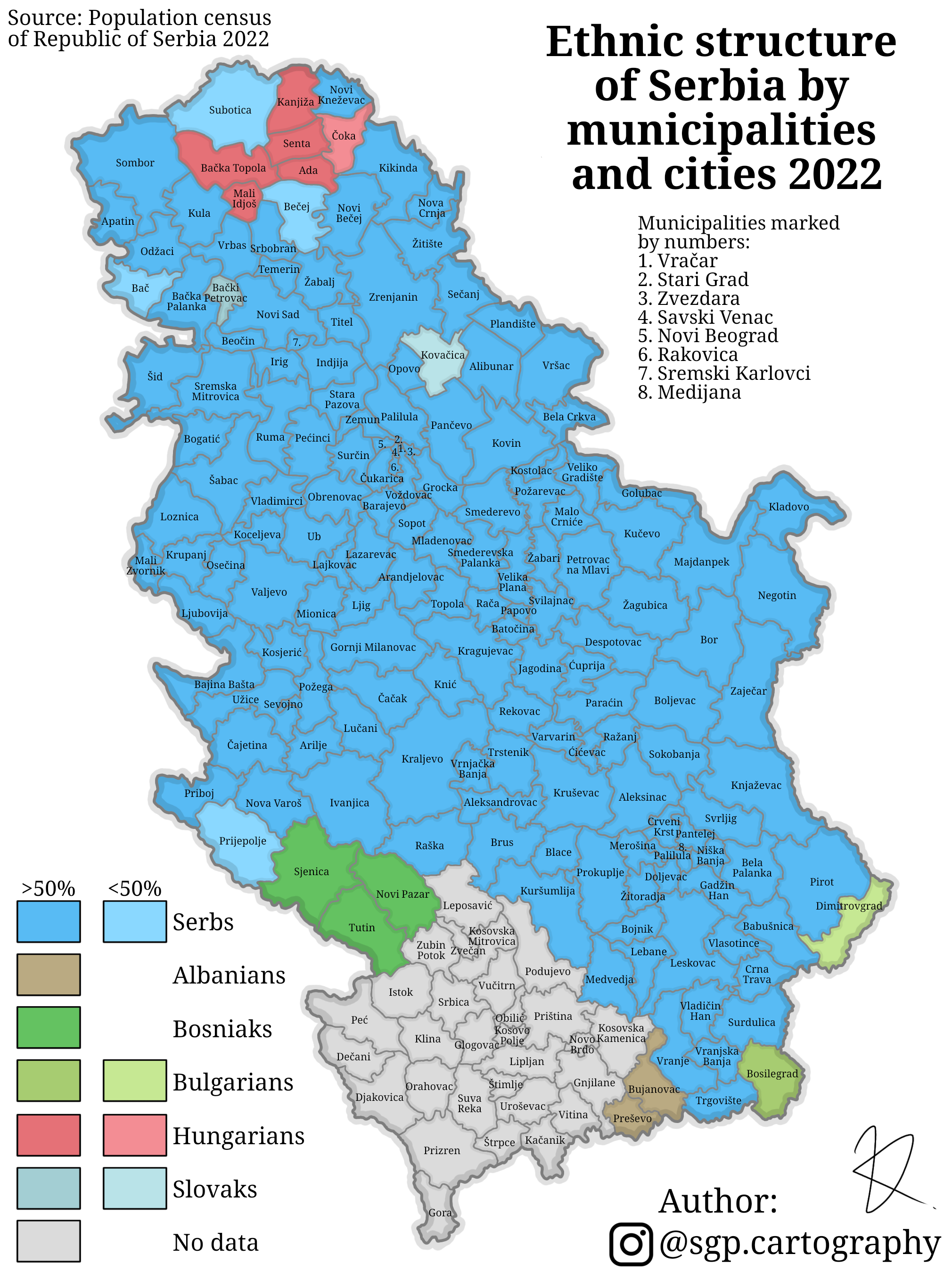
Ethnic map of Serbia by municipalities, municipalities with a Hungarian ethnic majority in red

The National Council of the Hungarian Ethnic Minority in Serbia is a representation body of the Hungarian ethnic minority in Serbia, established for the protection of the rights and the minority self-government of Hungarians in Serbia.

The Alliance of Vojvodina Hungarians is the major ethnic minority party representing interests of Hungarians in Serbia. It advocated the establishment of territorial autonomy for Hungarians in the northern part of Vojvodina (the municipalities with a Hungarian ethnic majority) during the 2000s, a proposal that is no longer actively pursued.

=== Ukraine ===
By 2015, the Hungarian authorities announced that they had granted citizenship to around 100,000 ethnic Hungarians in Transcarpathia. Despite Ukraine's constitution stating that there is only one form of citizenship in the country, the Kyiv government generally overlooked the issuance of Hungarian passports in Zakarpattia for several years, as many of them also held dual citizenship. Since 2021, the only individuals legally barred from acquiring dual citizenship in Ukraine are civil servants.

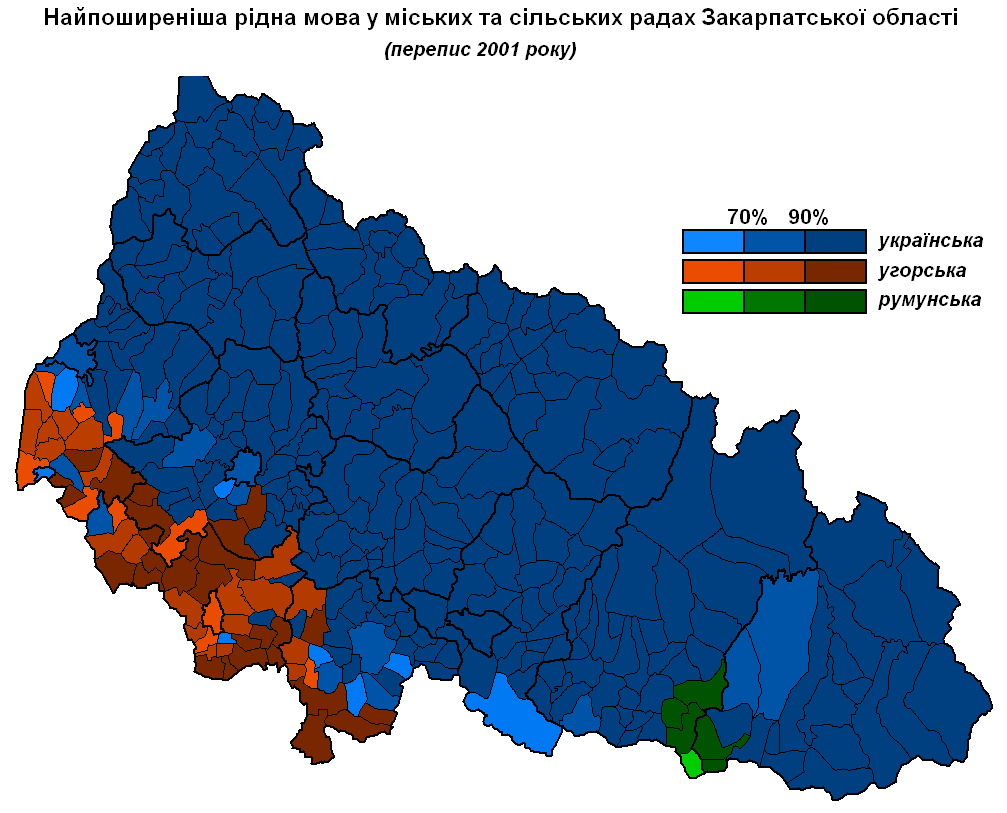
Most common mother tongue and its prevalence by urban and rural district in Zakarpattia Oblast, 2001 census

In 2018, the Hungarian Cultural Federation in Transcarpathia (KMKSZ) requested to establish a separate Hungarian constituency by referring to Article 18 of the current Law "On Elections of People's Deputies", which states that electoral districts must be formed, including taking into account the residence of national minorities. Such a constituency, which is often called Pritysyansky (from the name of the Tisza River, along which the Hungarian minority lives along the Transcarpathia), already existed in the parliamentary elections in Ukraine in 1998 and virtually retained its limits in the 2002 elections, granting presence for the representants of the Hungarian minority in the Verkhovna Rada.

The issue restarted during the election campaign of the presidential elections in Ukraine in the spring of 2019. László Brenzovics, the head of KMKSZ filed a lawsuit against the Central Election Commission of Ukraine for refusing to create the so-called Pritysyansky constituency – a separate constituency on the territory of 4 districts of Transcarpathia along the Tisza River, where the ethnic Hungarians are compact, allegedly for the purpose of electing their representative in the Verkhovna Rada. Preparing for the fact that the court is likely to support the legitimate refusal of the CEC, the Hungarians began to act at the level of the local councils of Transcarpathia.

On 17 May, at a regular session of the Beregovo City Council, chairman of the largest pro-Hungarian faction of the Hungarian Democratic Federation in Ukraine (UDMSZ), Karolina Darcsi, – accused for anti-Ukrainian stance – planned to read the appeal of deputies to the CEC to create the Pritysyansky Hungarian constituency in Transcarpathia. However, in the absence of a quorum, the session of the city council never took place.

The 2022 Russian invasion of Ukraine revived interest among Hungarian nationalists for annexing parts of Ukraine.

On 27 January 2024 László Toroczkai said at a conference that his party Mi Hazánk Mozgalom would lay claim to a Hungarian-populated region in western Ukraine if the war led to Ukraine losing its statehood.

== See also ==
- Trianon Syndrome
- Little Entente
- Croatian–Romanian–Slovak friendship proclamation
- Međimurje under Hungarian rule

== Sources ==
- Taylor, A.J.P. (1948). The Habsburg Monarchy 1809–1918 – A History of the Austrian Empire and Austria-Hungary. London: Hamish Hamilton.
