= Ali Bayramoğlu =

Turkish writer and political commentator (born 1956)

Ali Bayramoğlu (born 1956 in Istanbul, Turkey), is a Turkish writer and political commentator. He was a columnist in the Turkish daily newspaper Yeni Safak, writing from a liberal pro-Islamic viewpoint. He has campaigned against ultra-nationalism, militarism and restrictions on Islamic political parties in Turkey, and in favour of greater recognition of, and accommodation with, the Kurdish population of Turkey, and a break with what he sees as Ottomanist tendencies which prevent Turkey from moving forward on issues such as the Armenian genocide. He has also campaigned in support of the Turkish president Recep Tayyip Erdoğan and warned against the possible rise of left-wing political violence in Turkey.
