= İbrahim Karagül =

Turkish journalist (born 1969)

İbrahim Karagül (born 1969 in Sinlice, Şalpazarı, Trabzon Province) is a Turkish journalist and a former editor in chief of the newspaper Yeni Şafak.

== Education and early life ==
He attended primary school in Sinlice, secondary education he received in Rize, Ordu and Trabzon. He graduated from the Imam Hatip school in Trabzon. He studied law at the Dokuz Eylül University in Izmir. Since his student years, he worked in various media and worked as foreign news editor. He also stayed in Malaysia for a while, and translated a novel of the Malaysian author Shahnon Ahmad into Turkish.

== Professional career ==
Karagül started working in Yeni Şafak in 1995, and is known for his articles and columns focusing on foreign politics. He was appointed as the general editor of TVNET television in 2011. Then in July 2012, Karagül was appointed the editor-in-chief of Yeni Şafak of the Albayrak holding. During his tenure the newspaper turned into an outlet which staunchly supported the Turkish Government around Recep Tayyip Erdoğan. His articles are often cited in the international press as he claims that the U.S. attempted to kill the Turkish president Erdoğan supported the Turkish offensive in North-East Syria or accused foreign brokers of leading an attack against Turkey by the means of financial terrorism. He also assumed that Turkey is under attack by the U.S. who allegedly unleashed the Kurdistan Workers' Party (PKK) and the Islamic State of Iraq and the Levant (ISIL) on Turkey. During the Nagorno Karabakh conflict between Azerbaijan and Armenians, he insinuated that missiles should hit the city center of Yerevan "accidentally". Karagül resigned from his position of editor in chief in Yeni Şafak in December 2020.

== Controversies ==
Uğur Derin, Turkish history scholar, has described Karagül as a "pro-Erdoğan columnist" who "connects every possible incident to a foreign conspiracy."

=== Wild Fire ===
As in August 2021 he claimed that the Republican Peoples' Party (CHP) and the PKK were behind the raging wild fires, the CHP filed a criminal complaint against him.

=== The "Jewish Tribe" ===
On 23 February 2026, Karagül published an article in which he framed Israel and “the Jewish tribe” as a global existential threat. He claims that Israel and "the Jewish tribe" manipulate world events, finance, and conflicts to dominate humanity, alleging that they plan the destruction of entire nations and are "at war with the human race." Karagül described Jews as having "corrupted human genetics" and as a "race at war with all of humanity," and he portrays their statehood as a "seventy-year lie" through which they have created global control networks. He accused Jews of orchestrating war and genocide. Based on this worldview, Karagül advocated stripping Israel of its statehood, disarming it, keeping "Jews away from all areas of power," establishing oversight over its nuclear capabilities, and even considering preventive military action if Israel cannot be contained. He also called for Turkey and other regional powers to acquire nuclear weapons as a deterrent, describing this as a necessary measure to prevent what he claims is an imminent global catastrophe engineered by Jews and Israel.

On a post on X (Formerly Twitter) he declared: "As long as Israel exists in this region, no nation will be safe. Everyone living in this region is obligated to be an enemy of Israel. Jews, in every country where they live, are an internal threat. Turkiye must become a nuclear power immediately. ... Israelis should not be safe in any country."

== Personal life ==
Karagül is married and has two children.
