= Ayşe Önal =

Turkish journalist and writer

- Education: Psychology degree (1978)
- Occupations: Journalist, writer
- Employers: Nokta (1984–1994); Kanal 7; Akşam; Show TV
- Notable work: Honour Killing: Stories of Men Who Killed (2004)
- Awards: IWMF Courage in Journalism Award (1996)

Ayşe Önal (born 1955) is a Turkish journalist and writer. A former editor of Nokta, in 2000 she moved to London and became foreign correspondent for Kanal 7, before moving to Akşam and Show TV in 2003. Her best known book is Honour Killing: Stories of Men Who Killed (2004, Turkish, 2008 English).

== Career ==
Önal graduated in psychology in 1978. She worked as a psychological counselor at a juvenile prison in the early 1980s, but was fired when the government found out she was "kind of a leftist," as Önal described herself. She joined the weekly Nokta in 1984 as a political reporter, and became its editor-in-chief. In this position she was attacked with a firearm in February 1994, together with a Nokta correspondent.

Önal was one of the first people to write about JİTEM, for Dinç Bilgin's Ateş newspaper on 2 July 1994. Önal had learned about it from Veli Küçük after being introduced to him through MIT spy and fellow journalist, Tuncay Güney. Önal and Küçük's meeting did not go well, and Önal vowed to write about it. She followed through, and was promptly fired, along with nineteen of her coworkers. In 1994 Turkish Hizballah published a death threat against her, leading Önal to go into hiding in Cyprus for three months.

From 1995 to 1997, she hosted a discussion show Minefield on Kanal 7, which brought together Jews, Armenians and Turks five days a week in a way not previously seen on Turkish television. In 2000, she moved to London and became foreign correspondent for Kanal 7, before moving to Akşam and Show TV in 2003.

The International Women's Media Foundation, which gave her a Courage in Journalism Award in 1996, said of her in 2008: "Onal has been a controversial journalist most of her life. She was on the hit list of both the revolutionary left and the Islamic radicals. Her early kudos came from reports on prison abuse of children, but she went on to cover the first Gulf War, the war in Bosnia and the evolving political situation of the Kurds. She rattled the Turkish government by many reports about corruption and in the mid-1990s officials put her on a black list, which effectively barred her from employment in any media controlled by the government. That “embargo” against her was lifted right before she got the Courage Award but she was still seen as almost unemployable."

Önal's daughter Şafak Pavey was elected to the Grand National Assembly of Turkey in 2011.

== Awards ==
- International Women's Media Foundation Courage in Journalism Award 1996
- fourteen Turkish National Press Awards

== Bibliography ==
- Honour Killing: Stories of Men Who Killed (2004 Turkish, 2008 English, 2013 Japanese) ISBN 978-0-86356-617-2.
