= Trianon syndrome =

Hungarian post-World War I social phenomenon

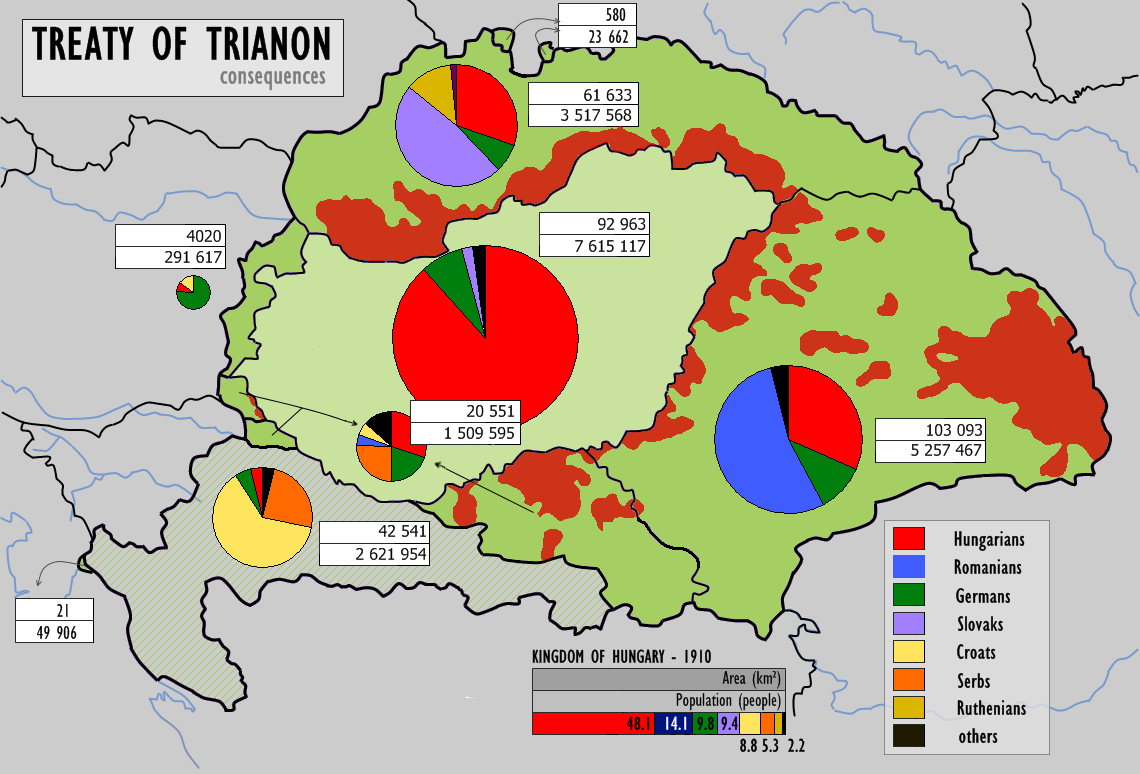
Map of the Treaty of Trianon. In red are the Hungarian communities that were left outside of Hungary after the signing of the treaty.

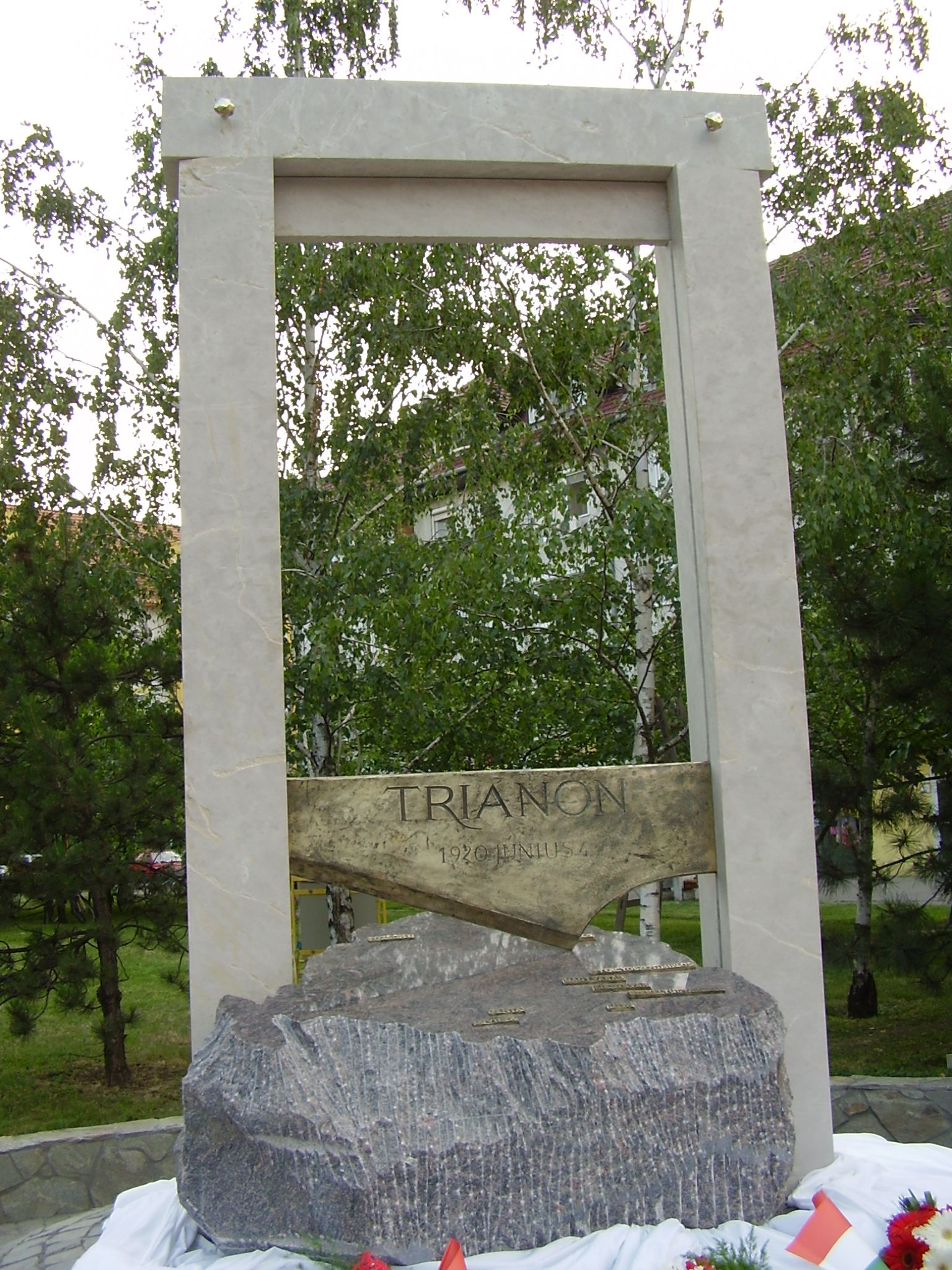
Memorial of the Treaty of Trianon in Békéscsaba, Hungary

The Trianon syndrome or Trianon trauma (Hungarian: Trianon szindróma or Trianon trauma) is the name given to a social phenomenon mostly occurring in Hungary. It consists of resentment about the consequences of the 1920 Treaty of Trianon and the belief that Hungary was better in the past than in the present. The Treaty of Trianon was a peace treaty signed after World War I through which the Kingdom of Hungary lost over two-thirds of its land to Austria, Czechoslovakia, Italy, the Kingdom of Serbs, Croats and Slovenes (later renamed to Yugoslavia), Poland and Romania. The Trianon syndrome may also be considered as existing in some of these countries in the form of worry about Hungarian revisionism.

The Trianon syndrome had great relevance in Hungary from 1920 to 1945, after which the country was occupied by the Soviet Union, and re-emerged following the end of Soviet influence in 1990, with current Hungarian society being divided between those who remain resentful about the Treaty of Trianon and those who prefer to forget it. The Trianon syndrome has been exploited by nationalist and populist politicians in Hungary, particularly by the political party Fidesz during its rule in the country, and Viktor Orbán during his tenure as Prime Minister of Hungary. This has been done through commemorations, nationalist rallies and the raising of monuments. For instance, since 2010, every 4 June is commemorated in Hungary as the Day of National Unity, originally approved with the hope of bringing Hungary closer to the Hungarian diaspora living outside of the country.

Hungarian media has also suggested that the Trianon syndrome is found in Romania as well, among politicians and nationalist intellectuals. As the centenary of the signing of the treaty got closer, articles on the treaty in Romanian media increased in number. Furthermore, a Romanian politician, Titus Corlățean, pushed for the declaration of 4 June as the Trianon Treaty Day in Romania to celebrate the union of Transylvania with the country. This holiday was in the end promulgated on 18 November 2020 by the then President of Romania Klaus Iohannis.

The administrative division of Slovakia, which disadvantages the Hungarian minority of the country, and the non-recognition of the independence declaration of Kosovo by both Romania and Slovakia have also been attributed to the Trianon syndrome by Hungarian media.

== See also ==
- Sèvres Syndrome
