= Hungarian Regional Autonomy =

Proposed territorial autonomy for Hungarians in Serbia

The Hungarian Regional Autonomy (Hungarian: Magyar Körzeti Önkormányzat; Serbian: Мађарска регионална самоуправа, romanized: Mađarska regionalna samouprava) was a proposed territorial autonomy for ethnic Hungarians in Serbia, located in the northern part of Vojvodina province. It was promoted in the 2000s by the Alliance of Vojvodina Hungarians, a major Hungarian minority political party in Serbia, but the initiative is no longer actively pursued.

== Proposals and initiatives ==
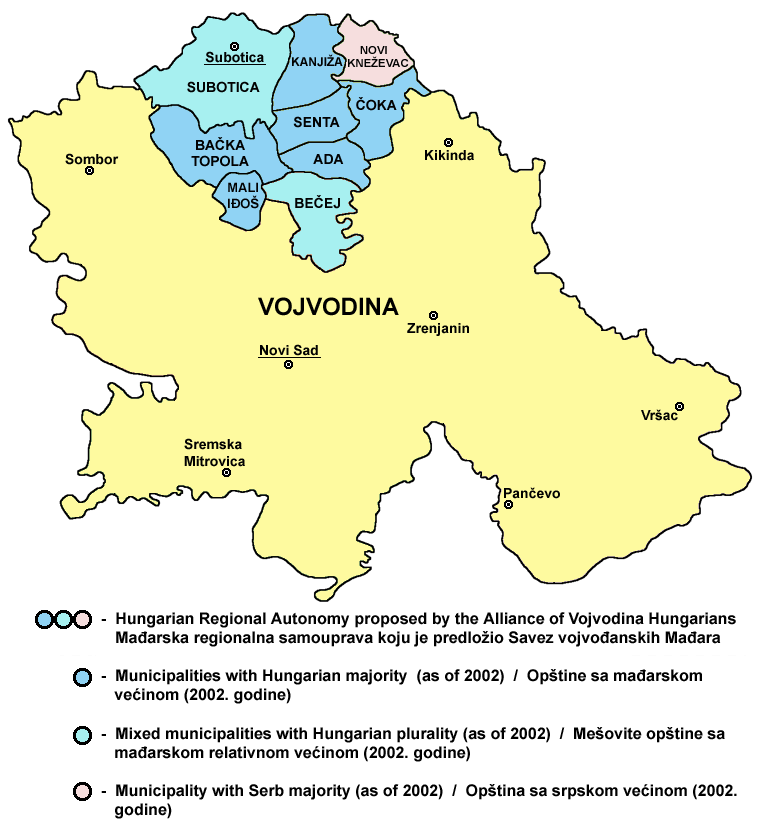
Map of the proposed Hungarian Regional Autonomy

The creation of territorial autonomy for ethnic Hungarians in Serbia was proposed by the Alliance of Vojvodina Hungarians political party during the 2000s and was largely based on the autonomy model of South Tyrol in Italy. The Hungarian Regional Autonomy was envisaged as a territorial unit with the area of 3,813 km² and population of 253,977 inhabitants. It would include nine municipalities in northern part of Vojvodina: Subotica, Bačka Topola, Mali Iđoš, Kanjiža, Senta, Ada, Bečej, Čoka, and Novi Kneževac. The administrative centre of the region would be Subotica, while the territorial unit itself would be part of Vojvodina province.

Contrary to this, the proposal of the 64 Counties Movement advocates creation of Hungarian territorial autonomy on a much larger territory, which would include not only municipalities with Hungarian majority or plurality, but also sizable neighboring municipalities with ethnic Serb majority.

== Demographics ==
According to data from the 2022 census, the proposed territorial unit would include 61% of all Hungarians living in Serbia. Ethnic structure would be as follows: 44.4% Hungarians, 29% Serbs, 4.3% Croats, 3.6% Bunjevci, 3.2% Roma, and others.

The municipalities with ethnic Hungarian majority are: Kanjiža (83.1%), Senta (75.7%), Ada (72.7%), Bačka Topola (55.6%), and Mali Iđoš (51.8%). Hungarians make plurality of the population in Čoka (44.8%).

The municipality of Novi Kneževac has ethnic Serb majority (58%); Serbs make plurality of the population in Bečej (42.3%) and Subotica (34.3%).

== Political parties ==
In the 2024 local elections, the Alliance of Vojvodina Hungarians won the largest number of seats in the municipal assemblies of Kanjiža, Senta, Bačka Topola, and Mali Iđoš. Serbian Progressive Party won the most votes in Čoka, which has ethnic Hungarian relative majority.

== See also ==
- Hungarians in Serbia
