= Abdurrahim Boynukalın =

Turkish politician and journalist

President of the Justice and Development Party Youth Wing
- Incumbent
- Assumed office 12 October 2014
- Preceded by: Zafer Çubukcu

Member of the Grand National Assembly
- In office 7 June 2015 – 1 November 2015
- Constituency: Istanbul (III) (June 2015)

Deputy Minister of Ministry of Youth and Sports
- In office 18 December 2015 – 26 April 2018

Personal details
- Born: 15 September 1987 (age 39) Turkey
- Party: Justice and Development Party
- Education: Sakarya University; Istanbul University; City University of London

Abdurrahim Boynukalın (born 15 September 1987) is a Turkish politician and journalist, Justice and Development Party United Kingdom Representative. Between 12 October 2014 and 20 December 2015, he served as the Head of the Youth Branch of the Justice and Development Party. He was also a Member of Parliament for Istanbul's 3rd electoral district between 7 June and 1 November 2015, having been elected at the June 2015 general election. Between 18 December 2015 and 26 April 2018, he attended as the Deputy Minister of Youth and Sports.

== Early life and career ==
Abdurrahim Boynukalın was born in 1987 and graduated from Sakarya University Faculty of Administration. He obtained a master's degree from Istanbul University Faculty of International Relations. After obtaining a second master's degree from City University of London Department of Media Communications, he became a journalist at the conservative newspaper Yeni Şafak. He became a research fellow at Kırklareli University and can speak fluent English and semi-fluent German.

== Journalism career ==
He worked as a columnist in Milat newspaper between 2011 and 2013 and in Yeni Şafak newspaper between 2013 and 2014. He generally wrote analyzes about daily Turkish politics. He gave support to dissidents in Syria, especially women and children rights in this period of civil war. He wrote many articles against the Fethullahist terror organization.

=== Solution-Peace Process ===
He wrote and supported articles contributing to the Solution-Peace Process within the framework of general human rights. These articles received negative reactions from ultra-nationalists people.

== Deputy Minister of Ministry of Youth and Sports ==
He became Deputy Minister of Ministry of Youth and Sports on 18 December 2015. He carried out important projects to encourage disabled athletes to sports during the period of Deputy Ministry of Youth and Sports. He focused on the importance of representation of Turkish Down syndrome and autistic athletes in Paralympics.

== Political career ==
=== Justice and Development Party ===
Boynukalın was appointed as the President of the Justice and Development Party Youth Wing in September 2014, formally taking over from the previous President Zafer Çubukcu on 12 October 2014 after he was appointed as an advisor to the Prime Minister of Turkey. Boynukalın became an AKP parliamentary candidate from Istanbul's 3rd electoral district and was elected at the June 2015 general election.

=== Raid on Hürriyet headquarters ===
On the evening of September 6, 2015, about 200 AKP supporters attacked the headquarters of the Doğan Media Center, where the headquarters of the Hürriyet newspaper is located. Mob threw stones at the beginning of the building's windows, and the former President of Turkey, AKP leader Recep Tayyip Erdogan condemned the news about the Freedom of expression had Boynukalın. After 16 Turkish soldiers were killed by Kurdistan Workers' Party (PKK) militants in Dağlıca, Erdoğan was heavily criticized, claiming that the attack would never have happened if the AKP had won 400 seats in the June 2015 general elections. However, Hürriyet newspaper later made an apology for the news. Boynukalin stated in the statement he made at that time that the protests had a democratic basis and that they had exceeded their purpose and apologized to the Hurriyet newspaper and argued that the reactions should be made on a democratic basis.

In the news written in that period, It also emerged that he was a critic of Mustafa Kemal Atatürk and had previously authored tweets in support for Abdullah Öcalan, the imprisoned leader of the PKK, on his Twitter account. After the attack, Hürriyet took Boynukalın to court for vandalism, threatening individuals in order to create panic and fear, breaking and entering, inciting others to commit a crime and attempting to limit freedoms. However, the prosecutor's office decided that there was no need to prosecute Boynukalın.

== Supporting the Al-Nusra Front ==
In a tweet on May 26, 2013, Boynukalın wished "God help Al-Nusra Front" and voiced his pleasure to see "Nusra's fame spreading" in another tweet on Aug. 7, as the al-Qaeda-linked group made gains in the war in Syria.

Praising the head of another group listed as a terrorist organization by both Turkey and the United Kingdom, Boynukalın had also posted positive tweets about Abdullah Ocalan, the PKK's jailed leader. On March 21, 2013, he tweeted Ocalan's latest message at the time had "moved" him.

== See also ==
- 25th Parliament of Turkey
