= Albayrak Group =

Turkish conglomerate

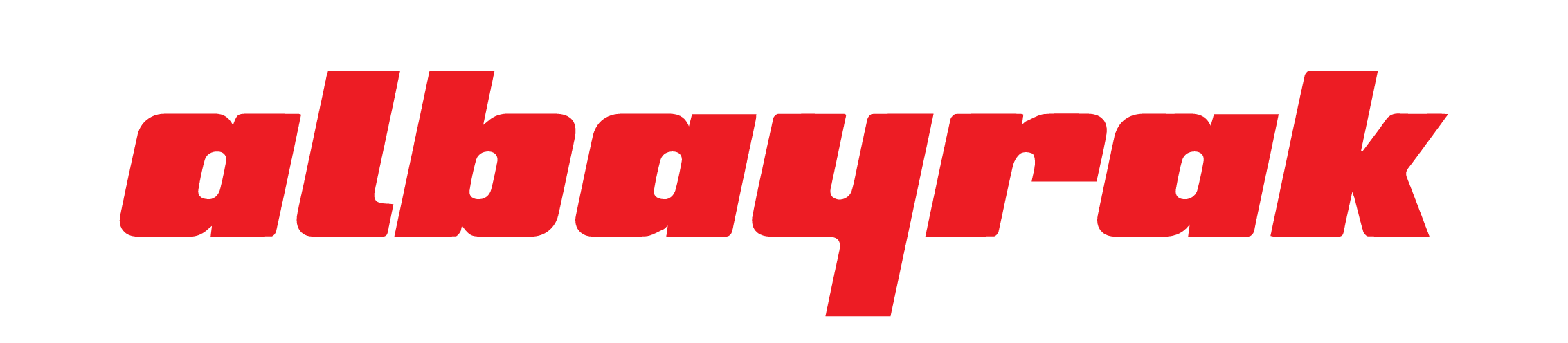
- Native name: Albayrak Medya Grubu
- Type: Private
- Industry: Construction, Port Investments, Manufacturing, Transportation, Agriculture, Tourism, Media
- Founded: 1952
- Founder: Ahmet Albayrak
- Headquarters: Zeytinburnu, Istanbul, Turkey
- Revenue: $1 billion (2008)
- Number of employees: 10,000
- Website: www.albayrak.com.tr

Albayrak Group is a Turkish multinational conglomerate based in Istanbul, Turkey. The group specializes in construction, port investments, manufacturing, media, transport, logistics, waste management, and tourism, managing approximately 80 brands. Since its founding in 1952, Albayrak Group has expanded into various industries globally.

== History ==
Albayrak Group is a joint venture by Ahmet Albayrak and his brothers Bayram Albayrak, Nuri Albayrak, Kazım Albayrak, Mustafa Albayrak, and Muzaffer Albayrak. The group kicked off commercial activities in 1952 in the construction industry upon initiatives by Hacı Ahmet Albayrak.

Albayrak Group traces its origins to Hacı Ahmet Albayrak, who contributed to rebuilding efforts after the 1939 Erzincan earthquake. Officially established in 1952 with the founding of Albayrak Construction, the company has since completed over 20,000 housing units, metro projects, hospitals, shopping malls, tunnels, administrative buildings, energy plants, and factories. The group remains 100% family-owned.

Albayrak Group operates across Turkey, West Africa, East Africa, Asia, and Europe. Key subsidiaries, including TÜMOSAN Engine and Tractor Factory (TMSN), Trabzon Port Management and Operations (TLMAN), and Platform Tourism Transportation Company (PLTUR), are listed on the Istanbul Stock Exchange (BIST).
