= Yeni Şafak =

Turkish daily newspaper

- Type: Daily newspaper
- Format: Berliner
- Owner: Albayrak Holding
- Founded: 1994
- Political alignment: Islamist; Pan-Islamist; Conservative
- Language: Turkish
- Headquarters: Zeytinburnu, Istanbul
- City: Istanbul
- Country: Turkey
- Circulation: 112,102 (November 2014)
- Website: www.yenisafak.com

Yeni Şafak ("New Dawn") is a conservative, Islamist Turkish daily newspaper. The newspaper is known for its hardline support of President Recep Tayyip Erdoğan and the AK Party and has very close relationship with the Turkish government. Together with other media organizations in Turkey, it has been accused of using hate speech to target minorities and opposition groups.

== History ==
Yeni Şafak's founding editor was Mehmet Ocaktan. In the beginning, the newspaper was known for harboring both liberal and Islamist columnists. In 1997, Yeni Şafak was acquired by Albayrak Holding, which had close ties with then mayor of Istanbul, Recep Tayyip Erdoğan. After İbrahim Karagül became the editor-in-chief of Yeni Şafak, the newspaper became a hardline supporter of then prime minister Erdoğan. More Islamist columnists were employed, while liberals like Kürşat Bumin were fired because of their critical views of Erdoğan and the AK Party.

== Controversies ==
=== Fabricated Noam Chomsky interview ===
On 26 August 2013 Noam Chomsky accused the pro-government Yeni Şafak newspaper of fabricating parts of an interview that was done with him via email, including inventing questions and answers and altering criticism of Erdoğan's approach to Egypt and Syria into an assertion that Turkey "stood with the oppressed people in Syria and Egypt". The administration of Yeni Şafak denied the accusation and promised to release the original English content of the emails. However, the released original was full of grammatical mistakes. Later it was found out that Yeni Şafak used Google Translate to translate fabricated Turkish content into English, and presented the translation as the original interview. After the grammatical errors, particularly "milk port", became a sensation on social media, Yeni Şafak finally admitted some parts were fabricated and removed the entire interview from its web site.

=== Disinformation during Gezi Protests ===
Yeni Şafak newspaper was a primary source of disinformation during 2013–14 protests in Turkey. According to a report published by Hrant Dink Foundation, Yeni Şafak was the primary newspaper generating hate speech against Gezi protesters.

PM Recep Tayyip Erdoğan said that they would release security camera footage to prove this had occurred. However, the imam of Dolmabahçe Mosque denied the paper's allegations and no footage was released to the public. Later, the imam (who is a state employee of the mosque) was transferred to a different city.

The paper also claimed a headscarved woman was attacked by a gang of shirtless protesters near Dolmabahce Mosque at a tram station on 1 June 2013. On 13 February 2014, several months after the protests had ended, security camera footage showed that there had been no attack on a woman wearing a headscarf by protesters on that date. The woman and Prime Minister Erdoğan had claimed in press conferences and political rallies that protesters had attacked her and her baby.

On 10 June Yeni Şafak claimed that a theatrical play called "Mi Minor," allegedly supported by an agency in the United Kingdom, had held rehearsals for a "revolution" in Turkey for months.

On 14 July Yeni Şafak published an article, titled "The Gezi Protestors' Horrible Plan for Istanbul," on their website that claimed that Gezi protesters were conspiring to undermine the government by wasting water from the reservoirs supplying Istanbul. After the article became the object of nationwide mockery, Yeni Şafak removed it from their website.

=== Other disinformation incidents ===
On 15 January 2016 Yeni Şafak published a video purportedly showing live audience members of the prime-time Beyaz Show talk show chanting slogans in support of outlawed Kurdish leader Abdullah Öcalan. British investigative news agency D8 News published a forensic analysis demonstrating that the audio track was modified before publication, adding voices sampled from an unrelated protest. The article also presented evidence that Yeni Şafak editors likely attempted to cover up their claims rather than issuing a formal retraction. The falsification incident was subsequently corroborated and covered by other news outlets in Turkey.

In 2021 retired professor and politician Mustafa Ozturk (Turkish: Mustafa Öztürk (politician born in 1953)), was quoted as an authority on the environment, as saying that there are no greenhouse gas emissions by Turkey.

=== Anti-Semitism ===
On 11 July 2014 Yeni Şafak columnists İbrahim Sancak and Yusuf Kaplan resorted to hate speech against Jews.

On 23 and 30 July 2014 Yeni Şafak columnist İbrahim Tenekeci resorted to hate speech against Jews and identified them as "eternal pain of humanity".

On 23 February 2026, İbrahim Karagül, the former editor-in-chief, published an article in which he described Jews as having "corrupted human genetics" and as a "race at war with all of humanity." He portrayed their statehood as a "seventy-year lie" through which they have created global control networks. He framed Israel and "the Jewish tribe" as a global existential threat, claiming they manipulate world events, finance, and conflicts to dominate humanity and alleging that they plan the destruction of entire nations and are "at war with the human race."

=== Anti-LGBT ===
On 6 June 2012 Yeni Şafak columnist A. Fuat Erdoğan identified homosexuality as perversion.

On 13 May 2013 Yeni Şafak columnist Yusuf Kaplan identified sexual identities other than heterosexuality as perversion.

=== Anti-Abortion ===
On 6 June 2012 Yeni Şafak columnist A. Fuat Erdoğan resorted to hate speech against pro-abortion women.

== Columnists ==
- Melih Bayram Dede
- Ali Bayramoğlu
- Yusuf Ziya Cömert
- Ali Murat Güven
- İbrahim Karagül
- Tamer Korkmaz
- Ömer Lekesiz
- Abdullah Muradoğlu
- Osman Tanburacı
- Salih Tuna
- Mehmet Şeker (yazar, 1961)
