= Visegrád Post =

Hungarian disinformation website, 2016–2024

- Website type: News outlet
- Available in: English, French, German
- Dissolved: 2024
- Headquarters: Budapest, Hungary
- Owner: Lalma Consulting Hungary Kft.
- Founder: Ferenc Almássy (born François Lavallou)
- Editor: Ferenc Almássy (editor-in-chief)
- Key people: Nicolas de Lamberterie, Olivier Bault, Sébastien Meuwissen, Yann Caspar, David Engels, Alimuddin Usmani, Bill Ravotti, Thibaud Gibelin, Gabriel Cruz
- Website: http://visegradpost.com
- Registration: No
- Launched: March 2016
- Current status: Domain repurposed

Visegrád Post was a multilingual online news platform founded in Budapest by Ferenc Almássy (born François Lavallou) and launched in March 2016, It published in English, French, and German on Central European politics and culture, focusing on the Visegrád Group. Positioning itself as a conservative voice for "mainstream" regional views emphasizing sovereignty and traditional values.

It has faced intense scrutiny over Russian ties, following allegations by security services that it was bankrolled by the sanctioned Voice of Europe network run by pro-Kremlin oligarch Viktor Medvedchuk.

Visegrád post was linked to Hungarian far-right Our Homeland Movement, Jobbik (formerly far-right) and neo-Nazi Pax Hungarica Movement, Russian separatists in Eastern Ukraine, and other far-right organizations, including Poland's Ordo Iuris and Law and Justice party circles, as well as French wing of Sixty-Four Counties Youth Movement, National Rally and Institut Iliade circles.

European intelligence, including Czech BIS, continues investigating it in 2025 for disinformation and hybrid threats.

Activities slowed at the start of 2024, with the final articles published by mid-year. In an interview at the end of 2024, Almássy mentioned that he had been living in Ethiopia since June.

In 2025, the Visegrád Post domain reportedly changed ownership, and a new outlet, run by the Israeli company ORMEDIA LTD, subsequently appeared. All information in this article are related to the period prior to this change.

== History ==
Ferenc Almássy, the founder of the Visegrád Post, was raised in France. His mother is Hungarian and father is French. After dropping out of university in Paris, he moved to Hungary in 2010 at the age of 22, where he began working for a multinational company. The idea emerged in the summer of 2015. With the help of a sponsor and following the establishment of a partnership with the French far-right and Russia linked web-based channel TV Libertés, the outlet was launched in late March 2016. On 2 September 2016, Almássy registered the company LALMA Consulting Hungary Kft., which was listed as the publisher ("editor").

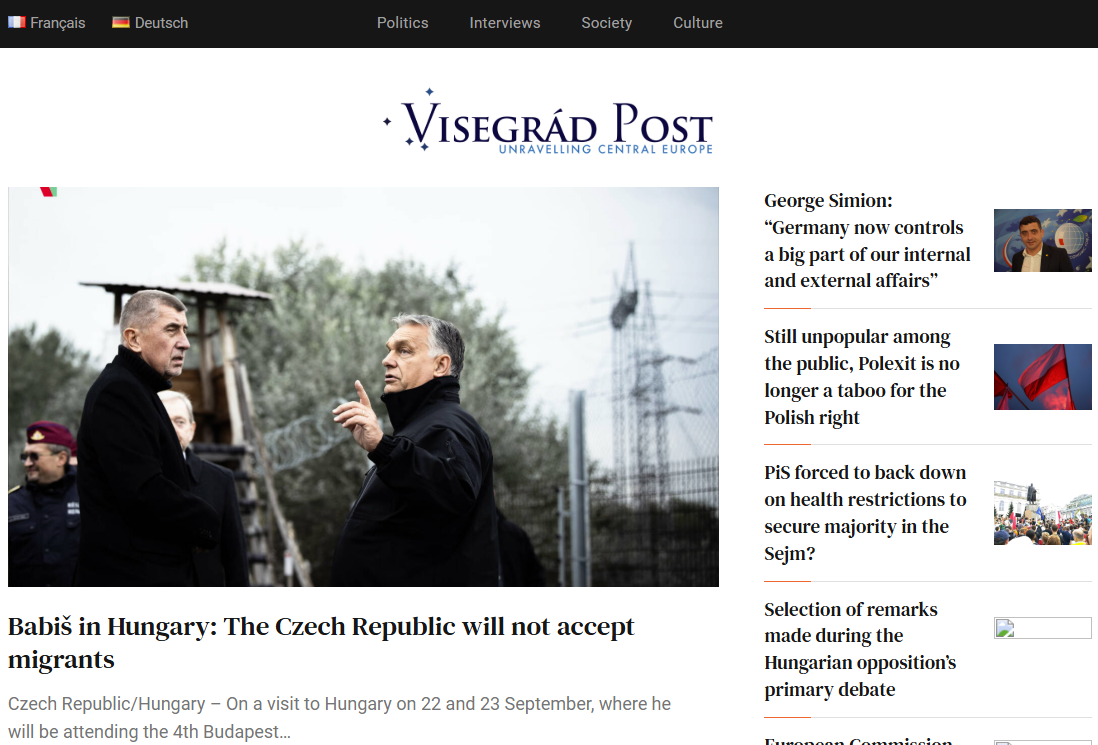
Screenshot from September 2021

In Hungary, Almássy has not only managed the Visegrád Post but has also contributed to TV Libertés and the weekly Magyar Demokrata and the daily Magyar Nemzet. Another connection to TV Libertés is Nicolas de Lamberterie, a French journalist and Central Europe correspondent for various media outlets, based in Budapest, who has played a prominent role in the Visegrád Post. Le Monde even describes him as a co-founder of the outlet and the Hungarian weekly HVG attributed him the management of the site along with Almássy.

TV Libertés was listed as the main partner of Visegrád Post. According to information provided on the website, it's partners also included Hungarian daily Magyar Nemzer, the Polish weekly Do Rzeczy, and the related portal Sovereignty.pl, the Kurier Plus website, owned by the state-owned Felczak Institute, and the Polish Economic Forum.

It published heavily ideologized content, including materials attacking LGBT+ communities and the European Union, supporting Viktor Orbán's government - considered the most pro-Russian in the EU - and even attacking pro-democratic politicians such as Donald Tusk. Over time, it has interviewed key political figures, including those associated with Hungary's Fidesz party and other far-right movements in Europe. In May 2018, they published an interview with Alexander Dugin about the Visegrad Group, authorized by Dugin's Geopolitika, where it was originally published.

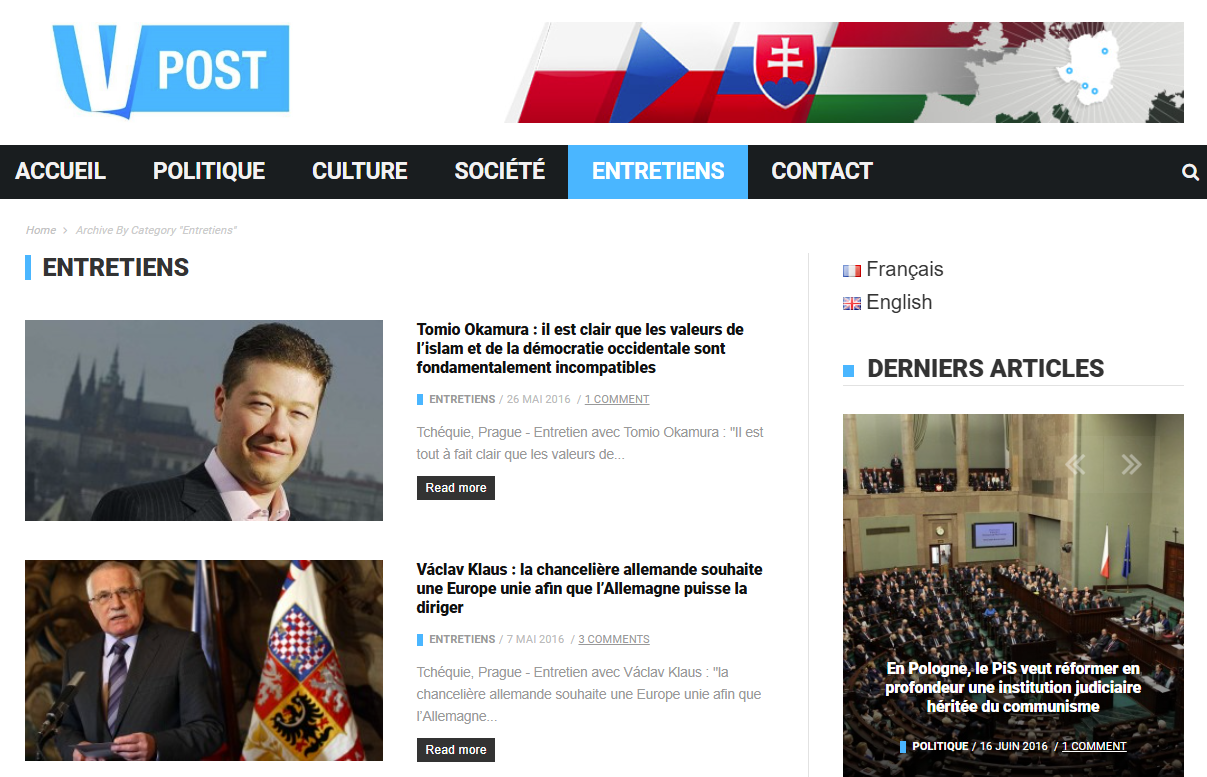
Screenshot from 2016, Interviews - Okumura, Klaus

Contributors have included journalists like Olivier Bault (based in Warsaw since the 1990s), Yann Caspar, Nicolas de Lamberterie, David Engels, Sébastien Meuwissen, Thibaud Gibelin, Bill Ravotti, Gabriel Cruz (a UK-based writer), and Alimuddin Usmani (a Swiss journalist of Czech-Pakistani origin who has conducted numerous interviews with Czech politicians and frequently visited Prague).

In early 2017, Almássy said he was the editor-in-chief and the outlet's only full-time employee, earning €500-600 a month. At the time, the average monthly wage in Hungary was about €962 and €1,221 in Budapest. The outlet did not operate on a subscription basis and carried no advertising, meaning it had no income from advertising either. Although Almássy claimed at least since 2019 that the outlet was "financed exclusively through donations", findings confirmed that it nonetheless benefited from subsidies drawn from Hungarian public funds. In 2018, he successfully applied for a grant from the National Cultural Fund (NKA) for the further development of the Visegrád Post project.

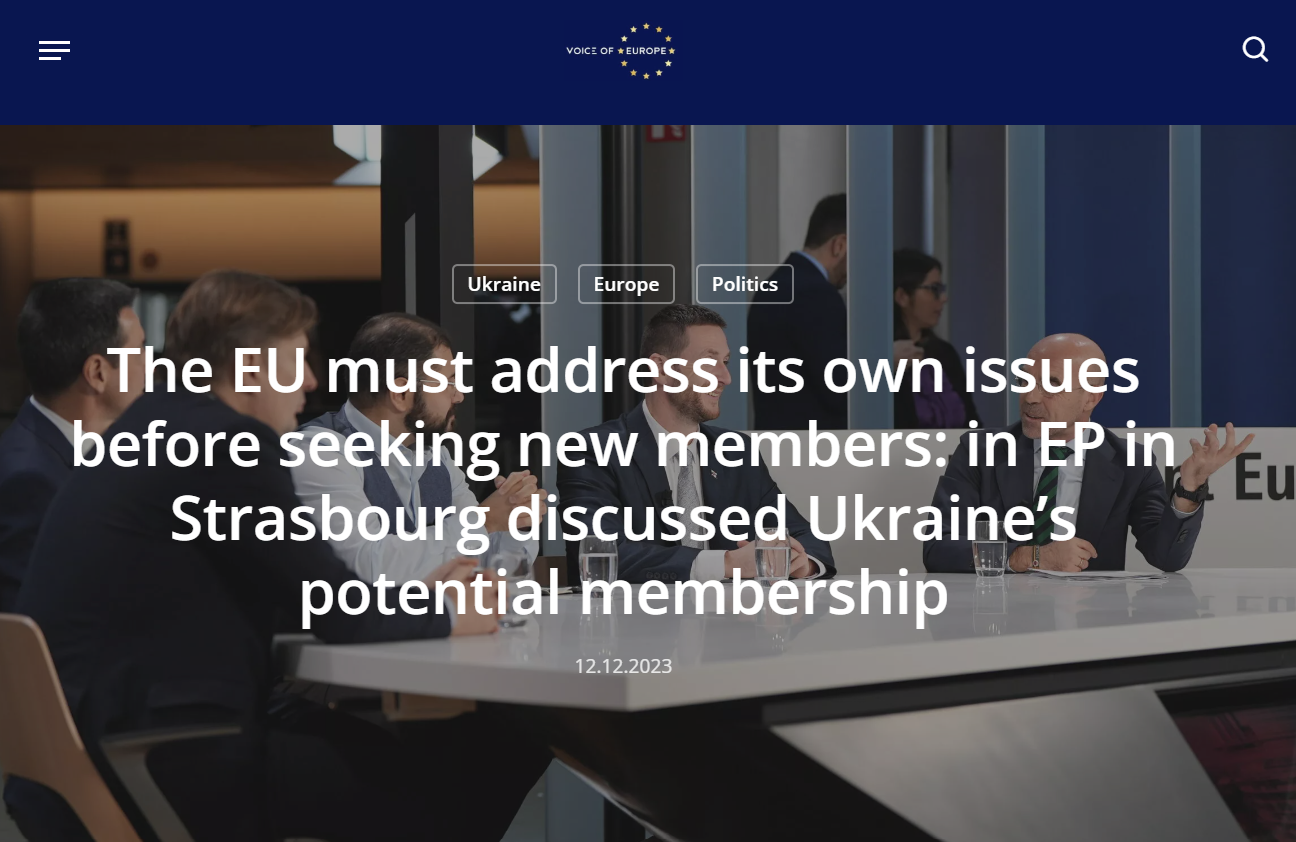
A Voice of Europe discussion moderated by Ferenc Almássy and featuring Maximilian Krah, Ladislav Ilčić, Milan Uhrík, and Jorge Buxadé published on 12 December 2023.

In December 2023, Almássy moderated a discussion for Voice of Europe featuring Maximilian Krah, Jorge Buxadé, Milan Uhrík and Ladislav Ilčić. The discussion was published under the headline "Possible Ukraine's EU accession - propaganda: MEPs discussed potential risks." Although the video is no longer available, Hungarian weekly HVG archived screenshots and the corresponding YouTube and outlet page was also preserved in the web archive. This demonstrates Almássy's direct connection to Voice of Europe.

Publication of articles and activity on social media accounts quieted down at the end of December 2023, although some new content continued to appear sporadically during the first half of 2024. In an interview with Hungarian Conservative published on 31 December 2024, Almássy told Álvaro Peñas that he had been living in Ethiopia since June and that he had "dramatically changed his life this year by joining the French Catholic NGO SOS Chrétiens d'Orient to help Christians in need."

In 2025, the Visegrád Post domain reportedly changed hands, and a new outlet subsequently emerged, operated by the Israeli Tel Aviv-Yafo–based company ORMEDIA LTD. One continuing link is Gabriel Cruz, a UK-based writer who has contributed to the outlet since its founding in 2016 and remains listed as a member of the editorial team, with his articles from 2016 onwards still accessible.

On 6 June 2025, Almássy posted a review comment on the newly created Visegrád Post Facebook page associated with the new domain owner: "They have stolen a brand to make a AI generated piece of s***. Garbage."

== Background in Hungary and links to the Hungarian government ==
The Visegrád Post new media outlet and its key figures maintained intensive relations with Hungary's pro-government media ecosystem and political structures, while also receiving direct state financial support. Although the outlet presents itself as an independent Christian-conservative voice of the Visegrád Group region, investigative journalism and intelligence services point to its role in spreading Hungarian government narratives toward foreign audiences.

=== State funding ===
Although the portal officially claimed that its operations were funded by reader donations, analyses have proven direct financial support from Hungarian public sources. In 2019–2020, the company Lalma Consulting Hungary Kft., owned by the outlet's founder Almássy, received a grant of 4 million forints (about 12,300 euros in 2019) from the National Cultural Fund (NKA). These funds were allocated directly from the special budget framework of then Minister of Human Resources Miklós Kásler, designated for the "further development" of the foreign-language portal.

=== Editorial orientation and government involvement ===
In its reporting on Hungary, Visegrád Post relies almost exclusively on pro-government information sources. The most frequently cited media include Mandiner, Magyar Nemzet, the state news agency MTI, and public broadcasters such as M1 and Híradó. The portal functioned as a platform that conducted or republished interviews in English, French, and German with senior representatives and key figures of the ruling Fidesz party. Among those were interviews with:

- Viktor Orbán, Prime Minister;
- Katalin Novák, former President of Hungary;
- Judit Varga, former Minister of Justice;
- László Kövér, Speaker of Parliament;
- Zoltán Kovács, State Secretary for Government Communication;
- Tristan Azbej, State Secretary for the Aid of Persecuted Christians;
- András Gyürk, Fidész MEP;
- András Bencsik and László Bogár, journalists associated with Fidész.

According to critics, the portal's goal is to create the impression abroad that political and social developments in Central Europe are evolving optimally in line with government priorities.

=== Media presence of key figures ===
The portal's founder Ferenc Almássy and key contributor Nicolas de Lamberterie frequently appear on Hungarian pro-government television channels, particularly news channel Hír TV (and previously the now-defunct Echo TV). Almássy has appeared in these media at least 16 times, presenting himself as an expert on French politics or the war in Ukraine. In addition, Almássy contributes as a writer to pro-government weekly Magyar Demokrata and daily Magyar Nemzet. Before the European Union banned broadcasting of the Russian state television Russia Today (RT), Almássy was also a regular guest of its French service, where he defended Hungarian government policies.

=== Connections to extremist groups ===
In addition to ties with the ruling Fidesz party, leading figures of the portal are also close to the Hungarian far-right, specifically the Mi Hazánk party. Nicolas de Lamberterie, who has a past in extremist movements, for example, Sixty-Four countries Youth Movement (HVIM) founded by László Toroczkai in 2001, writes for the party newspaper Magyar Jelen. Mi Hazánk leader László Toroczkai cooperated with the Visegrád Post and participated in conferences it organized. Visegrád Post also conducted interviews with him in 2017 and 2023. Investigative reports highlight Toroczkai's indirect GRU link through a 2016 ceremony with a Russian spy, contextualized within his extremist movement's pro-Russian activities like anti-Ukraine rhetoric. In July 2020, Visegrád Post conducted and published an interview with Péter Jakab, who was at the time the president of Jobbik. He resigned from the party leadership in 2022 following a series of scandals and internal disputes, and had previously faced criticism for antisemitic statements.

== International ties ==
=== France ===
TV Libertés, the founding and main partner of Visegrád Post, was an channel known for disseminating pro-Russian narratives, established earlier in January 2014 by a group led by Philippe Milliau (president) and former Front National figure Martial Bild (editor-in-chief). TV Libertés had engaged in coverage of developments in Eastern Ukraine, including the elections in Donetsk and Luhansk. In September 2014. At the time, TV Libertés accompanied the French "fake election observer" Jean-Luc Schaffhauser, for whom Nicolas de Lamberterie worked as an assistant during his term as a Member of the European Parliament (MEP 2014–2019). Schaffhauser also played a central role in arranging a 9.4 million euro loan from the Moscow-linked First Czech Russian Bank (FCRB) to Marine Le Pen's Front National in 2014. TV Libertés was also the only television channel permitted to cover a meeting with State Duma Chairman Sergey Naryshkin, held at the Russian Embassy in Paris and organized by the French-Russian Dialogue Association, which was co-chaired by Thierry Mariani and Vladimir Yakunin.

TV Libertés originated from the Notre Antenne TV project, which was initiated by Gilles Arnaud, who headed a network of several closely aligned media and the association Groupe EDH Communication, in collaboration with Philippe Milliau, involved in Bloc Identitaire, after its split co-founder of Réseau Identités, and one of the main contributors to a French version of Voice of Russia. Notre Antenne was directly financed by Russia. Few weeks before, Arnaud also founded ProRussia.TV, an web based online video platform, for which he secured a total of €415,000 thanks to Russia's Ambassador to France Aleksandr Orlov, who is active in this direction in France to this day. ProRussia.TV became another arm of Groupe EDH Communication, developed with Agence2Presse, ITAR-TASS, Interfax, Voice of Russia, and Iran's Mehr News Agency.

The Notre Antenne project received support from prominent figures within the French far right, including Jean-Yves Le Gallou, president of Polémia and a frequent participant in pro-Russian media, and Yvan Blot, co-founder (with Le Gallou) and president of Club de l'Horloge. Blot also served as a consultant for the Russian state broadcaster Voice of Russia in Paris, acted as an expert for the International Analytical Center Rethinking Russia, established in 2015 with headquarters in Moscow, was a member of the Valdai Club, and authored La Russie de Poutine (Putin's Russia) in 2015. Both individuals were also involved in the founding of TV Libertés.

Visegrád Post has conducted several interviews with prominent French far-right politicians. In December 2019, it interviewed Éric Zemmour, and in October 2021 it spoke with Marion Maréchal, was close associate of him. She is the granddaughter of Jean-Marie Le Pen and the niece of Marine Le Pen. Maréchal later became a vice-president of Zemmour's party Reconquête, alongside Guillaume Peltier and Nicolas Bay, after Zemmour founded the party in 2022. Few weeks before the interview, Maréchal had appeared with Zemmour at the Demographic Summit in Budapest in September 2021, where she openly expressed support for him.

Maréchal leads the political training school ISSEP, which is a partner of Collegium Intermarium, together with Mathias Corvinus Collegium (MCC) and St. Petersburg State University (until at least June 2025). She personally attended the inaugural conference of Collegium Intermarium in Poland, an institution founded by Ordo Iuris, where Olivier Bault interviewed her. ISSEP was inspired by and modeled on the Institut de Formation Politique founded by Alexandre Pesey, and it is also close to Academia Christiana.

Among the organizations cooperating with Academia Christiana, alongside ISSEP, are TV Libertés, the Iliade Institute, the Institut de Formation Politique, and SOS Chrétiens d'Orient (SOSCO), where Almássy began working after Visegrád Post ceased its activities. SOSCO, a French NGO aiding persecuted Christians in the Middle East, has been accused of funding pro-Assad militias in Syria implicated in war crimes, leading to a 2025 anti-terrorism raid on its offices by French authorities. The organization is also criticized for its ties to French far-right, including staff with connections to extremist groups like Génération Identitaire (Generation Identity).

Other interviewed politicians included François-Xavier Bellamy, currently a Member of the European Parliament, vice-president of the EPP group, and executive vice-president of Les Républicains, as well as identarian politician Karim Ouchikh, founder and president of the extra-parliamentary party SIEL.

Visegrád Post has also interviewed other French figures linked to Russian influence activities and pro-Russian positions, including Henri Malosse, Nikola Mirković. and Grégor Puppinck.

Henri Malosse is a French lobbyist who also appeared on Voice of Europe and was identified by a T-Online investigation as part of Viktor Medvedchuk's European influence network. From 2019 onward, he helped Medvedchuk build political ties, accompanying him on PR trips to the French National Assembly and the German Bundestag in 2019–2020. Malosse also met Medvedchuk in Kyiv in 2021 and regularly invited his associates to panels at his Brussels-based think tank, Vocal Europe. The investigation also noted his connections to Viktor Orbán's government. Malosse is also involved in the Clementy Schuman Legacy Foundation (known as the Clementy Foundation), which, through its head Pierre Louvrier, has links to sanctioned Russian oligarch Konstantin Malofeev.

Malosse has also been described in investigations as a key figure in the long-term Indian influence operation known as Indian Chronicles, which ran for 15 years and sought to promote Indian interests while creating an image of EU support. This included organizing trips with European right-wing politicians to Bangladesh, Kashmir, and the Maldives. He regularly contributed to media outlets created within this operation and recorded videos for EU Chronicle, including messages congratulating Prime Minister Narendra Modi on his birthday and on India's Independence Day.

Nikola Mirkovic has appeared several times as a commentator and analyst on Russian state-controlled media. Through his organization Association Ouest-Est (Association West-East), he has delivered aid to Russian-occupied territories and met figures such as the leader of self-proclaimed Donetsk People's Republic (DPR) Denis Pushilin and Alexander Zaldostanov, friend of Vladimir Putin and the leader of the pro-Putin Night Wolves. Mirkovic also observed the presidential election in DPR.

A few days before the interview, on 1 April 2017, Mirkovic took part in the conference L'Occident contre l'Europe (The West Against Europe) in Paris, organized by the Société Française de Démographie (Sofrade). His Association West-East was among the partners. It appears the conference was also the regional conference of the World Congress of Families. According to reinformation.tv, the event functioned as a platform for Russian influence and ideological propaganda, promoting anti-Western narratives and portraying Putin's Russia as the defender of traditional values against Western decline. The conference was described as influenced by the ideas of Alexander Dugin and by oligarch Konstantin Malofeev. Other participants included Alexey Komov, Fabrice Sorlin, Xavier Moreau, Brian Brown, John Laughland, Philippe Migault, Levan Vassadzé, Guillaume de Thieulloy, Jacques Hogard, Pierre Gentillet, and Yannick Jaffré.

Grégor Puppinck shared publicly his warm thoughts about Putin.In 2014, amid Russia's annexation of Crimea, Puppinck joined a 2014 Moscow delegation by La Manif Pour Tous, meeting parliamentarians and Orthodox officials to collaborate on traditional values against same-sex marriage, praising Russia's "moral" laws. He links to Kremlin ally Konstantin Malofeev, funded anti-LGBTQ+ efforts, and was listed for the 2014 Moscow World Congress of Families. Via ECLJ's ACLJ parent, over $3.3 million transferred since 2007 to Russian SCLJ, influencing the 2013 "gay propaganda" ban under Putin's Human Rights Council.

Puppinck helped co-organize an anti-abortion symposium in Moscow in July 2015 as part of the Moscow Pro-Life Festival. He appeared alongside key Russian organizers, including Sergei Chesnokov, with strong involvement from the Russian Orthodox Church. The event was featured senior church figures such as Archpriest Dmitri Smirnov, whose participation was blessed by Patriarch Kirill. It condemned abortion as "prenatal infanticide," called for a full ban, and its resolution was submitted to the Russian government.

Puppinck was incolved in Agenda Europe, worked closely not only with Ordo Iuris but also with organizations close to Viktor Orbán's government. Even the interview for Visegrád Post in March 2023 "was conducted in collaboration with Institute Ordo Iuris."

=== Poland ===
Social media presence of Visegrád Post, particularly on X, heavily focused on Poland, frequently reposting content from Sovereignty.pl, a website publishing English-language articles from the Polish weekly Do Rzeczy.

The outlet published signed articles by contributors such as Olivier Bault, a French journalist long based in Poland and associated with Do Rzeczy. Bault's work for the Visegrád Post often highlighted anti-European Union and anti-immigration perspectives, framing Poland and Hungary as defenders of Christian identity. Since March 2024, Bault has served as director of communications at Ordo Iuris. Another contributor, Sebastian Meuwissen, of Polish-Belgian descent, has ties to Ordo Iuris and is employed at Alapjogokért Központ (Center for Fundamental Rights), a Hungarian government-aligned institution supporting figures in the Law and Justice government, including Marcin Romanowski, who is currently facing legal prosecution in Hungary.

The Visegrád Post website frequently referenced Ordo Iuris, Poland's conservative legal organization, appearing in at least eight articles. Jerzy Kwaśniewski, Ordo Iuris's president, is cited in coverage of the 2022 Hungarian elections, where he served as an observer. The Visegrád Post also interviewed several prominent Ordo Iuris figures, including Jerzy Kwaśniewski, Katarzyna Gęsiak, Tymoteusz Zych, and Arkadiusz Robaczewski, the Rector of Plenipotentiary for Programs and Science at Collegium Intermarium university founded by Ordo Iuris and close associate of Tadeusz Rydzyk.

The outlet's network extends to broader conservative and transnational engagements. On May 20, 2022, the Visegrád Post's X account reported a meeting with Jerzy Kwaśniewski at the Hungarian edition of CPAC. Bault, highly regarded within Ordo Iuris, attended meetings with the Polish Patriots for Europe delegation, including Kwaśniewski and lawyer Bartosz Lewandowski, discussing alleged breaches of the rule of law in Poland. In September 2024, Bault represented Ordo Iuris at a media event in the United States during President Karol Nawrocki's visit to Washington, organized by TV Republika.

Visegrád Post listed several Polish partners, including the Do Rzeczy, its associated portal Sovereignty.pl, Kurier Plus, linked to the state-owned Wacław Felczak Institute for Polish-Hungarian Cooperation, and the Forum Ekonomiczne (Economic Forum). Evidence showed mutual listings as media partners on their websites from at least 2021 to 2023.

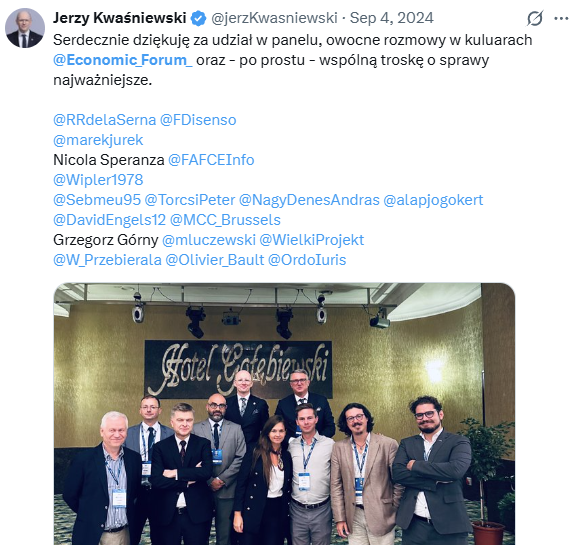
Forum Ekonomiczne 2024 - Marek Jurek (interview), Olivier Bault (contributor), Grzegorz Górny, Ricardo Ruiz de la Serna, Jerzy Kwaśniewski (interview), Weronika Przebierała, Przemysław Wipler, Sébastien Meuwissen (contributor), David Engels (contributor), Dénes András Nagy

Almássy actively participated in the Forum Ekonomiczne as a panelist in the 2021 discussion "Youth on the Future of Europe" (moderated by Visegrád Post collaborator Sebastien Meuwissen), as moderator of the 2022 debate "The Role of Local Governments in Building Social Capital" and in 2023.

In 2021, the Forum Ekonomiczne, which was attended by the Morawiecki government and Law and Justice top brass, also invited Vladimir Sergienko, a Russian figure suspected of espionage for Russia and known for pro-Kremlin propaganda on Russian media like Vesti radio and appearances with Vladimir Solovyov. Russian GRU agent Pavel Rubtsov (aka Pablo Gonzáles), who had repeatedly participated in the Forum Ekonomiczne, and Yury Voskresensky, who works for the Belarusian KGB, were also present.

Almássy also contributed extensively to another web-based outlet, Deliberatio. This platform was operated by the Polish foundation Fundacja Twórców Dla Rzeczypospolitej (lit. 'Creators for the Republic Foundation'), whose president is Zdzisław Krasnodębski, and it also features other individuals with ties to Law and Justice, including David Engels, who was also involved with Visegrád Post. The site was apparently managed by Spanish journalist Álvaro Peñas, who is the only person mentioned as editor, who also contributes to The European Conservative, international outlet associated with Fidész and he was involved in several major events with a strong ideological or political focus, such as MCC Feszt 2023. French journalist Patrick Édery, married to a Pole and living in Poland, editor for the portal Tysol and the weekly Solidarność, whom Visegrád Post interviewed in March 2021, was also a frequent contributor to Deliberatio outlet.

Sovereignty.pl, another partner of Visegrád post, was established by the Fundacja Instytut Suwerenności i Dziedzictwa w Europie (lit. 'Foundation Institute of Sovereignty and Heritage in Europe'), a team largely composed of Do Rzeczy staff, including editor-in-chief Paweł Lisicki and his deputy Piotr Gabryel. Do Rzeczy has consistently criticized Poland's support for Ukraine and progressive trends in the Catholic Church, while also expressing sympathy for the ideas of Alexander Dugin, a prominent Kremlin ideologist.

The Instytut Współpracy Polsko-Węgierskiej im. Wacława Felczaka (Wacław Felczak Institute for Polish-Hungarian Cooperation) operates the affiliated online platform Kurier Plus.The reports noted that articles from Kurier Plus were regularly reprinted on Visegrád Post, extending the visibility of content on Central European politics, Hungarian-Polish relations, and conservative perspectives. Additionally, Maciej Szymanowski, that time director of the Felczak Institute, collaborated on interviews and articles published on Visegrád Post, covering topics including EU policies, gender ideology, and regional sovereignty, frequently in conjunction with figures like Paweł Lisicki from Do Rzeczy. Visegrád also promoted the activities of the Felczak Institute.

Visegrád Post conducted or published several interviews also with prominent Law and Justice politicians including Wojciech Murdzek, Marek Kuchciński, Jacek Saryusz-Wolski (twice), and Ryszard Terlecki.

=== Czechia ===
One of the key links between the outlet and Czechia was Alimuddin Usmani, a Swiss journalist of Czech-Pakistani origin. Usmani regularly visited Prague and conducted interviews with Czech politicians for Visegrád Post. His texts were often repurposed from other platforms, such as the Le Pravda website. Other key figures, such as Almássy and Nicolas de Lamberterie participated in building contacts in Czechia as well.

In 2018, Visegrád Post attempted to establish collaboration with the think tank Pravý břeh (lit. 'Right Bank'), which is closely associated with Czech ODS party. In the materials for the 2018 application for a state subsidy from the National Cultural Fund (NKA), Almássy listed the Pravý břeh as a partner. Almássy contacted editor Petr Dvořák and republished three articles. According to the institute's chairman František Mikš, the collaboration was not pursued further because they did not align ideologically - Almássy focused on culture wars and nationalism.

Another connection with Czechia manifested through Nicolas de Lamberterie. In August 2023, he invited representatives of the Czech SPD party (specifically, SPD institute director Josef Nerušil) to a conference in the Hungarian parliament, organized by the Hungarian far-right party Mi Hazánk (Our Homeland) led by László Toroczkai. Nerušil confirmed that de Lamberterie introduced himself as a collaborator of the party. The conference was also attended by other pro-Russian politicians, such as Thierry Baudet from the Netherlands, who also collaborated with Voice of Europe or Kostadin Kostadinov from Bulgaria. Toroczkai admitted that de Lamberterie invited politicians at his request, but denied deeper collaboration.

In 2016, Visegrád Post republished an interview from Le Pravda with Tomio Okamura, leader of SPD party, in where he called Islamic values incompatible with Western democracy. In 2021, Usmani interviewed his college Tereza Hyťhová (SPD, later Trikolora) in her Ústí nad Labem office. She touted Visegrád Group as the future amid potential EU collapse.

In July 2019, Almássy and Usmani interviewed Vojtěch Filip, paid collaborator of the former Czechoslovak communism era secret services (StB), then Deputy Speaker in Parliament, KSČM leader, about Andrej Babiš's government and migration. Kateřina Konečná, Filip's successor, gave an interview to Usmani that was originally published in Le Pravda in April 2016.

In October 2019, Polish journalists Maciej Szymanowski and Paweł Lisicki interviewed Cardinal Dominik Duka on gender ideology's threat to families.

Václav Klaus's interviews and texts were frequently republished since the outlet's early days. Later, for example, they also published his speech from Hungarian CPAC 2022 and an editorial titled "Realistically about the Tragic Situation in Ukraine," written by him and submitted to the Visegrád Post by the Václav Klaus Institute. In this 22 March 2022 editorial, Klaus framed the Russia-Ukraine war not as a straightforward act of Russian aggression but as a tragic escalation of a long-standing geopolitical confrontation between the West (led by the United States) and Russia, with Ukraine portrayed as an unwitting pawn in a "delayed match" of the Cold War. "Since the Maidan in 2014, Ukraine, or rather Ukrainian politicians, have opted for a confrontation with Russia," he wrote.

=== Slovakia ===
Its links to Slovakia are relatively weak compared with the other V4 countries. It lacks specialized coverage and political interviews. After Robert Fico, who had been frequently highlighted by Visegrád Post, moved into opposition following the 2020 parliamentary election, the publication shifted to fairly standard news reporting about Slovakia.

In the materials for the 2018 application for a state subsidy from the National Cultural Fund (NKA), Almássy listed the Anton Tunega Foundation as a partner. An article also appeared in which Marek Degro, who at that time served as the director of the foundation, is explicitly listed as its author. Later, his name was removed from the article. The foundation was founded by Ján Figeľ, who is still the chairman of its board. At the time, the board included MEP Miriam Lexmann and Roger Kiska, who had previously worked for ADF International. Figeľ cooperates with ADF and is an active member of the Clementy Schuman Legacy Foundation, led by Pierre Louvrier, who has ties to sanctioned Russian oligarch Konstantin Malofeev.

In 2024, the foundation held "secret" peace negotiations with representatives of the Russian Federation. Another key figure involved in the foundation is Henri Malosse, with whom Visegrád Post journalist Yann Casper conducted an interview in June 2021. Malosse has connections to Viktor Medvedchuk's European network and, like Figeľ, is linked to far-right and pro-Russian circles, including Ordo Iuris and MCC.

In December 2021, Almássy conducted an interview with Ľubomír Urbančok, a priest ordained in 2018. He is known for his extensive contributions to the conspiratorial and pro-Russian outlet Christianitas, which has also been criticized by the Catholic Church. The portal regularly attacked Pope Francis, praises conservative bishops such as Raymond Burke and Carlo Maria Viganò, and opposed COVID-19 vaccination during the pandemic. Urbančok spreads similar content through his social media channels as well. He is among the few supporters and promoters of the Latin Mass in Slovakia.

The editor-in-chief of Christianitas is Branislav Michalka, who has long-standing ties to conspiracy media and has for years defended and promoted Jozef Tiso, the president of the WW2 fascist Slovak republic.

The publisher is the Slovakia Christiana Foundation, which Michalka also headed for a period of time. It was established by the Polish Fundacja Instytut Edukacji Społecznej i Religijnej im. ks. P. Skargi (founded in 2013 and a sponsor of Ordo Iuris) and is part of the European TFP network Fédération Pro Europa Christiana headquartered in France.

== Associated projects and activities ==
=== Book Viktor Orbán - Twelve Years in Power ===
In 2022, a collective of authors writing under the name Visegrád Post authored the French-language book Viktor Orbán - douze ans au pouvoir (lit. 'Viktor Orbán - Twelve Years in Power'), which examines twelve years of Viktor Orbán's tenure in office. According to an interview conducted by Almássy with French outlet Breizh-Info founder Yann Vallerie in connection with the publication, contributors to the book included Ferenc Almássy, Olivier Bault, Yann Caspar, David Engels, Thibaud Gibelin, Nicolas de Lamberterie, Gábor Stier, and Árpád Szakács. The foreword was written by Almássy.
