= Magyar Sziget =

Hungarian nationalist festival

- Begins: Summer
- Frequency: Annual
- Locations: Verőce, Velence, Ásotthalom
- Country: Hungary
- Years active: 2001-2022
- Inaugurated: 2001
- Founder: László Toroczkai
- Most recent: 2022
- Organiser: HVIM
- Website: https://magyarsziget.hu/

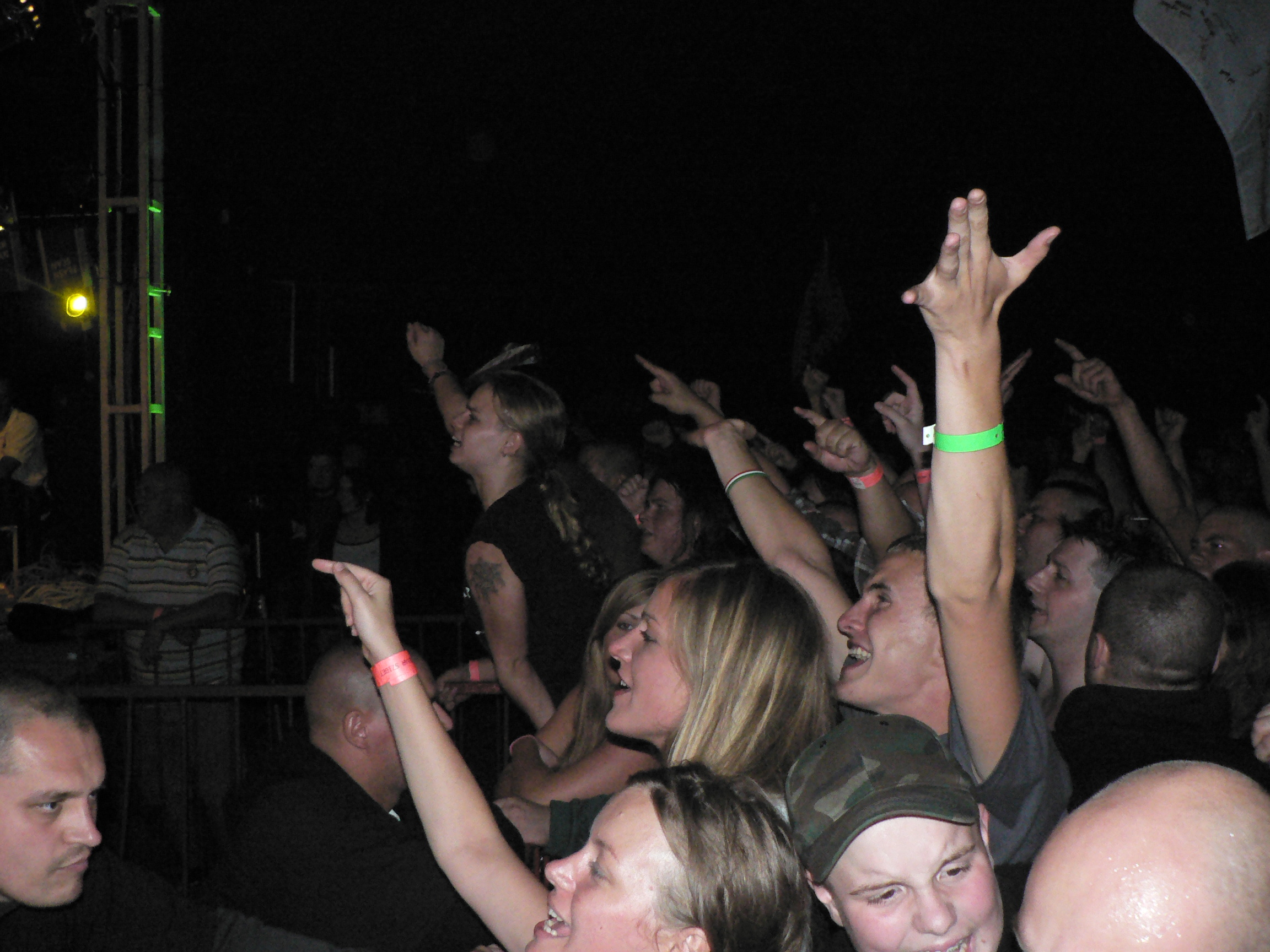

The Magyar Sziget festival (Hungarian pronunciation: [ˈmɒɟɒr ˈsiɡɛt], Hungarian Island) was a far-right, nationalist cultural and music festival in Hungary, organized by Sixty-Four Counties Youth Movement (HVIM) under the leadership of László Toroczkai (currently the leader of the far-right Our Homeland Movement party).

From 2001 to 2013, the festival was held in Verőce. In 2014, it was moved to Velence. In 2019, the festival was moved to Ásotthalom, where Toroczkai serves as Mayor. The last Magyar Sziget was held in 2022, since then the festival has been on hiatus.

The festival's name is an example of the feeling of isolation of Hungary. It can be seen as a metaphor for the 'island' of Hungary within a sea of non-Finno-Ugric languages. The festival is not to be confused with the 'normal' Hungarian Sziget festival.

== Organisation ==
Although the festival is organised by a nationalist and irredential movement, it does not solely feature nationalist bands. 'Normal' Hungarian (rock)bands are booked for the festival as well, and cultural demonstrations are part of the program.

In 2001 Toroczkai started the festival as a summer camp for his youth movement. At that point, the name was still 'Grand National Youth Meeting'. The next year, this name would be changed to Magyar Sziget. Reinforcing the national identity amongst participants was one of the goals of the festival, and thus the inspiration for the new name. Although the festival started off as a week-long event, it has since been shortened to just two days in more recent years. Magyar Sziget changes every year, but the Hungarian bands and cultural activities that support Hungarian heritage remain the main focus.

In recent years the festival was downsized, but alternative festivals have been organised as well. The organisers have set up an 'Uplands Hungarian Island' (Felvidéki Magyar Sziget) festival in Slovakia in some years. There is a Székely Sziget (in Romania) and a summer camp for children, Nemzeti Gyerektábor ('National Childrenscamp') as well. Organiser Toroczkai has referred to the 'normal' Sziget festival in Budapest as an "anti-Hungarian event". In a Dutch newspaper, he described his own Magyar Sziget as "our island in a multi-ethnic, globalising world". The Magyar Sziget festival is supposedly organised to counter the 'international' character of Sziget.

=== Foreign visitors ===
In part due to the nationalist shows, the festival does attract foreign visitors, even though it targets Hungarians as an audience. In 2012 members of Voorpost attended Magyar Sziget. Other nationalist organisations are present as well. A member of the British National Party visited the festival grounds, but was promptly banned as a member of his party.

== Reputation ==
The festival is known as nationalist and partly far-right. Despite that reputation, it is not known to have had any particular disturbances. A Dutch reporter noted it as being a well-organised family event. During the first festival in 2002 attendees helped the citizens of Verőce with flood works to protect their town.
