= György Gyula Zagyva =

Hungarian politician

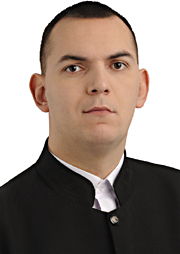
- Zagyva in 2010

Personal details
- Born: May 18, 1976 (age 49) Eger, Hungary
- Party: MIÉP (1999–2001); Non-partisan (2001–)
- Occupation: Politician

György Gyula Zagyva (born 18 May 1976) is a Hungarian politician and former member of the National Assembly of Hungary between 2010 and 2014. He is also the co-leader of the Sixty-Four Counties Youth Movement, a Hungarian far-right youth organization.

Previously, he was struck again and again as disseminators of right-wing ideas and attacks against minorities in Hungary. In 2002 Zagyva learned to know the 64 counties, since 2003, he was vice president. In 2006 he took over the leadership of László Toroczkai, which still remained honorary president of the organization until he created a new movement in 2018.

Since 2009, it is him and several other members of the 64 counties for two years forbidden to enter Serbian territory. This was due to their activities in Vojvodina, a Serbian province, home to many Hungarians. The organization had called on the Hungarian minority to oppose Serbia and Hungarian children sent to school supplies.
