= Voice of Europe =

Russian state-backed media outlet

- Website type: News outlet
- Available in: English
- Headquarters: Dronten (2016-2019); Prague (2023-2024), Netherlands (2016-2019); Czech Republic (2023-)
- Country of origin: Netherlands
- Owners: Three Dutch individuals including Erik de Vlieger (2016-2019); Jacek January Jakubczyk (formal, 2019-)
- Founder: Erik de Vlieger
- Key people: Erik de Vlieger, Viktor Medvedchuk, Artem Marchevsky
- Website: voiceofeurope.com
- Launched: 2016; May 2023 (relaunch)
- Current status: Sanctioned in EU

Voice of Europe was a pro-Russian disinformation outlet and influence operation, originally established as an anti-immigration site in the Netherlands in 2016 by investors including Erik de Vlieger before going offline in 2019 and relaunching in May 2023 in Prague, Czech Republic.

After the relaunch, it was directed by Ukrainian oligarch Viktor Medvedchuk through associate Artem Marchevskyi and disseminated propaganda to undermine support for Ukraine and sway European elections by promoting Eurosceptic and far-right views. Early in its 2023 relaunch phase, the operation expanded activities into Belgium, using it as a key hub for meetings, payments, and influencing politicians near EU institutions. In 2024, Czech intelligence Service (BIS) exposed it as a Russian-financed network suspected of bribing politicians across multiple EU countries, leading to EU sanctions and its shutdown.

On 11 April 2024 the outlet has resumed its operations and is currently operating from Kazakhstan.

== Russian influence operation ==
Voice of Europe has been described as a part of a broader pro-Russian network financed and directed by Ukrainian oligarch Viktor Medvedchuk, a close associate of Vladimir Putin. Medvedchuk led a pro-Moscow opposition party in Ukraine before Russia’s full-scale invasion, attempted to flee house arrest and reach Russia, and was later exchanged for Ukrainian war prisoners held by Russia. Voice of Europe was later managed by a key Medvedchuk's lieutenant Artem Marchevsky who worked closely with a unit of Russia’s Federal Security Service (FSB), responsible for Ukraine and some former Soviet states (known as the FSB’s Fifth Service). This operation, aimed at destabilizing the European Union and influencing the 2024 European Parliament election through bribes to politicians and anti-Western disinformation, also encompassed other media outlets such as Visegrád Post and golos.eu., with Visegrád Post reportedly sharing the same financing as Voice of Europe.

According to wiretaps and reports from the Czech Security Information Service (BIS) and investigations involving intelligence services from seven EU countries, including Poland, Belgium, and France, Medvedchuk and his associate Artem Marchevsky orchestrated the network from Prague. The organization allegedly funneled up to 1 million euros a month to far-right politicians in at least five EU countries to push Kremlin propaganda, sow division in Europe, and boost pro-Russian candidates in European Parliament elections.

== Sanctions ==
Voice of Europe was sanctioned by the Czech Republic in March 2024 and later in May by the European Union for its role in undermining Ukraine's sovereignty and promoting Kremlin policies. Besides the EU and its member states, Voice of Europe has been sanctioned by Switzerland, Canada, and Ukraine.

The European Council justified the sanctions as follows:

"Voice of Europe, an online media outlet which has engaged in a systematic, international campaign of media manipulation and distortion of facts to destabilise Ukraine, the EU and its member states. Furthermore, Voice of Europe runs a website - with accounts promoting it on social media such as Facebook, YouTube, Telegram and X - actively spreading disinformation related to Ukraine and promoting pro-Kremlin false narratives about the Russian invasion of Ukraine. Additionally, Voice of Europe has been used as a vehicle for funneling of financial resources designated for remuneration of propagandists, and for building a network influencing representatives of political parties in Europe."

== History ==
=== Early History (2016–2019: Dutch Period) ===
The domain for Voice of Europe was registered in 2000, but it evolved into a full-fledged news outlet in 2016, owned by three Dutch citizens and registered in the city of Dronten, Netherlands.

During this period, the site focused primarily on Western Europe, with a heavy emphasis on migration-related topics, often framing stories negatively to criticize EU policies and liberal governments. The video interview with Dominik Tarczyński, for example, contains strong racist symbolism and elements symbolizing anti-Semitic conspiracy theories and is focused on promoting Hungarian Prime Minister Viktor Orbán, known for his pro-Russian stances.

Voice of Europe blended repackaged legitimate news with suggestive commentary, such as implying authorities concealed migrant involvement in crimes, and featured opinion pieces with inflammatory titles.

It conducted high-profile interviews, including one in October 2017 with Dutch far-right politician Geert Wilders of the Party for Freedom (PVV), who praised the site and claimed to read it daily. Wilders' endorsement helped amplify its reach, with Russian-linked Twitter accounts sharing content extensively. Voice of Europe attracted around 250,000 monthly visitors by 2018.

The site was hosted by Dutch entrepreneur Daan van Seventer, who confirmed his role but denied ownership, stating it belonged to three Dutch individuals. Investors included real estate magnate Erik de Vlieger and a female director of a customs company, who invested "tens of thousands of euros" viewing it as a business opportunity akin to the U.S. Breitbart News. De Vlieger initially denied involvement but was confirmed by sources. In May 2018, Thierry Baudet sent a message to a party app group: "Did you know that Erik de Vlieger is the founder and owner of Voice of Europe?" The editorial team remained anonymous, with no bylines on articles, raising questions about its operations.

In February 2018, an investigation by the Dutch magazine De Groene Amsterdammer accused Voice of Europe of spreading pro-Russian propaganda, though no direct Kremlin funding was uncovered at the time. The Netherlands was highlighted as a hub for such disinformation due to lax company registration laws, privacy protections, and its status as an internet node, facilitating opaque operations. Reader interest waned, and the site was labeled a "factory of fakes" by Dutch media. In 2019, de Vlieger announced the sale of the site to an unspecified Czech company.

On December 31, 2019, the editorial team of Voice of Europe informed in a statement published on the website that they “will be ceasing our news publishing operation for the time being”, after which it went offline for several years. For a while, Voice of Europe was down at all, until it suddenly returned in May 2023.

==== Notable Figures Involved with Voice of Europe During This Period ====
In addition to Geert Wilders, those who gave interviews included the British far-right activist Tommy Robinson, Polish Law and Justice (PiS) politician Dominik Tarczyński, Belgian politician Filip Dewinter of Vlaams Belang, and Swedish politician and founder of Alternative for Sweden (AfS) Gustav Kasselstrand.

==== Erik de Vlieger's pro-Russian stances ====
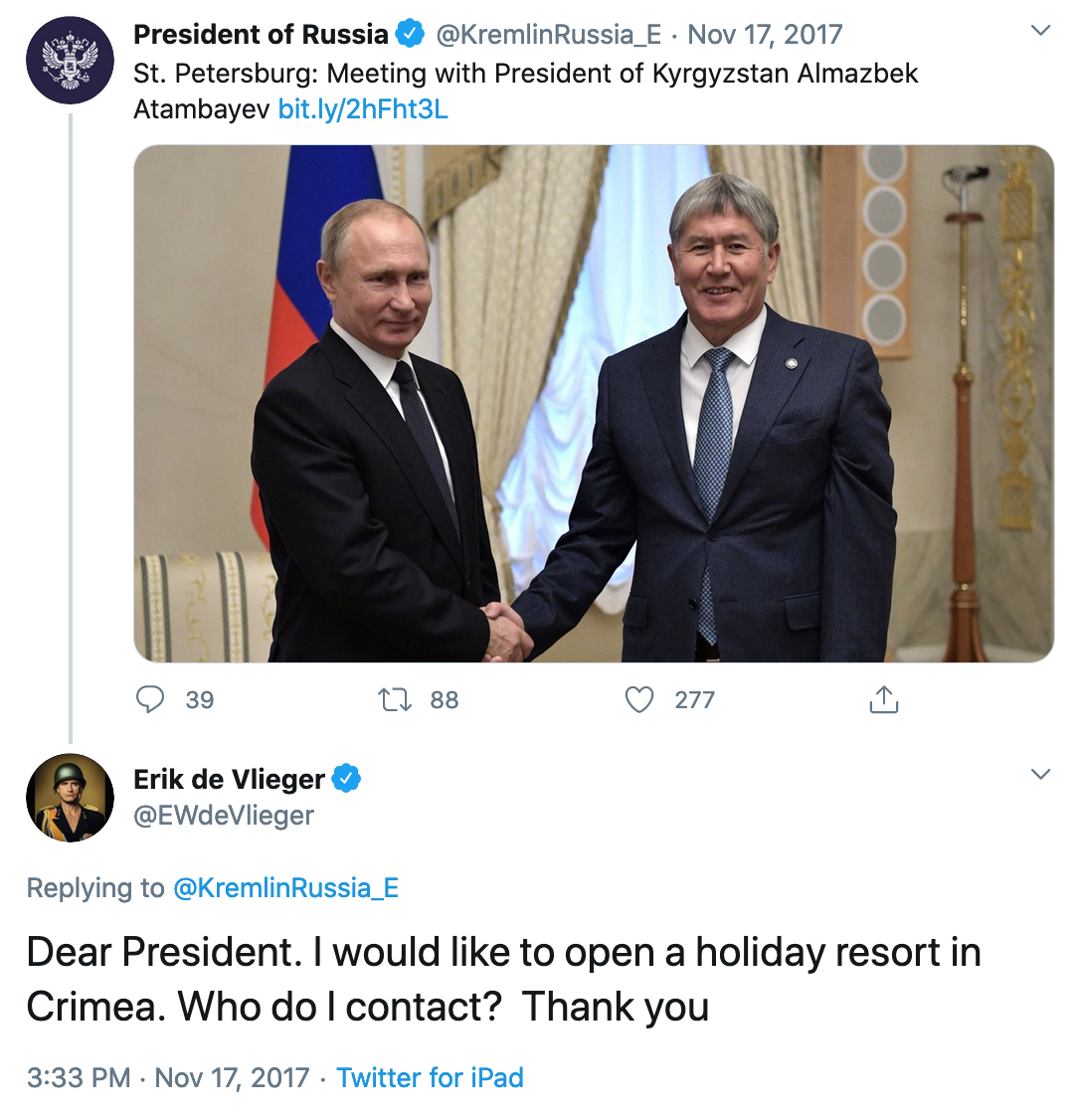
Vlieger's interest to open holiday resort in occupied Crimea

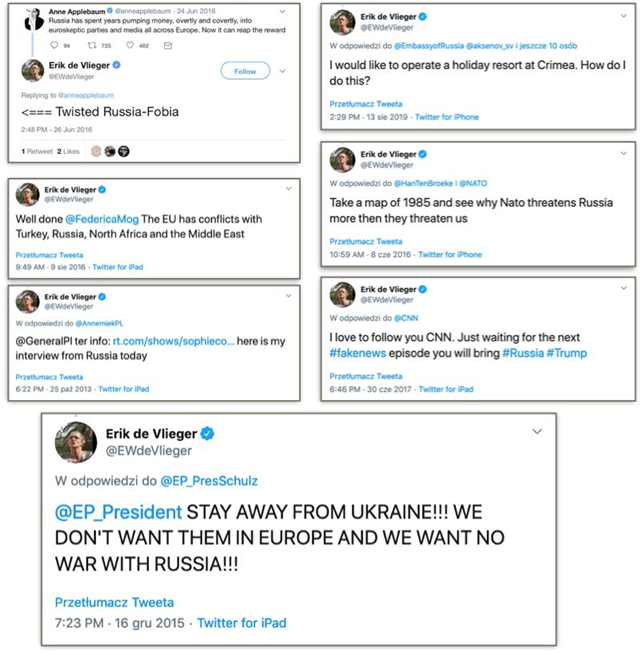
Various comments with pro-Russian narratives by de Vlieger posted on Twitter (2013–2017)

According to preserved screenshots, Erik de Vlieger, the Dutch billionaire and Voice of Europe investor (according to Baudet also a founder), with some business activities in Czechia, during this period, for example, accused Anne Applebaum of Russophobia and declared the interest to open a holiday resort in occupied Crimea. In 2013, he even gave an interview for RT's SophieCo program (hosted by Sophie Shevardnadze). Later, in February 2022, de Vlieger expressed pro-Russian views on social media. In February 2022, de Vlieger expressed pro-Russian views on social media.

==== Cooperation between Thierry Baudet and Erik de Vlieger during this period ====
- May 2015: Erik de Vlieger and Thierry Baudet appeared together in several episodes of the program Studio PowNed in 2015, where they discussed current issues such as targeted killings in the criminal underworld, police violence, racism, political figures such as Jesse Klaver or Geert Wilders, and cultural controversies.
- September 2015: De Vlieger conducted an interview with Baudet for the Café Weltschmerz platform, where they discussed politics, literature, and Baudet’s academic career. This interview served as an introduction to Baudet’s cooperation with the platform.
- January 2016: Co-authorship of an opinion piece in de Volkskrant titled "Europese Unie heeft lak aan Geen Peil-referendum" in which they criticized Dutch Prime Minister Mark Rutte and the EU for their handling of the EU-Ukraine Association Agreement. The article supported Eurosceptic positions.
- 2015–2016: Erik de Vlieger was a co-founder and financial supporter of the Forum for Democracy (FvD) party, which Baudet transformed from a think tank into a political party. De Vlieger belonged to an informal group of entrepreneurs and lawyers who provided initial funding and support.
- May 2018: In a party group chat, Baudet mentioned de Vlieger as the founder and owner of the website Voice of Europe and suggested possible cooperation, which, however, apparently did not materialize.

=== Relaunch (2023–2024: Czech Period) ===
In 2023, Voice of Europe was relaunched and from then on had an address near Wenceslas Square in Prague. In March 2023, a Polish businessman, Jacek Jakubczyk, took over all shares in the company in the legal form of a s.r.o.

In May 2024, Voice of Europe, which is run by Viktor Medvedchuk, was sanctioned by the European Union. The website went offline in March 2024 and subsequently relaunched from Kazakhstan. The platform is currently defunct.

News reports published by the Voice of Europe have stated that foreigners are responsible for more than half of all serious crimes in Frankfurt, Germany and that French President Macron's campaign on the Russian danger is not appealing to French voters, according to recent polls. Le Monde has reported that the DGSI was investigating a pro-Russian campaign towards the European elections next June.

Despite being taken offline in late March 2024 following Czech national sanctions for its alleged role in a Russian influence operation, the pro-Kremlin media outlet Voice of Europe resumed its online activities on April 11, 2024, by relocating its hosting to Kazakhstan. Kazakhstan's hosting environment has been noted for facilitating Russian entities in bypassing Western sanctions.

== Reactions ==
In March 2023, the Czech Ministry of Foreign Affairs Jan Lipavský alleged that Voice of Europe was a "Russian influence operation" designed to "undermine the territorial integrity, sovereignty and independence of Ukraine."

Petr Fiala, Czech Prime Minister, wrote on 27 March 2024, regarding the Czech sanctions on Voice of Europe, that:

"We are imposing national sanctions on three entities. We have intervened in a pro-Russian network that was trying to develop an influence operation in our country with a serious impact on the security of Czechia and the EU. The activities of this group extend beyond Czechia, it also operated in the European Parliament. It shows that the Russian Federation has long been trying to influence democratic processes in Europe, and we must do everything to prevent that."

In a resolution adopted on 25 April 2024, the European Parliament stated that it is "appalled by the credible allegations that MEPs were paid to disseminate Russian propaganda" and expressed outrage that some participated in Voice of Europe "while Russia is waging its illegal war of aggression against Ukraine." Radosław Sikorski, Polish Foreign Minister, stated on 25 May 2024, in reaction to the Voice of Europe revelations, that:

"Russia wanted to destabilize the situation in European ahead of the upcoming elections to the European Parliament. They want to influence the outcome of these elections. (...) We cannot allow them to do it."

Michal Koudelka, director of the Czech Security Information Service (BIS), stated at the Conference on Internal Security and State Resilience on 27 May 2024 that:

"The goal of the people around the media platform Voice of Europe was espionage inside the European Union.(...) various politicians on the platform provided pro-Russian or anti-Ukrainian interviews. The second, far more serious, was that for Russian money, persons operating under the cover of the platform placed articles and information into Western media that were completely clearly pro-Russian, anti-Ukrainian, anti-Western and fulfilled the attempt to influence public opinion. (...) people operating under the cover of Voice of Europe tried to interfere in the June elections to the European Parliament and then ensure espionage inside the EU." and b "This is a language that the Russians understand; this is how we should always proceed."

In connection with EU sanctions against Voice of Europe, Koudelka added that: "This is a language that the Russians understand, this is how we should always proceed." Nancy Faeser, German Interior Minister, stated in November 2024, in reference to Russian influence operations ahead of the German federal elections, that:

"Strengthened protective measures are all the more important. Such attacks do not target individual politicians alone, but aim to undermine trust in our democracy.(...) We have uncovered major lies and influence campaigns from Putin’s propaganda apparatus and - as in the case of Voice of Europe - stopped them before the European elections."

== See also ==
- Visegrád Post
- AfD pro-Russia movement
- Russia–European Union relations
- Russian interference in the 2016 Brexit referendum
- Russian Laundromat
- Transnational repression by Russia
- Accusations of Russian interference in the 2024 Romanian presidential election
