= Magyar Jelen =

Hungarian online newspaper

- Type: Biweekly newspaper (2003–2013); Online newspaper (2020–)
- Editor-in-chief: László Toroczkai
- Founded: 2003; 23 years ago
- Ceased publication: 2013 (print)
- Political alignment: Radical nationalism
- Language: Hungarian
- Headquarters: Ásotthalom
- Country: Hungary
- Website: magyarjelen.hu

Magyar Jelen (Hungarian pronunciation: [ˈmɒɟɒr ˈjɛlɛn], Hungarian: Hungarian Present) is a radical nationalist online newspaper published in Budapest, Hungary, since 2020. Between 2003 and 2013 it was a biweekly print magazine, before ceasing publication.

== Profile ==
The responsible publisher and editor-in-chief of Magyar Jelen was Atilla Szakállas, while László Toroczkai became the editor of the Carpathian Basin edition from 2003 to 2013.

Magyar Jelen had a radical nationalist and an antisemitic stance. Its editor, Toroczkai, published articles in the paper arguing that the Romani and African populations are threats to Hungary.

The online version of Magyar Jelen was restarted in August 2020, after a relative of the owner of the Elemi.hu news portal terminated the access rights of the employees connected to the Our Homeland Movement. László Toroczkai notified the newsletter recipients about this on 25 August 2020. The recipients also learned from a newsletter on 28 August 2020 that the Internet version of Magyar Jelen was launched, which follows the spirit of the Our Homeland Movement. According to the imprint of the online Magyar Jelen, the publisher is the Innovative Communication Foundation, which is based in Ásotthalom.

== See also ==
- List of newspapers in Hungary
