= Ordo Iuris =

Ultra-conservative Polish Catholic organisation

The Ordo Iuris Institute for Legal Culture (Polish: Fundacja Instytut na rzecz Kultury Prawnej Ordo Iuris) is a conservative Polish legal foundation and think tank founded in 2013. The group conducts legal research, policy advocacy, and impact litigation to advance traditional family values, religious freedom, and national sovereignty.

== History ==
Ordo Iuris was founded in 2013 by a network of Polish legal scholars and activists, initially led by Aleksander Stępkowski. The institute was established to serve as a legal counterweight to progressive and liberal NGOs in Poland and international human rights bodies.

Over the course of the 2010s, Ordo Iuris grew into one of the most prominent legal advocacy groups in Poland. It developed close ties with political figures in the conservative Law and Justice (PiS) government, with several of its members being appointed to advisory roles, government ministries, and judicial positions.

The first high-profile initiative of Ordo Iuris was an attempt to draft an anti-abortion bill in 2016, which aimed to its full prohibition and introduce criminal liability for anyone who causes the death of a conceived child, including its mother. However, it caused the Black Protests across the country and was eventually rejected by Sejm voting on 6 October 2016. During the discussion prior to the vote, Joanna Banasiuk of Ordo Iuris presented a "self-amendment" with the aim of removing the so-called criminal record of mothers.

In 2021, it helped to inaugurate the Collegium Intermarium, a private university.

Among the supporters of Ordo Iuris are high-ranking Polish national politicians, such as the former minister of education, Przemysław Czarnek (PiS). Ordo Iuris cooperates with ultra-conservative CitizenGo. Polish journalists documented numerous links of Ordo Iuris with Russia-sponsored ultra-conservative organizations. In early 2022, media covered a sex scandal in Ordo Iuris, which was known for its advocacy of a ban on divorce. In 2023, another affair among Ordo Iuris cadre occurred, again ending in divorce and legal suit.
