= Maciej Szymanowski =

Polish journalist and diplomat

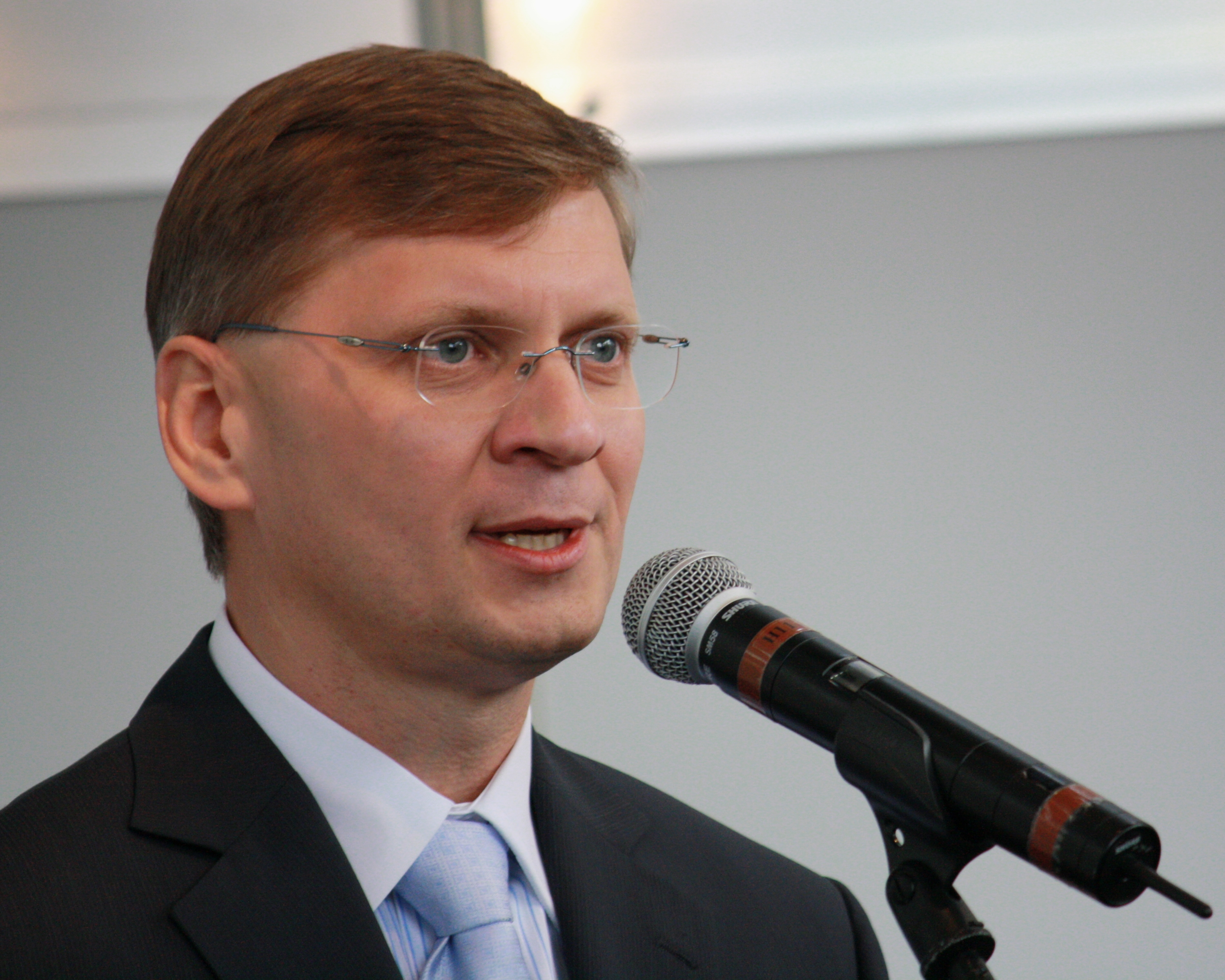
- Maciej Szymanowski (2010)

Director of the Wacław Felczak Institute
- Incumbent
- Assumed office 1 August 2018
- Preceded by: newly created position

Director of the Polish Institute in Prague
- In office 2006–2010
- Preceded by: Piotr Drobniak
- Succeeded by: Mirosław Jasiński

Director of the Polish Institute in Budapest
- In office 2001–2006
- Preceded by: Roland Chojnacki
- Succeeded by: Barbara Wiechno

Personal details
- Born: Maciej Szymanowski; 17 January 1966 (age 60) Poznań, Poland
- Spouse: Lucie Szymanowska
- Education: University of Warsaw
- Awards: Hungarian Order of Merit

Maciej Szymanowski (born January 17, 1966, in Poznań) is a Polish journalist, specialist in Hungarian studies, diplomat, and associate professor. He has served as Director of the Wacław Felczak Polish–Hungarian Cooperation Institute since 2018.

== Życiorys ==
Maciej Szymanowski studied in Budapest in the years 1987–1988, a scholarship he received based on Wacław Felczak’s recommendation. In the late 1980s he was also active in the Polish–Hungarian Solidarity. In 1991, he graduated in Hungarian studies from the University of Warsaw. He is also a Doctor of Philosophy in History, a degree he received in 2001 at the Jagiellonian University for the dissertation Wartości narodowe w komunistycznej propagandzie Czechosłowacji, Polski i Węgier w prasie lat 1949–1953 (The National Values in the Communist Propaganda of Czechoslovakia, Poland, and Hungary in the 1949–1953 press; supervisor: Andrzej Chwalba).

From 1992 to 1999, Szymanowski was an editor of the Czech weekly Respekt. In 2000, he began working for the Polish Ministry of Foreign Affairs as an expert in Central European matters. He also served as Director of the Polish Institute in Budapest from 2001 to 2006 and Director of the Polish Institute in Prague from 2006 to 2010. Afterwards, he worked in the Office of the Minister for Foreign Affairs, assuming responsibility for the Ministry's historical policy in February 2013.

In 2013, Szymanowski began writing for the Polish weekly Do Rzeczy. He also became lecturer at the Pázmány Péter Catholic University in Budapest. His other collaborations include Radio Wnet and the Czech magazine Kontexty. On August 1, 2018, he was appointed Director of the Wacław Felczak Polish–Hungarian Cooperation Institute.

His wife Lucie Szymanowska comes from the Czech Republic. She is a translator of Hungarian, feature writer, and MTVA's Warsaw-based correspondent.

== Main works ==
- Wartości narodowe w propagandzie komunistycznej Polski, Czechosłowacji i Węgier w prasie lat 1949–1953 (National values in communist propaganda of Poland, Czechoslovakia and Hungary in the press of 1949–1953). Wydawnictwo Księgarnia Akademicka, Kraków 2010, 238 pp. ISBN 978-83-7188-512-9 (in Polish).
- Nemzeti értékek a csehszlovák, lengyel és magyar kommunista sajtópropagandában, 1949–1953 (National values in Czechoslovak, Polish and Hungarian communist press propaganda, 1949–1953). Translated by Pálfalvi, Lajos. Pázmány Péter Katolikus Egyetem, Budapest 2017, 176 pp. ISBN 978-963-308-274-4 (in Hungarian).
- Na východ od Západu, na západ od Východu : středoevropské reflexe 1989–2017 (To the East of the West, to the West of the East: Central European reflections 1989–2017). Translated by Szymanowska, Lucie. B&P Publishing, Brno 2018, 265 pp. ISBN 978-80-7485-156-8 (in Czech).

=== Other works ===
- Maciej Ruczaj, Maciej Szymanowski (eds.): Pravým okem : antologie současného polského politického myšleni (With the right eye: an anthology of contemporary Polish political thought). Translated by Baron, Jan. Centrum pro Studium Demokracie a Kultury, Brno 2010, 203 pp. ISBN 978-80-7325-211-3 (in Czech).
- Jan Draus, Maciej Szymanowski: Living torches. Wydawnictwo Sejmowe, Warszawa 2018, 120 pp. ISBN 978-83-7666-588-7
- Jan Draus, Maciej Szymanowski: Before the Berlin wall fell. Hungary, Czechoslovakia and Poland towards the Refugees from the East Germany in 1989. Wydawnictwo Sejmowe, Warszawa 2019, 197 pp. ISBN 978-83-7666-634-1

=== Translations ===
- Mikš, František (2016). Czerwony kogut Picasso. Ideologia a utopia w sztuce XX wieku: od czarnego kwadratu Malewicza do gołąbka pokoju Picassa. Krakow 2016, 258 pp. ISBN 978-83-8021-078-3 (in Polish).

== Awards ==
- Hungarian Order of Merit – Knight's Cross (Civil Division) – Hungary, 2023
- Order of Polonia Restituta – Knight's Cross – for outstanding contributions to the development of international cooperation, for achievements in scientific and journalistic activities - Poland, 2025
