= Sixty-Four Counties Youth Movement =

Sixty-Four Counties Youth Movement Hatvannégy Vármegye Ifjúsági Mozgalom
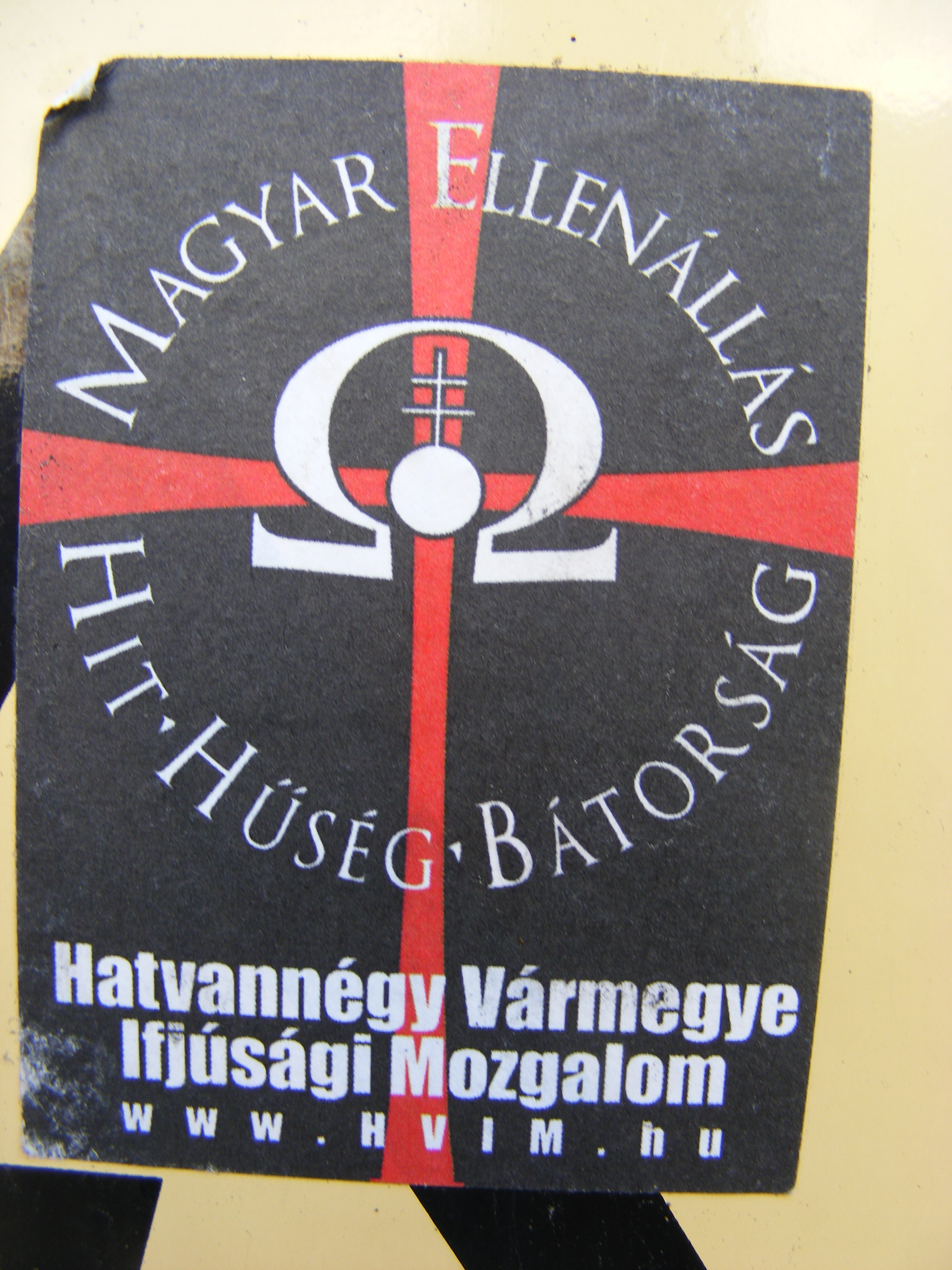
- Leader: György Gyula Zagyva, Gábor Barcsa-Turner
- Founded: 21 April 2001
- Ideology: Ultranationalism; Hungarian irredentism
- Political position: Far-right
- International affiliation: International Sovereigntist League (since 2025)

Website
- https://www.hvim.hu/

The Sixty-Four Counties Youth Movement (Hungarian: Hatvannégy Vármegye Ifjúsági Mozgalom, HVIM) is a far-right movement originating in Hungary and also present in Romania, Slovakia and Serbia, advocating the unification of all ethnic Hungarians that live outside of Hungary and the revision of the Treaty of Trianon from 1920, which defined the current borders of the Hungarian state. The founder and first leader of the movement was László Toroczkai, but he resigned as leader of the movement on October 28, 2006. The next president was György Gyula Zagyva from 2006. László Toroczkai was no longer an active member of the movement after he was elected mayor of Ásotthalom in 2013. He also resigned from the position of honorary president and declared that he would give way to young people, effectively leaving the Sixty-Four County Youth Movement in 2013.

It is named in memory of Greater Hungary, which was divided into 64 counties, although it is an anachronism, because the Kingdom of Hungary had only 63 counties, but the city of Fiume and its district as a corpus separatum was under Hungarian rule and it was meant as the 64th county by the founders for simplicity.

== Ties to other organisations ==
The HVIM is responsible for organising the yearly Magyar Sziget festival. The youth movement has ties to the Betyársereg ('Army of Outlaws'), a black-clad 'self-defense force' that has a motor club as well. This group is also present at the HVIM youth camps, teaching kids survival skills as well as Hungarian history.

== Charges on alleged terrorist act ==
On 1 December 2015, István Beke, a member of the organization, was arrested by the Romanian authorities for planning to detonate an improvised explosive device in Târgu Secuiesc during the Great Union Day parade. Beke was charged with "attempted actions against constitutional order and failure to observe the rules governing the explosive materials regarding the prevention and combat of terrorism".

Zoltán Szőcs, the leader of HVIM's Transylvanian chapter, was also detained. According to the Romanian prosecutor's office, Szőcs had incited Beke and other activists to produce home-made bombs, which would be detonated during the national holiday.

On 1 February 2016, the arrest warrants of the two HVIM members were extended by 30 more days.

On 7 April 2017, Beke and Szőcs were sentenced to 11 months and 10 months imprisonment, respectively. On 4 July 2018, Beke and Szőcs were handed a final sentence of 5 years imprisonment each.

An appeal was filed citing lack of evidence and procedural violations. Attorney Előd Kincses stated that Beke and Szőcs were convicted on charges not found in the Romanian penal code, which the Supreme Court arbitrarily modified without informing the defense.

== Violence in Serbia ==
In September 2011, group of 15 Hungarian members of the "Sixty-Four Counties" movement assaulted 5 Serbian men with metal rods who were going back from their friend's birthday party in Temerin. According to the statement of a victim's mother, the attackers were dressed in uniformed Blackshirts and attacked the young men because they were speaking Serbian. As the mother stated, "these children had to be beaten because they are Serbs and because they speak Serbian in Serbia". The Sixty-Four Counties Youth Movement has repeatedly denied in statements that the organization was involved in the incidents in Temerin. László Toroczkai said in 2012 about these fights in Temerin that the Serbian media had been lying about the organization for years, and they did not publish their corrections. He denied the allegations, saying that the Sixty-Four County Youth Movement (HVIM) has not been present in Serbia for years, so the organization had nothing to do with the incidents in Temerin.

== See also ==
- Our Homeland Movement, Party of László Toroczkai.
