= Yury Voskresensky =

Belarusian politician and businessman

- Юрый Васкрасенскі

Member of the Minsk City Council of Deputies
- In office 2010–2014

Personal details
- Born: February 24, 1977 (age 49) Minsk, Byelorussian SSR
- Education: Belarusian State University

Yury Voskresensky (Yuri Vaskrasenski, Belarusian: Юрый Валер'евіч Васкрасенскі, Russian: Юрий Валерьевич Воскресенский; born 24 February 1977, Minsk) is a Belarusian politician from pro-Lukashenko Communist Party of Belarus and businessman closely collaborating with the regime of Alexander Lukashenko. In 2020, he organized a "Round table of democratic forces" intended to become a dialogue platform, but all major opposition figures refused to collaborate with him. Voskresensky is sometimes accused of working for the Belarusian KGB.

== Early life ==
Voskresensky graduated from the Institute of parliamentarism and entrepreneurship and Belarusian State University. He was an activist of the youth branch (Komsomol) of Party of Communists (PCB) in early 1990s. In 1996, he moved to the pro-Lukashenko Communist Party of Belarus (CPB).

In 2008, he participated in parliamentary elections in the 106th precinct as a CPB representative against former PCB leader Sergey Kalyakin. He lost this election. In 2010, he participated in the municipal elections to Minsk City Council of Deputies, again as a CPB representative. He was elected. Later in 2010, he participated in All Belarusian People's Assembly and was invited to Lukashenko's inauguration.

In 2019, at least three companies related to Voskresensky were named by the Russian Rosselkhoznadzor as illegal exporters of banned foods to Russia by organizing their fake export to Kazakhstan and Kyrgyzstan via Russian territory. Voskresensky gave interview claiming that Rosselkhoznadzor's allegations are wrong.

== 2020 election and its aftermath ==
In 2020, Voskresensky joined the initiative group of Viktar Babaryka who intended to participate in the presidential election. Voskresensky collected signatures for Babaryka's registration in Pyershamayski District of Minsk. Several media claimed that Voskresensky was a member of the Babaryka's electoral headquarters, but Babaryka later dismissed that allegation. According to Babaryka's electoral site, 14,660 signatures were collected in Pyershamayski district. All these signatures were later found invalid by the Central Election Commission of Belarus.

On 12 August 2020, Voskresensky was arrested by the KGB and was named the organizer of the protests in Uručča microdistrict of Minsk. He was sent to KGB SIZO (detention prison), but gave several interviews to the state TV channels criticizing opponents of Lukashenko. On 11 October 2020, Voskresensky was released. He claimed that he was released because KGB saw his potential and the investigator believed him. After being released, Voskresensky praised Lukashenko and criticized opposition leaders.

On 11 November 2020, Voskresensky announced that he created "Round table of democratic forces" (Russian: Круглый стол демократических сил; KSDS) and said that it should become the opposition platform for dialogue with the authorities. It was noted that KSDS rented former office of Babaryka's electoral headquarters. Voskresensky claimed that the opposition association Coordination Council agreed to participate in KSDS, which was denied by the Coordination Council on the same day.

Opposition leader Sviatlana Tsikhanouskaya refused to participate in Voskresensky's activities, claiming that he imitates dialogue and acts in the interests of authorities. She also called him a "political impostor". Opposition candidate Siarhei Cherachen also criticized Voskresensky's round table as an imitation of dialogue. Another opposition candidate in 2020 elections Andrey Dmitriyeu refused to participate in Voskresensky's KSDS, calling it a "stillborn initiative designed to discredit the idea of dialogue". He also voiced the assumption that Voskresensky is a hostage who tries to avoid going to KGB prison again. Analytical center in exile iSANS characterized Voskresensky's role as a negotiator with the authorities who was designated by them. Despite the lack of interest of the opposition, KSDS activities were widely covered by the state-owned media. Grigory Ioffe from the Jamestown Foundation characterized Voskresensky as being "discredited by the protestors as a traitor to their collective cause".

In September 2021, Voskresensky visited Karpacz economic forum in Poland. Voskresensky claimed that he wanted to meet with the representatives of Ministry of foreign affairs of Poland and start negotiations about the lifting of sanctions against Belarus. He claimed to be invited by Poland by the government, but the Polish deputy foreign minister denied this. Organizers later said that he was invited by mistake. However, Polish web portal Onet.pl claimed that Voskresensky's visit wasn't accidental because Poland wanted to free imprisoned activists of Polish minority in Belarus.
