= Economic Forum (in Poland) =

Economic Forum is an annual international meeting of economic and political elites held in the first half of September at a ski and spa resort of Karpacz, Poland. The Forum was founded by Zygmunt Berdychowski in 1992 and it is organised by the Foundation Institute for Eastern Studies in Warsaw.

From 1992–2019, it was held in Krynica-Zdrój. The Economic Forum is one of the most notable meetings of the political and business leaders of Central and Eastern Europe, and is therefore sometimes referred to as the "Eastern Davos". According to the organisers, the mission of the Economic Forum is to create a favorable climate for development of political and economic cooperation in Europe. The opinions of the Forum's speakers are often quoted by the international media and discussed by leading analysts. The Forum includes political, business, and nonprofit leaders. The 29th edition of the Economic Forum in 2019 was attended by 4,500 visitors from 60 countries.

== Debates ==
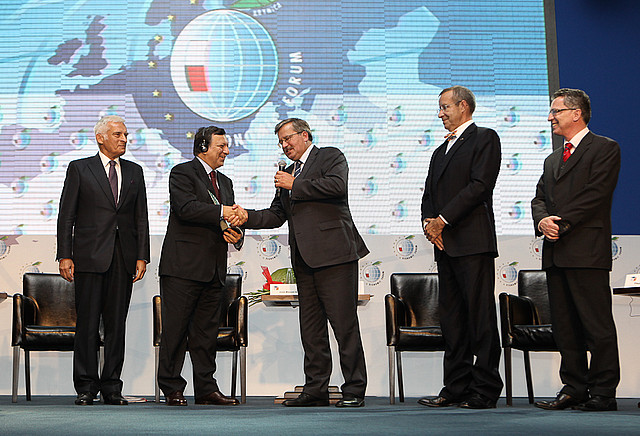
Former President of Poland Bronisław Komorowski, Jose Manuel Barroso and Jerzy Buzek during the 20th Krynica Economic Forum

Over 200 debates and discussion panels are held annually during the Forum. They are grouped in the following theme paths:

- Business and Management
- Europe and the World
- Healthcare Forum
- Investments Forum
- Innovations Forum
- International Politics
- New Economy
- Regions' Forum
- Society
- Sustainable Development

== Media ==
The Forum is regularly covered by journalists from major international media outlets. The debates and discussion panels have been covered by Bloomberg, AFP, Reuters, ANSA or TASS, and by leading daily newspapers such as: Die Welt, Frankfurter Allgemeine Zeitung, Le Figaro, Euronews, Kommersant, Financial Times and The Wall Street Journal.
