= Collegium Intermarium =

University in Warsaw, Poland

- Uczelnia Collegium Intermarium
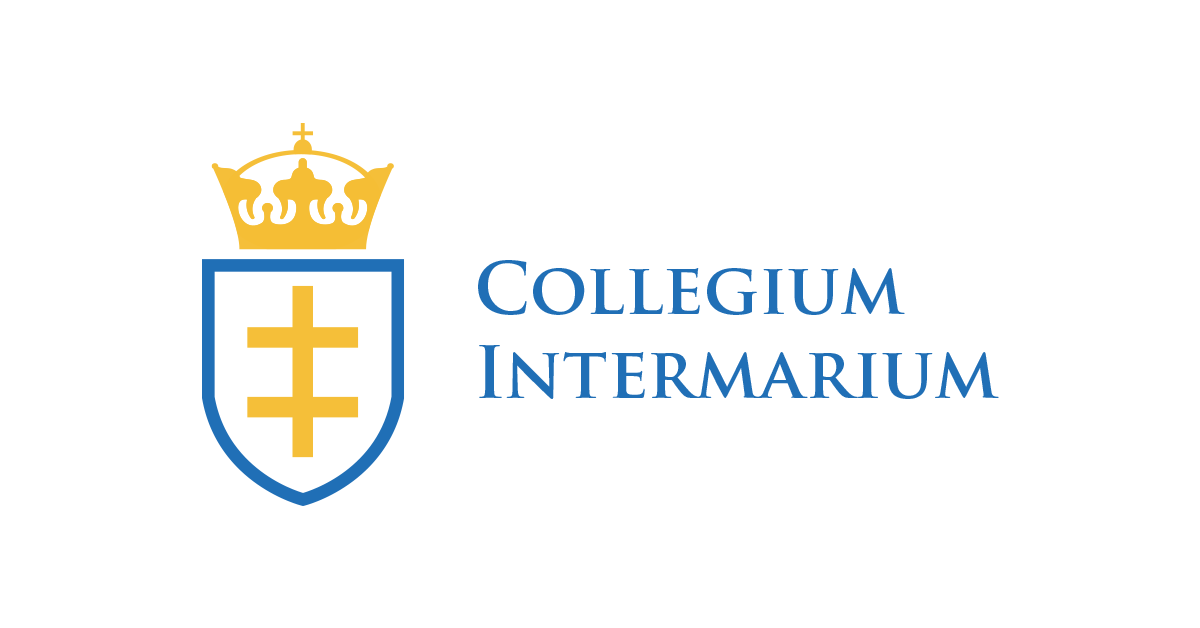
- Established: 2021; 5 years ago
- Affiliations: Education for Values Foundation, Ordo Iuris
- Rector: Tymoteusz Zych
- Academic staff: 11-50
- Location: ul. Bagatela 12, 00-588, Warsaw, Poland
- Website: collegiumintermarium.org

Collegium Intermarium (Polish: Uczelnia Collegium Intermarium) is a university located in Warsaw, Poland. The university was founded in 2021 and opened with an inauguration conference on 28 May. The university was inaugurated by Education for Values Foundation and is also linked to Ordo Iuris, a conservative legal Polish think tank known for its advocacy for traditional values and Christian ethics.

== History ==
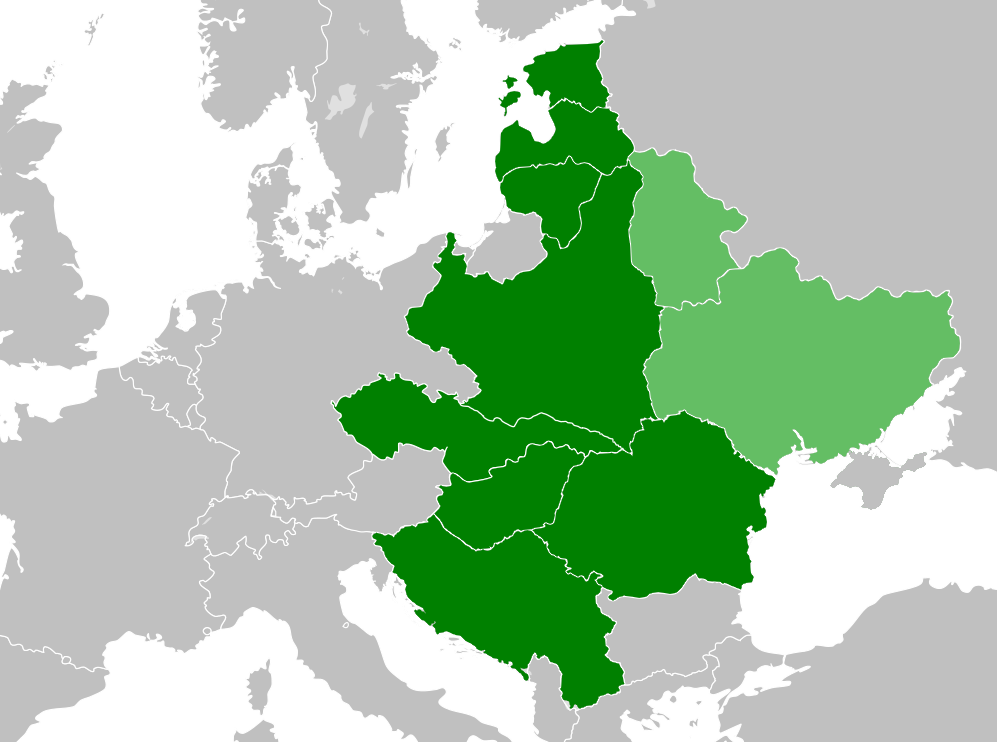
The Intermarium (Polish: Międzymorze) was a proposed federation in Central Europe by Józef Piłsudski.

Collegium Intermarium is the first university registered in Poland after the major 2017 Polish education system reform. The name of the university refers to the countries of the Intermarium region, which was a geopolitical project conceived by politicians in successor states of the former Polish–Lithuanian Commonwealth. The name of the university reflects the intention to support and cooperate with the community of the Intermarium region.

The project is intended to promote conservative causes in Europe based on Roman legal culture, Greek philosophy and Christian ethics. The university offers accredited degrees at the master's level in law, with the curriculum to include related subjects like the history of law and philosophy. In addition, several postgraduate degree courses are launched in the fall of 2021, including Ethics degree for school teachers; Classical Europe: Politics, Culture and Art of Debate; NGO Management and Forensic Science. It plans to offer a PhD program in four to five years. The university says it will be privately funded at first but plans to seek public funding in the future.

== See also ==
- Intermarium
- Intermarium region
- Three Seas Initiative
