= Ásotthalom =

- Large village
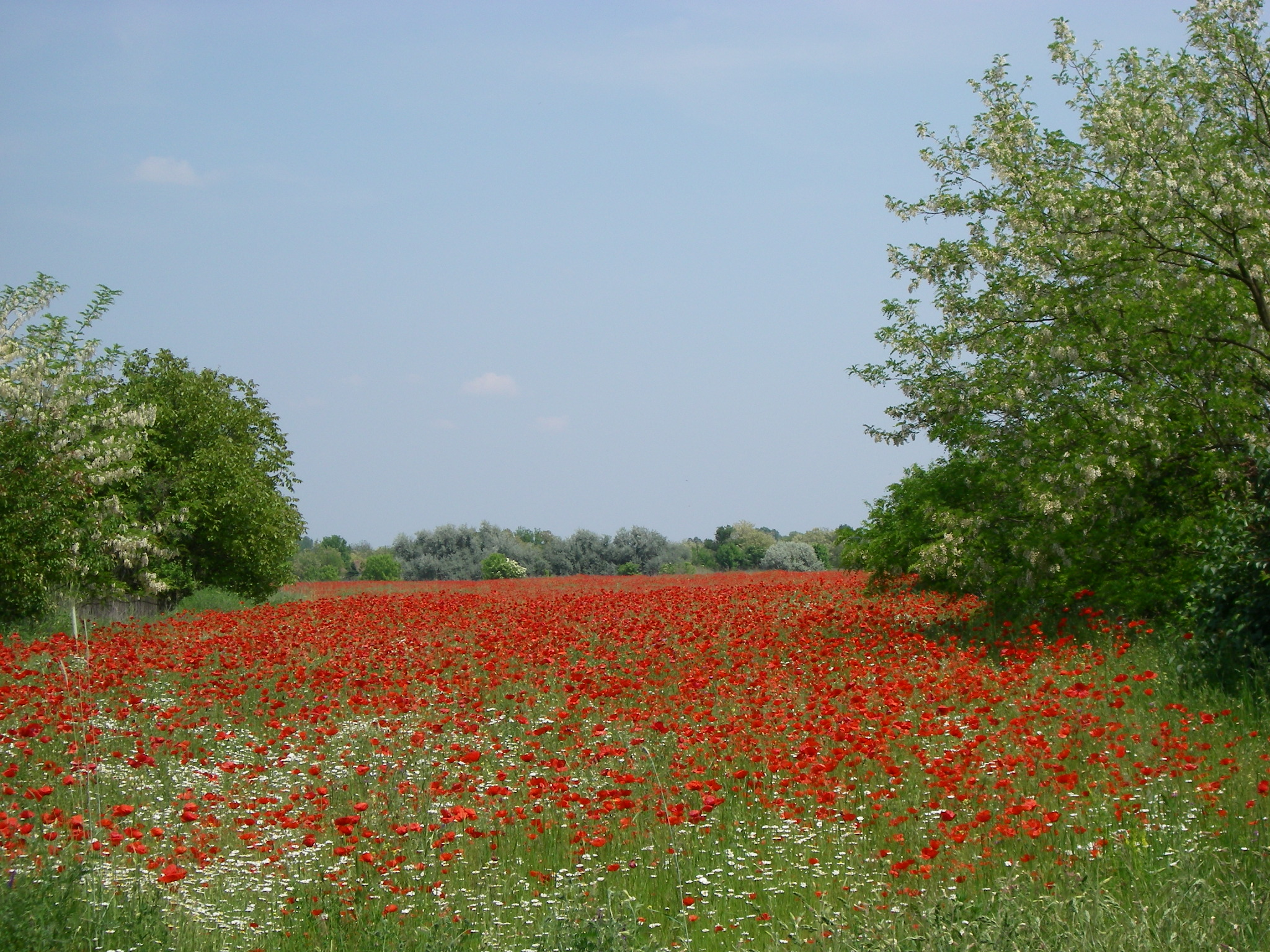
- Red poppy field near Ásotthalom

- Coat of arms

- Location of Ásotthalom in Csongrád County, Hungary Location of Ásotthalom in Hungary
- Coordinates: 46.19875°N 19.78334°E
- Country: Hungary
- County: Csongrád-Csanád
- District: Mórahalom

Government
  - Mayor: Renáta Papp (Independent) 2022-present

Area
  - Total: 122.54 km^{2} (47.31 sq mi)

Population (2017)
  - Total: 3,856
  - Density: 31.47/km^{2} (81.50/sq mi)
- Time zone: UTC+1 (CET)
  - Summer (DST): UTC+2 (CEST)
- Postal code: 6783
- Area code: (+36) 62

Ásotthalom is a village in Csongrád County, in the Southern Great Plain region of southern Hungary, near the border with Serbia.

== Geography ==
It covers an area of 122.54 km^{2} (47 sq mi) and has a population of 3,856 people (2017).

== Politics ==
The local mayor László Toroczkai was the vice-president of the right-wing nationalist Jobbik party, but after his exclusion he created a new party. During the 2015 European migrant crisis, over 10,000 Syrian and Iraqi migrants have passed through the village, with some aiming to settle there. As per 2017, only two Muslims are known to be permanently settled there. There are no mosque-designated structures and the mayor have banned any building of mosques in 2017. In 2017, it was reported that the local government had banned the Muslim call to prayer, Muslim clothing, and public displays of same-sex affection. The mayor have called for all the Christian locals to support for a "holy war on Muslims" and multiculturalism. In April 2017, after a lawsuit challenging the ban was filed, the Constitutional Court struck down the ban, ruling that it violated human rights law as it aimed to "limit directly the freedom of speech, conscience and religion".

In June 2018, the mayor spoke with some Afrikaner farmers from South Africa about plans to resettle Afrikaners to live in Ásotthalom.
