= László Toroczkai =

Hungarian politician (born 1978)

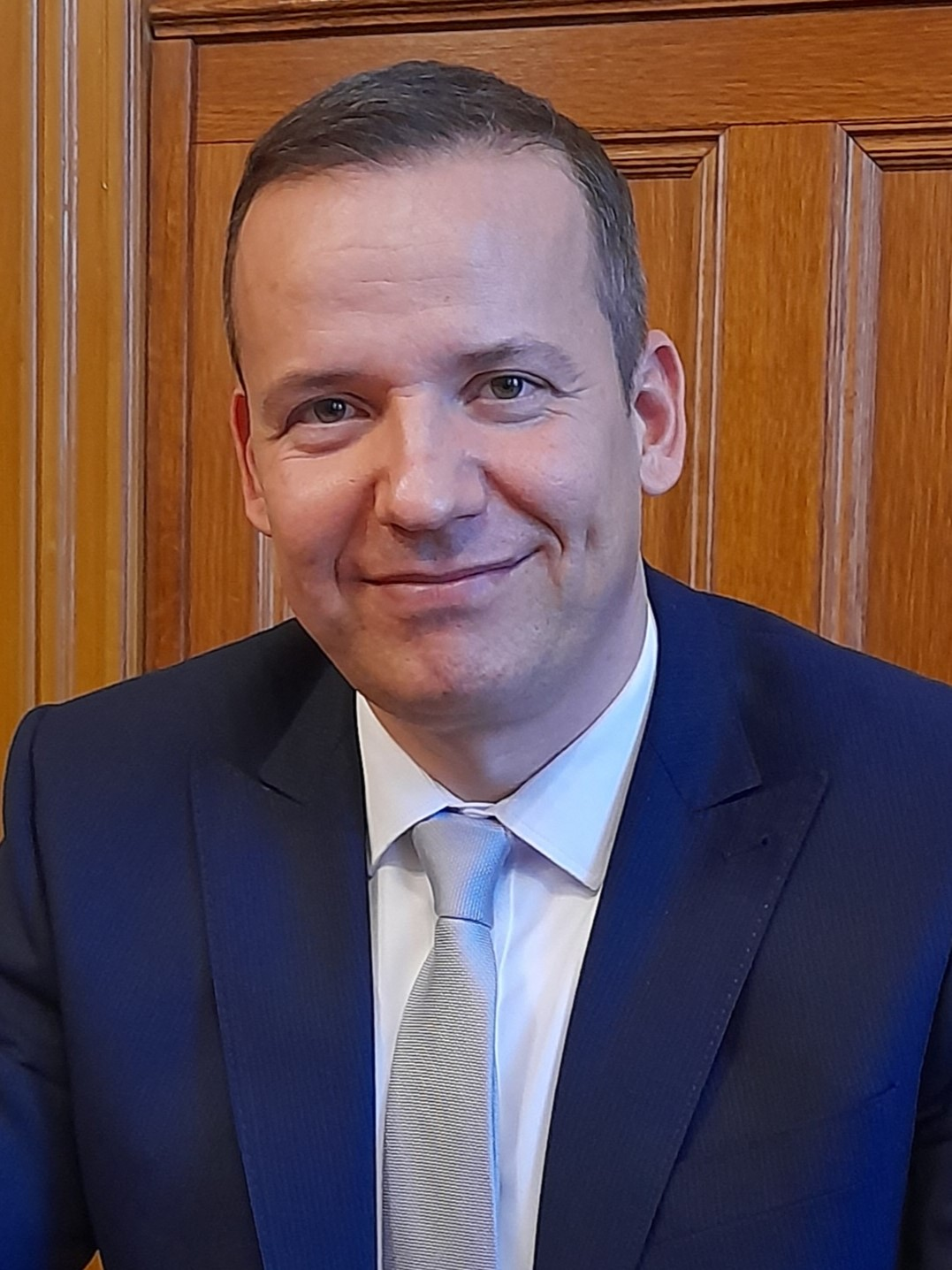
- Toroczkai in 2024

President of Our Homeland Movement
- Incumbent
- Assumed office 23 June 2018
- Preceded by: Office established

Mayor of Ásotthalom
- In office 15 December 2013 – 27 April 2022
- Preceded by: Ferenc Petró
- Succeeded by: Renáta Papp

Member of the National Assembly
- Incumbent
- Assumed office 2 May 2022

Personal details
- Born: László Tóth; 10 March 1978 (age 48) Szeged, Hungary
- Party: MHM (since 2018)
- Other political affiliations: MIÉP (1996–2000); HVIM (2001–2013); Jobbik (2016–2018)
- Spouse: Toroczkai Mihaela (m. 2009; div. 2017)
- Children: 3
- Education: University of Szeged
- Profession: Politician; journalist
- Website: László Toroczkai website

László Toroczkai (born László Tóth, 10 March 1978) is a Hungarian politician and journalist, who is the leader of the far-right party Our Homeland Movement. He previously served as the mayor of Ásotthalom from 2013 until 2022. He is also a member of the Parliamentary Assembly of the Council of Europe, and vice-president of Board of the Hungarian National Group of the Inter-Parliamentary Union (2022–2026). Also chairman of Hungary-Bahrain Friendship Group 2022- and chairman of Hungary-Rwanda Friendship Group 2022-

He is also a founding member of the HVIM youth organization, the Hunnia national radical movement, and former Vice President of Jobbik. Between 2002 and 2013 he served as editor-in-chief of the Magyar Jelen newspaper. From 1999 to 2002 he was an editor-reporter of the Hungarian Radio.

== Family ==
The Treaty of Trianon heavily impacted his family. Ancestors from his mother's side were expelled from Trascău and Cluj; ancestors from his father's side were expelled from Sombor and Odžaci. As a fearful judge, one of his great-grandfathers, Gusztáv Tutsek, had a major role in the aftermath of the failed Hungarian Revolution of 1956 and was widely condemned for presiding over some of the notorious show trials. It was he who convicted Mária Wittner among others. Conservative rights author Anna Tutsek, who was born in Cluj-Napoca, was also his relative. In the 1930s his grandfather, László Tóth, who was from Bačka, was a gendarme and a football player. Later on, during World War II, he served in the Royal Hungarian Army. He was deployed to recapture Bačka and Northern Transylvania and then participated in fights at the Eastern front.

His great-great-grandmother, Izabella Szilágyi de Székelyföldvár, descended from Mihály Szilágyi de Vérvölgy. Mihály Szilágyi was the uncle of Mihály Szilágyi, Governor of Hungary and Captain of the Belgrade Fortress during the victory at Nándorfehérvár (Belgrad), as well as Erzsébet Szilágyi, wife of János Hunyadi, Governor of Hungary, and the mother of King Matthias I of Hungary.

László Toroczkai has 3 children. He was twice married. His second wife is from Western Moldavia, Romania. They divorced in 2017.

== Political career ==
Born in Szeged, Toroczkai studied communication at the University of Szeged. He defines himself as a national radical.

In 2004, Toroczkai was banned from Serbia after being involved in a scuffle with a group of Serbs in the town of Palić. In 2006, the authorities of Slovakia also banned him from the country for five years because of demonstrations that he organized in front of the Slovak Ministry of Internal Affairs. He became a nationally known political figure during the 2006 protests in Hungary and especially because of his role in the siege of the headquarters of Magyar Televízió, the Hungarian public television where he led the protesting crowd in Budapest from the Kossuth Square to the Liberty Square.

=== Mayor of Ásotthalom (2013–2022) ===
Between 2013 and 2022 he was the mayor of Ásotthalom. He was elected as mayor in a by-election with 71.5% of the vote. In the regularly scheduled election in 2014 he was re-elected unanimously. He was re-elected with 68.42% of the vote in the 2019 local elections.

In early 2015, he proposed to have a border fence built along the southern border of Hungary in order to stop illegal migration, which was later implemented as the Hungarian border barrier the same year by the Hungarian government. During the 2015 European migrant crisis, over 10,000 Syrian and Iraqi migrants passed through the village, with only a handful of them aiming to settle there. In 2017, only two Muslims were known to choose Ásotthalom as their permanent residence. There are no mosque-designed structures built in the village up to date and the municipal council of Toroczkai-led Ásotthalom decided that no mosque or other religious structure could be built that would diminish the significance of the existing Catholic church. In addition, the local government had banned the Muslim call to prayer, burqa, and public displays of same-sex affection. He endorsed policies to ban the promotion of pro-LGBT rights advertisements and Islamic religious practices in Ásotthalom, arguing that the aim was to preserve traditions of Hungary. In April 2017, after a lawsuit challenging the ban's legitimacy had been filed, the Constitutional Court struck it down, ruling that it violated human rights law as it aimed to "directly limit the freedom of speech, conscience and religion". However Toroczkai says that he respects all historical religions, including Islam, and he is fighting against mass migration and extreme liberalism, not against religions and traditions.

He is the patron of the Hungulf Expo and Conference, which builds friendly relations with the Arab countries of the Gulf, and Toroczkai is the chairman of the Hungary-Bahrain Friendship Group.

In June 2018, Toroczkai discussed plans with Afrikaner farmers to relocate to Ásotthalom.

=== Party leader ===
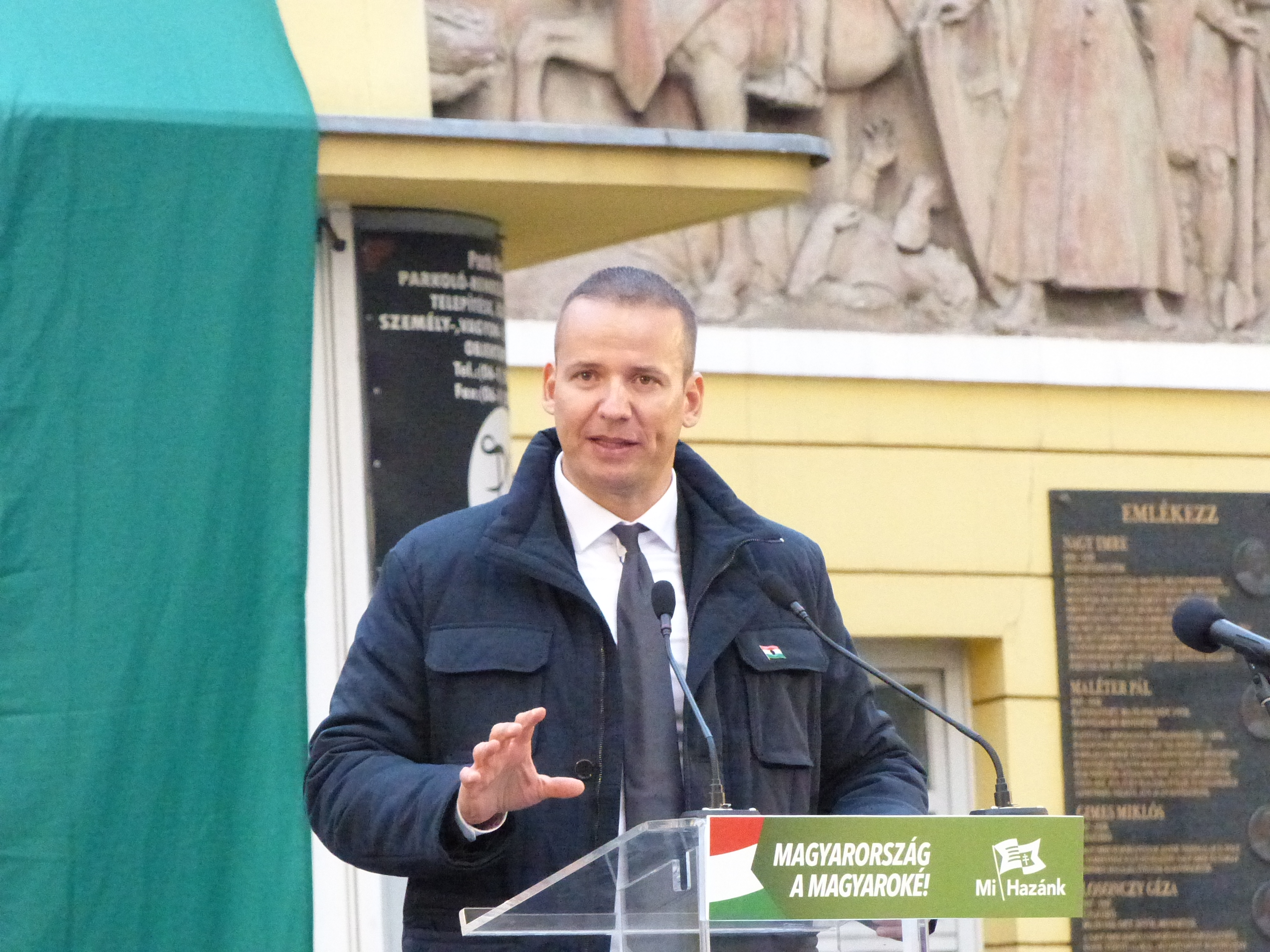
Toroczkai László speaking in Corvin köz

Between 2010 and 2014, he was a local representative of Csongrád County. He is the former vice president of the Jobbik party and led its county list during the elections of 2010 and 2014.

After the 2018 Hungarian parliamentary election, Toroczkai was a contender for Jobbik's presidency, but he lost to his opponent Tamás Sneider, receiving 46.2% of the vote. He later told reporters he had formed a new platform and allowed party leaders time until 23 June to integrate its ideology and policies into the party's political programmes or risk a break-up of Jobbik.

He said the platform had plans to return to the original goals pursued by Jobbik, including stopping the emigration of the Hungarian youth to the wealthier western part of the EU, taking a tough line on Hungary's Roma minority, and supporting the ethnic Hungarian minorities in neighboring states.

On 8 June 2018, Jobbik revoked Toroczkai's membership and expelled him from the party. In response, he established a new political movement which formed into a party called Our Homeland Movement with fellow former Jobbik MP Dóra Dúró.

=== In the Parliament ===
In the 2022 parliamentary elections, Mi Hazánk surpassed the threshold to enter parliament with 6% of the vote, winning 6 seats.

On 27 April 2022 the Our Country parliamentary group was formed, in which he was elected as the leader of the Our Country faction.

Party political offices
New title	President of Our Homeland; 2018-present	Incumbent
National Assembly of Hungary
New parliamentary group	Leader of the MHM parliamentary group 2022–present	Incumbent
