= Tumulus =

Mound of earth and stones raised over graves

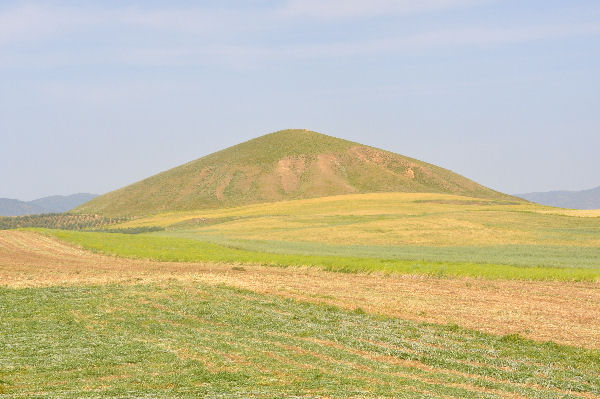
Tomb of King Alyattes at Bin Tepe in Lydia, modern Turkey, built c. 560 BC. It is one of the largest tumuli ever built, with a diameter of 360 meters and a height of 61 meters.

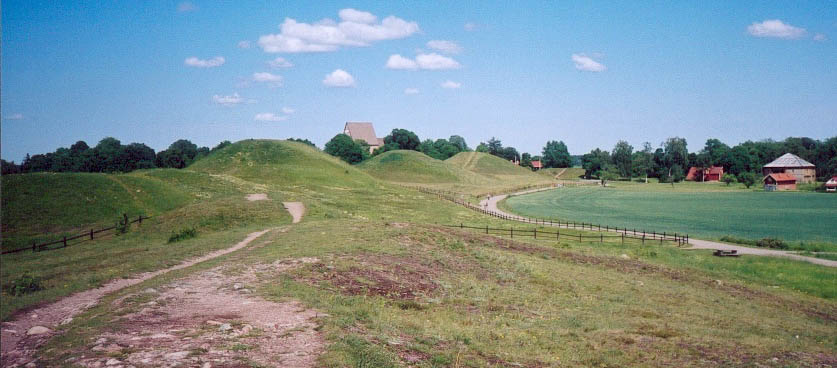
The Royal Mounds of Gamla Uppsala in Sweden from the 5th and 6th centuries. Originally, the site had 2,000 to 3,000 tumuli, but due to quarrying and agriculture only 250 remain.

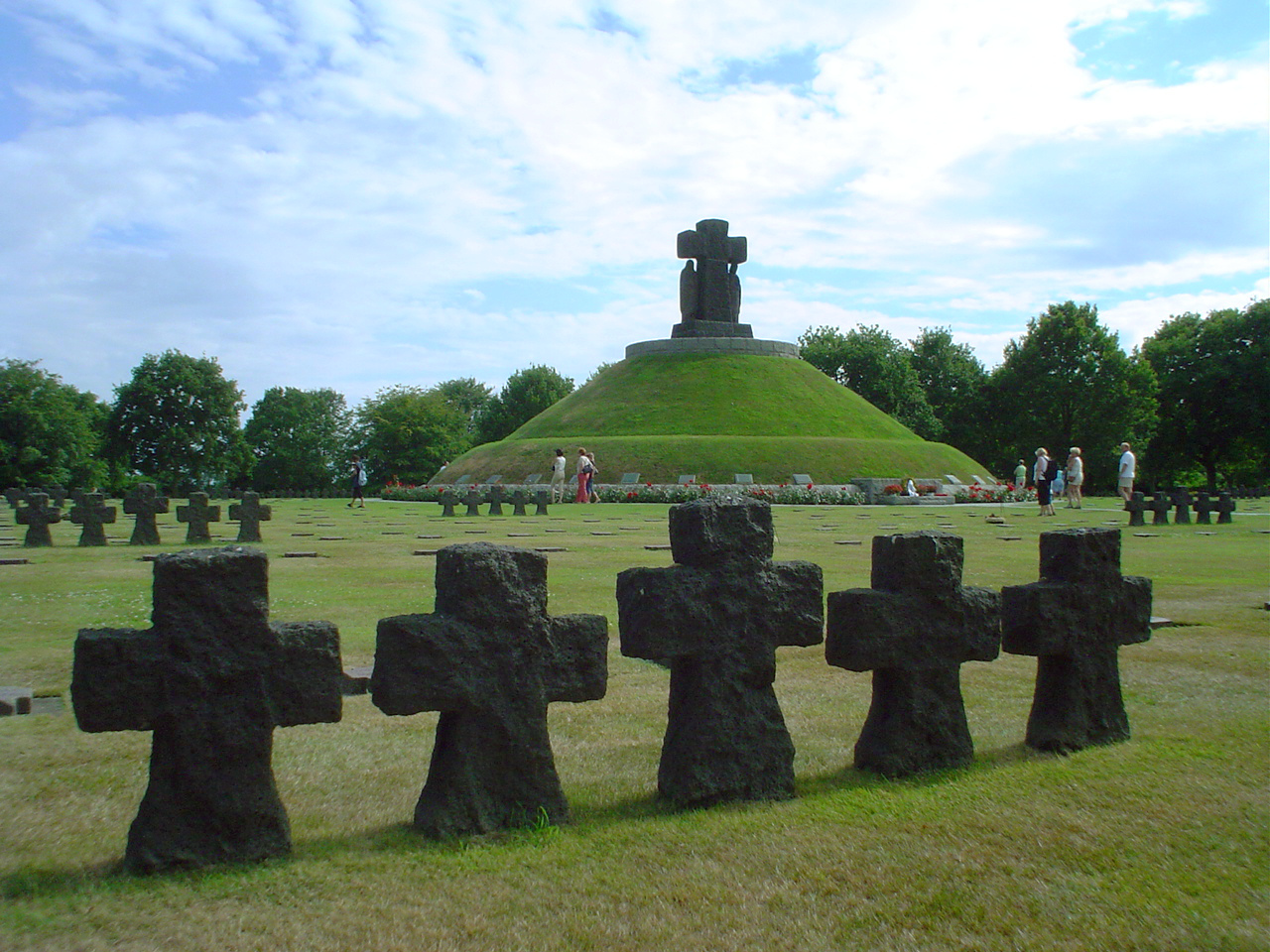
La Cambe German war cemetery

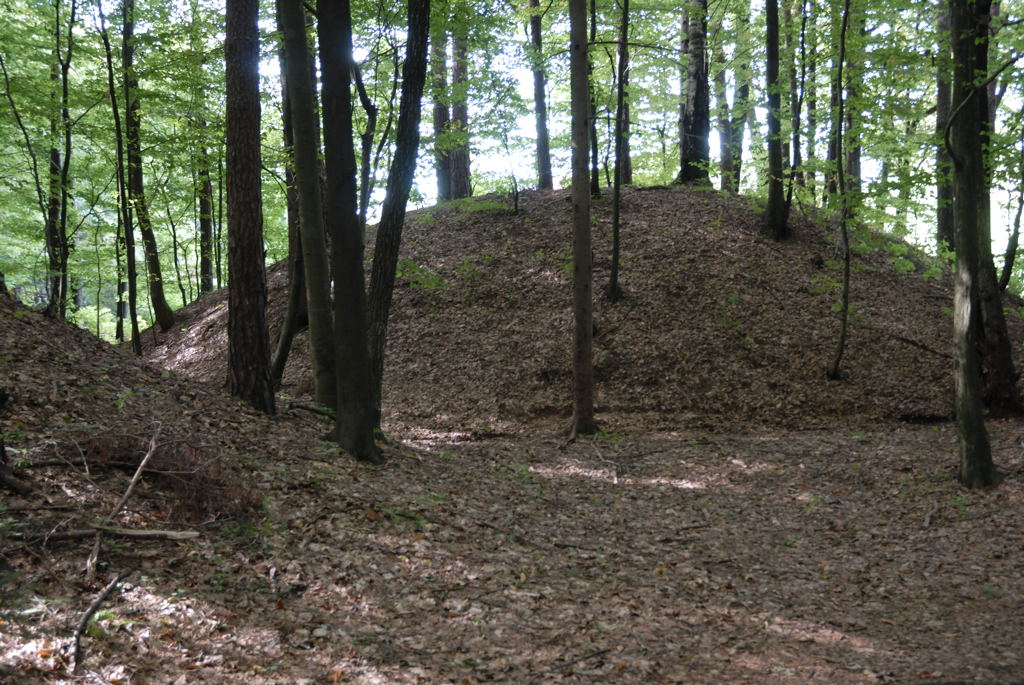
One of the Hallstatt culture–era tumuli in the Sulm valley necropolis

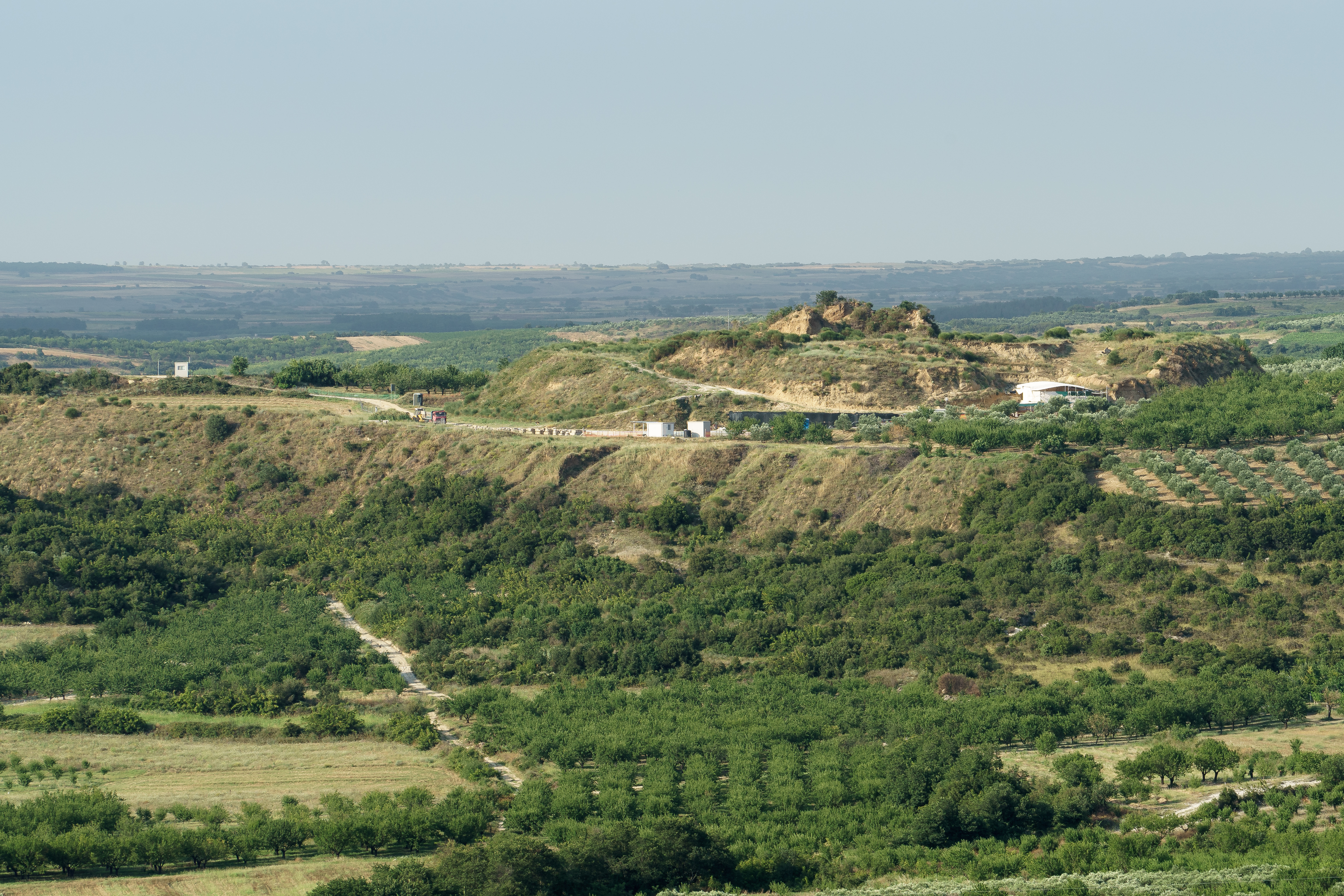
Kasta tumulus Amphipolis

A tumulus (pl.: tumuli) is a mound of earth and stones raised over a grave or graves. Tumuli are also known as barrows, burial mounds, mounds, howes, or in Siberia and Central Asia as kurgans, and may be found throughout much of the world. A cairn, which is a mound of stones built for various purposes, may also originally have been a tumulus.

Tumuli are often categorised according to their external apparent shape. In this respect, a long barrow is a long tumulus, usually constructed on top of several burials, such as passage graves. A round barrow is a round tumulus, also commonly constructed on top of burials. The internal structure and architecture of both long and round barrows have a broad range; the categorization only refers to the external apparent shape.

The method of inhumation may involve a dolmen, a cist, a mortuary enclosure, a mortuary house, or a chamber tomb. Examples of barrows include Duggleby Howe and Maeshowe.

== Etymology ==
The word tumulus is Latin for 'mound' or 'small hill', which is derived from the Proto-Indo-European root *teuh_{2}- with extended zero-grade *tum-, 'to bulge, swell' also found in tomb, tumor, tumescent, thumb, thigh, and thousand. Its synonym "howe" is derived from Old Norse: haugr.

== Burial accounts ==
The funeral of Patroclus is described in book 23 of Homer's Iliad. Patroclus is burned on a pyre, and his bones are collected into a golden urn in two layers of fat. The barrow is built on the location of the pyre. Achilles then sponsors funeral games, consisting of a chariot race, boxing, wrestling, running, a duel between two champions to the first blood, discus throwing, archery and spear throwing.

Beowulf's body in the Anglo-Saxon poem Beowulf is taken to Hronesness, where it is burned on a funeral pyre. During cremation, the Geats lament the death of their lord, a widow's lament being mentioned in particular, singing dirges as they circumambulate the barrow. Afterwards, a mound is built on top of a hill, overlooking the sea, and filled with treasure. A band of twelve of the best warriors ride around the barrow, singing dirges in praise of their lord.

Parallels have also been drawn to the account of Attila's burial in Jordanes' Getica. Jordanes tells that as Attila's body was lying in state, the best horsemen of the Huns circled it, as in circus games.

An Old Irish Life of Columcille reports that every funeral procession "halted at a mound called Eala, whereupon the corpse was laid, and the mourners marched thrice solemnly round the spot."

== Types ==
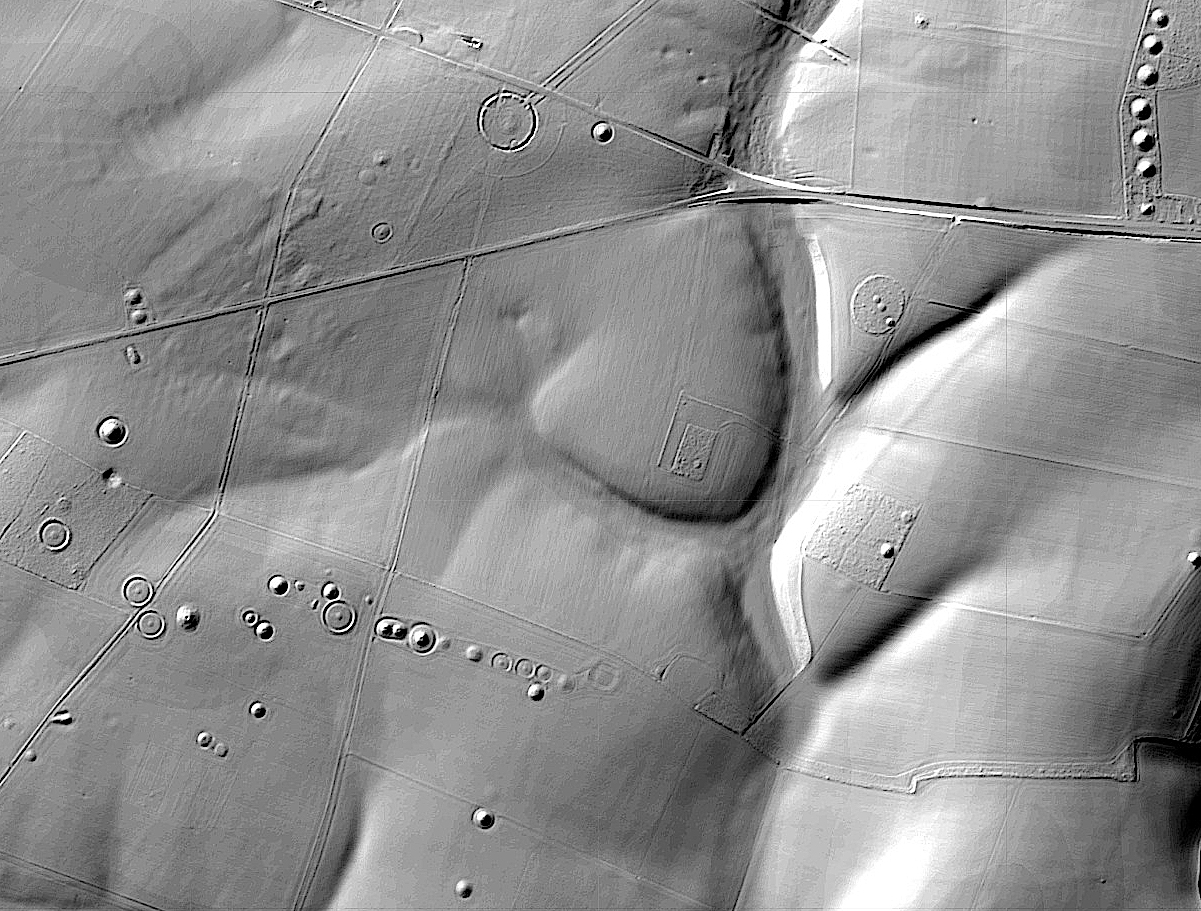
A lidar view of the landscape south of Stonehenge (top left of centre) and some associated barrows

Archaeologists often classify tumuli according to their location, form, and date of construction (see also mound). Some British types are listed below:

- Bank barrow
- Bell barrow
- Bowl barrow
- D-shaped barrow – round barrow with a purposely flat edge at one side often defined by stone slabs.
- Disc barrow
- Fancy barrow – generic term for any Bronze Age barrows more elaborate than a simple hemispherical shape.
- Long barrow
- Oval barrow – a Neolithic long barrow consisting of an elliptical, rather than rectangular or trapezoidal mound.
- Platform barrow – The least common of the recognised types of round barrow, consisting of a flat, wide circular mound that may be surrounded by a ditch. They occur widely across southern England with a marked concentration in East and West Sussex.
- Pond barrow – a barrow consisting of a shallow circular depression, surrounded by a bank running around the rim of the depression, from the Bronze Age.
- Ring barrow – a bank that encircles a number of burials.
- Round barrow – a circular feature created by the Bronze Age peoples of Britain and also the later Romans, Vikings, and Saxons. Divided into subclasses such as saucer and bell barrow – the Six Hills are a rare Roman example.
- Saucer barrow – a circular Bronze Age barrow that features a low, wide mound surrounded by a ditch that may have an external bank.
- Square barrow – burial site, usually of Iron Age date, consisting of a small, square, ditched enclosure surrounding a central burial, which may also have been covered by a mound.

== Modern practices ==
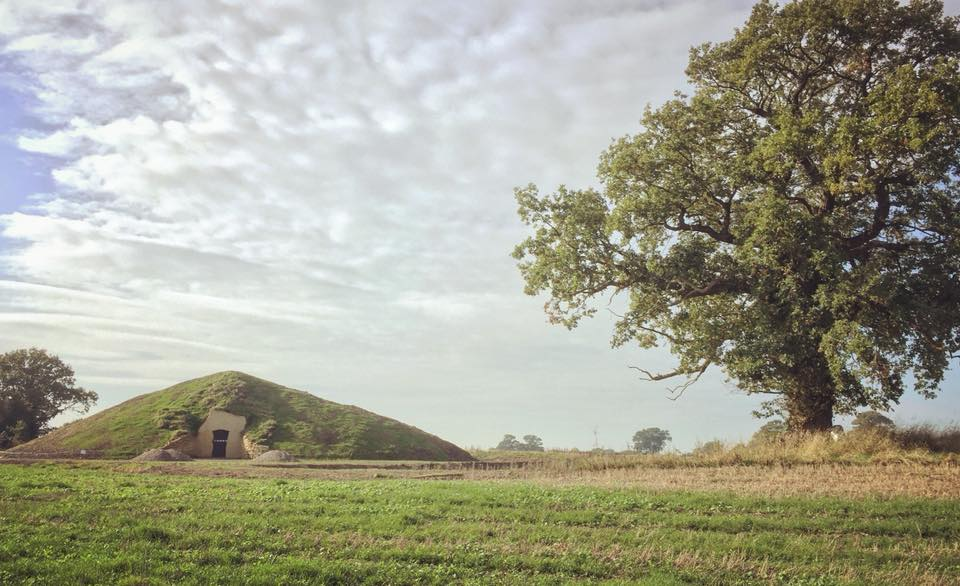
Soulton Long Barrow, an example of the modern barrows

There is a contemporary revival in barrow building in the UK. In 2015 the first long barrow in thousands of years, the Long Barrow at All Cannings, inspired by those built in the Neolithic era, was built on land just outside the village of All Cannings. The barrow was designed to have a large number of private niches within the stone and earth structure to receive cremation urns.

This was followed by new barrows at:

- The Willow Row Barrow at St Neots.
- The Soulton Long Barrow at Soulton in Shropshire.
- Higher Ground Meadow in Dorset
- Mid-England Barrow, Oxfordshire.

Plans have also been announced for a barrow in Milton Keynes and in Powys.

== Sites ==
=== Australia ===
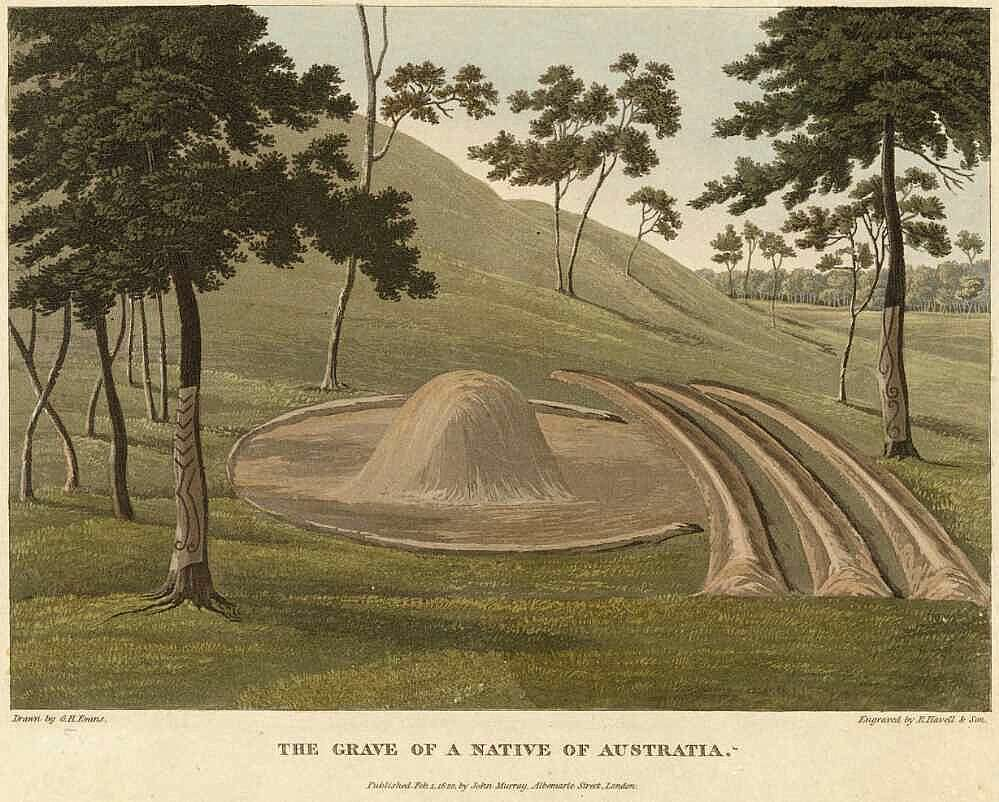
Burial mound, mourning seats and carved trees facing the mound. c. 1820

Burial mounds are one of several funerary forms practiced by Indigenous Australians. Burial mounds were once practiced by some Aboriginal peoples across Australia, with the most elaborate burial mounds recorded in New South Wales, South Australia, Victoria and Western Australia. Most notable burials in New South Wales and Western Australia were studied and excavated by John Oxley (1820), Atkinson (1853), Pearce (1897), and Davidson (1949) and were termed Aboriginal tumulus.

Early records indicate the burial mounds as neat and rounded in form. However, dimensions and precise form could vary widely based on rank of the individuals, smallest mounds being 2 to 3 m in diameter and 2 m in height to largest mounds described as an earthen oblong mound resembling ‘a large hillock some 100 feet long, and 50 in height’. Some special or high-standing individuals mound were semi-circular, while most were round. Traditionally, the preparation of the burial site, the carving of trees facing the mound and internment was done by initiated men. Occasionally, long raised mourning seats were constructed along one side of the burial mound. Many of these mounds today have undergone much change in appearance due to erosion, weathering, wildfires, agriculture, land development and deliberate destruction.

Bodies were buried either in a seated-position or in a crouched fetal-position, they were wrapped in layers of pelt-cloaks. Grave goods often included weapons, stone axes, ochre, white clay, stone flakes, bonepoints, necklaces, gridles, headbands and items of ceremonial clothing.

An early published account of John Oxley's excavation describes a high-standing Aboriginal man's burial mound and associated carved trees; these carvings on the trees were made around the mound, facing the burial.

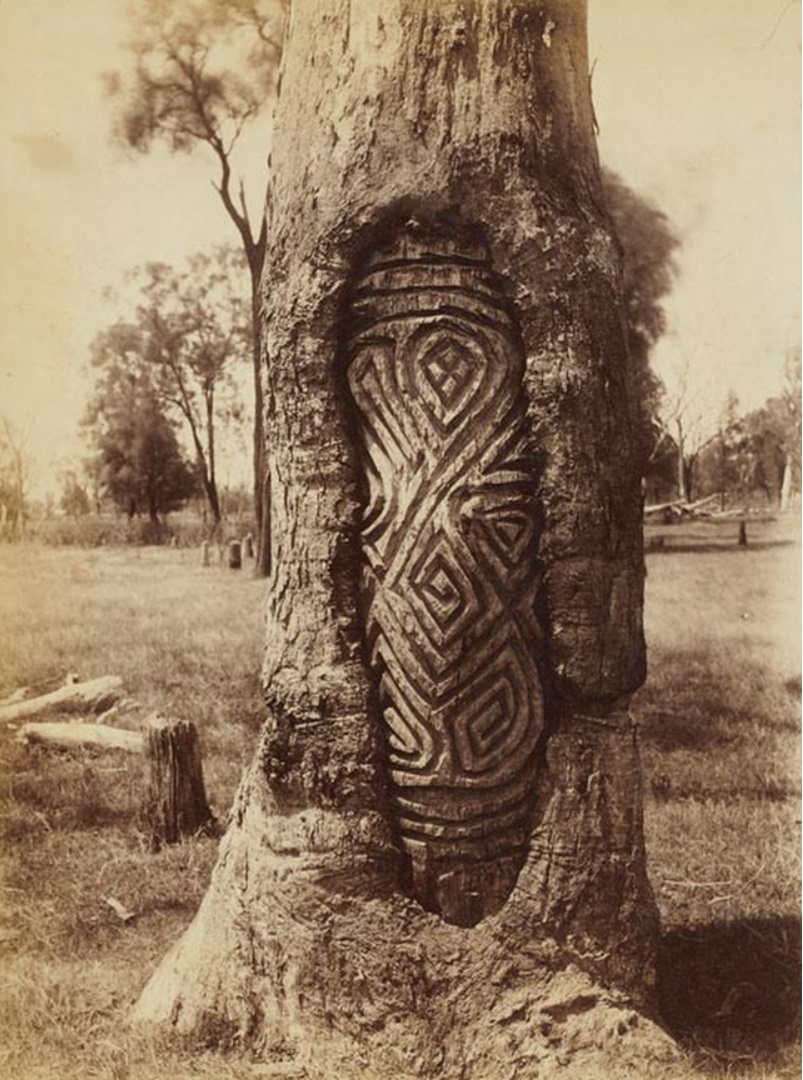
Trees around the burial were carved to face the mound, c. 1889–1894

"The form of the whole was semi-circular. Three rows of seats occupied one half, the grave and an outer row of seats the other; the seats formed segments of circles of fifty, forty-five, and forty feet each, and were formed by the soil being trenched up from between them. The centre part of the grave was about five feet high, and about nine long, forming an oblong pointed cone. On removing the soil from one end of the tumulus, and about two feet beneath the solid surface of the ground, we came to three or four layers of wood, lying across the grave, serving as an arch to bear the weight of the earthy cone or tomb above. On removing one end of those layers, sheet after sheet of dry bark was taken out, then dry grass and leaves in a perfect state of preservation, the wet or damp having apparently never penetrated even to the first covering of wood … the body deposited about four feet deep in an oval grave, four feet long and from eighteen inches to two feet wide. The feet were bent quite up to the head, the arms having been placed between the thighs. The face was downwards, the body being placed east and west, the head to the east. It had been very carefully wrapped in a great number of opossum [sic] skins, the head bound round with the net usually worn by the natives, and also the girdle: it appeared after being enclosed in those skins to have been placed in a larger net, and then deposited in the manner before mentioned … to the west and north of the grave were two cypress-trees distant between fifty and sixty feet; the sides towards the tomb were barked, and curious characters deeply cut upon them, in a manner which, considering the tools they possess, must have been a work of great labour and time."

Traditionally, a sheet of bark was removed from trees and the bare surface was carved to face the burial mound. In some cases, up to five trees were carved around the mound for high standing individuals. It has been suggested that the carvings were associated with the culture heroes admired by man in life and were thought to provide a pathway for his spirit to return to the sky world. According to Alfred William Howitt these carved trees served both as transit points to allow cultural heroes to ascend to, and descend from, the firmament as well as a means for the deceased to return to the sky world.

Some mounds do not contain burials, these mounds are associated with settlement debris. In Northern Territory and in several regions both forms are known. Recently, several mounds in Queensland were investigated with ground-penetrating radar. These mounds were previously associated with settlement debris. Radar study revealed some mounds contained mortuary remains, while other mounds were built over places where ceremonial fires had taken place. Further research is proposed to understand nature of burial mounds in this part of Australia.

=== Africa ===
==== Horn of Africa ====
Salweyn in Northern Somalia contains a very large field of cairns, which stretches for a distance of around 8 km. An excavation of one of these tumuli by Georges Révoil in 1881 uncovered a tomb, beside which were artefacts pointing to an ancient, advanced civilization. The interred objects included pottery shards from Samos, some well-crafted enamels, and a mask of Ancient Greek design.

==== The Sahel ====
The prehistoric tradition of monarchic tumuli-building is shared by both the West African Sahel and the Middle Nile regions. Ancient Egyptian pyramids of the early dynastic period and Meroitic Kush pyramids are recognized by Faraji (2022) as part of and derived from an earlier architectural "Sudanic-Sahelian" tradition of monarchic tumuli, which are characterized as "earthen pyramids" or "proto-pyramids." Faraji (2022) characterized Nobadia as the "last pharaonic culture of the Nile Valley" and described mound tumuli as being "the first architectural symbol of the sovereign's return and reunification with the primordial mound upon his death." Faraji (2022) indicates that there may have been a cultural expectation of "postmortem resurrection" associated with tumuli in the funerary traditions of the West African Sahel (e.g., northern Ghana, northern Nigeria, Mali) and Nile Valley (e.g., Ballana, Qustul, Kerma, Kush). Based on artifacts found in the tumuli from West Africa and Nubia, there may have been "a highly developed corporate ritual in which the family members of the deceased brought various items as offerings and tribute to the ancestors" buried in the tumuli and the tumuli may have "served as immense shrines of spiritual power for the populace to ritualize and remember their connection to the ancestral lineage as consecrated in the royal tomb."

The "Classical Sudanese" monarchic tumuli-building tradition, which lasted in Sudan (e.g., Kerma, Makuria, Meroe, Napata, Nobadia) until the early period of the 6th century CE as well as in West Africa and Central Africa until the 14th century CE, notably preceded the spread of Islam into the West African and Sahelian regions of Africa. According to al-Bakrī, "the construction of tumuli and the accompanying rituals was a religious endeavor that emanated from the other elements" that he described, such as "sorcerers, sacred groves, idols, offerings to the dead, and the "tombs of their kings."" Faraji (2022) indicated that the early dynastic period of ancient Egypt, Kerma of Kush, and the Nobadian culture of Ballana were similar to al-Bakrī's descriptions of the Mande tumuli practices of ancient Ghana. In the Inland Niger Delta, 11th century CE and 15th century CE tumuli at El Oualedji and Koï Gourrey contained various bones (e.g., human, horse), human items (e.g., beads, bracelets, rings), and animal items (e.g., bells, harnesses, plaques). Cultural similarities were also found with a Malinke king of Gambia, who along with his senior queen, human subjects within his kingdom, and his weapons, were buried in his home under a large mound the size of the house, as described by V. Fernandes. Levtzion also acknowledged the cultural similarities between the monarchic tumuli-building traditions and practices (e.g., monumental Senegambian megaliths) of West Africa, such as Senegambia, Inland Niger Delta, and Mali, and the Nile Valley; these monarchic tumuli-building practices span the Sudanian savanna as manifestations of a trans-Sahelian common culture and heritage. From the 5th millennium BCE to the 14th century CE, earthen and stone tumuli were developed between Senegambia and Chad. Among 10,000 burial mounds in Senegambia, 3,000 megalithic burial mounds in Senegambia were constructed between 200 BCE and 100 CE, and 7,000 earthen burial mounds in Senegal were constructed in the 2nd millennium CE. Between 1st century CE and 15th century CE, megalithic monuments without tumuli were constructed. Megalithic and earthen Senegambian tumuli, which may have been constructed by the Wolof people (Serer people) or Sosse people (Mande peoples). Sudanese tumuli (e.g., Kerma, C-Group), which date to the mid-3rd millennium BCE, share cultural similarities with Senegambian tumuli. Between the 6th century CE and 14th century CE, stone tumuli circles, which at a single site usually encircle a burial site of half-meter that is covered by a burial mound, were constructed in Komaland; the precursors for this 3rd millennium BCE tumuli style of Komaland, Ghana and Senegambia are regarded by Faraji (2022) to be Kerma Kush and the A-Group culture of ancient Nubia. While the stele-circled burial mounds of C-Group culture of Nubia are regarded as precursors for the megalithic burial mounds of Senegambia, Kerma tumuli are regarded as precursors for the stone tumuli circles of Komaland. The tumuli of Durbi Takusheyi, which have been dated between the 13th century CE and the 16th century CE, may have connection to tumuli from Ballana and Makuria. Tumuli have also been found at Kissi, in Burkina Faso, and at Daima, in Nigeria.

In Niger, there are two monumental tumuli – a cairn burial (5695 BP – 5101 BP) at Adrar Bous, and a tumulus covered with gravel (6229 BP – 4933 BP) at Iwelen, in the Aïr Mountains. Tenerians did not construct the two monumental tumuli at Adrar Bous and Iwelen. Rather, Tenerians constructed cattle tumuli at a time before the two monumental tumuli were constructed.

The Tichitt Tradition of eastern Mauritania dates from 2200 BC to 200 BC. Within the settled areas of Tichitt Culture (e.g., Dhar Tichitt, Dhar Tagant, Dhar Walata), with stone walls, which vary in scale from (e.g., 2 hectares, 80 hectares), there were walled agricultural land used for livestock or gardening as well as land with granaries and tumuli. Based on the hundreds of tumuli present in Dhar Tichitt, compared to a dozen tumuli present in Dhar Walata, it is likely that Dhar Tichitt was the primary center of religion for the people of Tichitt culture.

At Wanar, Senegal, megalithic monolith-circles and tumuli (1300/1100 BC – 1400/1500 AD) were constructed by West Africans who had a complex hierarchical society. In the mid-region of the Senegal River Valley, the Serer people may have created tumuli (before 13th century AD), shell middens (7th century AD – 13th century AD) in the central-west region, and shell middens (200 BC – Present) in the southern region. The funerary tumuli-building tradition of West Africa was widespread and a regular practice amid 1st millennium AD. More than ten thousand large funerary tumuli exist in Senegal.

At the Inner Niger Delta, in the Mali Lakes Region, there are two monumental tumuli constructed in the time period of the Trans-Saharan trade for the Sahelian kingdoms of West Africa. The El Oualadji monumental tumulus, which dates between 1030 AD and 1220 AD and has two human remains buried with horse remains and various items (e.g., horse harnesses, horse trappings with plaques and bells, bracelets, rings, beads, iron items), may have been, as highlighted by al-Bakri, the royal burial site of a king from the Ghana Empire. The Koï Gourrey monumental tumulus, which may date prior to 1326 AD and has over twenty human remains that were buried with various items (e.g., iron accessories, an abundant amount of copper bracelets, anklets and beads, an abundant amount of broken, but whole pottery, another set of distinct, intact, glazed pottery, a wooden-beaded bone necklace, a bird figurine, a lizard figurine, a crocodile figurine), and is situated within the Mali Empire.

==== Sahara ====
The Sahara contains hundreds of thousands of tumuli and flatter burial monuments that come in a wide variety of forms. These monuments are usually found in areas with sparse vegetation. As a result, they are clearly visible, even on high-resolution satellite images, so that today at least the larger burial monuments of the Sahara have been mapped by scientists.

Preceded by assumed earlier sites in the Eastern Sahara, tumuli with megalithic monuments developed as early as 4700 BC in the Saharan region of Niger. Fekri Hassan (2002) indicates that the megalithic monuments in the Saharan region of Niger and the Eastern Sahara may have served as antecedents for the mastabas and pyramids of ancient Egypt.

=== Asia ===
==== Central Asia ====
The word kurgan is of Turkic origin, and derives from Proto-Turkic *Kur- ("to erect (a building), to establish"). In Ukraine and Russia, there are royal kurgans of Varangian chieftains, such as the Black Grave in Ukrainian Chernihiv (excavated in the 19th century), Oleg's Grave in Russian Staraya Ladoga, and vast, intricate Rurik's Hill near Russian Novgorod. Other important kurgans are found in Ukraine and South Russia and are associated with much more ancient steppe peoples, notably the Scythians (e.g., Chortomlyk, Pazyryk) and early Indo-Europeans (e.g., Ipatovo kurgan) The steppe cultures found in Ukraine and South Russia naturally continue into Central Asia, in particular Kazakhstan.

It is constructed over a grave, often characterized by containing a single human body along with grave vessels, weapons and horses. Originally in use on the Pontic–Caspian steppe, kurgans spread into much of Central Asia and Eastern, Southeast, Western and Northern Europe during the 3rd millennium BC.

The earliest kurgans date to the 4th millennium BC in the Caucasus, and researchers associate these with the Indo-Europeans. Kurgans were built in the Eneolithic, Bronze, Iron, Antiquity and Middle Ages, with ancient traditions still active in Southern Siberia and Central Asia.

==== Near East ====
===== Turkey =====
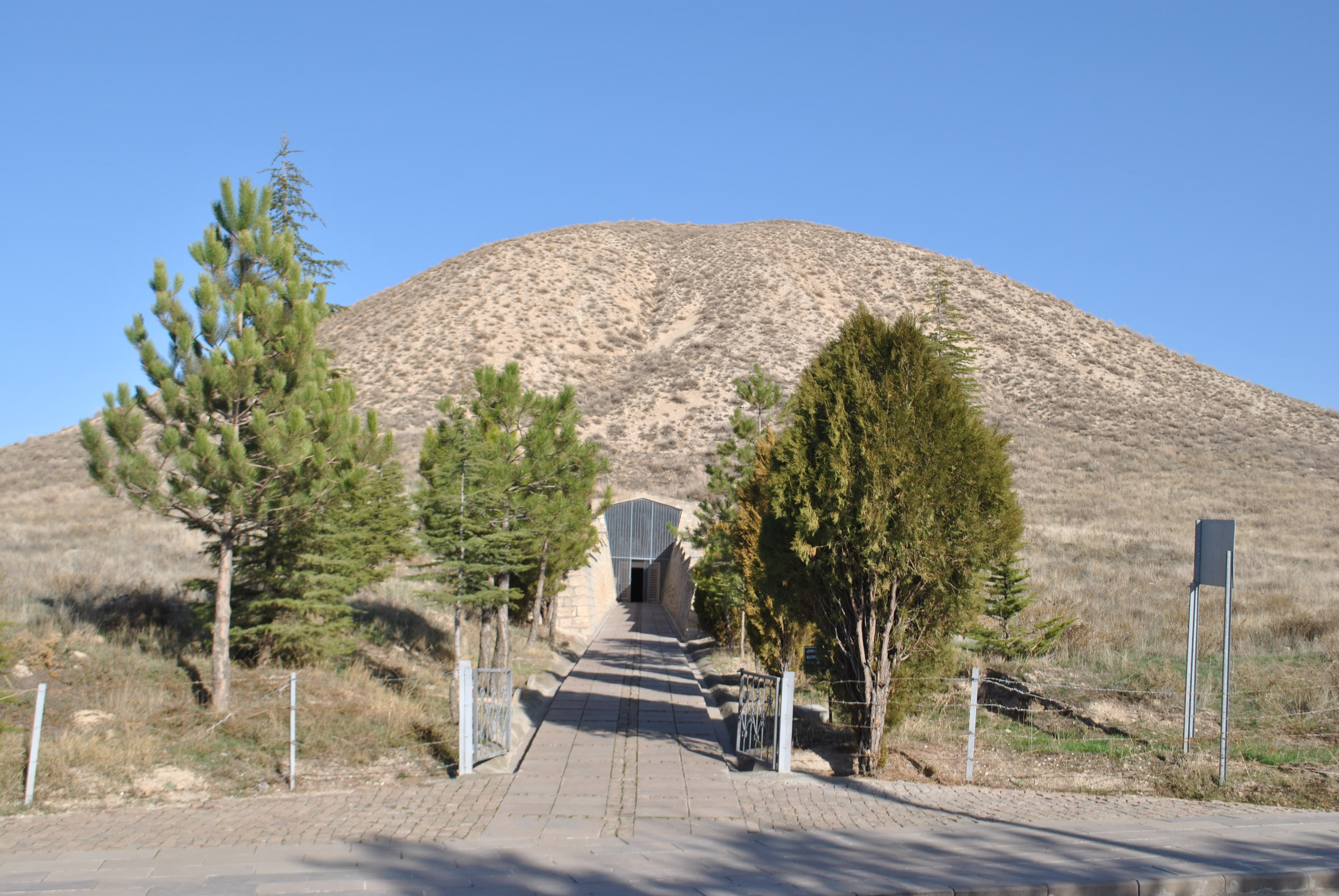
The "Tomb of Midas" in Gordion, dated 740 BC.

On the Anatolian peninsula, there are several sites where one can find the biggest specimens of these artificial mounds throughout the world. Three of these sites are especially important. Bin Tepe (and other Lydian mounds of the Aegean inland), Phrygian mounds in Gordium (Central Anatolia), and the famous Commagene tumulus on Mount Nemrut (Southeastern Anatolia).

This is the most important of the enumerated sites with the number of specimens it has and with the dimensions of certain among them. It is in the Aegean inland of Turkey. The site is called "Bintepeler" or "Bin Tepe" (a thousand mounds in Turkish) and it is in the northwest of Salihli district of Manisa province. The site is very close to the southern shoreline of Lake Marmara (Lake Gyges or Gygaea). Bin Tepeler is a Lydian necropolis that dates back to 7th and 6th centuries BC. These mounds are called "the pyramids of Anatolia", as a giant specimen among them is 355 metres in diameter, 1115 metres in perimeter and 69 metres high. According to Herodotus, this giant tumulus belongs to the famous Lydian King Alyattes who ruled between 619 and 560 BC. There is also another mound belonging to King Gyges. The Gyges mound was excavated but the burial chamber has not been found yet. On this site, there are 75 tumuli dating back to Lydian period that belong to the nobility. A large number of smaller artificial mounds can also be observed on the site. There are other Lydian tumuli sites around Eşme district of Uşak province. Certain mounds on these sites had been plundered by raiders in the late 1960s, and the Lydian treasures found in their burial chambers were smuggled to the United States, which later returned them to Turkish authorities after negotiations. These artifacts are now exhibited in the Archaeological Museum of Uşak.

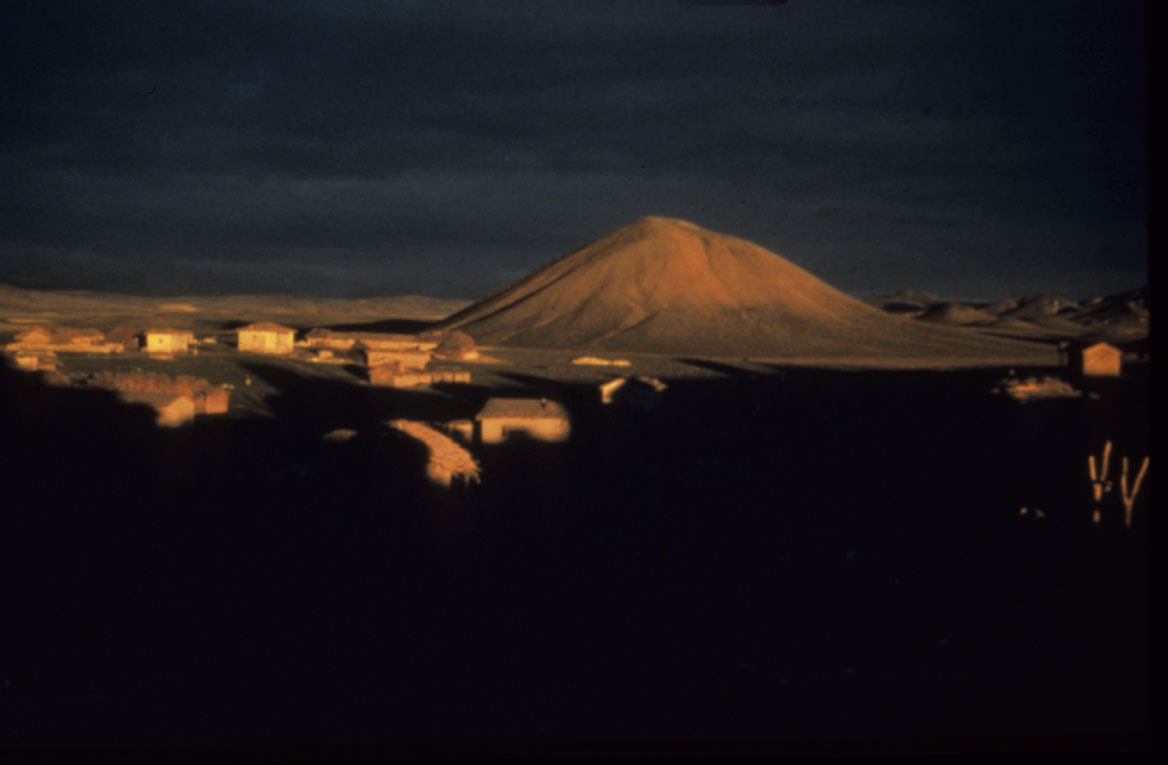
Tumulus MM, Gordion, at sunset

Gordium (Gordion) was the capital of the ancient kingdom of Phrygia. Its ruins are in the immediate vicinity of Polatlı, near the Turkish capital Ankara. At this site, approximately 80–90 tumuli date back to the Phrygian, Persian and Hellenistic periods. Around 35 tumuli have been excavated so far, ranging in date from the 8th century BC to the 3rd or 2nd century BC. The biggest tumulus at the site is believed to have covered the burial of the famous Phrygian King Midas or that of his father. This mound, called Tumulus MM (for "Midas Mound"), was excavated in 1957 by a team from the University of Pennsylvania Museum, led by Rodney Young and his graduate students. Among the many fine bronze artifacts recovered from the wooden burial chamber were 170 bronze vessels, including numerous "omphalos bowls", and more than 180 bronze "Phrygian fibulae" (ancient safety pins). The wooden furniture found in the tomb is especially noteworthy, as wood seldom survives from archaeological contexts: the collection included nine tables, one of them elaborately carved and inlaid, and two ceremonial serving stands inlaid with religious symbols and geometric patterns. Important bronze and wooden artifacts were also found in other tumulus burials at the site.

Mount Nemrut is 86 km in the east of Adıyaman province of Turkey. It is very close to Kahta district of the same province. The mountain has, at its peak, 3050 metres of height above sea level. A tumulus that dates to the 1st century BC is at the peak of the mountain. This artificial mound has 150 metres in diameter and a height of 50 metres, which was originally 55 metres. It belongs to the Commagene King Antiochus I Theos of Commagene who ruled between 69 and 40 BC. This tumulus is made of broken stone pieces, which renders excavation attempts almost impossible. The tumulus is surrounded by ceremonial terraces in the east, west, and north. The east and west terraces have tremendous statues (reaching 8 to 10 meters in height) and bas reliefs of gods and goddesses from the Commagene pantheon where divine figures used to embody the Persian and Roman perceptions together.

===== Bahrain =====
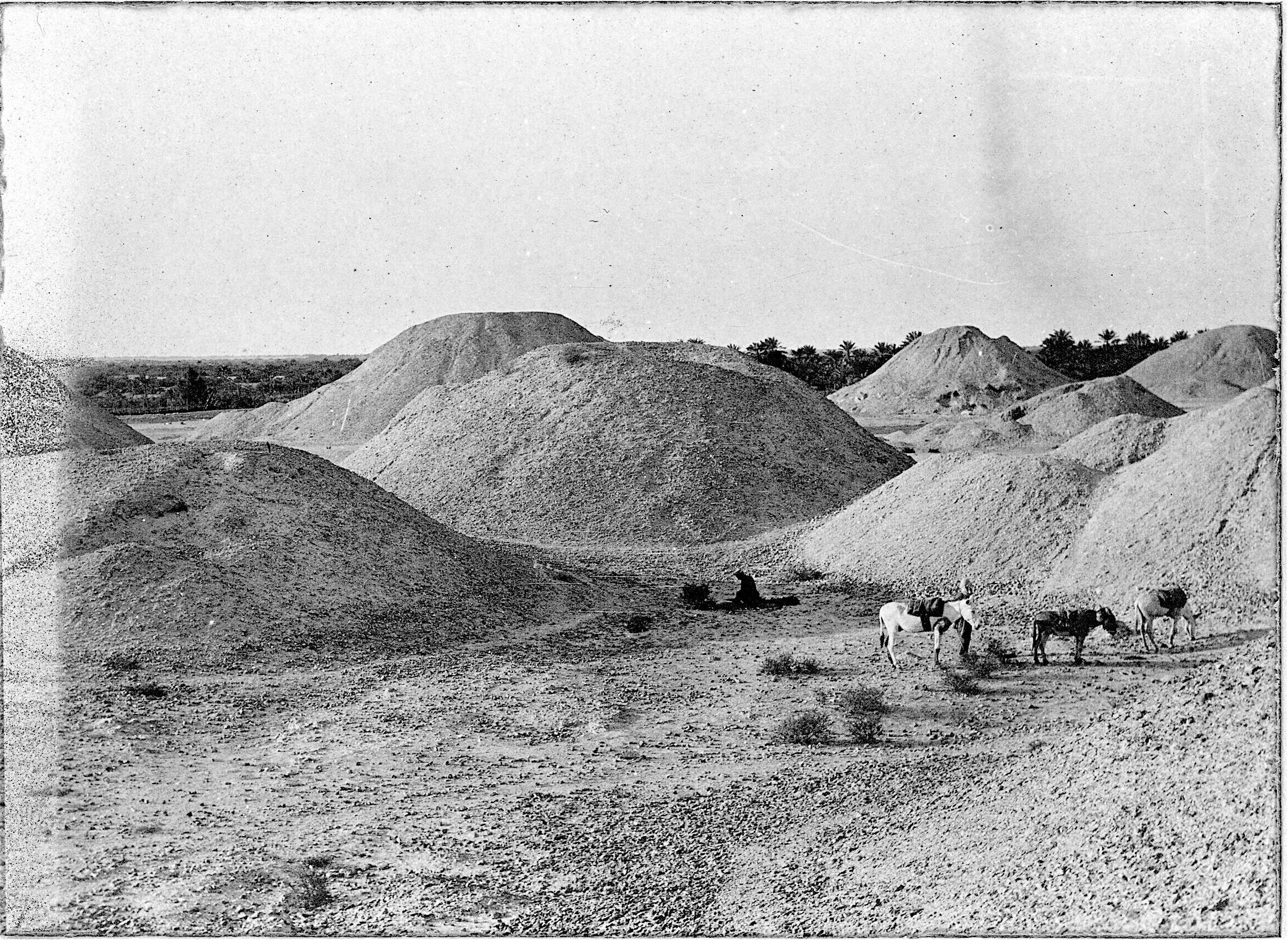
Dilmun Burial Mounds in Bahrain.

The Dilmun Burial Mounds comprise necropolis areas on the main island of Bahrain dating back to the Dilmun civilization and the Umm al-Nar culture.

Each of the tumuli is composed of a central stone chamber that is enclosed by a low ring-wall and covered by earth and gravel. The size of the mounds varies, but the majority of them measure 15 by 30 ft (4.5 by 9 m) in diameter and are 3–6 ft (1–2 m) high. The smaller mounds usually contain only one chamber. The chambers are usually rectangular with one or two alcoves at the northeast end. Occasionally there are additional pairs of alcoves along the middle of the larger chambers.

Although the chambers usually contained one burial each, some contain several people and the secondary chambers often contain none. The deceased were generally laid with their heads in the alcove end of the chamber and lying on their right sides. The bodies were accompanied by few items. There were a few pieces of pottery and occasionally shell or stone stamp seals, baskets sealed with asphalt, ivory objects, stone jars, and copper weapons. The skeletons are representative of both sexes with a life expectancy of approximately 40 years. Babies were generally buried at and outside the ring-wall. The average number of children per family was 1.6 persons.

===== Syria, Palestine and Israel =====
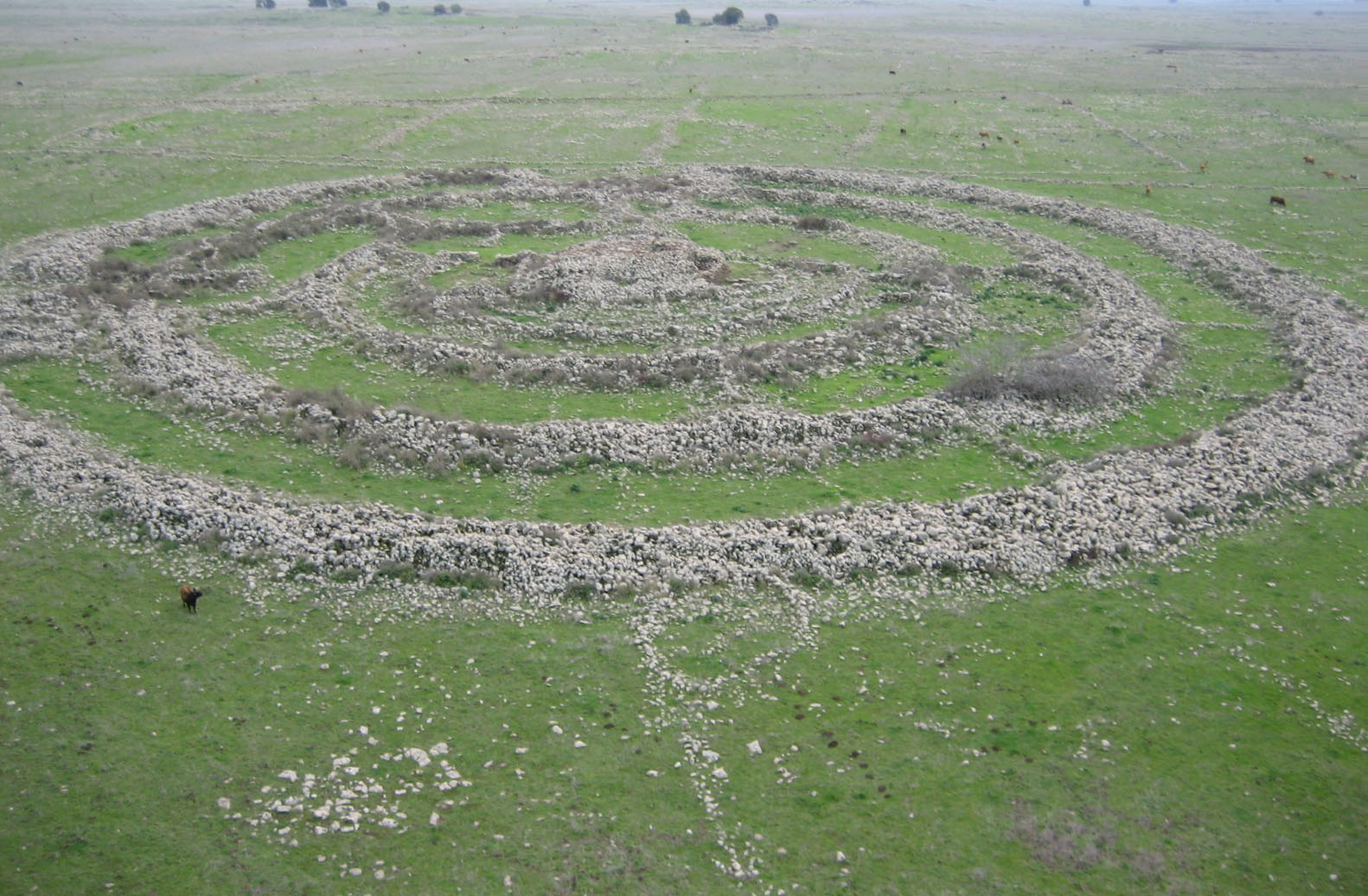
Rujm el-Hiri, Golan Heights, Syria

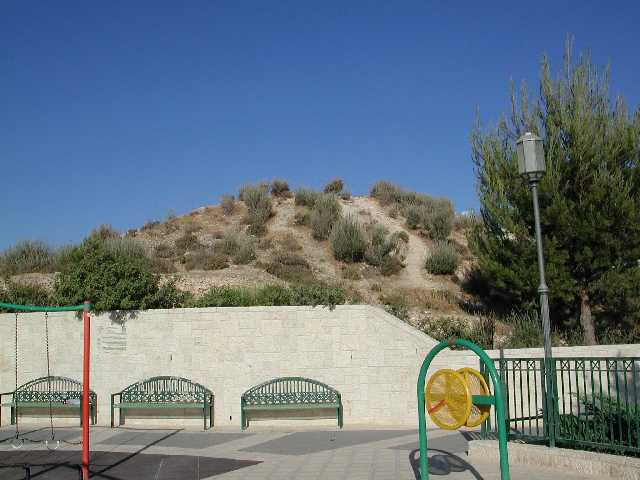
Jerusalem tumulus #2 in 2004

A tumulus forms the center of the ancient megalithic structure of Rujm el-Hiri in Golan Heights, Syria. Rujm in Arabic can mean tumulus, cairn or stone heap. Dating from the 4th or 3rd millennium, the megalithic structure is also known as the “Wheel of Ghosts,” or the “Wheel of Giants,” and some have even called it “Stonehenge of the East”. It previously was thought to be a prehistoric astronomical observatory, however more recent research challenges that theory.

Near the western city limits of modern Jerusalem, 19 tumuli have been documented (Amiran, 1958). Though first noticed in the 1870s by early surveyors, the first one to be formally documented was Tumulus #2 in 1923 by William Foxwell Albright, and the most recent one (Tumulus #4) was excavated by Gabriel Barkay in 1983. These tumuli are sometimes associated with the Judean kings who ruled Jerusalem, but no such connection has yet been substantiated, nor have any inscriptions naming any specific Judean king been excavated from a tumulus. More than half of these ancient Israelite structures have now been threatened or obliterated by modern construction projects, including Tumulus #4, which was excavated hastily in a salvage operation. The most noteworthy finds from this dig were two LMLK seal impressions and two other handles with associated concentric circle incisions, all of which suggests this tumulus belonged to either King Hezekiah or his son Manasseh.

==== South Asia ====
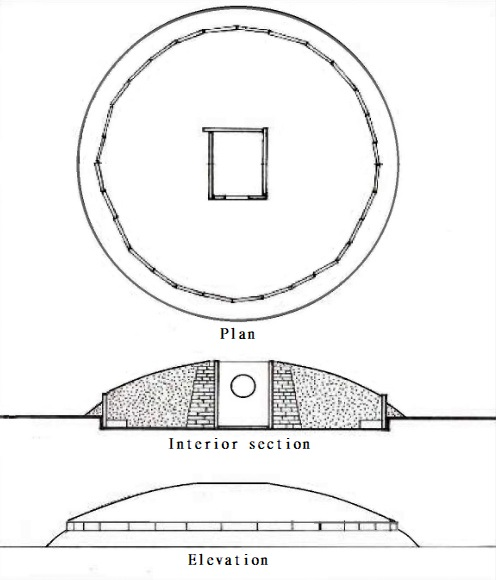
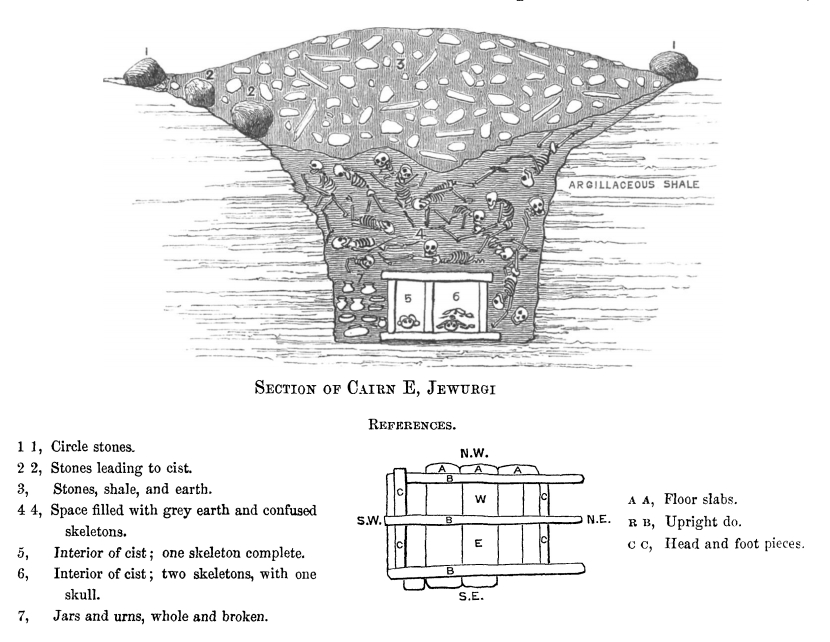
Types of Megalithic mound burials with chambers, India.

===== India =====
Round mound burials are associated with megalithic burials in India. Most megalithic mounds with chambers found today have been disturbed over centuries and their original form was badly disturbed. Examination of other lesser disturbed monuments shows that the chamber was surrounded by a packing of earth, chipped rubble blocks and covered on the outside with inclined stone slabs whose top ends rested on the periphery of the capstone creating a mound. These pre-historic megalithic mound burials with chambers likely influenced later devolvement of mound burials called "Stupa" mounds, Similarities of the stupa with early megalithic mounds are noted with structural and functional features of the stupa (including its general mound shape and the practice of surrounding stupas with a stone, relic chamber, or wooden railing) with both pre-Mauryan era cairns and pre-historic megalithic "round mound" burials with chambers found in India, which likely represents a "proto-stupa".

In Dholavira, an archaeological site associated with Indus Valley Civilization, there are several large and high "hemispherical monuments" mounds with brick masonry found with burial chambers inside. Among them, Tumulus-1 and Tumulus-2 mounds were excavated. They consist of a deep and wide rock-cut chamber, surrounded on the ground by a massive circular mud-brick structure made in two tiers, and filled in and topped with random earth to form a domical shape. There is also evidence of plastering on the exterior of Tumulus-1 mound, bearing a 10- mm thick plaster of pinkish-white clay over brick masonry. The offering in Tumulus-1 consisted of one full necklace of steatite stringed in a copper wire with hooks for interlocking, solid gold bangle with incurved ends, ageta and gold beads, along with a considerable assemblage of pottery.

Another type of mound burial is Maidam in Assam, India. The Ahom kingdom in medieval Assam built octagonal-shaped tumuli called Maidams for their kings and high officials. The kings were buried in a hillock at Charaideo in Sibsagar district of Assam, whereas other Maidams are found scattered more widely.

===== Pakistan =====
The damb was a type of mound, or small stone structure, found in Balochistan, including the coastal areas of Makran.

==== East Asia ====
===== China =====
The Chinese pyramids house the remains of some of China's former emperors.

Before the expansion of Shang and Zhou culture through the region, many hundreds of tumuli were also constructed by the "Baiyue" peoples of the Yangtze Valley and southeastern China.

===== Japan =====
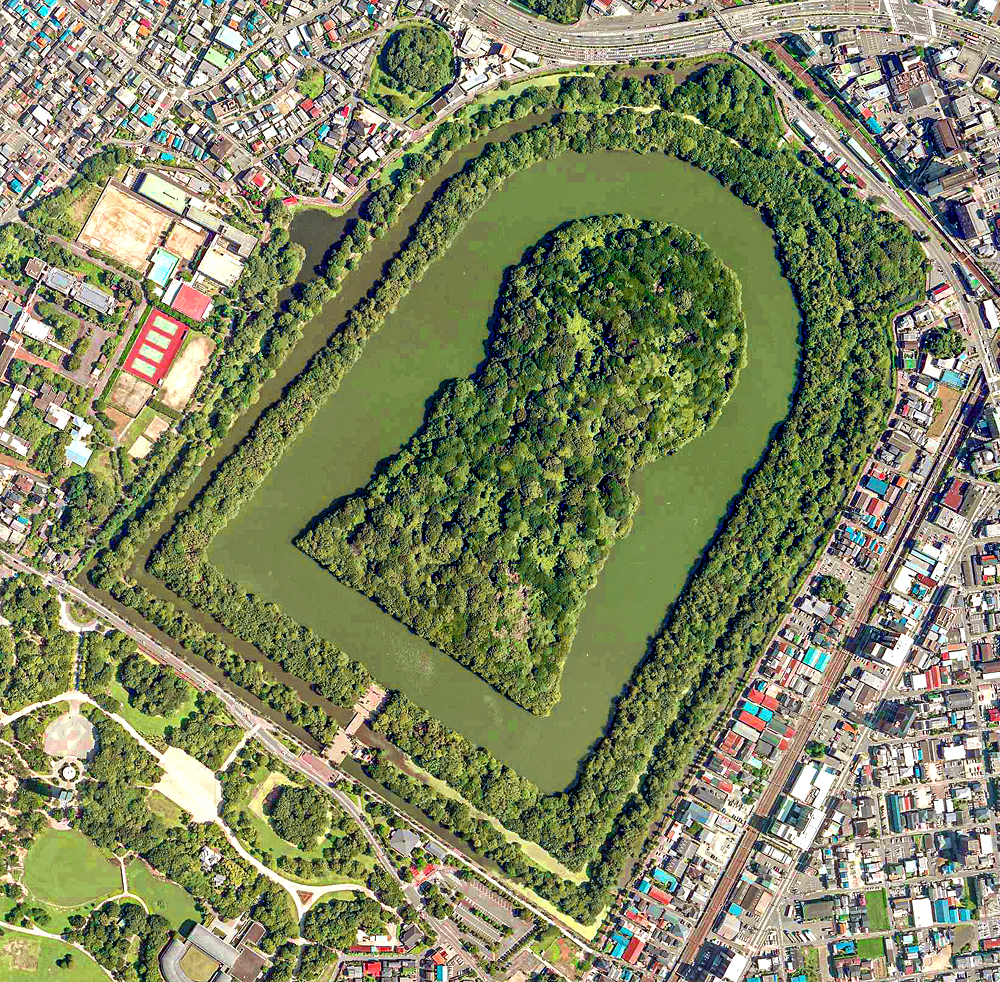
Daisen Kofun, the largest of all kofun

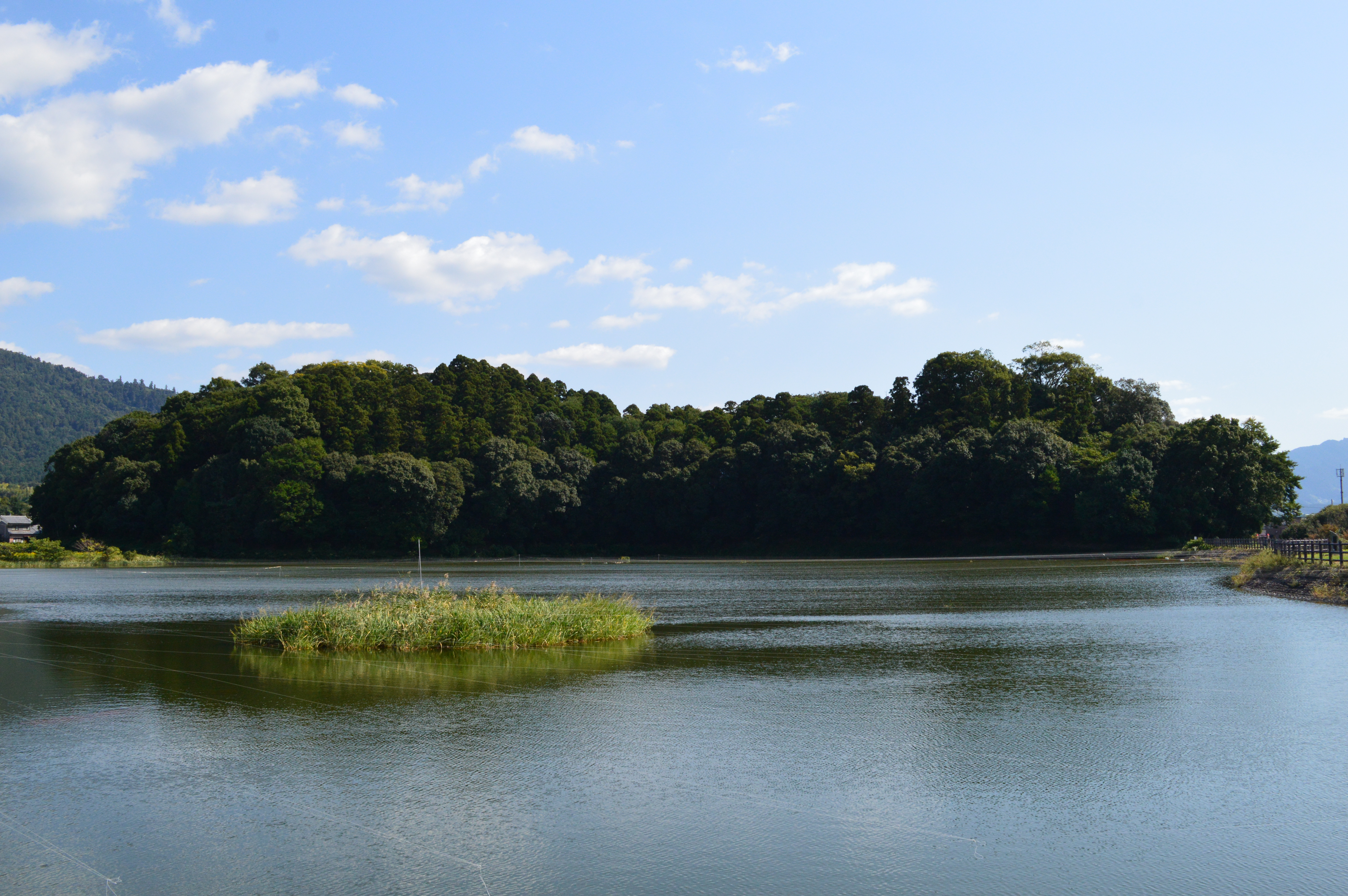
Hashihaka Kofun, Sakurai, Nara, 3rd century AD

In Japan, powerful leaders built tumuli, known as kofun. The Kofun period of Japanese history takes its name from these burial mounds. The largest is Daisen-ryo Kofun, or more commonly Nintoku-ryo Kofun, with a length of 840 metres. In addition to other shapes, kofun includes a keyhole shape, typically seen in Daisen Kofun. Foreign museums possess some grave goods.

===== Korea =====
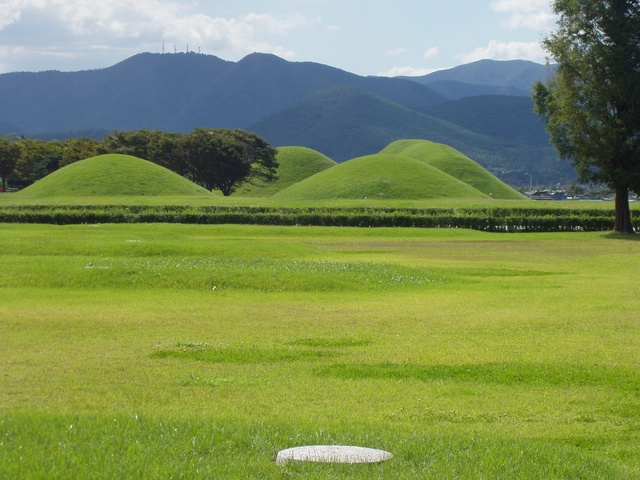
Burial mounds of the Silla kings in Korea

The first burial mounds in Korea were dolmens, which contained material from cultures of the 1st millennium AD, such as bronze-ware, pottery, and other symbols of the society elite. The most famous tumuli in Korea, dating around 300 AD, are those left behind by the Korean Baekje, Goguryeo (Kogyuro/Koguryo), Silla and Gaya states and are clustered around ancient capital cities in modern-day Pyongyang, Ji'an, Jilin, Seoul and Gyeongju. The Goguryeo tombs, shaped like pyramids, are famous for the well-preserved wall murals like the ones at Anak Tomb No. 3, which depict the culture and artistry of the people. The base of the tomb of King Gwanggaeto is 85 meters on each side, half of the size of the Great Pyramids. Goguryeo Silla tombs are most noted for the fabulous offerings that have been excavated such as delicate golden crowns and glassware and beads that probably made their way to Korea via the Silk Road.

=== Europe ===
==== Southeast Europe ====
===== Albania =====
Tumuli are one of the most prominent types of prehistoric monuments spread throughout northern and southern Albania. Some well-known local tumuli are:

- Kamenica Tumulus
- Lofkënd Tumulus
- Pazhok Tumulus

===== Bosnia and Herzegovina =====
More than 50 burial mounds were found in Kupres. Man from Kupres – the skeleton found in one of the tumuli is believed to be more than 3000 years old and it is kept in Gorica museum in Livno. Glasinac has many tumuli. During the Bronze and Iron Age it was a place of strong Glasinac culture, who buried their dead in tumulus.

===== Bulgaria =====
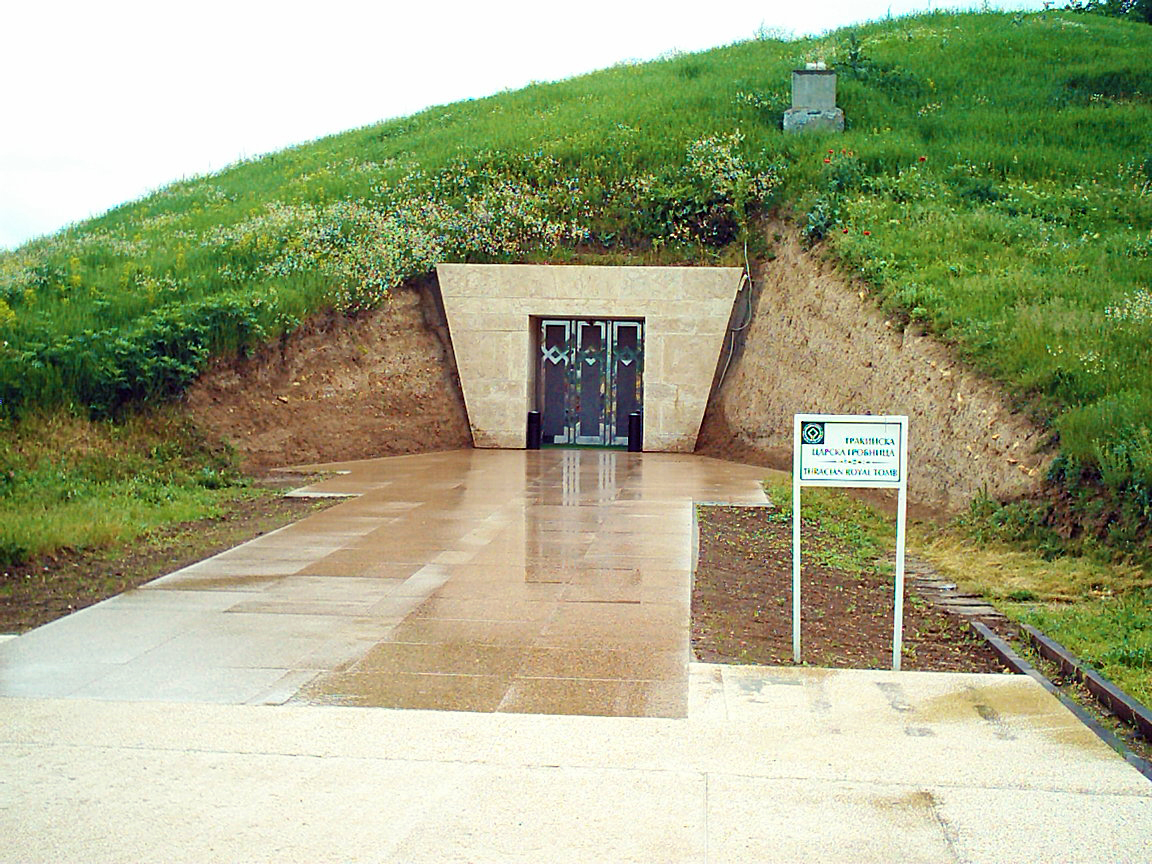
The entrance to the tomb (or temple) mound of Sveshtari

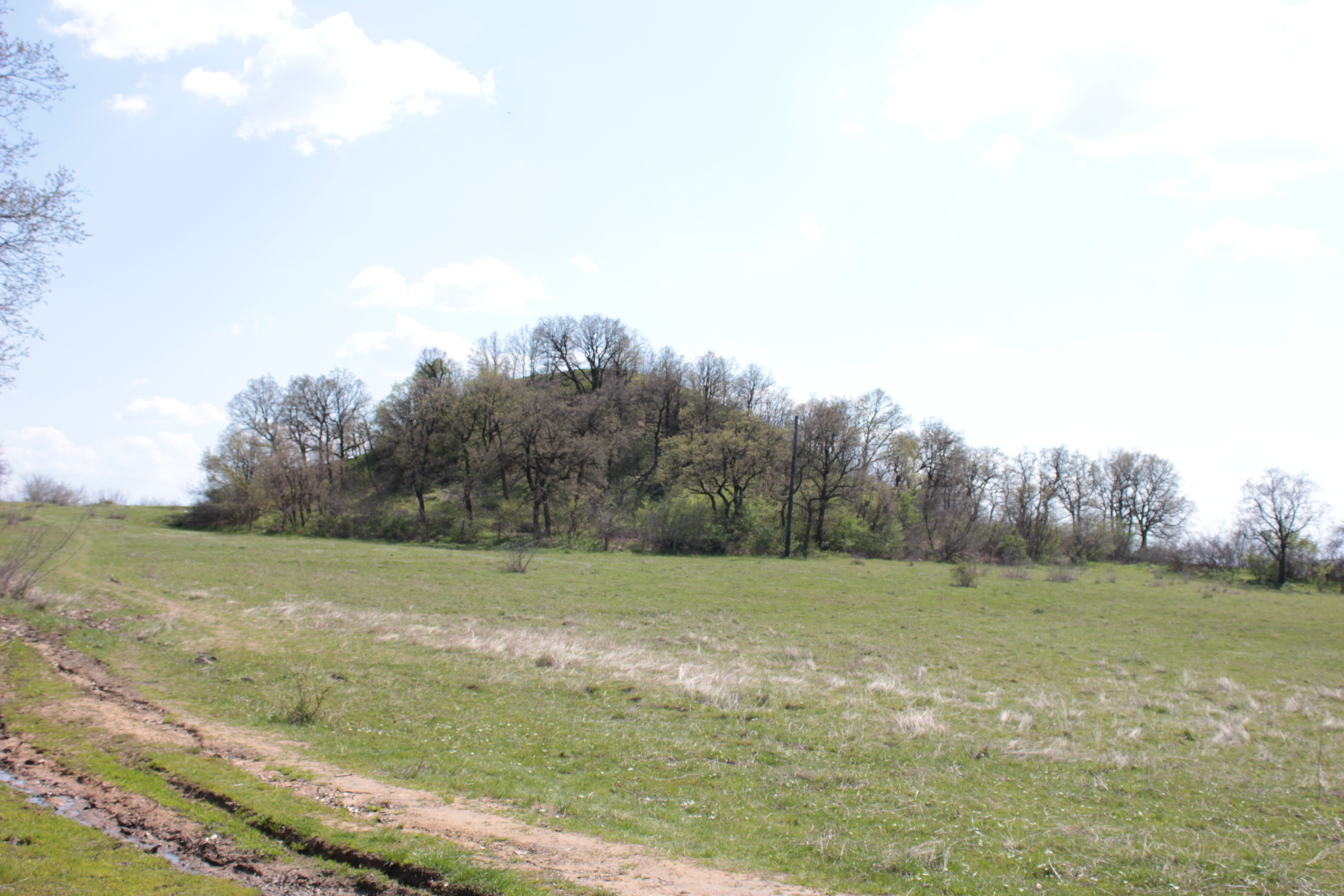
Alexandrovo burial mound

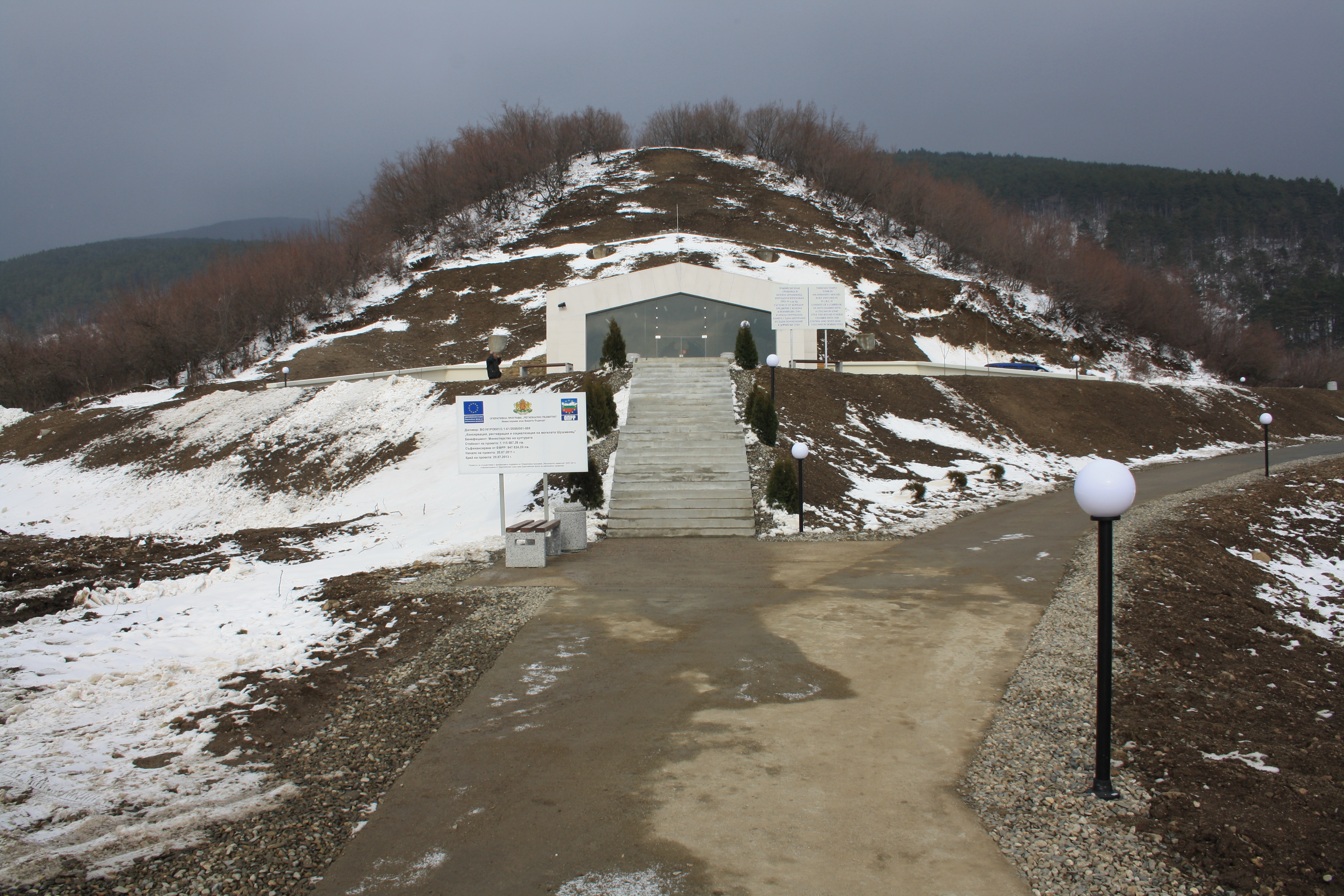
Thracian tomb (or temple) Shushmanets

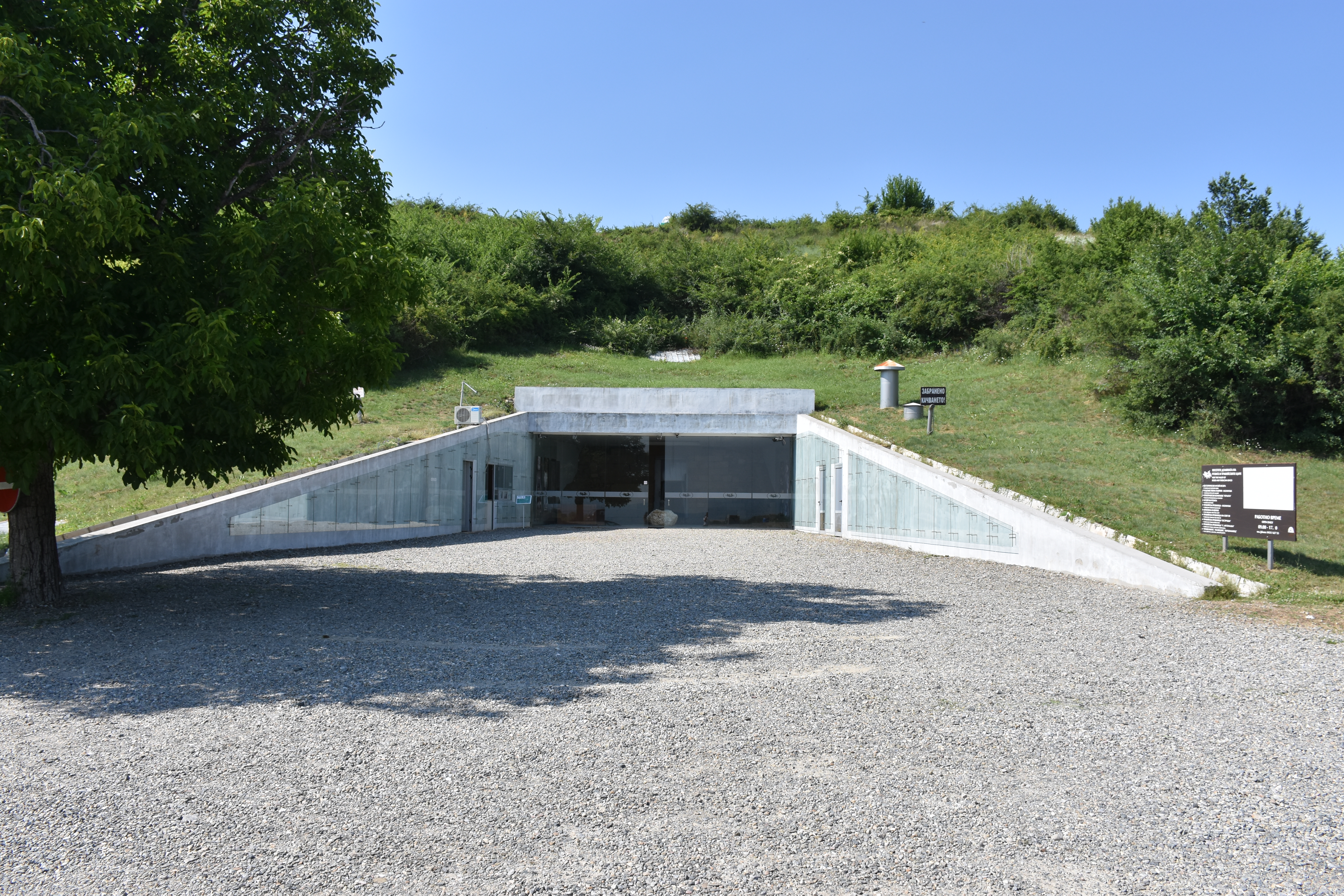
Thracian tomb of Seuthes III (Goliama Kosmatka)

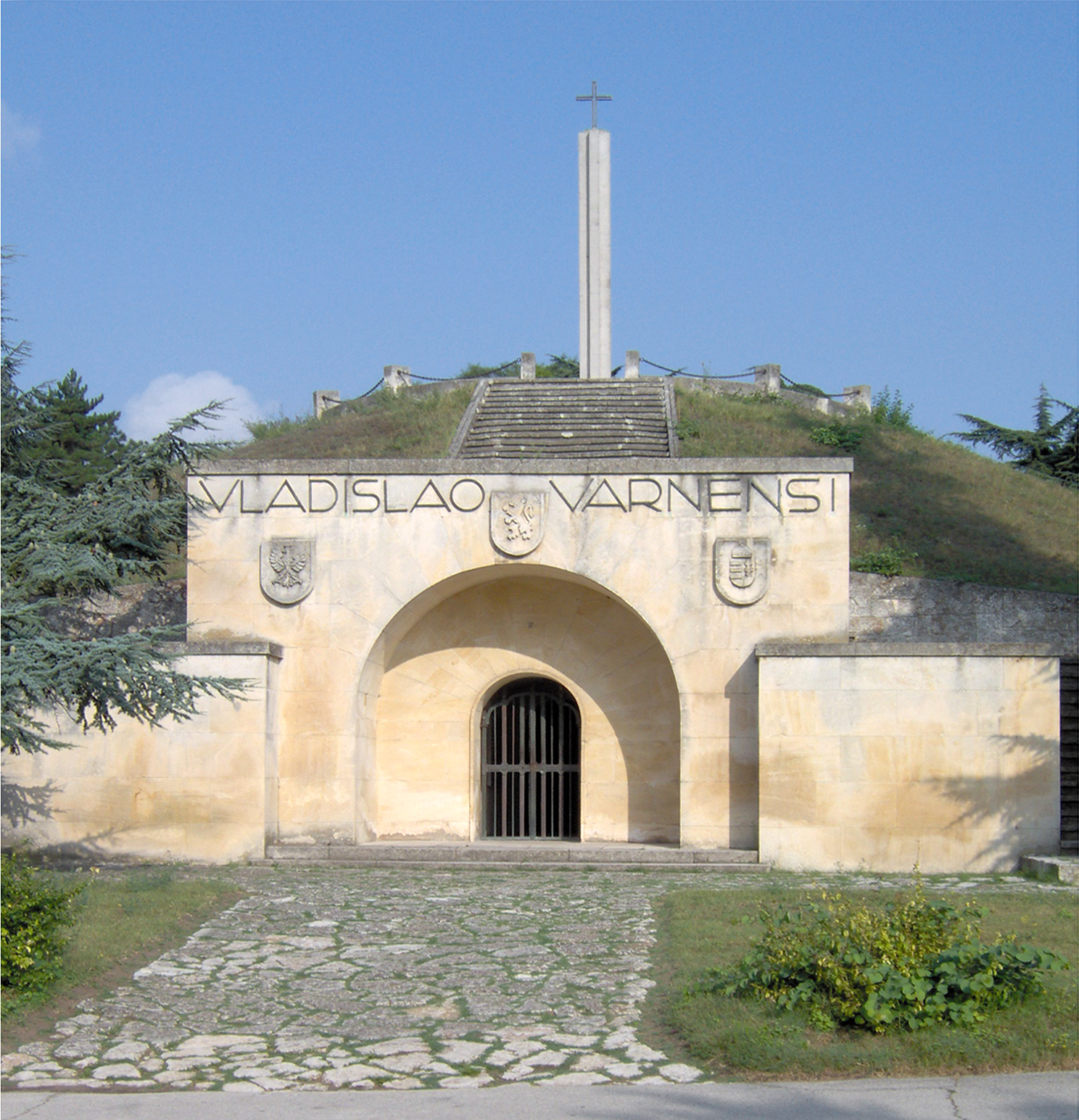
Memorial of the Battle of Varna dedicated to Władysław III of Poland, dug into an ancient Thracian tumulus

On the territory of Bulgaria there are over 60,000 ancient Thracian mounds, of which only about 1,000 have been studied. There are also Roman and Thraco-Roman burial tombs. Those tumuli over ancient tombs, temples and sanctuaries are found throughout the whole territory of Bulgaria. Some of the world's most significant and famous being the Kazanlak and Sveshtari tombs, UNESCO World Heritage sites. Located near the ancient Thracian capital cities of Seuthopolis (of the Odrysian kingdom) and Daosdava or Helis (of the Getae), perhaps they represented royal burials. Other notable tumuli are the Thracian tomb of Aleksandrovo, Thracian tomb Golyama Arsenalka, Thracian tomb Shushmanets, Thracian tomb Griffins, Thracian tomb Helvetia, Thracian tomb Ostrusha, Tomb of Seuthes III and the other tombs around Starosel, others contained offerings such as the Panagyurishte and Rogozen treasures. Some of the sites are located in the Valley of the Thracian Rulers. The mound of the Tomb of Seuthes III "Golyama Kosmatka" is among the largest mounds in Thrace, with a maximum height of 23 m. and a diameter of 130 m.

===== Croatia =====
There are thousands of tumuli throughout all Croatia, built of stone (Croatian: gomila, gromila) in the karst areas (by the Adriatic Sea) or made of earth (Croatian: humak) in the inland plains and hills. Most of these prehistoric structures were built in the 2nd and 1st millennium BC, from the middle Bronze Age to the end of the Iron Age, by the Illyrians or their direct ancestors in the same place; the Liburnian inhumation of dead under tumuli was certainly inherited from the earlier times, as early as the Copper Age. Smaller tumuli were used as the burial mounds, while bigger (some up to 7 metres high with 60 metres long base) were the cenotaphs (empty tombs) and ritual places.

===== Greece =====
Some of the world's most prominent Tumuli, the Macedonian tombs and a cist-grave at Vergina include the tomb of Philip II (359–336 BC), father of Alexander the Great (336–323 BC), as well as the tomb of Alexander IV (323–309 BC), son of Alexander the Great. A very large tumulus has been discovered in Amphipolis. Known as the Kasta Tomb, the tomb's occupant is presently unknown. Also numerous Mycenaean Greek Tombs are in all essence Tumuli, notably Agamemnon's site in Mycenae, and other sites in Tiryns, near Olympia and Pylos, and mostly in the Peloponnese peninsula near Mycenaean sites and Bronze Age settlements. Moreover, in Central Greece there are numerous Tumuli, some excavated, others not. A notable one is in Marathon, serving as a burial for the ones who fell during battle.

As of October 2014 there are ongoing excavations at the Kasta Tomb in Amphipolis, Macedonia, Greece with the tumulus having a perimeter of 497 meters. The tomb within is assessed to be an ancient Macedonian burial monument of the last quarter of the 4th century BC.

- Macedonian Tombs, Korinos
- Macedonian Tombs, Katerini

===== Hungary =====
There are over 40,000 tumuli in the Great Hungarian Plain; the highest is Gödény-halom, near the settlement of Békésszentandrás in Békés county.

Sírhalom origins and forms are diverse: tells, graves, border barrows, watcher barrows.

===== Serbia =====
- Mrčajevci, several prehistoric tumuli
- Bukovac, Illyrian tumuli and necropolis
- Five prehistoric tumuli in the Morava valley.
- Gromile, Serbian tumuli in Ravna Gora.
- Kinđa

==== Western and Central Europe ====
===== Austria =====
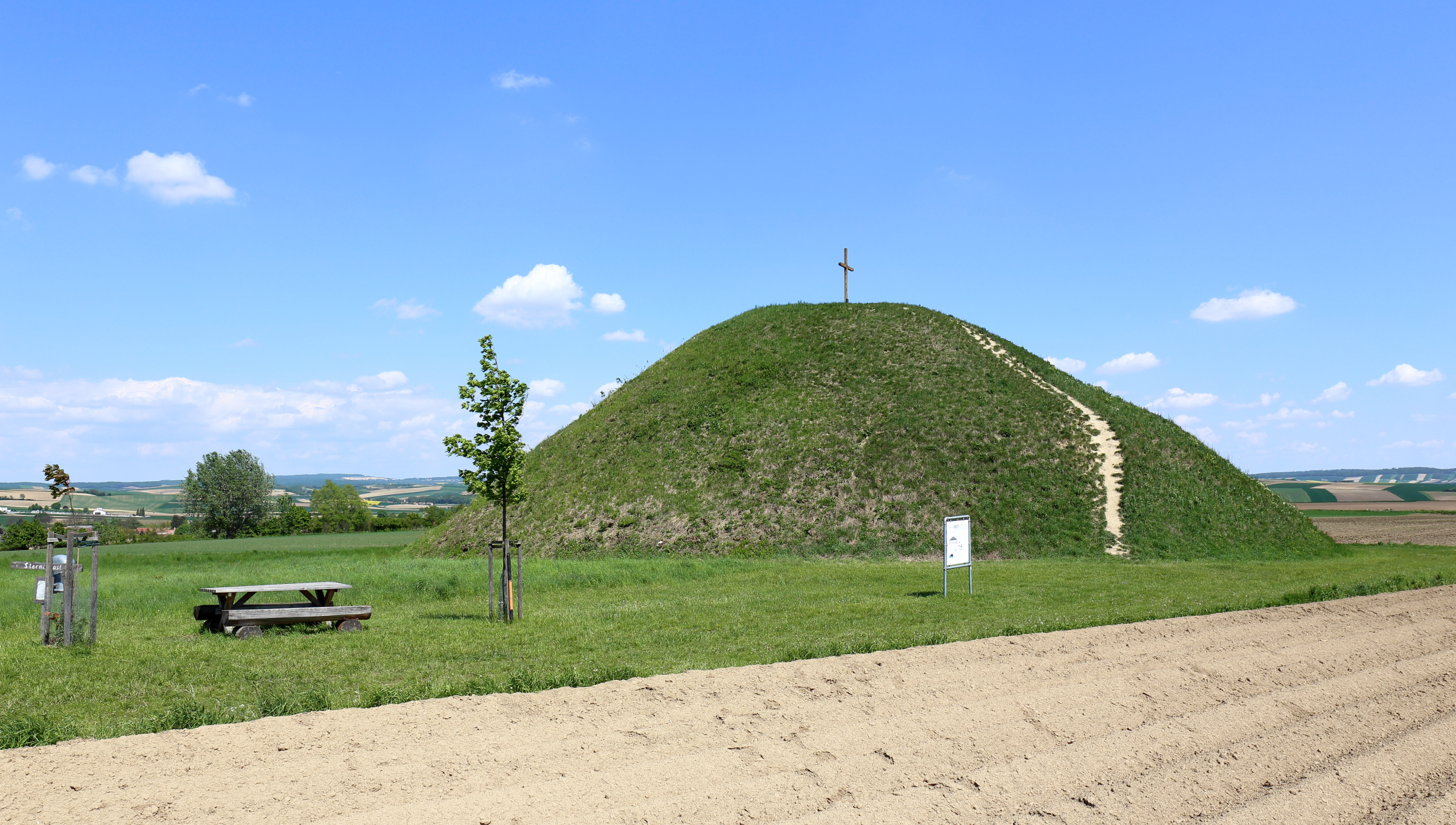
Großmugl in Austria

- Burgstallkogel (Sulm valley)
- Großmugl (Lower Austria)
- Pillichsdorf (Lower Austria)
- Niederhollabrunn (Lower Austria)
- Gaisruck (in Niederösterreich)
- Langenlebarn (in Niederösterreich)
- Deutsch-Altenburg (in Niederösterreich)
- Bernhardsthal (Lower Austria)
- Siegendorf (Burgenland)
- Schandorf (Burgenland)
- Kleinklein (Styria)
- Niederfellabrunn (Lower Austria))
- Oberhofen am Irrsee (Upper Austria)
- Obermallebarn (Lower Austria)
- Unterzögersdorf (Lower Austria)

===== Belgium =====
- Two Tumuli of Ambresin (Liège Province)
- Tumulus of Avernas in Hannut (Liège): height: 8 m; circumference: 100 m
- Tumulus of the "champ de la Tombe" in Braives (Liège), 1st century AD Roman tomb.
- Tumulus of Court-Saint-Étienne (Walloon Brabant), around 3,000 BC.
- Two tumuli of Gingelom
- Three tumuli of Gingelom
- Tumulus of Glimes in Incourt (Walloon Brabant), Gallo-Roman period: height: 11 m; diameter: 50 m
- Tumulus of Hottomont in Ramillies (Walloon Brabant), tomb of: height: 11.5 m; diameter: 50 m
- Tumulus of Oleye (Liek) (Liège)
- Tumulus of Pepin of Landen in Landen (Flemish Brabant)
- Tumuli of the Sonian Forest (Brussels), 1st millennium BC.
- Three Tumuli of Grimde in Tienen (Flemish Brabant), 1st century BC Gallo-Roman tombs.
- Tumulus of Koninksem (Paardsweidestraat, Tongeren)
- Tumulus of Koninksem (Romeinse Kassei, Tongeren)
- Tumulus of Herstappe or Herstappeltombe, Herstappe
- Tumulus of Beukenberg, Tongeren
- Tumulus of Trou de Billemont in Antoing (Hainaut Province), 6th and 7th-century Merovingian tombs.
- Tumulus of Walhain (Walloon Brabant)
- Two Tumuli of Waremme (Liège)
- Tumuli of Wéris (Belgian Luxembourg), 4th and 3rd millennium BC.

===== United Kingdom =====
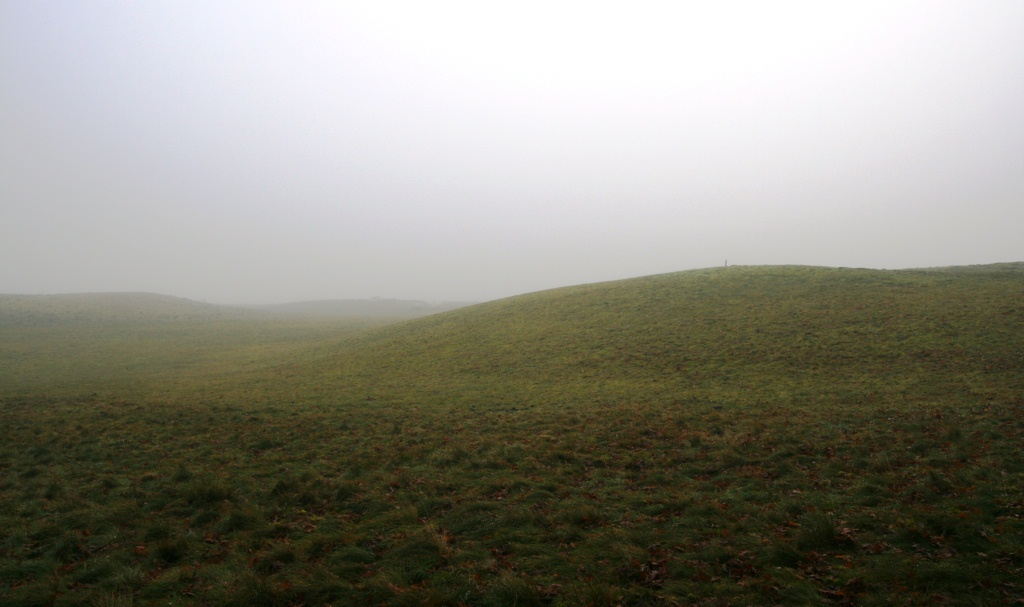
Part of the burial ground at Sutton Hoo, Suffolk

In the United Kingdom, barrows of a wide range of types were in widespread use for burying the dead from the late Neolithic until the end of the Bronze Age, 2900–800 BC. Square barrows were occasionally used in the Iron Age (800 BC–43 AD) in the east of England. The traditional round barrow experienced a brief resurgence following the Anglo-Saxon conquests, with the introduction of northern Germanic burial practices from continental Europe. These later barrows were often built near older Bronze Age barrows. They included a few instances of ship burial. Barrow burial fell out of use during the 7th century as a result of the spread of Christianity. Early scholarly investigation of tumuli and theorising as to their origins was undertaken from the 17th century by antiquaries, notably John Aubrey, and William Stukeley. During the 19th century in England the excavation of tumuli was a popular pastime amongst the educated and wealthy upper classes, who became known as "barrow-diggers". This leisure activity played a key role in laying the foundations for the scientific study of the past in Britain but also resulted in untold damage to the sites.

Notable British barrows include:

- West Kennet Long Barrow – Neolithic long barrow in Wiltshire
- Wayland's Smithy – Neolithic long barrow and chamber tomb in Oxfordshire (historically Berkshire)
- Belas Knap – Neolithic long barrow in Gloucestershire
- Maeshowe – Neolithic chambered cairn and passage grave on Mainland, Orkney
- Duggleby Howe – Neolithic round barrow in the East Riding of Yorkshire
- Sutton Hoo – 7th-century East Anglian ship burial with exceptionally rich grave goods in Suffolk
- Devil's Humps – Bronze Age barrow group on Bow Hill in West Sussex
- Devil's Jumps – Bronze Age barrow group on the South Downs of West Sussex
- Seamer Beacon – Bronze Age barrow near Scarborough, North Yorkshire

===== Czech Republic =====
During the early Middle Ages, Slavic tribesmen inhabiting what is now the Czech Republic used to bury their dead under barrows. This practice has been widespread in southern and eastern Bohemia and some neighbouring regions, like Upper Austria and Lusatia, which at that time have been also populated with Slavic people. There are no known Slavic barrows in the central part of the country (around Prague), nor are they found in Moravia. This has led some of the archaeologists to speculations about at least three distinct waves of Slavic settlers, who colonized Czech lands separately from each other, each wave bringing its customs with it (including burial rituals).

At places where barrows have been constructed, they are usually found in groups (10 to 100 together), often forming several clearly distinct lines going from the west to the east. Only a few of them have been studied scientifically so far; in them, both burials by fire (with burnt ashes) and unburned skeletons have been found, even on the same site. It seems that builders of the barrows have at some time switched from burials by fire to burying of unburned corpses; the reason for such change is unknown. The barrows date too far back in history (700 AD to 800 AD) to contain any Christian influences.

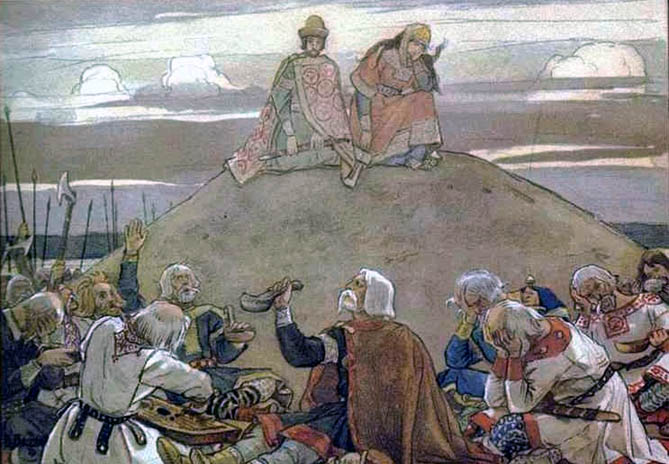
Burial of Oleg of Novgorod in a tumulus in 912. Painting by Viktor Vasnetsov

As Czech barrows usually served for burials of poor villagers, only a few objects are found in them except for cheap pottery. Only one Slavic barrow is known to have contained gold.

Most of the Czech burial barrows have been damaged or destroyed by intense agriculture in the densely populated region. Those that remain are usually in forests, especially at hilltops in remote places. Therefore, there is no general knowledge about burial barrows among Czech population.

The best Slavic barrow sites can be found near to Vitín, a small village close to České Budějovice. There are two groups of barrows close to Vitín, each containing about 80 barrows ordered in lines. Some of the barrows are as much as 2 metres high.

There are also some prehistoric burial barrows in Czech Republic, built by unknown people. Unlike Slavic barrows, they can be found all across the country, though they are scarce. Distinguishing them from Slavic ones is not an easy task for the unskilled eye. Perhaps the most famous of them forms the top of the Žuráň hill near Slavkov u Brna; it is from here that Napoleon commanded his forces during the Battle of Austerlitz.

===== France =====
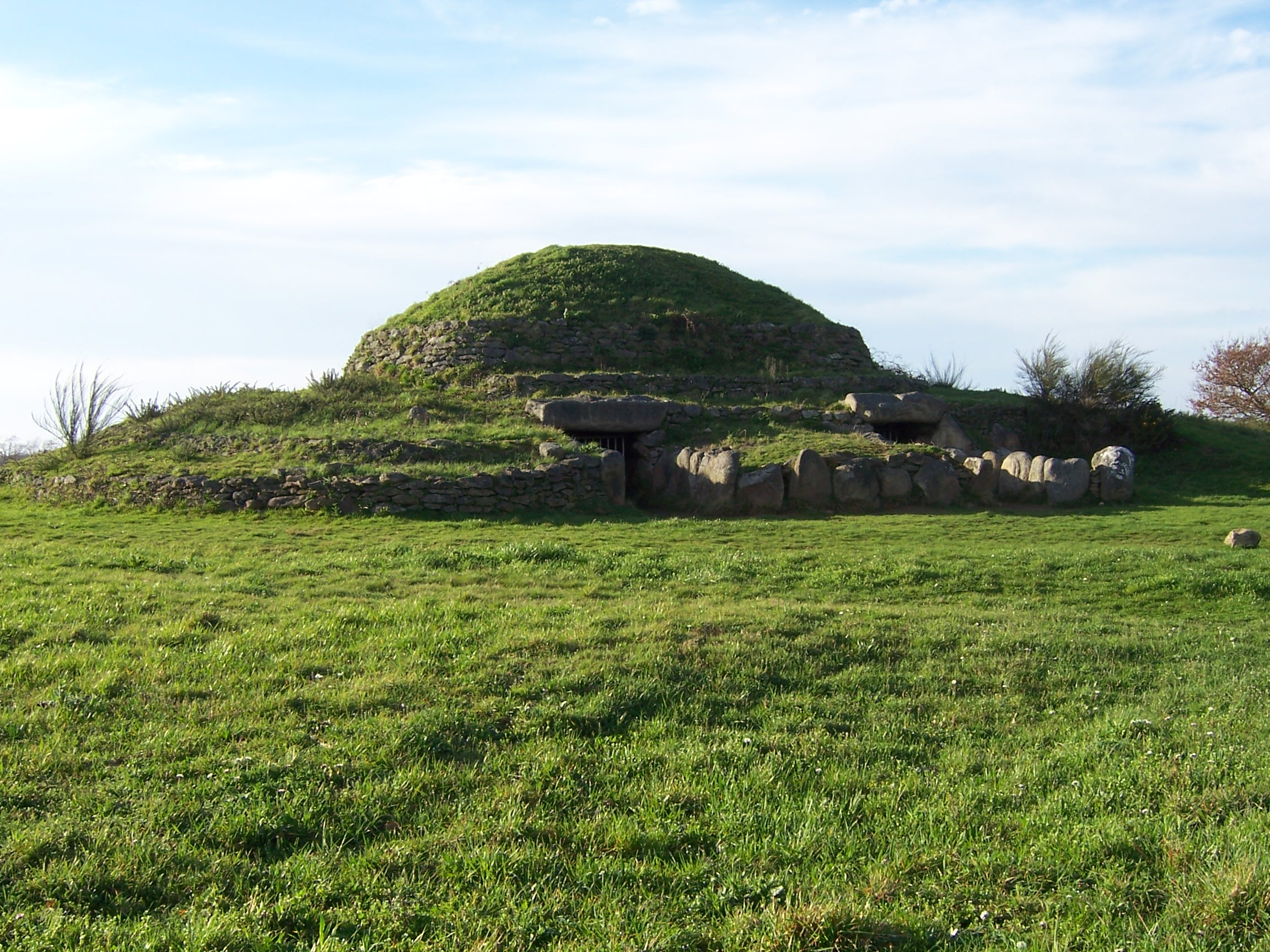
The mound of Dissignac is a megalithic monument located in the French town of Saint-Nazaire.

- Bougon (Deux-Sèvres) tumuli are a set of five tumuli all at one site: the building and using took place over a long period from 4,500 to 3,000 BC. This set is considered to be one of the oldest western European megalithic necropolis.
- The Bussy-le-Château commune (Marne) has five Roman, Visigoth and Burgundian tumuli: three of them remain relatively intact along the Noblette river.
- The neolithic Saint-Michel de Carnac tumulus in Carnac was built between 5,000 and 3,400 BC.
- A few kilometers from Carnac are the 140 by 20 metres (459 ft × 66 ft) neolithic Er-Grah tumuli near the famous broken Menhir.
- The five Tumulus de champ Châlons in the Benon forest form a neolithic necropolis in the Courçon commune (Charente-Maritime).
- Dissignac tumulus is a neolithic monument located about 5 kilometres west of Saint-Nazaire (Loire-Atlantique).
- The tumulus of Lamalou dolmen is situated at the headwaters of the Lamalou river.
- Tumulus and burial chamber (dolmen) of Bergerie de Panissière is located near Alès (Gard).
- Tanouëdou tumulus is located near Bourbriac (Côtes d'Armor, Brittany).
- Péré Tumulus on Prissé-la-Charrière commune (Deux-Sèvres): a neolithic long barrow with tumulus 100 by 20 metres (328 ft × 66 ft), dating from 4,450 to 4,000 BC.
- Saint-Fiacre tumulus, on the Melrand commune (Morbihan), is listed as monument historique since 1972.
- Appenwihr tumuli on the Appenwihr commune (Haut Rhin) are a set of nine small tumuli (about 1.50 metres (4.9 ft) tall and one higher at 4 to 5 metres (13 to 16 ft)), not far to the north-west. The results of the excavations are exposed in the Unterlinden Museum in Colmar.
- Tumulus des Hogues, neolithic monuments located in Habloville.

===== Germany =====
Hügelgrab ("barrow", "burial mound" or "tumulus") sites in Germany dating to the Early and Middle Bronze Age.

Name	Place	Region	Bundesland	Type	Date	Era
Auleben grave-hill field	Auleben	Nordhausen	Thuringia	Grave-hill field	1500–1200 BC	Bronze Age
Benther hill	Badenstedt	Region Hannover	Lower Saxony	Hilly-grave	1800–1100 BC	Early Nordic Bronze Age
Kreuzlinger Forst/Mühltal	Gauting	Munich area	Bavaria	Hilly-grave	2000–1500 BC	Bronze Age
Germans Grave (Itzehoe)	Itzehoe	Kreis Steinburg	Schleswig-Holstein	Hilly-grave	1500–1300 BC	Bronze Age
Giesen Tumuli	Giesen (village)	Landkreis Hildesheim	Lower Saxony	Hilly-grave	1600–1200 BC	Bronze Age
Bonstorf Barrows	Bonstorf	Landkreis Celle	Lower Saxony	grave-hill field	1500–1200 BC	Bronze Age
Lahnberge Tumuli	Marburg	Landkreis Marburg-Biedenkopf	Hesse	>200 Hilly-graves	1600 – 5th century BC	Middle Bronze Age (Tumulus culture), Late Bronze Age (Urnfield culture), Iron Age (Hallstatt Culture)
Wilhof mountain	Willhof	Landkreis Schwandorf	Bavaria	Hilly-grave	1516 BC	Middle Bronze Age, early La Tene culture
Daxberg Tumuli (Mömbris)	Daxberg (Mömbris)	Landkreis Aschaffenburg	Bavaria	Hilly-grave field	2000–800 BC	Iron Age
Hohenfelde	Hohenfelde (Mecklenburg)	Mecklenburgische Seenplatte	Mecklenburg-Vorpommern	7 Hilly-graves	1700 BC	Bronze Age
Neu Quitzenow	Neu Quitzenow	Rostock	Mecklenburg-Vorpommern	2 Hilly-graves	1800–600 BC	
Grabhügel von Leubingen	Leubingen	Sömmerda	Thuringen	grave-hill	1940 BC	Unetice culture

Barrows or tumuli sites in Germany dating to the Late Bronze and Iron Age.

Name	Place	Region	Bundesland	Type	Date	Era
Pöckinger Gemeindegebiet (Pöcking local community area)	Pöcking	Munich area	Bavaria	grave-hill field	c. 750–500 BC	Hallstatt culture
Glauberg	Glauburg	Wetteraukreis	Hesse	Kings graves	5th century BC	Early Celtic Age
Lahnberge	Marburg	Landkreis Marburg-Biedenkopf	Hesse	>200 Hilly graves	c. 1600 – 5th century BC	Middle Bronze Age (Tumulus culture), Late Bronze Age (Urnfield culture), Iron Age (Hallstatt Culture)
Hohmichele	Hundersingen	Landkreis Sigmaringen	Baden-Württemberg	Kings graves	c. 600–450 BC	Hallstatt culture
Grave-hill of Hochdorf	Hochdorf an der Enz	Landkreis Ludwigsburg	Baden-Württemberg	Hilly-grave	5th century BC	Hallstatt culture
Lehbühl	Schlaitdorf	Landkreis Esslingen	Baden-Württemberg	Hill-grave	c. 600–400 BC	Hallstatt culture
Daxberg Tumuli (Mömbris)	Daxberg (Mömbris)	Landkreis Aschaffenburg	Bavaria	Hilly-grave field	c. 2000–800 BC	Iron Age
Daxberg Tumuli (Erkheim)	Daxberg (Erkheim)	Landkreis Unterallgäu	Bavaria	Hilly-grave field	8th century BC	Iron Age
Neu Quitzenow	Neu Quitzenow	Rostock	Mecklenburg-Vorpommern	2 Hilly-graves	c. 1800–600 BC	
Royal grave of Seddin	Seddin	Landkreis Prignitz	Brandenburg	Kings graves	8th century BC	Bronze Age
Pestrup Grave fields	Wildeshausen	Landkreis Oldenburg	Lower Saxony	~ 500 grave-hills	c. 900–200 BC	Bronze Age
Magdalenenberg	Villingen	Schwarzwald-Baar-Kreis	Baden-Württemberg	Kings grave	c. 616 BC	Hallstatt culture
Wagon grave of Bell	Bell (Hunsrück)	Rhein-Hunsrück-Kreis	Rhineland-Palatinate	Wagon-grave	500 BC	Hallstatt culture
Schweinert Tumuli	Falkenberg (in Schweinert Nature reserve)	Landkreis Elbe-Elster	Brandenburg	642-hill-graves field	c. 1000 BC	
Breitenfeld	Neuhausen ob Eck	Landkreis Tuttlingen	Baden-Württemberg	21 grave-hills	c. 700 BC – 450 AD	Hallstatt culture

Barrows or tumuli sites in Germany dating to the Stone Age.

Name	Place	Region	Bundesland	Type	Date	Era
Grave fields of Grabau	Grabau (Stormarn)	Kreis Stormarn	Schleswig-Holstein	9 grave-hills	6500–5500 BC	Young Stone Age
Mansenberge	Groß Berßen	Landkreis Emsland	Lower Saxony	Great stone grave	3600–2800 BC	Megalith Culture

Other Barrows/tumuli in Germany of unstated date.

Name	Place	Region	Bundesland	Type	Date	Era
Beckdorf	Beckdorf	Landkreis Stade	Lower Saxony	Hilly-grave		
Heidelberg	Wiera	Schwalm-Eder-Kreis	Hesse	Hill-grave		Bronze Age
Mellingstedt	Lemsahl-Mellingstedt	Wandsbek	Hamburg	Hilly-grave		Bronze Age
Höltinghausen	Höltinghausen	Landkreis Cloppenburg	Lower Saxony	Hilly-grave field		
Plankenheide	Nettetal	Kreis Viersen	North Rhine-Westphalia	Hill-grave		
Kranzberger Forst	Kranzberg	Landkreis Freising	Bavaria	19 Hilly-graves		Bronze Age
Maaschwitz	Maaschwitz	Muldentalkreis	Saxony	Hilly-graves		
Plaggenschale	Plaggenschale	Landkreis Osnabrück	Lower Saxony			
Tumulus von Nennig	Nennig	Landkreis Merzig-Wadern	Saarland	Grave-hill		Bronze Age
Winckelbarg		Landkreis Stade	Lower Saxony			

===== Ireland =====
A tumulus can be found close to the Grianán of Aileach in County Donegal. It has been suggested by historians such as George Petrie, who surveyed the site in the early 19th century, that the tumulus may predate the ringfort of Aileach by many centuries possibly to the Neolithic age. Surrounding stones were laid horizontally, and converged towards the centre. The mound had been excavated in Petrie's time, but nothing explaining its meaning was discovered. It was subsequently destroyed, but its former position is marked by a heap of broken stones. Similar mounds can be found at The Hill of Tara and there are several prominent tumuli at Brú na Bóinne in County Meath.

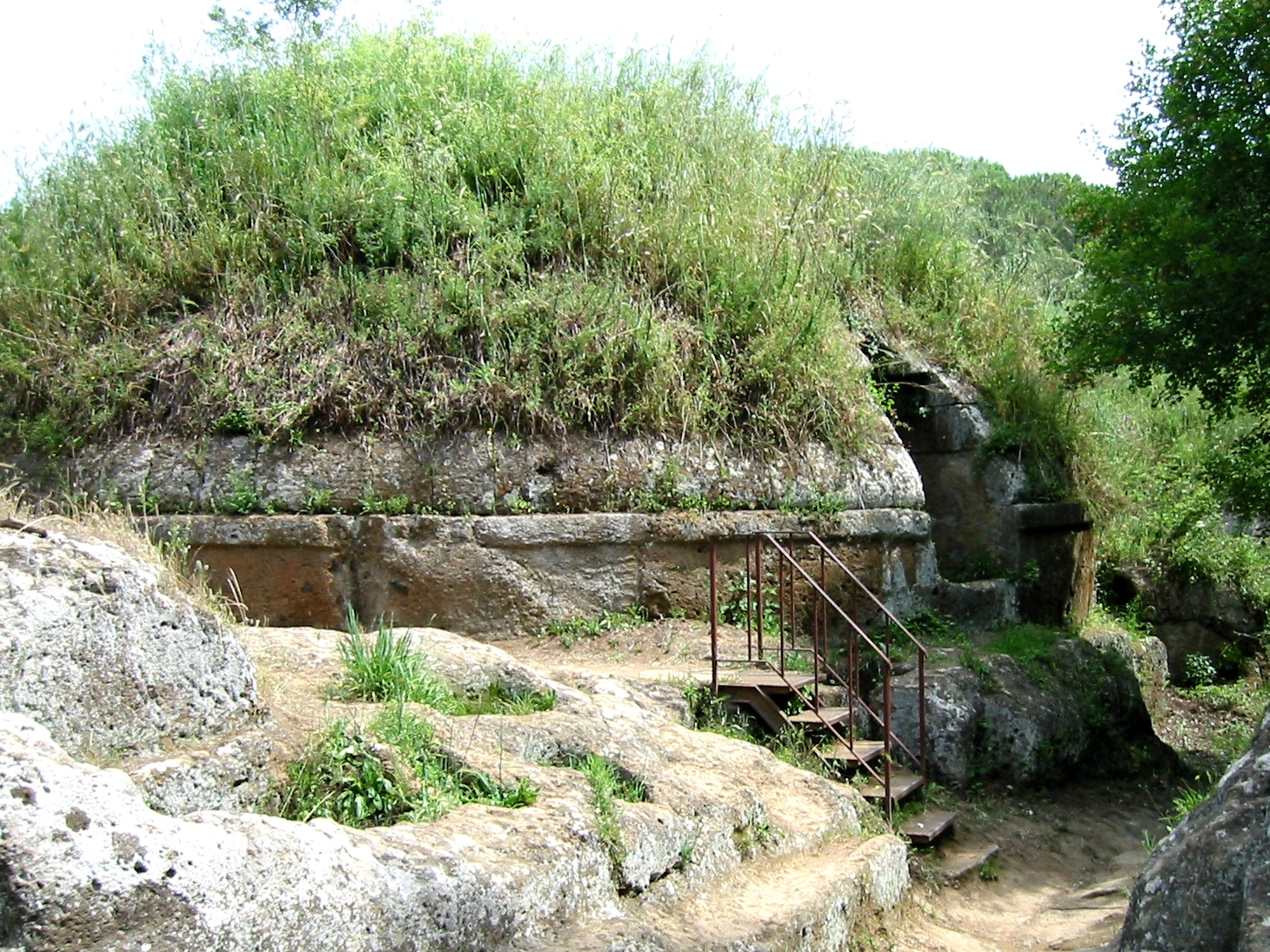
Banditaccia Tumulus in Cerveteri, Italy.

===== Italy =====
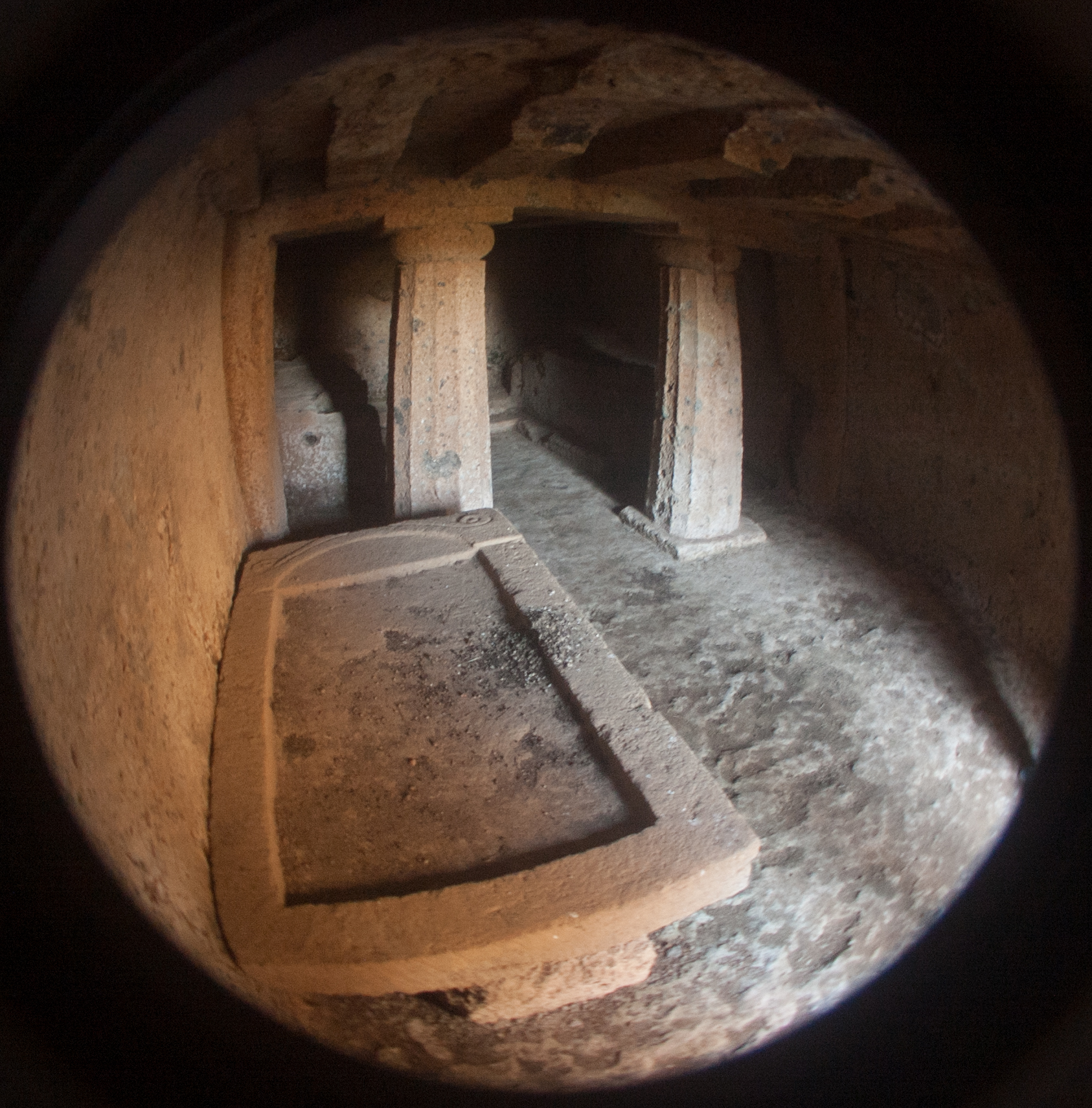
Interior of the Tomba Margareth, Etruscan tumulus near Blera, Italy

Some large tumulus tombs can be found especially in the Etruscan culture, carved directly into the local limestone (tufa), and covered by a limestone dome and a layer of dirt and grass (see image to the right). From the outside, they resemble burial mounds.

The interior of these tumuli, however, is what makes them so unique. Most tombs have one central corridor, where sarcophagi and urns house the cremated remains of the deceased were found, and the various rooms to either side of the corridor which contain the deceased's various belongings.

Many tombs also hold paintings, or frescos, that in many cases represent the funeral, scenes of real life, or the afterlife. The most significant necropolises with tumulus tombs are Veio, Cerveteri, Vetulonia, and Populonia. The tumulus of Montopoli is relative of archaic center Colli della Città along paratiberina way in Tiber Valley.

Smaller barrows are dated to the Villanova period (ninth-eighth centuries BC), but the biggest were used in the following centuries (from the seventh century afterwards) by the Etruscan aristocracy.

Dissemination of tumuli in the Netherlands; in red "regular" tumuli, in blue urn fields

===== Netherlands =====
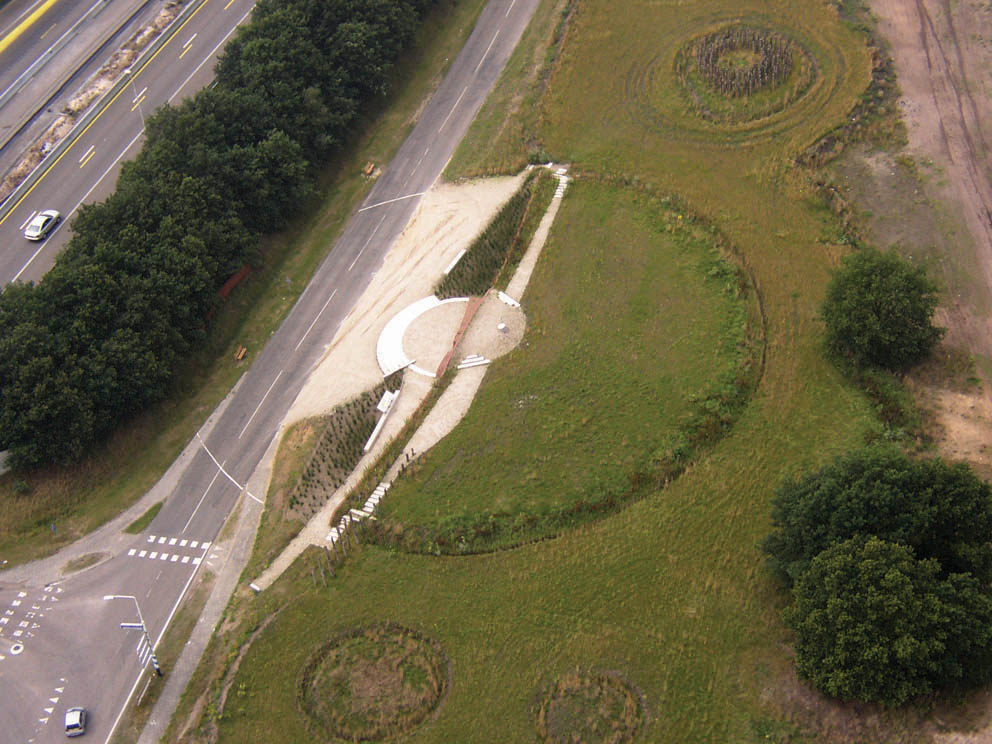
Vorstengraf near Oss (Netherlands) from above

Burial mounds are the most numerous archaeological monuments in the Netherlands. In many places, these prehistoric graves are still clearly visible as low hills. The oldest tumuli (grafheuvels) in the Netherlands were built near Apeldoorn about 5,000 years ago. Concentrations of tumuli from the Bronze Age are located on the Veluwe and Drenthe.

Early scholarly investigation of tumuli and hunebedden and theorising as to their origins was undertaken from the 17th century by notably Johan Picardt. Although many have disappeared over the centuries, some 3000 tumuli are known of which 636 are protected as Rijksmonument. The largest tumulus in the Netherlands is the grave of a king near Oss. Rijksmuseum van Oudheden, Drents Museum, and Huis van Hilde have findings from tumuli in their collections.

===== Portugal =====
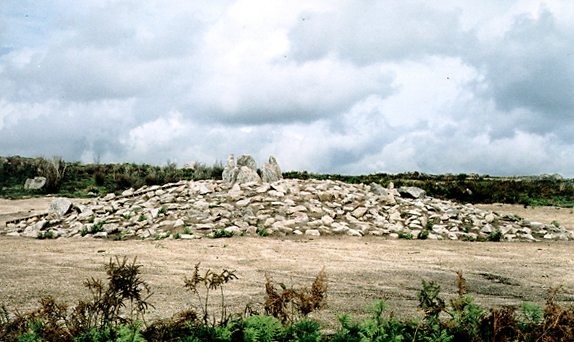
Tumulus at Outeiro de Gregos, Baião, Portugal (5th or 4th millennium BC)

One of the densest manifestations of the megalithic phenomenon in Europe occurred in Portugal. In the north of the country there are more than 1000 late prehistoric barrows. They generally occur in clusters, forming a necropolis. The method of inhumation usually involves a dolmen. The tumuli, dated from c. 4450 to 1900 BC, are up to 3 metres high, with diameters from 6 to 30 metres. Most of them are mounds of earth and stones, but the more recent ones are composed largely or entirely of stones (cairns). In Portuguese, barrows are called mamoas, from the Latin mammulas, given to them by the Romans because of their shape, similar to the breast of a woman.

==== Scandinavia ====
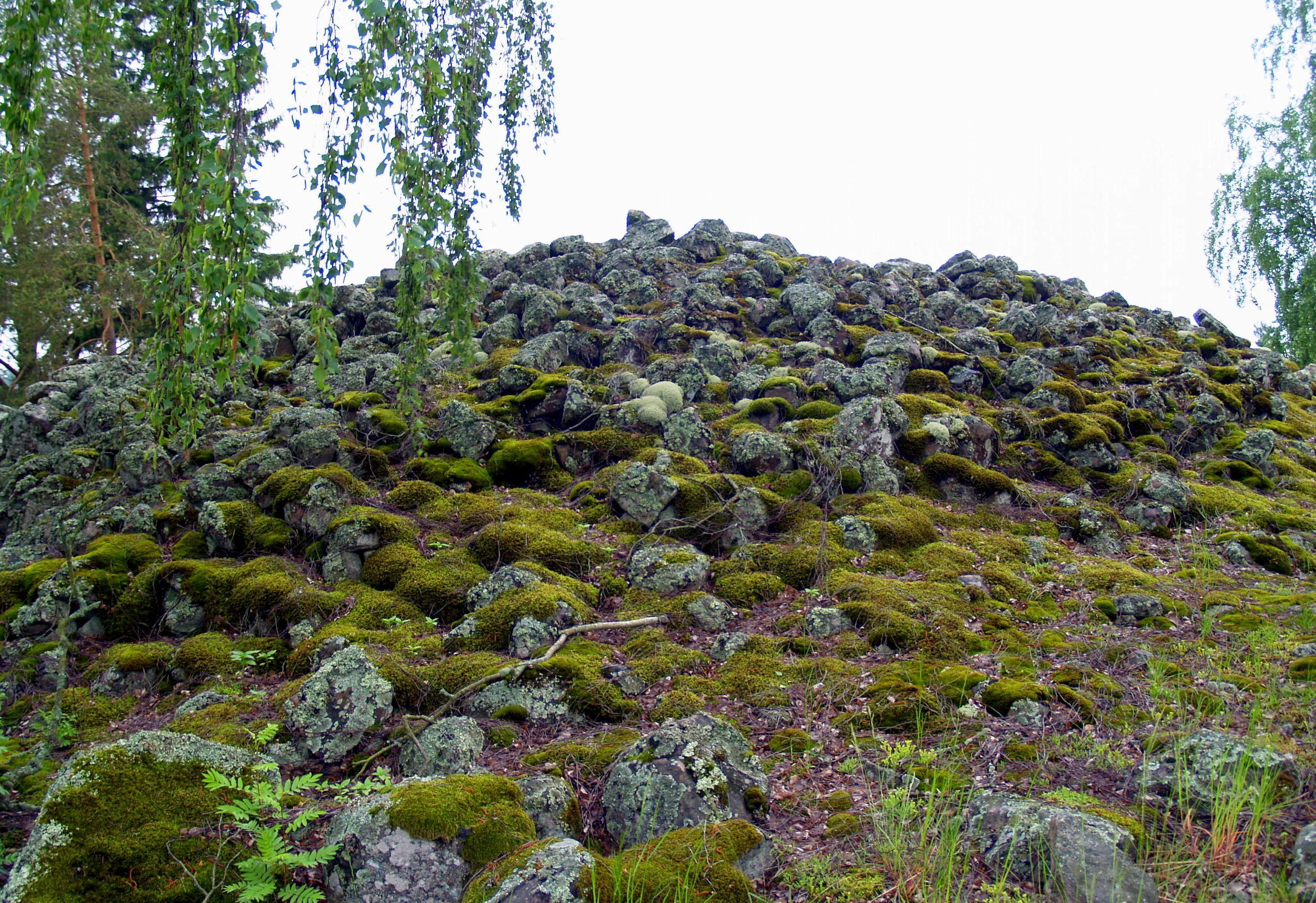
Kuninkaanhauta in Panelia, Finland

Burial mounds were in use from the Stone Age until the 11th century in Scandinavia and figure heavily in Norse paganism. In their original state they usually appear as small, man-made hillocks, though many examples have been damaged by ploughing or plundering so that little visible evidence remains.

The tumuli of Scandinavia is of a great variety of designs, depending on the cultural traditions of the era in which they were constructed. The tumuli tombs may contain single graves, collective graves and both inhumation and cremation was practiced, again depending on the era, but also on geography. Many tumuli in Scandinavia shows a continuation of use from Stone Age to Viking Age. In the Viking Age (and perhaps in earlier times as well) burning the deceased, was believed to transfer the person to Valhalla by the consuming force of fire. Archaeological finds testifies that the cremation fire could reach temperatures of up to 1500 °C. The remains were often covered with cobblestones and then a layer of gravel and sand and finally a thin layer of turf or placed in urns. The tumuli were used for ancestral worshipping, an important practice in Norse culture and many places shows continuation of use for millennia.

Thus he (Odin) established by law that all dead men should be burned, and their belongings laid with them on the pile, and the ashes be cast into the sea or buried in the earth. Thus, said he, every one will come to Valhalla with the riches he had with him upon the pile, and he would also enjoy whatever he himself buried in the earth. For men of consequence a mound should be raised to their memory, and for all other warriors distinguished for manhood, a standing stone. This custom remained long after Odin's time. [...] It was their faith that the higher the smoke arose in the air, the higher he would be raised whose pile it was, and the richer he would be, the more property that was consumed with him.

— Ynglinga saga

===== Sweden =====
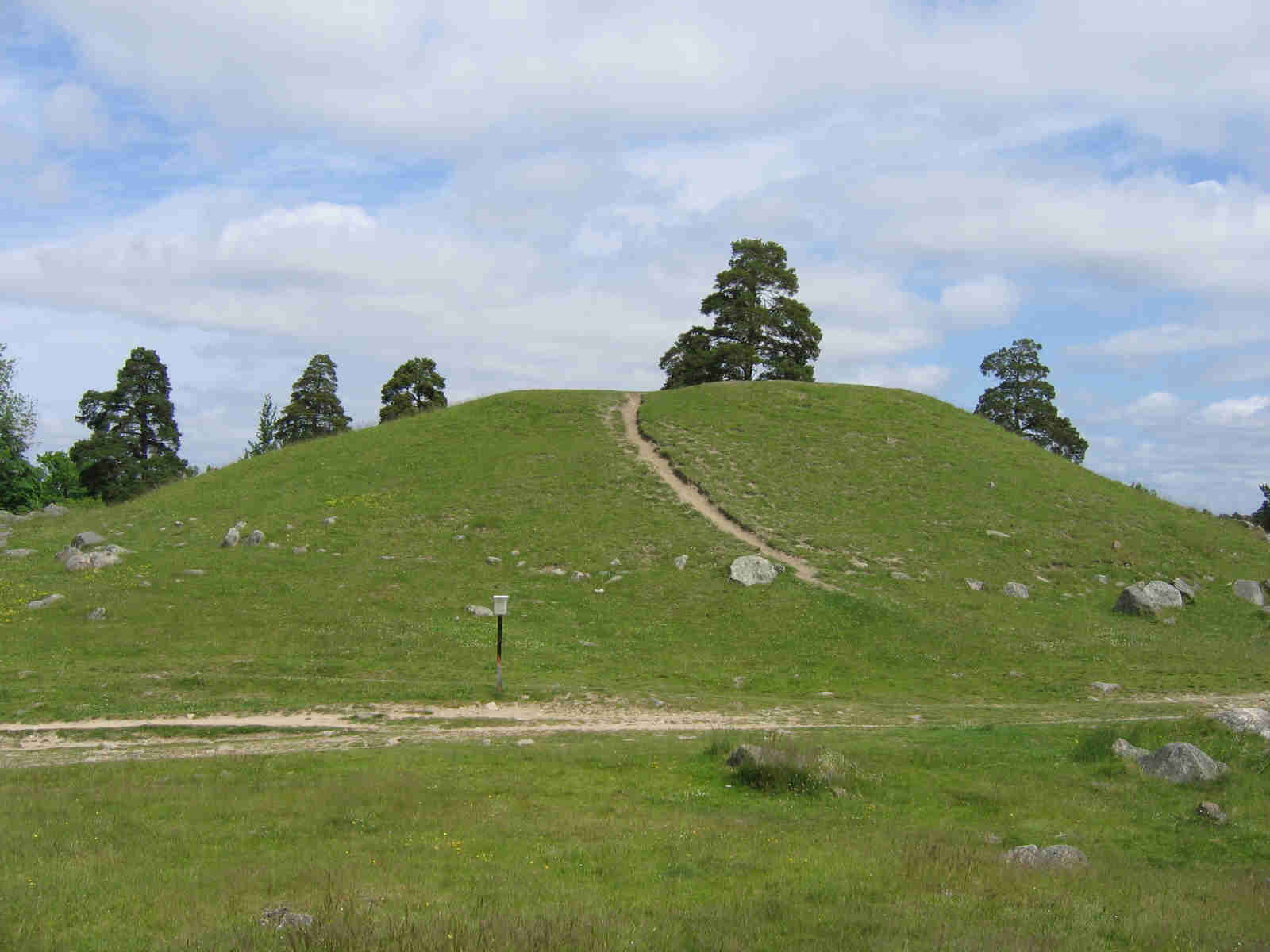
King Björn's barrow in Håga, Sweden

- Anundshög, located just outside the City of Västerås, is Sweden's largest burial mound.
- Gamla Uppsala, The Royal mounds (Swedish: Kungshögarna) is the name for the three large barrows which are located in Gamla Uppsala. According to ancient mythology and folklore, it would be the three gods Thor, Odin and Freyr lying in Kungshögarna or Uppsala högar.
- Gravhög Gårdstånga, situated in Eslöv Municipality, Skåne County, is the site of a Bronze Age burial mound, (Swedish: Gravhög).
- Hågahögen, King Björn's barrow in Håga (Old Norse word: haugr) near Uppsala has a very strong connection with Björn at Haugi.
- Kungshögar, an archaeological site on the Lake Mälaren island of Adelsö in Ekerö Municipality, contains five large burial mounds.
- Skalunda hög in Västergötland, the site of Skalunda Barrow, an historic burial mound.

===== Norway =====
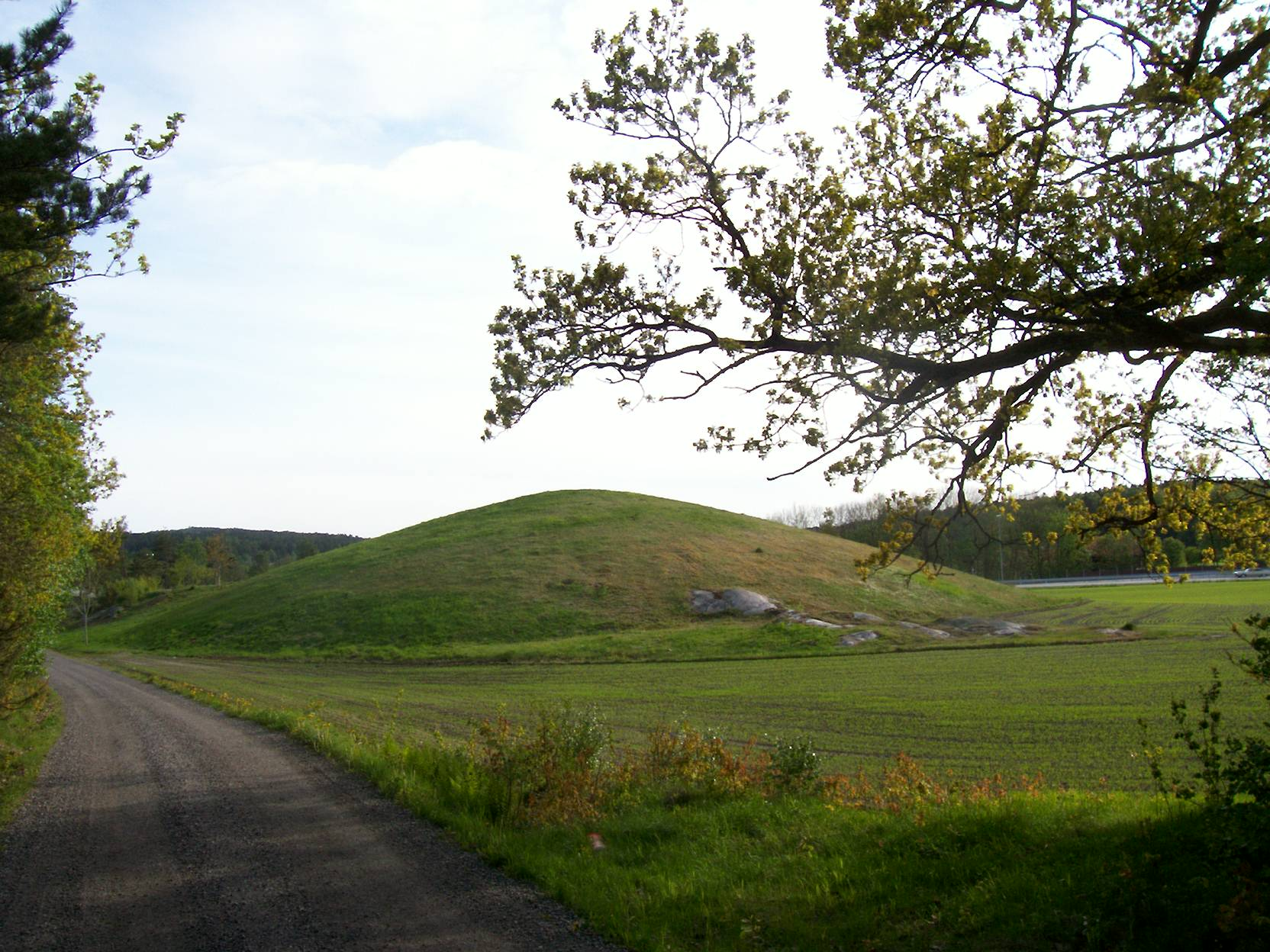
Jellhaugen, Norway's 2nd biggest tumulus Credit: Tore Schrøder

- Raknehaugen (in Romerike), dated to c. 550 AD, is the largest tumulus in Northern Europe, measuring at 77 metres (253 ft) in diameter and a height of 15 metres (49 ft).
- Jellhaugen (in Halden Municipality, Østfold county), considered the 2nd biggest in Norway, and dated back to around 500 AD.
- Gokstadhaugen (in Sandefjord Municipality, Vestfold county), a burial mound with a ship burial containing the Gokstad ship, a Viking era ship dating to the 9th century. The ship is the largest in the Viking Ship Museum in Bygdøy, Oslo.
- Oseberghaugen, the Oseberg burial mound at Oseberg near Tønsberg in Vestfold county, contained the Oseberg ship, a well-preserved Viking era ship dating from around 800 AD.
- Borrehaugene (Borre mound cemetery) forms part of the Borre National Park in Horten Municipality, Vestfold county. The park covers 45 acres (180,000 m^{2}) and its collection of burial mounds includes, seven large mounds and one 25 small cairns.
- Båthaugen (in Sarpsborg Municipality, Østfold county), a boat burial mound found at Rolvsøy which contained the Tune ship, a Viking Age ship of the "karv" type. The ship was built around AD 900 and is made of clinkered oak planks.
- Storhaug (Great Mound) ship's burial mound Avaldsnes in Karmøy Municipality in Rogaland County, which contained a ship made of oak.
- Grønhaug (Green Mound), a ship burial at Avaldsnes, contained an approximately 15-metre (49-foot) long boat with remains of a man's grave from the 10th century.
- Flagghaugen (Flag Hill Mound) at Avaldsnes, one of Norway's richest grave dating from the pre-Viking Period, contained a neck ring of 600 grams (21 ounces)t) of pure gold, weapons, bandoleer mountings and various tubs of silver and bronze.
- Karnilshaugen, in Gloppen Municipality in Vestland county, is Karnil's tumulus.
- Osneshaugen (in Ulsteinvik in Møre og Romsdal county), a tumulus overlooking the Osnes beach. It is believed to have been sacked, and has not been excavated in modern times. It has been dated to the Bronze Age.

===== Denmark =====
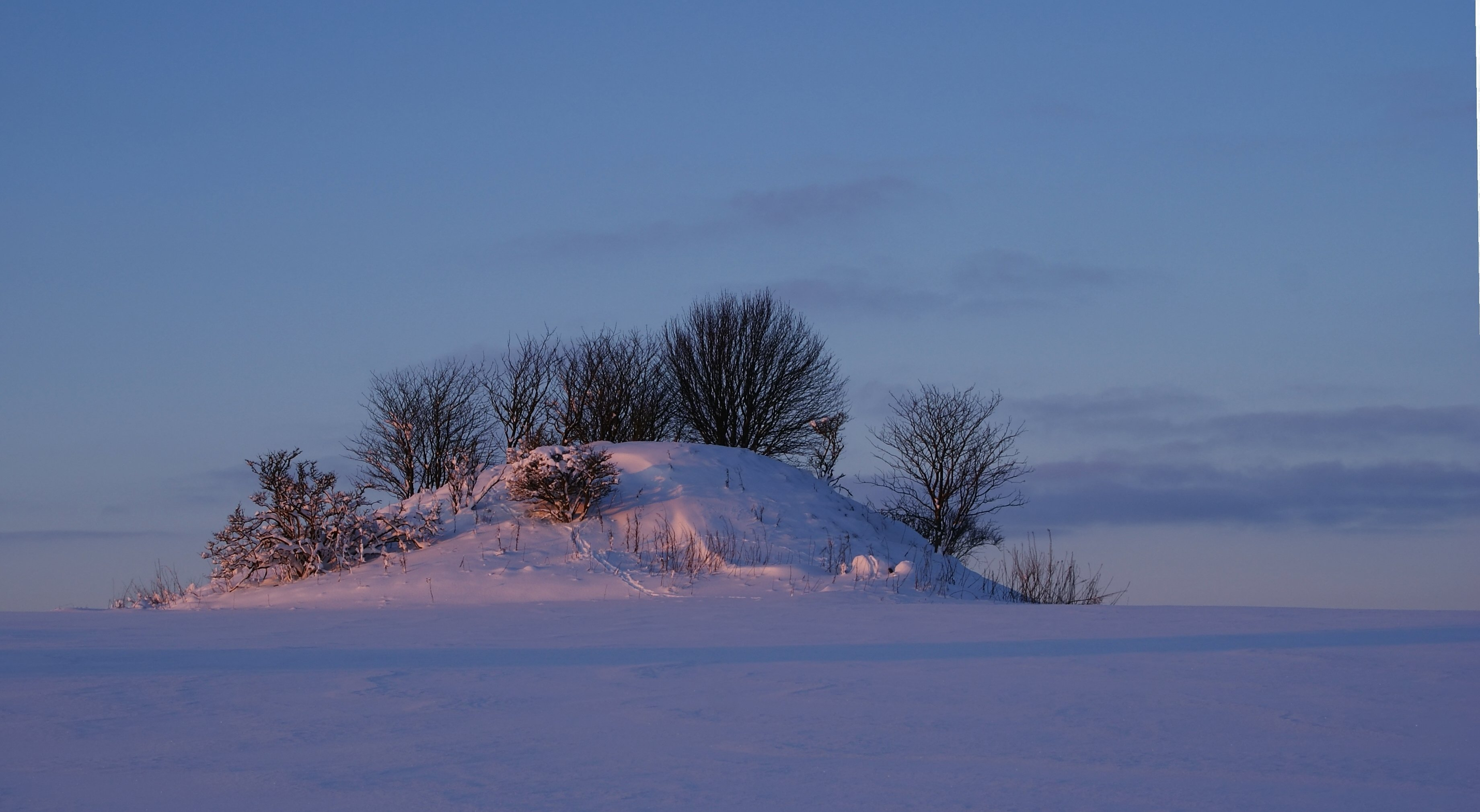
The tumulus Tinghøjen located between Randers and Viborg, one of about 26,000 conserved tumuli in Denmark. Photo from January 2010 AD

Denmark has about 20,000 preserved tumuli, with the oldest being around 5,000 years old. A great number of tumuli in Denmark has been destroyed in the course of history, ploughed down for agricultural fields or used for road or dyke constructions. Tumuli have been protected by law since 1937 and is officially supervised by the Danish Agency for Culture. Examples of tumuli in Denmark are:

- Yding Skovhøj in Horsens Municipality, Jutland is one of Denmark's Bronze Age burial mounds built on the top of the hill.
- Hov Dås in Thisted Municipality, North Jutland is one of Denmark's neolithic burial mounds built on the top of the hill.
- Klekkende Høj is a megalithic passage grave constructed in the Stone Age on the island of Møn. It takes its name from the nearby village of Klekkende.
- Lindholm Høje is a major Viking and Iron Age burial site and former settlement, situated to the north of and overlooking the city of Aalborg.
- Grønjægers Høj, meaning "the mound of Green Hunter", dates to the Nordic Bronze Age and is located near Fanefjord Church on the Danish island of Møn.
- Gorm and Thyra's Høje, two huge burial mounds at Jelling.

=== North America ===
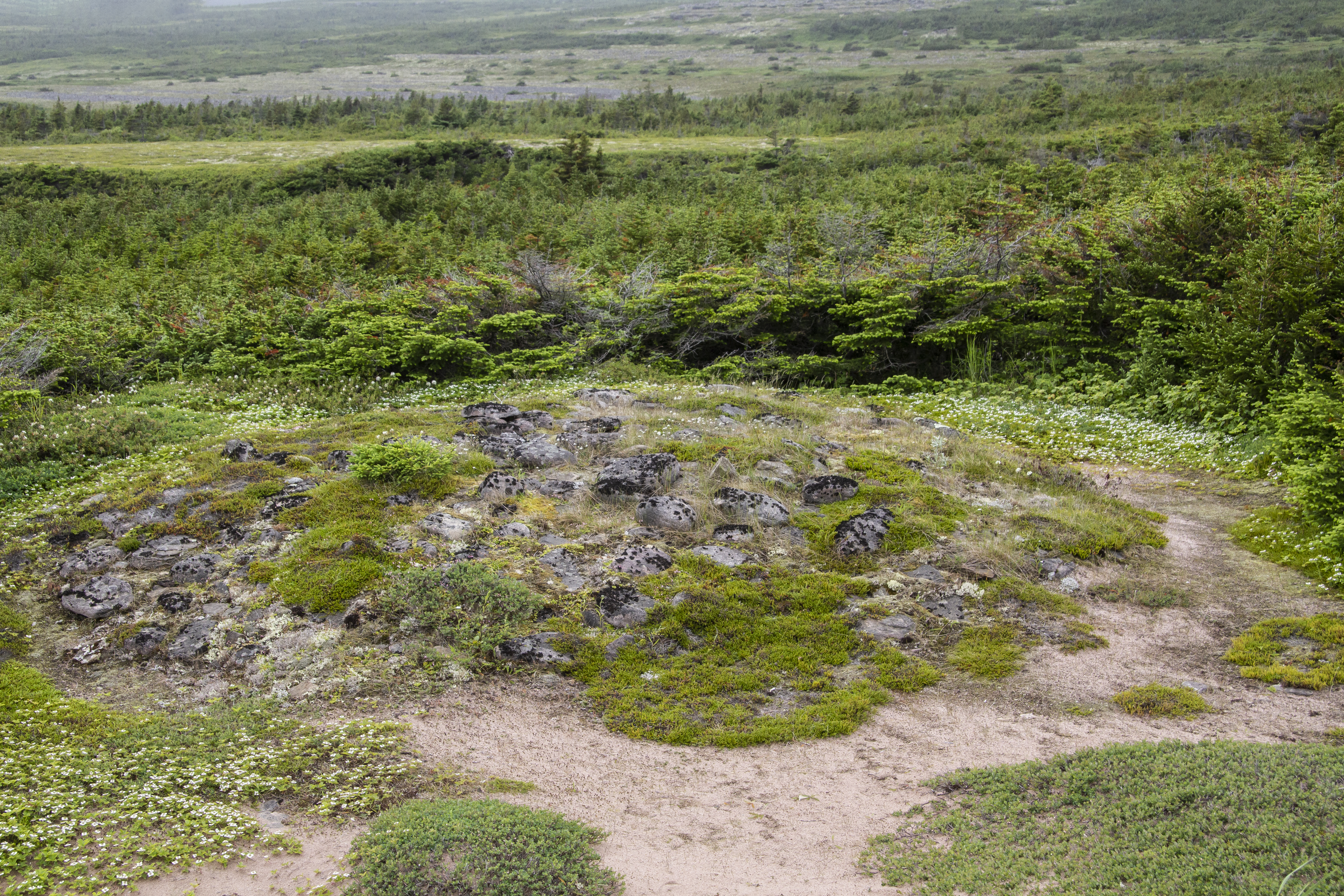
The burial mound at L'Anse Amour, Newfoundland and Labrador, Canada

==== Canada ====
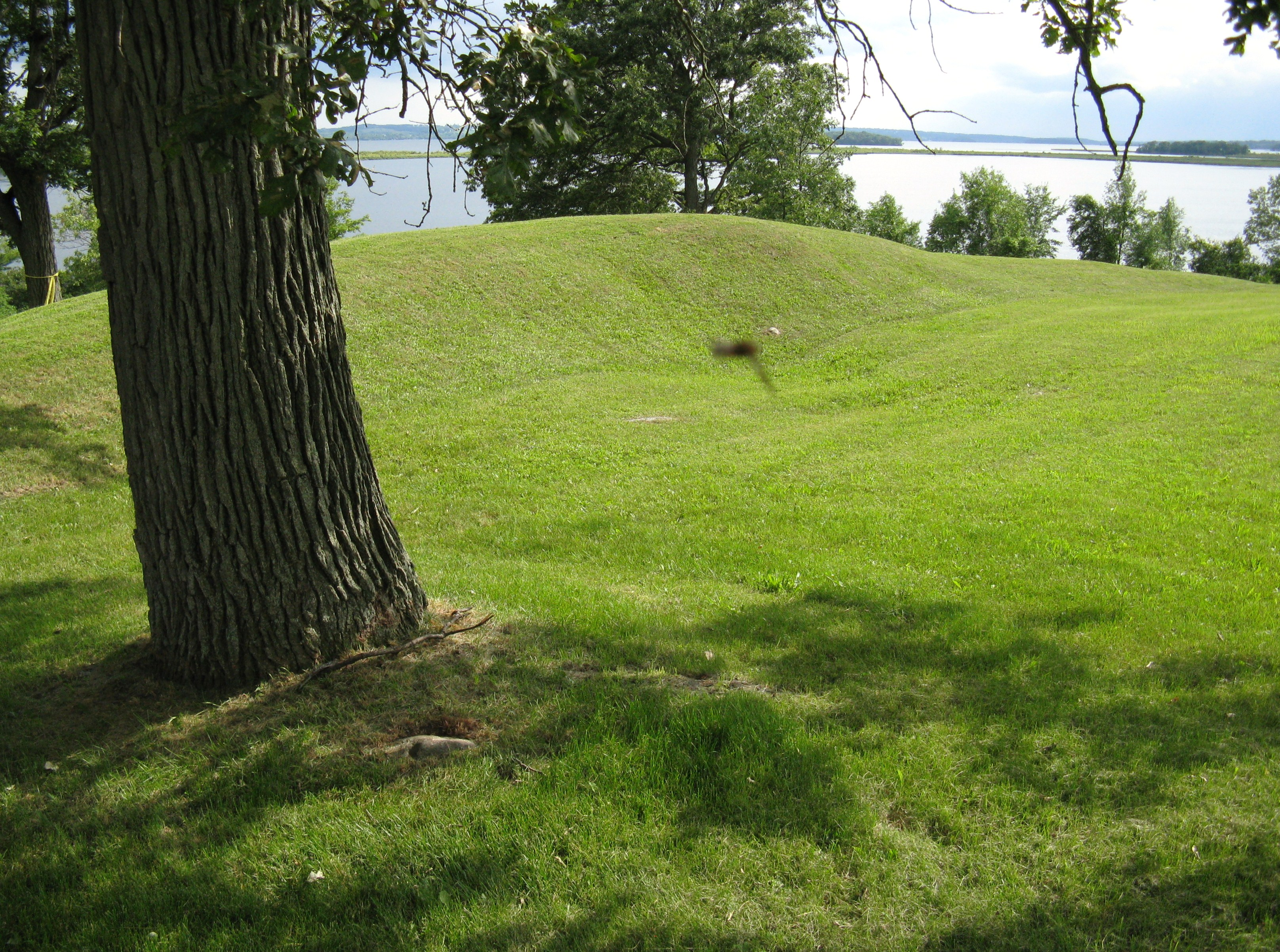
Serpent Mounds Park, located near Peterborough, Ontario, was named because of the zig-zag serpent shapes of its mounds.

L'Anse Amour is an archaeological site located in the Strait of Belle Isle in Newfoundland and Labrador, Canada. This site consists of a single burial mound that is 8 meters in diameter. The remains of a juvenile were found at the site along with a variety of artifacts, including tools and points made from stone and animal bones, a bone whistle, and red ochre colored stones. The juvenile is oriented with their head facing north and their body fully extended. This site has been dated to 8,300 years ago.

This site has been pointed to as an early example of the burial traditions characteristic of the Maritime Archaic Community. Similar sites are located throughout this region, although this tradition seems to have reached its peak around 1,000 years after the construction of the site at L'Anse Amour. Many of these Maritime Archaic burial sites are removed from areas of habitation and may have acted as meeting places for people from across wide areas. The Innu people, who inhabit this area today, were sometimes fearful that the souls of the dead could do harm to the living and therefore buried them in isolated areas under stones. While archaeologists are unsure of the intentions behind the location and construction of this site, these more recent beliefs may suggest that the juvenile at L'Anse Amour may have been buried in this way to protect the living.

The Augustine Mound is an important Mi'kmaq burial site in New Brunswick.

Taber Hill is a Haudenosaunee burial mound in Toronto, Ontario.

In the southern regions of Manitoba and Saskatchewan, evidence of ancient mound builders was discovered by archaeologists, beginning with excavations by Henry Youle Hind in 1857.

In Southwestern British Columbia, several types of burial mounds are known from the Salishan region (Hill-Tout 1895).

==== United States ====
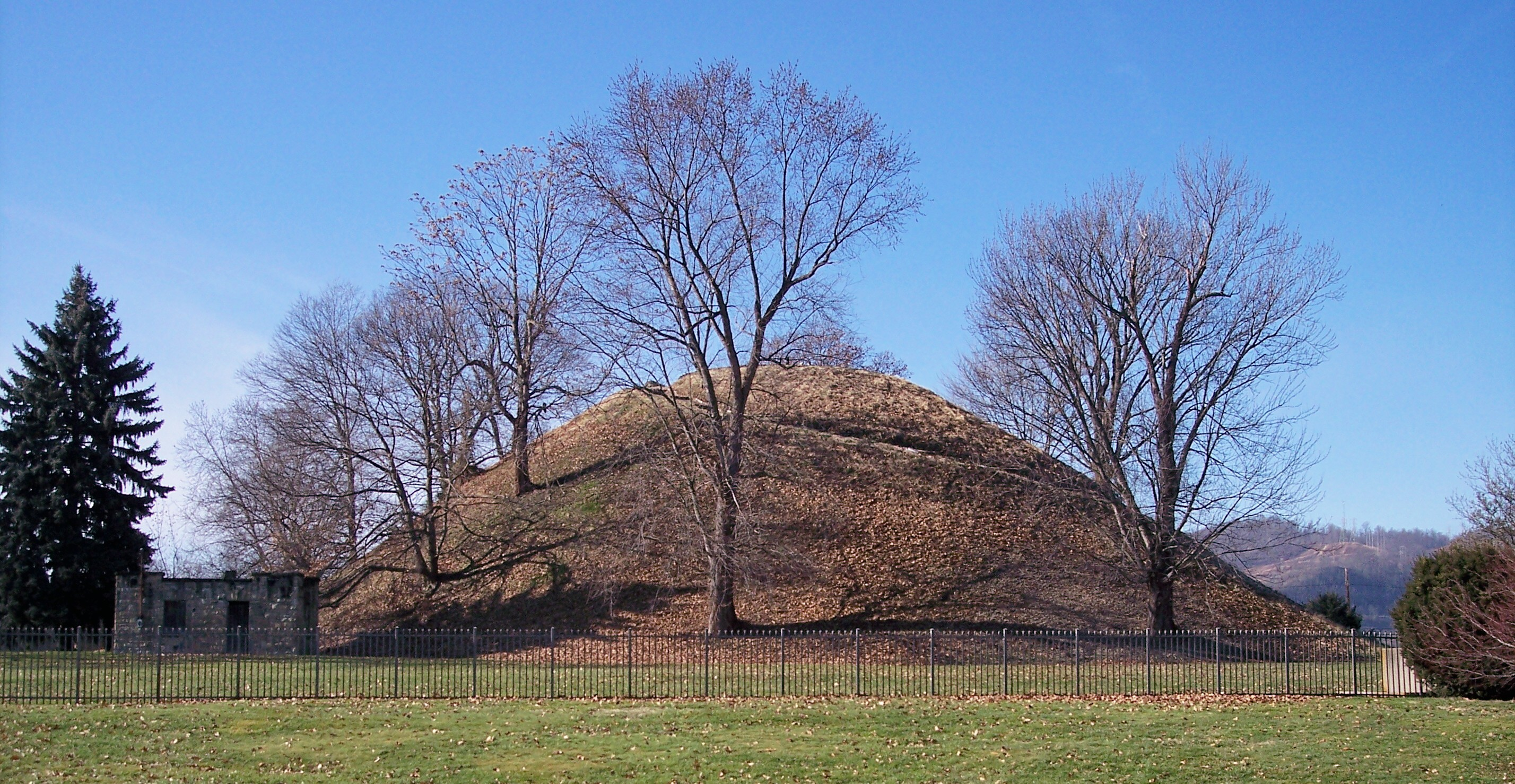
Grave Creek Mound, located in Moundsville, West Virginia, was built by the Adena culture.

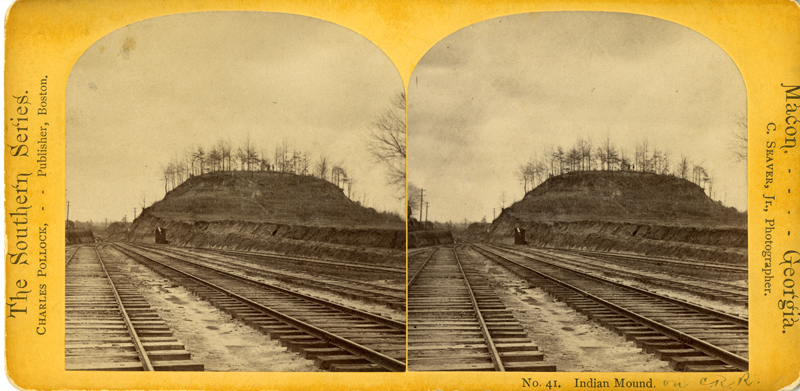
Ocmulgee National Monument Funeral Mound, circa 1876

Mound building was a central feature of the public architecture of many Native American and Mesoamerican cultures from Chile to Minnesota. Thousands of mounds in the United States have been destroyed as a result of farming, pot-hunting, amateur and professional archaeology, road-building and construction. Surviving mounds are still found in river valleys, especially along the Mississippi, Tennessee and Ohio Rivers, and as far west as Spiro Mounds in Oklahoma.

Mounds were used for burial, to support residential and religious structures, to represent a shared cosmology, and to unite and demarcate community. Common forms include conical mounds, ridge-top mounds, platform mounds, and animal effigy mounds, but there are many variations. Mound building in the US is believed to date back to at least 3400 BC in the Southeast (see Watson Brake). The Adena and the Mississippian cultures are principally known for their mounds, as is the Hopewell tradition. The largest mound site north of Mexico is Cahokia Mounds, a vast World Heritage Site located just east of St. Louis, Missouri.

=== South America ===
==== Uruguay ====
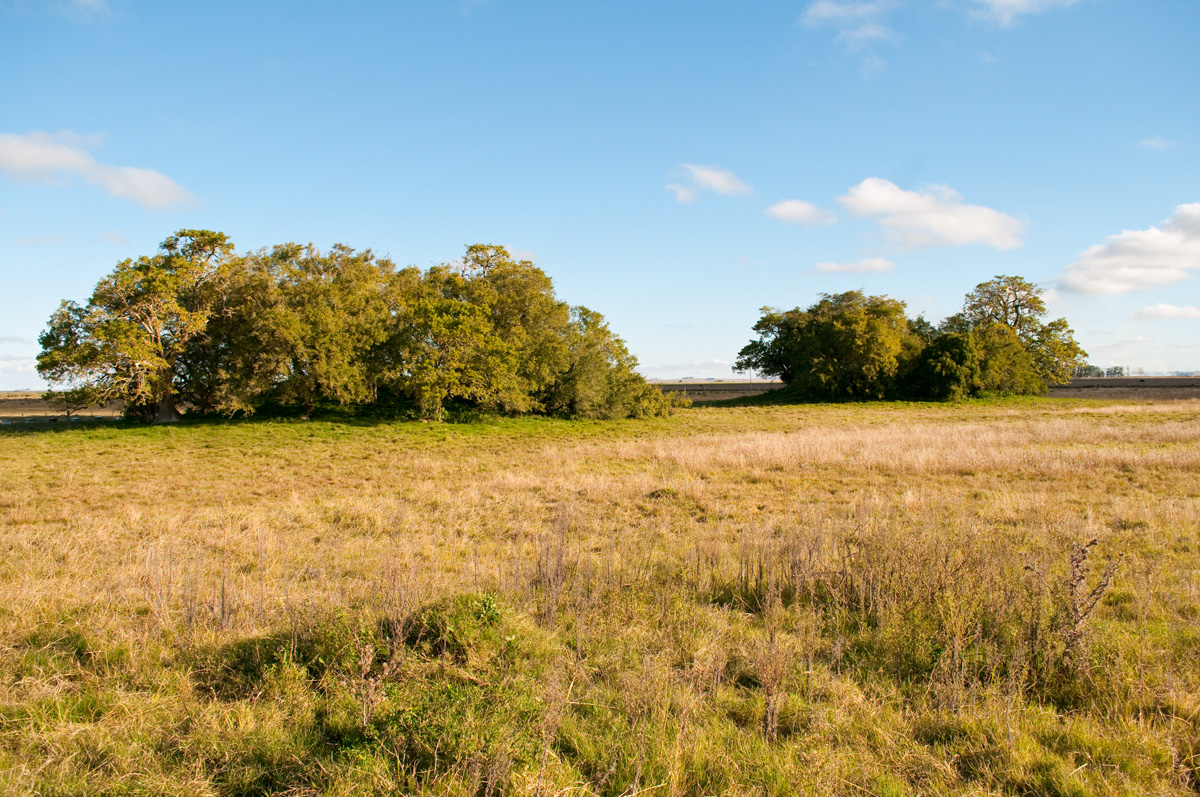
Cerritos in Rocha, Uruguay

The Cerritos de Indios (Spanish for: Indian Mounds or Indian Little Hills) are a collection of more than 3000 tumulus or earth mounds found mainly in the eastern region of Uruguay.

Of different sizes and shapes, some of them date back 4000–5000 years, being among the oldest examples of tumulus building in the new world. The identity of the people group responsible for their construction is unknown, as they left no written records.

It is believed that mounds were used for burial, as well for living and practicing agriculture in the flat marshlands and plains of eastern Uruguay.

== See also ==
- King asleep in mountain
- Barrow-downs, in J.R.R. Tolkien's Middle-earth
- Muranë

== Sources ==
- Albright, William F. (1923). "Interesting finds in tumuli near Jerusalem". Bulletin of the American Schools of Oriental Research. 10 (April). The American Schools of Oriental Research: 1–3. doi:10.2307/1354763. JSTOR 1354763. S2CID 163409706.
- Amiran, Ruth (1958). "The tumuli west of Jerusalem, Survey and Excavations, 1953". Israel Exploration Journal. 8 (4): 205–227.
- Barkay, Gabriel (2003). "Mounds of mystery: where the kings of Judah were lamented". Biblical Archaeology Review. 29 (3): 32–39, 66, 68.
- Grena, G. M. (2004). LMLK – A Mystery Belonging to the King vol. 1. Redondo Beach, California: 4000 Years of Writing History. ISBN 0-9748786-0-X.
- Grinsell, L.V., 1936, The Ancient Burial-mounds of England. London: Methuen.
- Nelson, Sarah Milledge (1993). The Archaeology of Korea. New York: Cambridge University Press. ISBN 0-521-40783-4.
