= List of radio stations in Hungary =

Hungary uses the FM band for commercial and public broadcasting, plus the AM band for the main state radio station and state-run ethnic programs. There are three types of licences defined in the media law: public service, commercial and community, although they do not necessarily correspond to the everyday meanings of these terms.

Types of radio stations defined by the Hungarian media authority are as follows: public service, national commercial, regional, local, small community.

Internet-only stations are not included in this list (except the state-run parliamentary channel).

== Active radio stations ==
Data in this page are from the National Authority database cited above.

Station Name	Seat	Frequency	Owner	Network	Licence	Type (actual)	Format							
Retro Rádió	Budapest	FM network	Hold Rádiós és Televíziós Reklám Kft.	Yes	National commercial	Thematic Commercial	Oldie-based AC (70s-2000s)							
Inforádió	Budapest	Budapest 88,1	Inforádió Kft.		Community	Thematic Commercial	All-news							
Klubrádió	Budapest	Budapest 92,9	Klubrádió Zrt.		Community	Thematic Commercial	Left-wing Talk							
Karc FM	Budapest	Budapest 105,9 MHz; Székesfehérvár 106,6 MHz; Tatabánya 107,0 MHz; Dunaújváros 99,1 MHz; Balatonfüred 96,2 MHz; Győr 88,1 MHz; Kaposvár 97,5 MHz	Karc FM Média Kft.		Community	Thematic Commercial	Right-wing talk							
Tilos Rádió	Budapest	Budapest 90,3	Tilos Kulturális Alapítvány		Community	Community	Freeform variety							
Trend FM	Budapest	Budapest 94,2	Műsor-Hang Zrt.		Community	Thematic Commercial	Economy news							
Sláger FM	Budapest	Budapest 95,8	Favorit Masters Kft.		Commercial	Thematic Commercial	Modern AC							
Klasszik Rádió	Budapest	Budapest 92,1	Aerial Rádió Műsorszóró Kft.		Community	Thematic Commercial	Classical							
Mária Rádió	Budapest	Budapest 88,8 MHz; Göd 97,3 MHz; Törökbálint 97,6 MHz	FM 4 Rádió Szolgáltató Kft.	Mária Rádió	Community	Religious	Catholic prayers and talk							
96.4 Rádió 1	Budapest	Budapest 96,4 MHz	Radio Plus Kft.	Rádió 1	Commercial	Network Commercial	CHR							
Manna FM	Budapest	Budapest 98,6	Manna Vision Media Kft.		Community	AC								
90,9 JAZZY RÁDIÓ	Budapest	Budapest 90,9	MAGYAR JAZZ RÁDIÓ Kft.		Community	Thematic Commercial	jazz							
BEST FM	Budapest	Budapest 99,5	Best Radio Kft.	Best FM	Commercial	Commercial	AC (90s-00s)							
Szent István Rádió	Eger	Eger 91,8 MHz; Miskolc 95,1 MHz; Gyöngyös 102,2 MHz; Hatvan 94,0 MHz; Encs 95,4 MHz; Sátoraljaújhely 90,6 MHz	Magyar Katolikus Rádió Alapítvány		Community	Religious	Catholic full service							
Rádió M	Miskolc	Miskolc 101,6 MHz; Kazincbarcika 95,9 MHz; Ózd 99,5 MHz; Tiszaújváros 89,6 MHz	Média Centrum Kft.		Commercial	Local commercial	Hot AC							
96,3 Rádió 1	Miskolc	Miskolc 96,3	M-Lite Kft.	Rádió 1	Commercial	Network Commercial	CHR							
Csillagpont Rádió	Miskolc	Miskolc 103,0	Csillagpont Rádió Alapítvány		Community	Local community	Mix							
Európa Rádió 94,4	Miskolc	Miskolc 94,4	"EURÓPA RÁDIÓ" Nonprofit Közhasznú Kft.	Európa Rádió	Community	Religious	Calvinist talk							
Európa Rádió 100,5	Nyíregyháza	Nyíregyháza 100,5	"EURÓPA RÁDIÓ" Nonprofit Közhasznú Kft.	Európa Rádió	Community	Religious	Calvinist talk							
101,7 Best FM	Pécs	Pécs 101,7	P1 Rádió Kft.	Best FM	Commercial	Local Commercual	Hot AC							
Karc FM 94,6	Pécs	Pécs 94,6	Karc FM Média Kft.	Karc FM	Community	Thematic Commercial	Right-wing talk							
Magyar Katolikus Rádió	Budapest	Semi-National network	Magyar Katolikus Rádió Zrt		Community	Religious	Catholic full service							
Forrás Rádió	Tatabánya	Tatabánya 97,8 MHz; Komárom 90,5 MHz; Esztergom 98,1 MHz	Turul Média Kft.		Commercial	Local commercial	CHR							
Karc FM 88,3	Zalaegerszeg	Zalaegerszeg 88,3 MHz; Szombathely 97,1 MHz	Lánchíd Rádió Kft.	Karc FM	Community	Thematic commercial	Right-wing talk							
Mária Rádió Bakony	Ajka	Ajka 93,2 MHz; Várpalota 90,0 MHz	Magyarországi Mária Rádió Közhasznú Alapítvány	Mária Rádió	Community	Religious	Catholic prayer and talk and religious music							
Bajai Rádió	Baja	Baja 89,8 MHz	Baja Hangja Kft.		Commercial	Local commercial	mix							
94,3 Rádió 1	Baja	Baja 94,3 MHz	ALISCA NETWORK Kft.	Rádió 1	Commercial	Network commercial	CHR							
Megafon	Balassagyarmat	Balassagyarmat 95,7 MHz	Megafon Rádió Kft.		Commercial	Local commercial	mix							
Dráva Hullám 102.7	Barcs	Barcs 102,7 MHz	Lokátor Hírműhely Kft.		Commercial	Local commercial	mix							
CSABA RÁDIÓ	Békéscsaba	Békéscsaba 88,9 MHz	INTERAX Kft.		Commercial	Local commercial	mix							
98.4 Mega Rádió	Békéscsaba	Békéscsaba 98,4 MHz	TELEKOM BÉKÉS Kft.	+	Commercial	Local commercial	AC							
104,0 Rádió 1	Békéscsaba	Békéscsaba 104,0 MHz	Csaba Plus Kft.	Rádió 1	Commercial	Network commercial	CHR							
SOLA RÁDIÓ	Budapest	Budapest 101,6 MHz	FONTANA MÉDIA Kft.		Community	Religious	Religious talk and music							
Cegléd Rádió	Cegléd	Cegléd 92,5 MHz	Alföld Kapuja Rádió Kft.		Commercial	Local commercial	mix							
Mária Rádió Cegléd	Cegléd	Cegléd 88,3 MHz	Mária Rádió Frekvencia Kft.	Mária Rádió	Community	Religious	Catholic prayers and talk							
Mária Rádió Celldömölk	Celldömölk	Celldömölk 92,5 MHz	Mária Rádió Frekvencia Kft.	Mária Rádió	Community	Religious	Catholic prayers and talk							
Rádió Dabas	Dabas	Dabas 93,4 MHz	Dabas Sportcsarnok Nonprofit Kft.		Commercial	Local commercial	mix							
Magyar Katolikus Rádió 92,3 MHz	Debrecen	Debrecen 92,3 MHz	Magyar Katolikus Rádió Zrt.	Magyar Katolikus Rádió	Community	Religious	Catholic full service							
Európa Rádió 94,4	Debrecen	Debrecen 94,4 MHz	"EURÓPA RÁDIÓ" Nonprofit Közhasznú Kft.	Európa Rádió	Community	Religious	Calvinist full service							
FM90 Campus Rádió	Debrecen	Debrecen 90,0 MHz	Campus Rádió Nonprofit Kft.		Community	Commercial	mix							
104,6 - Best FM	Debrecen	Debrecen 104,6 MHz	Kredit Holding Kft.	Best FM	Commercial	Local commercial	mix							
FM 95 − Rádió 1 Debrecen	Debrecen	Debrecen 95,0 MHz	Médiacentrum Debrecen Kft.	Rádió 1	Commercial	Network commercial	CHR							
106,5 Rádió 1	Dunaföldvár	Dunaföldvár 106,5 MHz	ALISCA NETWORK Kft.	Rádió 1	Commercial	Network commercial	CHR							
93,1 Rádió 1	Dunaújváros	Dunaújváros 93,1 MHz	Dunapart Rádió Kft.	Rádió 1	Commercial	Network commercial	CHR							
Rádió 24	Dunaújváros	Dunaújváros 102,9 MHz	PENTAFON Kft.		Commercial	Local commercial	mix							
101,3 Rádió 1	Eger	Eger 101,3 MHz	FW Műsorszolgáltató Kft	Rádió 1	Commercial	Network commercial	CHR							
100,7 - BEST FM	Eger	Eger 100,7 MHz	FM7 Eger Kft	Best FM	Commercial	Local commercial	AC							
Mária Rádió Ibolya	Esztergom	Esztergom 97,4 MHz; Piliscsaba 104,2 MHZ; Dömös 104,9 MHz	Magyar Múzsa Kft.	Mária Rádió	Community	Religious	Catholic prayers and music							
Érd FM 101,3	Érd	Érd 101,3 MHz	Érdi Városi Televízió és Kulturális Nonprofit Kft.		Commercial	Local commercial	mix							
Rádió Som	Fehérgyarmat	Fehérgyarmat 99,5 MHz	Friends-Lan Kft.		Commercial	Local commercial	mix							
101,7 Rádió 1	Gyöngyös	Gyöngyös 101,7 MHz; Hatvan 87,9 MHz	FM7 Heves Kft.	Rádió 1	Commercial	Network commercial	CHR							
103,1 Rádió 1	Győr	Győr 103,1 MHz	Lajta Rádió Kft.	Rádió 1	Commercial	Network commercial	CHR							
Győr Plusz Rádió	Győr	Győr 100,1 MHz	PluszRádió Nonprofit Kft.		Commercial	Local commercial	CHR							
90.5 Gyula Rádió	Gyula	Gyula 90,5 MHz	TELEKOM BÉKÉS Kft.	+	Commercial	Local commercial	mix							
Hajdúsági Rádió 1	Hajdúszoboszló	Hajdúböszörmény 98,9 MHz; Hajdúnánás 93,3 MHz; Hajdúszoboszló 100,6 MHz; Derecske 94,7 MH	LB Rádió Kft.	Rádió 1	Commercial	Network commercial	CHR							
Rádió 7	Hódmezővásárhely	Hódmezővásárhely 97,6 MHz; Makó 96,8 MHz; Kistelek 107,0 MHz	Dél-alföldi Média Centrum Kft.		Commercial	Local commercial	mix							
TRIÓ Rádió	Jászberény	Jászberény 97,7 MHz	TRIÓ Rádió Kft.		Commercial	Local commercial	mix							
Korona FM 100	Kalocsa	Kalocsa 100,0 MHz	Kalocsai Rádió Bt.		Commercial	Local commercial	mix							
Rádió Most Kaposvár	Kaposvár	Kaposvár 91,2 MHz	Zselici Forrás Kft		Commercial	Local commercial	mix							
99,9 Rádió 1	Kaposvár	Kaposvár 99,9 MHz	Rádió Somogy Kft.	Rádió 1	Commercial	Network commercial	CHR							
Magyar Katolikus Rádió 102,6 MHz	Kaposvár	Kaposvár 102,6 MHz	Magyar Katolikus Rádió Zrt.	Magyar Katolikus Rádió	Community	Religious	Catholic full service							
Rábaköz Rádió FM94,5	Kapuvár	Kapuvár 94,5 MHz	Kapukom Kft.		Commercial	Local commercial	mix							
Aktív Rádió 93,8	Karcag	Karcag 93,8 MHz	"VIACOM" Kft.	+	Commercial	Local commercial	Hot AC							
Gong Rádió	Kecskemét	Kecskemét 96,5 MHz; Nagykőrös 93,6 MHz; Gyömrő 97,2 MHz; Csongrád 87,6 MHz; Kecel 99,6 MHz; Baja 88,7 MHz; Solt 94,1 MHz	GONG RÁDIÓ Kft.		Commercial	Local commercial	mix							
99,4 Rádió 1	Keszthely	Keszthely 99,4 MHz	LB Rádió Kft.	Rádió 1	Commercial	Network commercial	CHR							
Mária Rádió Helikon	Keszthely	Keszthely 93,4 MHz	Mária Rádió Frevencia Kft	Mária Rádió	Community	Religious	Catholic prayers and religious music							
Kunság Rádió	Kiskőrös	Kiskőrös 97,0 MHz	Kunság-Média Nonprofit Kft.		Commercial	Local commercial	mix							
91,1 Rádió 1 Sirius	Kiskunfélegyháza	Kiskunfélegyháza 91,1 MHz	FÉLEGYHÁZI HÍRLAP Kft.	Rádió 1	Commercial	Network commercial	CHR							
HALAS RÁDIÓ	Kiskunhalas	Kiskunhalas 92,9 MHz	Halas Rádió Nonprofit Kft.		Community	Local commercial	mix							
88,2 Rádió 1	Kiskunmajsa	Kiskunmajsa 88,2 MHz	FÉLEGYHÁZI HÍRLAP Kft.	Rádió 1	Commercial	Network commercial	CHR							
Szent István Rádió - Kisújszállás	Kisújszállás	Kisújszállás 103,2 MHz; Törökszentmiklós 96,4 MHz	Magyar Katolikus Rádió Alapítvány		Community	Religious	Catholic full service							
Friss FM	Kisvárda	Kisvárda 93,4 MH	FRISS MÉDIA Kft.		Community	Local commercial	mix							
Mária Rádió Nefelejcs	Komárom	Komárom 88,3 MHz	Mária Rádió Frekvencia Kft.	Mária Rádió	Community	Religious	Catholic prayers and talk							
99,4 Rádió 1	Komló	Komló 99,4 MHz; Mohács 93,8 MHz	Mambó Rádió Kft.	Rádió 1	Commercial	Network Commercial	CHR							
Körmend FM	Körmend	Körmend 99,8 MHz	Rádió 8 Körmend Kft		Commercial	Local commercial	mix							
Mária Rádió Tulipán	Monor	Monor 106,3 MHz; Gyál 98,9 MHz; Dabas 97,5 MHz	Mária Rádió Frekvencia Kft.	Mária Rádió	Community	Religious	Catholic prayers and talk							
Mária Rádió Mór	Mór	Mór 92,9 MHz	Mária Rádió Frekvencia Kft.	Mária Rádió	Community	Religious	Catholic prayers and talk							
95,6 Rádió 1	Nagykanizsa	Nagykanizsa 95,6 MHz	dtm Media Hungary Kft	Rádió 1	Commercial	Network commercial	CHR							
99,4 Sunshine FM	Nyíregyháza	Nyíregyháza 99,4 MHz	SUNSHINE RÁDIÓ Kft.		Commercial	Local commercial	mix							
103,9 Best FM	Nyíregyháza	Nyíregyháza 103,9 MHz	CENTER-RÁDIÓ Kft.	Best FM	Commercial	Local commercial	AC							
91,1 Rádió 1	Nyíregyháza	Nyíregyháza 91,1 MHz	Zenebolygó Kft.	Rádió 1	Commercial	Network commercial	CHR							
90.2 Mega Rádió	Orosháza	Orosháza 90,2 MHz	"A-tól Z-ig" Bt.	+	Commercial	Local commercial	AC							
Magyar Katolikus Rádió 88,6	Orosháza	Orosháza 88,6 MHz	Magyar Katolikus Rádió Zrt	Magyar Katolikus Rádió	Commercial	Religious	Catholic full service							
PAKS FM	Paks	Paks 96,3 MHz	Paks FM Kft		Commercial	Local commercial	mix							
107,5 Rádió 1	Paks	Paks 107,5 MHz	ALISCA NETWORK Kft.	Rádió 1	Commercial	Network commercial	CHR							
Mária Rádió Pápa	Pápa	Pápa 90,8 MHz	Mária Rádió Frekvencia Kft.	Mária Rádió	Community	Religious	Catholic prayers and talk							
Mária Rádió Rózsa	Pécel	Pécel 91,7 MHz	Mária Rádió Frekvencia Kft	Mária Rádió	Community	Religious	Catholic prayers and talk							
90,6 RÁDIÓ 1	Pécs	Pécs 90,6 MHz; Villány 100,9 MHz	Mambó Rádió Kft	Rádió 1	Commercial	Network commercial	CHR							
100,4 Rádió 1	Salgótarján	Salgótarján 100,4 MHz	Helyi Rádió Műsorszolgáltató Kft.	Rádió 1	Commercial	Network commercial	CHR							
Mária Rádió Sárvár	Sárvár	Sárvár 95,2 MHz	Mária Rádió Frekvencia Kft.	Mária Rádió	Community	Religious	Catholic prayers and talk							
Sárvár Rádió	Sárvár	Sárvár 96,5 MHz.	Sárvári Média Nonprofit Kft.		Commercial	Local commercial	mix							
Európa Rádió FM 100,0	Sátoraljaújhely	Sátoraljaújhely 100,0 MHz	EURÓPA RÁDIÓ" Nonprofit Közhasznú Kft.	Európa Rádió	Commercial	Religious	Calvinist talk and music							
Rádió 1 Sopron 94,1 MHz	Sopron	Sopron 94,1 MHz	PANNON-SOPRON Kft.	Rádió 1	Commercial	Network commercial	CHR							
Rádió 88	Szeged	Szeged 95,4 MHz	TELEKOM Kft.		Commercial	Local commercial	Hot AC							
87,9 Rádió 1	Szeged	Szeged 87,9 MHz	SZEGRÓPA Műsorszolgáltató Nonprofit Kft.	Rádió 1	Commercial	Network commercial	CHR							
Karc FM 100.2	Szeged	Szeged 100,2 MHz	Lánchíd Rádió Kft.	Karc FM	Community	Thematic Commercial	Right-wing talk							
94.5 Rádió 1	Székesfehérvár	Székesfehérvár 94,5 MHz	FEHÉRVÁR RÁDIÓ Kft.	Rádió 1	Commercial	Network commercial	CHR							
101,8 BEST FM	Székesfehérvár	Székesfehérvár 101,8 MHz	VLNC FM Rádió Kft.	Best FM	Commercial	Local commercial	AC							
Vörösmarty Rádió	Székesfehérvár	Székesfehérvár 99,2 MHz	Fejér Megyei Önkormányzatok Kegyeleti Központ Kft.		Commercial	Local commercial	mix							
Rádió Antritt	Szekszárd	Szekszárd 105,1 MHz	Rádió Antritt Kft.		Commercial	Local commercial	Hot AC							
91,1 Rádió 1	Szekszárd	Szekszárd 91,1 MHz	ALISCA NETWORK Kft.		Commercial	Network commercial	CHR							
RADIO MONOŠTER	Szentgotthárd	Szentgotthárd 106,6 MHz; Felsőszölnök 97,7 MHz	Szlovén Rádió Közhasznú Nonprofit Kft.		Community	Ethnic	Slovenian ethnic							
Lakihegy Rádió	Szigetszentmiklós	Szigetszentmiklós 107,0 MHz	Lakihegy Rádió Bt.		Commercial	Local commercial	mix							
90,4 Rádió 1	Szolnok	Szolnok 90,4 MHz	LB Rádió Kft.	Rádió 1	Commercial	Network commercial	CHR							
AKTÍV RÁDIÓ	Szolnok	Szolnok 92,2 MHz	"VIACOM" Kft	+	Commercial	Local commercial	Hot AC							
102.4 Best FM	Szolnok	Szolnok 102,4 MHz	Amadeus Rádió Kft	Best FM	Commercial	Local commercial	AC							
97,7 Rádió 1	Szombathely	Szombathely 97,7 MHz	Vasi Friss Rádió Műsorszolg. Kft.	Rádió 1	Commercial	Network commercial	CHR							
Mária Rádió Savaria	Szombathely	Szombathely 88,4 MHz	Mária Rádió Frekvencia Kft.		Community	Religious	Catholic talk and religious music							
Tamási Rádió	Tamási	Tamási 101,9 MHz	Tamási Rádió Kft		Commercial	Local commercial	mix							
96,7 Rádió 1	Tatabánya	Tatabánya 96,7 MHz	LB Rádió Kft.	Rádió 1	Commercial	Network commercial	CHR							
Mária Rádió Zemplén	Telkibánya	Telkibánya 100,6 MHz	Médiahíd Kft.	Mária Rádió	Community	Religious	Catholic prayers and talk							
88.7 MHz, 89.2 MHz Rádió 1	Tiszafüred	Tiszafüred 88,7 MHz; Abádszalók 89,2 MHz	Auris Média Kft.	Rádió 1	Commercial	Network commercial	CHR							
AKTÍV RÁDIÓ 102.2	Tiszakécske	Tiszakécske 102,2 MHz	"VIACOM" Kft.	+	Commercial	Local commercial	Hot AC							
Szent István Rádió–Tokaj	Tokaj	Tokaj 101,8 MHz	Hegyalja Média Kft	Szent István R.	Community	Religious	Catholic full service							
Dunakanyar Rádió	Vác	Vác 94,1 MHz	Dunakanyar Rádió Kft.		Commercial	Local commercial	mix							
90,4 Rádió 1	Velence	Velence 90,4 MHz	"B & T" Kft.	Rádió 1	Commercial	Network commercial	CHR							
90,6 Rádió 1	Veszprém	Veszprém 90,6 MHz	LB Rádió Kft.	Rádió 1	Commercial	Network commercial	CHR							
Mária Rádió Völgyhíd	Veszprém	Veszprém 95,1 MHz	FM 4 Rádió Szolgáltató Kft.	Mária Rádió	Community	Religious	Catholic prayers and talk							
Méz Rádió	Veszprém	Veszprém 103,1 MHz	Veszprém Rádió Kft.		Commercial	Local commercial	mix							
95,8 Rádió 1	Zalaegerszeg	Zalaegerszeg 95,8 MHz	Rádió Zala Egyszemélyes Kft.	Rádió 1	Commercial	Network commercial	CHR							
EGERSZEG RÁDIÓ	Zalaegerszeg	Zalaegerszeg 95,1 MHz	Zalaegerszegi Televízió és Rádió Kft.		Commercial	Local commercial	CHR							
88,9 - Best FM	Zalaegerszeg	Zalaegerszeg 88,9 MHz	Zala LB Kft.	Best FM	Commercial	Commercial	mix							
Pont Rádió	Mezőtúr	Mezőtúr 89,9 MHz	ACTOR INFORMATIKA ÉS NYOMDA Kft		Small Community	Local	mix							
ALPHA RÁDIÓ	Székesfehérvár	Székesfehérvár 88,9 MHz	ALBA REGIA Műsorszolgáltató Kft.		Small Community	Local	mix							
Berettyó Rádió	Berettyóújfalu	Berettyóújfalu 97,9 MHz	Kogyilla Zsolt		Small Community	Local	mix							
Spirit FM	Budapest	Budapest 87,6 MHz	Közösségi Rádiózásért Egyesület		Small Community	Thematic talk	Talk							
Mustár Rádió	Nyíregyháza	Nyíregyháza 89,6 MHz	Kulturális Életért Közhasznú Egyesület		Small Community	Local	mix							
KARCAG FM	Karcag	Karcag 88,0 MHz	KUN-MÉDIA Kft.		Small Community	Local	mix							
Táska Rádió	Székesfehérvár	Székesfehérvár 97,5 MHz	Lánczos Kornél Gimnázium		Small Community	Highschool	mix							
MaxiRádió	Gyöngyös	Gyöngyös 92,4 MHz	Mátra Média Kulturális Egyesület		Small Community	Local	mix							
Első Pesti Egyetemi Rádió	Budapest	Budapest 97,0 MHz	Media Universalis Alapítvány		Small Community	University	Open university							
Rádió Szarvas	Szarvas	Szarvas 105,4 MHz	Mediorix Szolgáltató Bt.		Small Community	Local	mix							
RÁDIÓ SMILE	Kiskunfélegyháza	Kiskunfélegyháza 89,9 MHz	Mosoly Média Kft.		Small Community	Local	mix							
RÁDIÓ TÖRÖKSZENTMIKLÓS	Törökszentmiklós	Törökszentmiklós 89,6 MHz	RÁDIÓ HORIZONT Kft.		Small Community	Local	mix							
BALATON RÁDIÓ	Siófok	Siófok 88,7 MHz	Balaton Rádió Kft.		Small Community	Local	mix							
CREDO RÁDIÓ	Szombathely	Szombathely 98,8 MHz	Szombathelyi Evangélikus Egyházközség		Small Community	Religious	Evangelical talk and music							
Kossuth Rádió	Budapest	National FM + AM network	Duna Médiaszolgáltató Nonprofit Zrt.		Public service	State-run govt controlled	Full service talk							
Petőfi Rádió	Budapest	National FM network	Duna Médiaszolgáltató Nonprofit Zrt.		Public service	State-run govt controlled	Pop music / Youth program							
Bartók Rádió	Budapest	National FM natwork	Duna Médiaszolgáltató Nonprofit Zrt.		Public service	State-run govt controlled	Classical music							
Dankó Rádió	Budapest	National FM + AM network	Duna Médiaszolgáltató Nonprofit Zrt.		Public service	State-run govt controlled	Folk, operetta and pop-folk							
Nemzetiségi Rádió	Budapest	National AM network	Duna Médiaszolgáltató Nonprofit Zrt.		Public service	State-run govt controlled	13 ethnic languages							
Parlamenti Rádió	Budapest	Internet only	Duna Médiaszolgáltató Nonprofit Zrt.		Public service	State-run govt controlled	Parliamentary broadcast and jazz	103.9 Rock FM	Budapest	Budapest 103,9	LBK Rock KFT	Commercial	Thematic Commercial	Rock/Heavy Metal
