= Petőfi Rádió =

Hungarian national radio station

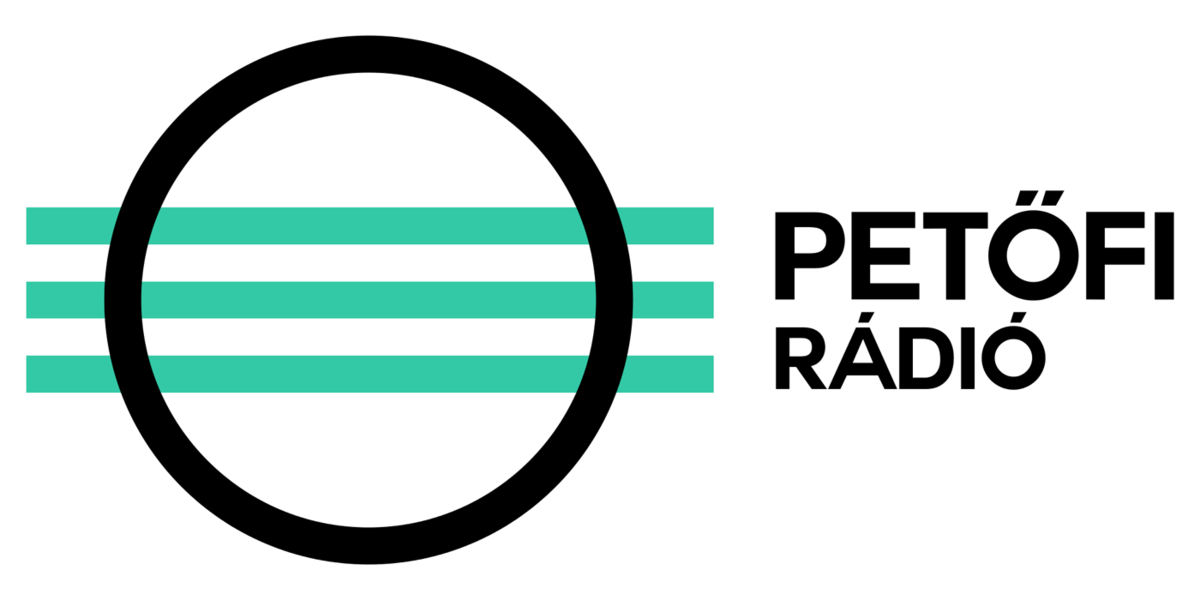
- Budapest; Hungary
- Broadcast area: Central Europe
- Frequency: 94.8 MHz (FM) in Budapest

Programming
- Language: Hungarian
- Format: Music
- Affiliations: EBU

Ownership
- Owner: Hungarian Radio and Television

History
- Founded: 1932
- First air date: 22 December 1934; 91 years ago
- Former names: Budapest II. (1932–1949); MR2-Petőfi Rádió (2007–2011)
- Former frequencies: 67.4 MHz (FM, in Budapest)

Technical information
- Power: 2000 kW
- Repeater: 16 FM transmitters

Links
- Website: Official website

Petőfi Rádió (formerly known as MR2-Petőfi Rádió and Budapest II.) is a public-broadcasting radio station in Hungary, concentrating on music and related programming, largely aimed at a younger demographic. It is one of the seven national radio channels owned and operated by Hungarian Radio and Television, and was founded in 1932 as Budapest II., before adopting its current name in 1949, an homage to poet Sándor Petőfi. Programming includes music from young Hungarian talents, as well as mainstream and underground Hungarian music. Its signal is received through FM radio, the internet and satellite.

== History ==
=== Beginnings ===
Test broadcasts started on 14 February 1932 with a 3 kW transmitter under the name Budapest II., with 2-3 hours of recorded music per week, broadcasting on 210 m wavelength (1427.5 kc). On 16 December 1934, broadcasts moved to a 20 kW transmitter formerly used by Budapest I., on the 834.5 m wavelength (359.5 kc). Official regular broadcasts started on 22 December. On 1 February 1949, it adopted the name Petőfi Rádió after the poet Sándor Petőfi.

On 27 August 1949, a 135 kW transmitter broadcasting on 1040 kHz was inaugurated in Szolnok, east of Budapest, with a height of 126 meters. On 15 March 1950, the station moved to on 1187 kHz. In 1951, a further transmitter was set up in Balatonszabadi, using materials from the Lakihegy Tower, broadcasting on 146 m. On 24 October 1953, its transmitter increased to 135 kW and moved to 872 kHz, later moved again to 1250 kHz. In 1989, the transmitter was handed over to Juventus Rádió (810 kHz) and is currently used by Kossuth Rádió as a reserve transmitter. Petőfi in 1986 started broadcasting from a new 1251 kHz transmitter with a power of 500 kW to cover the Transdanubian region.

=== Early youth programs ===
Budapest II. in 1947 started airing Rádió Gyermekújsága, Rádióiskola started in July that year. These were considered to be among the first children and youth programs on Hungarian radio. The 1950s were marked by the broadcasts of Világifjúsági Találkozó and Főiskolai Világbajnokságról, and in 1954, the Radio Youth Choir was founded. Later, in 1958 the children's program Varázsszem (Magic Eye) made its debut. The station added an extra hour to its programming in 1959 and Rádióiskola continued.

In the 1960s, the youth program on Sundays Táskarádió appeared. 1962 saw the Rádióiskola gaining a counterpart for older listeners, Rádióegyetem with individual departments for literature, science, knowledge and music. 1965 saw the beginning of Húszas Stúdió for the 14-20 demographic.

The number of youth programs increased after 1975, with the creation of an afternoon slot, then in 1976, Ötödik sebesség premiered to absorb all of its interview programs. The program became a huge success, and is considered to be the ancestor of similar shows on Hungarian radio in subsequent years.

=== Before the 2007 restructuring ===
Petőfi Rádió started broadcasting a 24-hour schedule in 1984, with music overnight and hourly news bulletins. The expansion to a 24-hour schedule saw the introduction of new programs, such as Gondolat-jel, Péntektől-péntekig and Bagoly. In August 1986, Reggeli csúcs premiered in the mornings. 1989 saw the beginning of Gordiusz an educational program for the youth.

In the 1970s and 80s, Petőfi also aired a three-hour request show once a week, as well as a one-hour midday program aimed at Romanis. Petőfi's structure was not consistent, meaning that it had no clear demographic to target: the station aired programs for the youth, the elderly and minority interest groups, as well as live broadcast of NB 1 Liga matches. B. Tóth László's popular program Poptarisznya, now on Retro Rádió, as well as Csiszár Jenő's Apukám világa, were popular in the 1990s.

Until 1982, the sports department was part of Magyar Rádió's political unit. In the same year, the entertainment department split from the literary department and merged with the sports department, delivering sports programming without depending on political programming.

In 1996, it started test broadcasts on 94.8 MHz in the Western European FM standard. The former OIRT FM transmitters were switched off in 1998, moving only to the CCIR standard. The AM signals were switched off in 1999.

At the turn of the millennium, although Petőfi had a significant number of programs catered to the youth, it was considered to be a station for the elderly. A radical change happened in 2007, where the mixed programming format was replaced by a 24-hour music format, aimed largely at the youth with the aim of promoting the Hungarian music scene, especially promising talents from the national and international scenes.

=== The 2007 restructure ===
==== MR2 - Nagyon zene (Very Music) ====
In the summer of 2007, Magyar Rádió initiated a reform of its radio stations, with the station becoming MR2-Petőfi Rádió, adopting "Nagyon zene" (Very Music) as its slogan. The new style attracted the youth, enabling it to compete with commercial radio stations. The directors thought it was important to promote the Hungarian pop scene, which for the most part was forgotten from the general public. The station now targeted young adults who are receptive to the new, quality music, that provides a musical alternative on the Hungarian radio market. With its diverse musical composition, it presented the latest and most successful musical offerings from Europe and all over the world, with special emphasis on young national talents. Among the new programs, there was Akusztik, Selector, Kultúrfitnesz and Eleven, while the only survivor from the old Petőfi was Netidők.

==== Conflict with ORTT ====
The National Radio and Television Council (ORTT) noted that Petőfi was not following license recommendations, initiating a lawsuit against the station. In a public opinion survey in March 2009, the majority of respondents stated that a public radio station with such a profile was needed. MR2-Petőfi Rádió celebrated the second anniversary of its reformat on 1 June 2009, and, up until then, everything has gone according to plan for the station. Magyar Rádió won an appeal against ORTT on 17 June: according to the capital court, the ORTT took a position on an issue over which it has no jurisdiction. The court also objected that the decision established the violation for a single day. On the other hand, the documents revealed that ORTT examined several months of programs. The court upheld the argument of Hungarian Radio that the institution must meet the requirement of diversity not on individual channels, but on the whole of broadcasting. After the verdict was announced, György Such, the president of Magyar Rádió, assessed the decision as a victory for common sense and legislation.

==== After the rise of Fidesz/Orbán ====
After the 2010 Hungarian parliamentary election in which Fidesz won, the station went past a number of changes, but the alternative/urban programming line continued. With the creation of MTVA in 2011, the MR2 name gradually disappeared, with its official name becoming Petőfi Rádió. In 2012, a new program structure was announced, with the program names being related to its namesake Sándor Petőfi: Talpra Magyar, Egész úton - hazafelé, Ej, mi a COOL? (name based on Anyám tyúkja/My Mother's Farm). On 15 March 2013, all of Magyar Rádió's stations changed their audio branding. In 2014, it created its own talent show, Nagy-Szín-Pad, whose winner had the chance to take part in several festivals. It also carried live coverage of VOLT, Strand - Nagyon zene fesztivált and Balaton Sound, being responsible for its live production. helyén kerül megrendezésre minden augusztus végén. On 15 March 2015, M2 Petőfi TV started broadcasting past 8pm on the M2 channel, with the help of the station's team. On 1 July 2015, editorial control was now put under Duna Médiaszolgáltató.

Életed ritmusa(Rhythm of your life)

Mid-February 2016 the mainly alternative music supply was gradually filled with pop and dance music known from mainstream radios. The alternative music was restricted to only dawn and night hours, there was no change in the program structure till another 3 months(at this time the radio's listening began to drop) In May 27. 2016 they announced that on May 30 the radio will fully change. The radio fully changed on May 30, midnight with new broadcasters new signals and a new slogan. The new slogan became Életed ritmusa. Zoltán Pető the CEO at the time said he wanted to express that they try to set the programs to the listeners needs. Many old radio hosts left from the staff like Gergely Horváth (who was the chief editor for years at the radio) Márton Buda, Bálint Juhász, Tamás Szabó, Kriszta Babucs, Tamás Szabó, Tímea Leirer and László Popovics

In the Fall of 2016 the program Akusztik came back but they aired it from the A38 and the concerts recorded there, furthermore they repeat it on M2 Petőfi. On 4 November 2016, the radio changed the signals and sounds that they began using in March 2013.

A Te Slágered! (Your Hit!)

On 1 June 2017, Titusz Tiszttartó became the radio's CEO. On 6 November 2017 the radio got renewed again and they began using the new slogan. He said that the change was necessary because as a national music radio they need to take it seriously what the listeners want. At the beginning of 2018, new broadcasters came to the radio, in January Győző Szabó joined to the Talpra Magyar crew. In February, Kiki the singer of the band Első Emelet joined who was the leader of Dalra Magyar.

Since 10 September 2018 the radio on Mondays between midnight and 1 am airs Jazz music titled Petőfi Jazz. In September 2019 Feró Nagy joined the crew who hosted the program titled Garázs in the 1980s. His new program, titled Petőfi Rock airs on Sunday nights. In January 2020 Dávid Sipos Günther announced that after 8 years he will leave the radio. At the same time on January 14 they established a new schedule and a new everyday hitlist and some programs were deleted. On 6 May 2020, they fired Győző Szabó so Levente Harsányi and Tamás Bikfalvi lead Dalra Magyar .

=== The radio's repositioning ===
Reopening to young people

On 12 March 2021, on an online press conference they announced that the radio will again transform. Thanks to the Duna Média, The MTVA, and the Petőfi Literary Museum shared project the radio moved to the A38, In this program the radio will air more cultural programs and more Hungarian music. The Petőfi Rádió and M2 Petőfi's new CEO became Ádám Béli as of 1 April 2021.

The radio's music supply was expanded with the 2016 pre-transform music supply so these alternative/indie hits can be heard again and many fresh music was added. In the Spring of 2021, the radio's sound began to change. On June 1 (the music radio's 14th birthday) they changed the general signals, then a couple weeks after, they announced that for the summer some new programs were starting and two radio hosts Dávid Bekker and Máté Habóczki would join. The weekly toplist became four hours again and four new programs started.

Zenében Első! (First in Music!)

In October 2021 they announced that M2 Petőfi along with the radio station will transform again, with new programs and sounds. On November 3 the radio began using the slogan Zenében első and new, mostly young radio hosts joined like Gergő Varga and Janka Faragó and László Fekete who was hosting the program titled Selector before 2016. They started new programs: At 5 AM live broadcasting plays and after that Dávid Bekker hosts the renewed morning show. At night mostly cultural programs play and after that till midnight different mixes can be heard. In the renewed signals Fanni Walla's singing voice can be heard. Ádám Béli said: "Petőfi thinks that the target audience - which is built up by young people - They can truly serve authentically when - the programs are made by young people like them. At that time many old radio host left like Dóra Péczeli who was at the radio for 13 years and Levente Harsányi and Tamás Bikfalvi left the morning show, plus Bálint Iller, Csaba Boros and Béla Patkó also left.

In June 2022, after the Pentecost weekend, the radio changed to summer schedule, new shows started and many radio hosts joined, three new hitlist, health and lifestyle magazine and alternative music program enriches the radio's offering. At the 200th anniversary of Sándor Petőfi's birth, a cultural magazine show titled Talpig Magyar with the contribution of the Petőfi Média Group and with the support of the Petőfi Kultúrális Ügynökség. In addition a new rock program in which a Hungarian rock magazine titled HammerWorld's two editors wait for the listeners and the lovers of this genre. In Fall a new show would start titled Befutó in which emerging and underground performers novelty would be the topic. in addition the newly started shows are still on the air.

Outsourced program production

In the Fall of 2022 they announced that in the future instead of the MTVA the Petőfi Média Group will be the Petőfi Rádió, the M2 Petőfi and the Petőfi LIVE webpage content creator. Meanwhile, at the public media they replaced Ádám Béli from his CEO post. His successor is unknown for now.

2023 - Petőfi- commemorative year

On 1 January 2023, for the honor of Petőfi they brought back the old shows which resemble Petőfi's poems like Ej mi a COOL, Talpra Magyar and Egész utón - hazafelé. The schedule strongly resembles the pre-2016 times. On Monday nights a show called Petőfi Kult can be heard after that thematic shows can be heard instead of the mix shows. The show called Vadonat came back which deals with Hungarian music novelty. At this time a podcast show called Petőfi Podcast can be heard on Monday nights. The radio host Dóra Péczeli after one year came back to the radio. Some new shows can also be heard such as Holnapután, Itt születtem, and Petőfi Paletta

In April MTVA and the Petőfi Média Group broke the contract, so in May the IKO Broadcast Centrum makes the programs for the M2 Petőfi and Petőfi Rádió. In addition Dóra Péczeli and Ádám Rédl left the radio and Zsolt Dominik became the CEO and the chief editor.

As a Hungarian Music radio

Petőfi Rádió - Minden magyar (Everything's Hungarian)

In September 2023 it came out that the new management will break the previous concept and will only play Hungarian music. After 16 years the oldest music editor Atilla Borcsik left the radio and in addition most of the staff members were also fired. The schedule was changed (Akusztik on Saturday, and Holnapután can be heard Sunday night). With this new direction the sounds and the signals were changed and the slogan became Minden magyar.

After seven years the cultural show titled Kultúrfitnesz, led by Roland Szani and many new hosts, joined the radio; such as Kitti Király from radio Best FM.

On 13 September 2024, Bence Kisbali left the radio after three years. Kolos Kenéz, who took his place, can be heard on two broadcast channels.

On 14 October 2024, the radio's schedule was changed. The one hour midnight jazz music selection came back titled as Szakcsi Jazzóra, meanwhile on weekends a one-hour children's show called Csukás Meseóra. A healt magazine called Befordultam a konyhára in which not just Kitti Király but chefs also recommend healthy foods. in addition they reduced Kultúrfitnesz repeat running time to one hour.

== See also ==
- Magyar Televízió
- Eastern Bloc information dissemination
