= Attila Henrik Szabó =

Hungarian writer

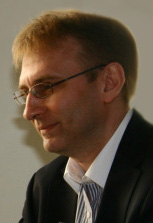
- Attila Henrik Szabó, 2009
- Born: 31 January 1970 (age 56); Budapest, Hungary
- Occupations: writer, translator, television and radio journalist, producer, communications expert
- Writing career
- Pen name: Kornel Pesti
- Website: szah.weebly.com

Attila Henrik Szabó (born January 31, 1970) is a Hungarian born writer, translator, television and radio journalist, producer, communications expert.

== Life ==
Attila Henrik Szabó was born in Budapest. He graduated from the university of Debrecen in 1994. He taught English language at a Budapest city highschool and a popular private language school for over three years. He studied translation and interpretation from Istvan Geher at Hungary's leading university, ELTE from 1994 to 1996. He completed the Hungarian Radio course in Radio Journalism and the BBC World Service course in Television and Radio Journalism and Basic Broadcast Techniques in 1996. He worked as an editor at the Hungarian Radio then he secured a job with the Hungarian Television. Soon after the first Hungarian commercial television channels were established in 1997 he became a producer at TV2 (Hungary), the first commercial terrestrial channel available. He published several articles and books of many genres. He worked for Weber Shandwick, England's leading PR agency from 2008 to 2011. He translated television series (Discovery Channel, Discovery Science, Discovery World) from English into Hungarian. He is an author of several popular books in Hungary. In 2012 he moved to the UK and lives there with his family.

== Media career ==
- Népszabadság (Peoples' Freefom) (1995–1997) – political daily, journalist
- 168 óra (168 Hours) (1995–1997) – political weekly, journalist
- Szonda (The Probe, Hungarian Radio) (1995–1998) – science, editor
- Mindennapi Tudomány (Every Day Science, Hungarian Radio) (1995–1998) – science, editor
- Krónika (Chronicles, Hungarian Radio) (1995–1998) – news, editor
- Reggeli csúcs (Morning Peak, Hungarian Radio) (1995–1996) – news, editor
- Tudományos Híradó (Science News, Hungarian Television) (1996–1998) – science news, editor
- Híradó (Evening News, Hungarian Television) (1996–1998) – news, editor
- Delta (Delta, Hungarian Television) (1996–1998) – science, editor
- Repeta (Repeat IT, Hungarian Television) (1996–1998) – education, editor
- Mélyvíz (Deep Water, Hungarian Television) (1996–1998) – talk show, editor
- Miénk itt a tér (This Place Is Ours, Duna TV) (1996–1998) – education, editor
- A-Z tudományos magazin (A-Z Science News, TV2 (Hungary)) (1997–1998) – science, editor
- Tények (Evening News, TV2) (1997–1999) – news, editor
- Klik informatikai magazin (Click, TV2) (1997–1998) – IT magazine, editor
- Kuk@c informatikai magazin (@, TV2 (Hungary)) (1997–1998) – IT magazine, producer
- Háló@Világ informatikai magazin (Web@World, TV2 (Hungary)) (1999–2001) – IT magazine, producer
- ModemIdők (Modem Times, Hungarian Radio) (1999) – IT magazine, producer
- InfoKrónika (InfoChronicles, Hungarian Radio) (1999) – IT news, producer
- Jó reggelt, Magyarország! (Good Morning Hungary, TV2 (Hungary)) (2000) – news, producer
- Informatikai Híradó (IT News, Hungarian Television) (2005) – news, producer

== Public relations ==
- Media and crisis management trainings for company executives from 1998
- Weber Shandwick (2008–2010) – Senior Advisor, Head of Media and Creative

== Translations ==
- Poems (1998–)
- Books (1998–)
- Television series and one offs (Science) (Discovery Channel, Discovery World, Discovery Science) from English into Hungarian (2011–)

== Awards, memberships ==
- Joseph Pulitzer Memorial Award, (1998) Radio Journalist, Hungarian Radio
- Member of the British Mensa

== Books published ==
- Idézetek könyve (Big Book of Quotes) (1998) – 400 pages
- Idézetek könyve (Big Book of Quotes) (2002) – 399 pages, ISBN 9789639262379
- Nagy emberek nagy mondásai (Great Sayings from Great Men) (2009) – 208 pages, ISBN 9789639898141
- Öreg néne Győzikéje, válogatott celebmesék (Celebrity Tales) (2011) – 168 pages, ISBN 9789630825870

== Sources ==
- Kreatív Magazin (Creative, marketing magazine)
- Attila Henrik Szabó's resume on Prezi
- Article, Weborvos (WebDoctor)
- Magyarul Bábelben (Hungarian Tower of Babel) – poems translated by Attila Henrik Szabó
- Dokk.hu – Attila Henrik Szabó
- Index.hu
- Weebly

== Other relevant information ==
- Celeb 24 – Öreg néne Győzikéje (Celebrity Tales)
- Attila Henrik Szabó's Books
- Libri Aranykönyv (Libri Golden Book Award) 2011
- Comedy Central
