= Tade =

Tade may refer to

- Tade (name)
- Tade, Estonia, a village
- Mazsola és Tádé, a Hungarian puppet animated film made around 1970
- Persicaria hydropiper, or water pepper, known in Japanese as tade.
