= Nationality Broadcasts =

- Hungary
- Frequencies: 873 kHz (in Pécs and Budapest); 1188 kHz (in Marcali and Szolnok); 1350 kHz (in Győr)

Programming
- Format: News, Talk
- Affiliations: European Broadcasting Union

Ownership
- Owner: Hungarian Radio and Television

History
- First air date: 1 February 2007

Links
- Website: mediaklikk.hu/nemzetisegiradio

Nationality Broadcasts (Hungarian: Nemzetiségi Adások) or Nationality Radio (Nemzetiségi Rádió), formerly MR4 is a public-broadcasting radio station in Hungary. It addresses every state-forming minority in Hungary in its own native language. The radio broadcasts news and programmes in German, Slovak, Polish, Serbian, Ukrainian, Rusyn, Romanian, Slovenian, Greek, Armenian, Bulgarian, Croatian, and Romani.

== History ==
The radio was separated from Kossuth Rádió's ethnic minority broadcasts.

== Programming ==
=== Hungarian-language programmes ===
- Egy hazában(In one country), magazine programme
- Gyöngyszemek (Gems), minority literature programme
- Nemzetiségek ünnepei (Holidays of nationalities)
- Nemzetiségek zenéje (Music of nationalities)

=== Minority language programmes ===
- Három szólamra (For three parts), Hungarian, Lovari and Boyash-language programme
- Armenian programme
- Bulgarian programme
- Croatian programme
- German programme
- Greek programme
- Polish programme
- Romanian programme
- Rusyn programme
- Serbian programme
- Slovak programme
- Slovenian programme
- Ukrainian programme

== See also ==
- Hungarian Radio and Television
- Minorities in Hungary
