= Attila Szabó =

Attila Szabó may refer to:

- Attila Szabó (athlete) (born 1984), Hungarian decathlete
- Attila Szabó (Hungarian canoeist) (born 1963), Hungarian sprint canoer
- Attila Szabó (Slovak canoeist) (born 1966), Czechoslovak-Slovak sprint canoer
- Attila Henrik Szabó (born 1970), Hungarian writer and journalist
- Attila Szabo (scientist), Hungarian-American biophysicist
- Attila Szabó (politician), Hungarian politician, founder of the Tisza Party
