= Médiaszolgáltatás-támogató és Vagyonkezelő Alap =

Hungarian public broadcasting media organization

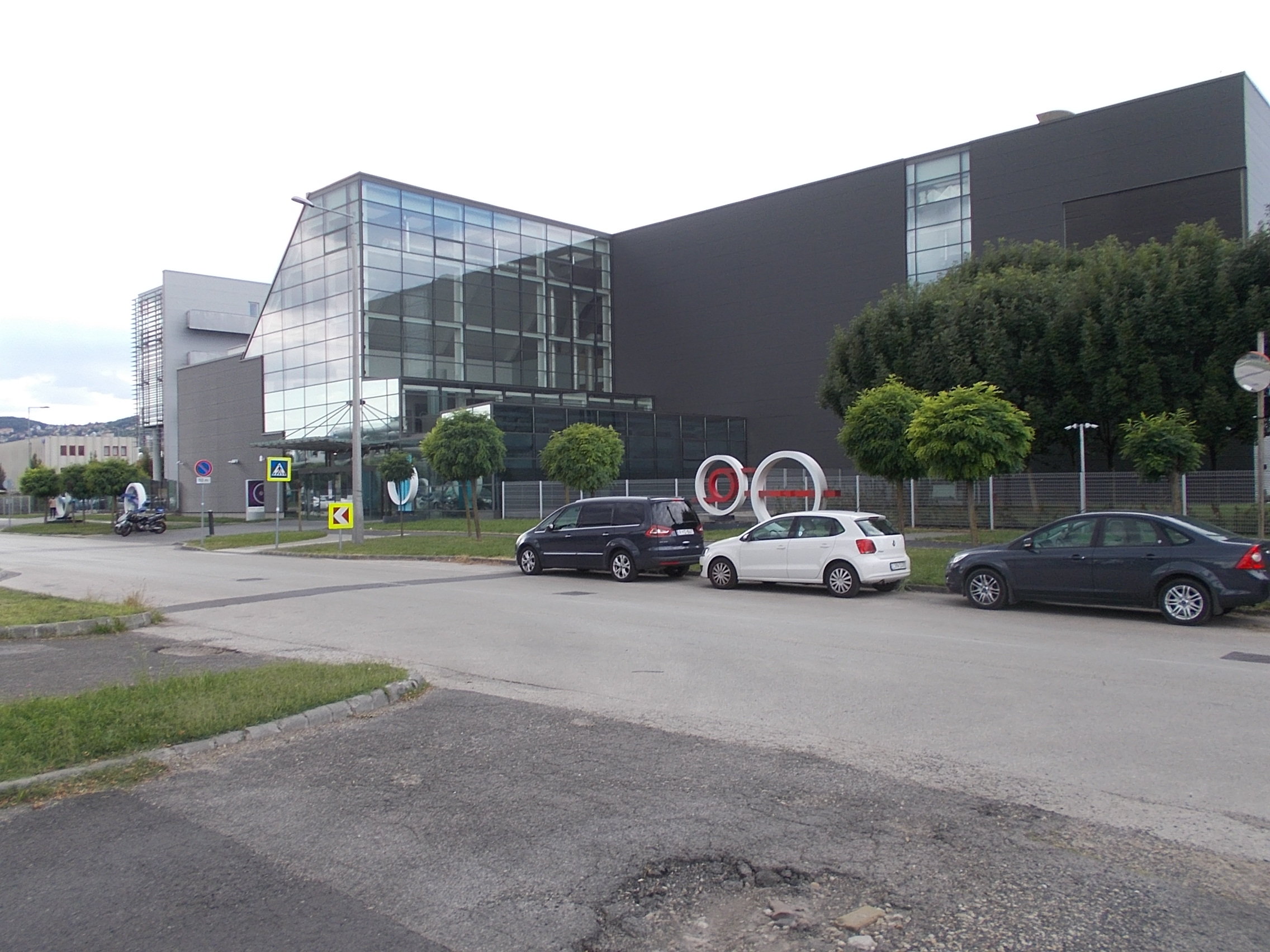
- MTVA headquarters in Budapest (2021)
- Type: State-owned corporation
- Industry: Mass media
- Predecessor: MTV; MR; Duna TV; Magyar Távirati Iroda (MTI)
- Founded: 1 January 2011; 15 years ago
- Defunct: 26 July 2026; 3 months ago
- Successor: Hungarian Radio and Television; MTI
- Headquarters: Budapest, Hungary
- Area served: Hungary
- Services: Television, radio, online
- Owner: Government of Hungary
- Website: mtva.hu

Médiaszolgáltatás-támogató és Vagyonkezelő Alap (MTVA) (lit. 'Media Services and Support Trust Fund') was a Hungarian fund company owned and financed by the Hungarian state, through the National Media and Infocommunications Authority (NMHH). MTVA was established on 1 January 2011, and from July 2015 the company's main task has been to finance and operate Duna Média, Hungary's state public company. It was an active member of the European Broadcasting Union (EBU).

MTVA dissolved on 26 July 2026 after a bill proposing the restructuring of Hungary's public service broadcasters was approved by the National Assembly of Hungary. MTVA and Duna Média were replaced by the newly established Hungarian Radio and Television (lit. 'Hungarian Radio and Television') and the reinstated Magyar Távirati Iroda (lit. 'Hungarian Telegraph Office').

== History ==
=== Background ===
MTVA brought together four public media companies in Hungary: Magyar Rádió (MR), Magyar Televízió (MTV), Duna Televízió (Duna TV) and Magyar Távirati Iroda (MTI). At the same time, MTI was given the exclusive right to produce news content for the public broadcasters. According to Hungarian politicians, the establishment of MTVA helped clean up the country's "dysfunctional public broadcasting sector". However, the media reform received criticism from foreign politicians and media experts, who believed the reform limited the independence of broadcasters and gave the government greater control over the country's public broadcasters.

The four broadcasters continued as four divisions under MTVA, but were merged into a one-joint broadcasting company named Duna Média on 1 July 2015. This nonprofit organization was the legal successor to each of the four formerly separate entities managed by the MTVA. The Duna TV channel become the main generalist channel, replacing the first Magyar Televízió channel M1, the oldest in Hungary, which changed its format/genre and assumed continuous broadcast of news related programming.

Among other things, MTVA was responsible for distributing funds and resources to the various departments in Duna Média. Most employees of Duna Média were also employed through MTVA. According to the National Assembly, MTVA aimed to have a relationship with its British counterpart, BBC.

=== Criticism ===
A 2019 report by the European Federation of Journalists stated that news coverage of the Hungarian public broadcaster was not balanced, opposition politicians' viewpoints were nearly absent from the reports, and there was a lack of transparency over the funding and work of MTVA. The report concluded that the "public service media have been deformed into state media." Moreover, MTVA withdrew its participation from the EBU's Eurovision Song Contest amid a rise in anti-LGBTQ+ sentiment among the leadership of Hungary and MTVA; while no official reason for the withdrawal was given by the broadcaster, an inside source speaking with the website Index.hu speculated that the contest was considered "too gay" for MTVA to participate.

=== Dissolution ===
Following the Tisza Party winning a landslide victory in the 2026 parliamentary election, Péter Magyar became the Prime Minister of Hungary, ending Fidesz's 16-year period under Viktor Orbán. According to a report by Reporters Without Borders, where Hungary had ranked 74th out of 180 countries in their 2026 index, MTVA had become a "propaganda machine" as a result of "political and economic manoeuvres and the buyout of media outlets by oligarchs with close ties to Fidesz", which gave Orbán's party an estimated 80% control of Hungary's entire media landscape. While prime minister-elect, Magyar criticised MTVA and its leadership. He stated that he would shut down MTVA and reform Hungary's public broadcasting system, liking it to "North Korean-style propaganda" during a live on-air interview on the channel's news programme, M1, which was also his first appearance on the national broadcaster in 18 months.

On 5 June 2026, Dániel Papp, the chief executive and director of MTVA, announced his resignation from the broadcaster, citing the government's plans to restructure the broadcaster as his reasons for leaving.

On 12 June 2026, three TISZA MPs submitted a bill to the Hungarian Parliament "on the complete transformation of public media", which would amend the Act on Media Services and Mass Communication, which passed in late 2010 to create MTVA under the Second Orbán Government. The bill reformed the structure of Hungary's public service broadcaster by replacing MTVA and Duna Média with two new organisations, which includes the creation of the Hungarian Television and Radio broadcaster (Hungarian Radio and Television), as well as the reinstatement of MTI as an independent entity.

The Independent Public Media Council was established to oversee the system and the Press Fund was set up to support independent journalism through grants. Hungarian Television and Radio had previously operated under a single institutional framework from 1957 until its dissolution in 1974, after which the radio and television broadcasters ran as independent organisations until the creation of Duna Média in June 2015.

On 23 June 2026, the bill passed with 145 votes in favour and 39 against, with new executives for both organisations set to be selected through open competitions instead of direct appointments. The amendment was enacted on 27 June.

As the successor to both MTVA and Duna Média, the new Hungarian Television and Radio broadcaster is responsible for public-service radio, television, audiovisual, digital and programme production activities. As the national news agency, MTI's role within the new public service media system includes providing news reports, written and video coverage, photographs, background materials, graphics and documentary data on domestic and international events, and operates on a separate budget structure.

== Services ==
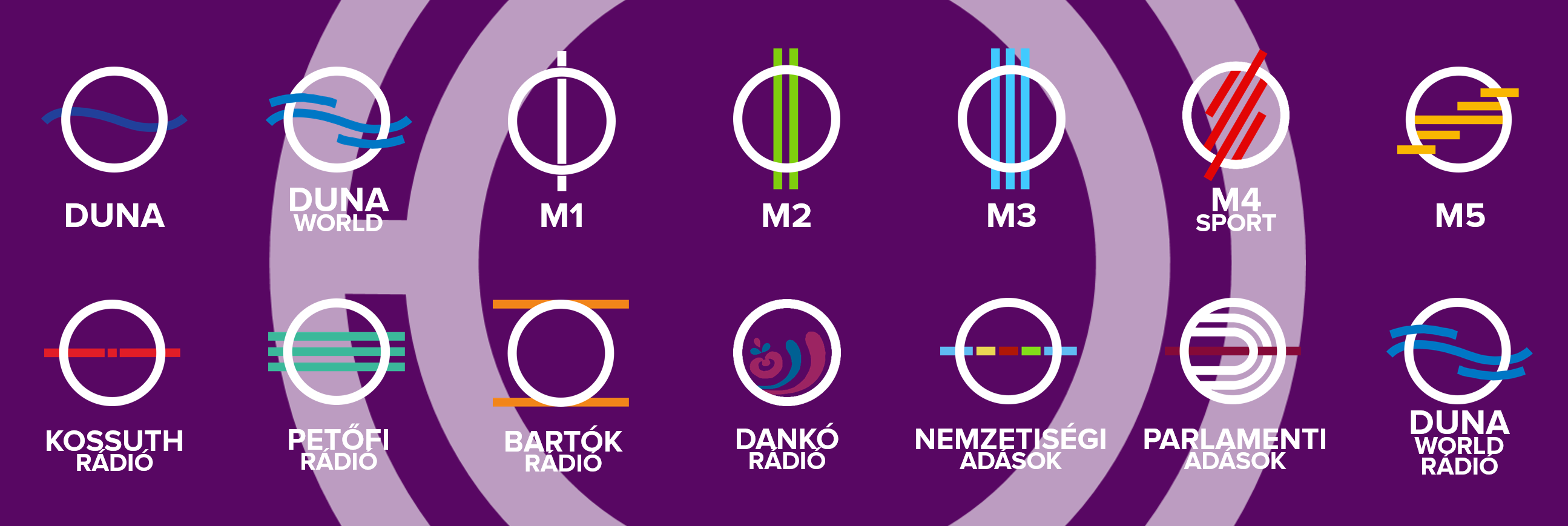
The logos of the radio and TV stations funded by MTVA (2015)

Its activities included radio, television, news agencies and online services as listed below:

=== Television ===
Name	Thematics	Launched	Timeslot
Duna	Main generalist channel	24 December 1992	0–24
Duna World	International channel for the Hungarian diaspora	16 April 2006	Weekdays 0–24; Weekends 22-14
M1	Generalist channel	1 May 1957	0−24
M2	Children channel	7 November 1973	5–22
M2 Petőfi	Youth channel	7 November 1973	22–5
M4 Sport	Sports channel	18 July 2015	0–24
M4 Sport+	Sports channel	12 September 2020	Weekends 14–22
M5	Culture and educational programming	6 August 2016	0–24

==== Defunct/planned ====
- M3: broadcasts movies and historical programs, taken from the archives of Magyar Televízió and Duna TV. As a TV channel, it closed down on 30 April 2019 and launched as an online service the following day.
- M3D: The first 3D television channel between 25 June 2012 and 13 August.
- MTVA Info: News channel about the digital television transition between 4 April 2013 and 31 January 2014.
- M4K: A channel which was announced but never launched. It would have broadcast Ultra HD programs.
- M6: A channel which was announced but never launched. The channel was planned as a regional channel of Budapest.

=== Radio ===
Name	Thematics	Launched
Kossuth Rádió	News and current affairs	1 December 1925
Petőfi Rádió	Hungarian pop music and youth programming	22 December 1934
Bartók Rádió	Classical music	1 January 1963
Nemzetiségi Rádió	Pprogrammes aimed at ethnic minorities in Hungary	1 February 2007
Parlamenti Rádió	Parliamentary broadcasts and political events	1 February 2007
Dankó Rádió	Folk, operetta and pop-folk	22 December 2012
Szakcsi Rádió	Jazz music	30 April 2024
Csukás Meserádió	Kids programmes	1 September 2024

==== Defunct ====
- Régió Rádió: Regional programs from Debrecen, Győr, Miskolc, Pécs and Szeged. The radio closed down on 22 December 2012
- Dalok és Dallamok: Folk, operetta, pop-folk. The radio closed down on 22 December 2012.
- Árvízvédelmi Rádió: Temporary radio set up due to the 2013 European floods.
- Duna World Rádió: broadcasts, news and Hungarian programs to Hungarians abroad. The radio closed down on 13 June 2024.
- Nemzeti Sportrádió: Sport programs and broadcasts. The radio closed down on 31 October 2026.

=== News agency ===
- Magyar Távirati Iroda – Hungarian state information and press agency established in 1881.

=== Internet ===
Hirado.hu logo (2016)

- Hirado.hu – A popular news portal related to the news program of the same name
- Mediaklikk.hu – Official MTVA website
- M4sport.hu – Official site of M4 Sport
- Petofilive.hu – Official site of Petőfi Rádió and M2 Petőfi
- Teletext.hu – Teletext service

== Controversies ==
In 2011, MTVA's news editor Dániel Papp manipulated a news segment about politician Daniel Cohn-Bendit to make it look like he fled the scene without an answer after being questioned on accusations of child abuse. Subsequently, uncut footage showed that Cohn-Bendit replied to the reporter's questions and denied the accusations. Papp was later promoted. In the same year, Zoltán Lomnici, the former president of the Supreme Court was blurred out from a report about a press conference he was co-hosting. The censoring of Lomnici was suggested to be politically motivated.

In 2019, a leaked audio recording made during the run-up to European Parliament elections showed a senior MTVA editor, Balázs Bende, informing reporters that the institution does not favor the opposition's list and the reporters should work accordingly. Bende instructed the reporters to produce content using the "appropriate" narrative and methodology, especially on topics like Brussels and migrants.

== See also ==
- Duna Média
- Television in Hungary
