= On the Spot =

On the Spot may refer to:

- On the Spot (2003 TV series), an American sketch comedy television series which aired during 2003 on the WB Television Network
- On the Spot (2011 TV series), an American reality/trivia television series that debuted in syndication in 2011
- On the Spot (Australian TV program), an Australian religious panel discussion television program that aired on Melbourne TV station GTV-9 from 1959 to 1960
- On the Spot (Indonesian TV program), an Indonesian news magazine show aired on Trans7. This show first aired in 2008
- On the Spot (Canadian TV series), a Canadian television series produced by the National Film Board of Canada from 1953 to 1954
- On the Spot (Philippine TV program), 2017-2023 news show
- On the Spot (Hungarian TV series), a Hungarian documentary television series
- On the Spot (UK game show), a game show in the United Kingdom, which is also in conjunction with the National Lottery
- On the Spot (U.S. game show), a locally produced game show which aired from 1984 to 1988 on KGW-TV in Portland, OR
- On the Spot (webcast), a weekly webcast hosted by GameSpot
- On the Spot (Rooster Teeth), a weekly online game show
- "On the Spot", a retired pricing game from The Price Is Right
- On the Spot, a New Zealand convenience store chain run by Foodstuffs
- On the Spot!, 1967 album by Jaki Byard
- On the Spot (play), a 1930 play by Edgar Wallace
- On the Spot (film), a 1940 American comedy film
