= Híradó =

- Genre: News program
- Country of origin: Hungary
- Original language: Hungarian

Production
- Camera setup: Multi-camera
- Running time: 20 to 30 minutes
- Production company: Hungarian Radio and Television (MRTV)

Original release
- Network: M1
- Release: 2 July 1957 – present

Híradó (Hungarian: [ˈhiːrɒdoː], or often M1 Híradó ([ˈɛmː ˈɛɟː ˈhiːrɒdoː]), News or M1 News) is the flagship television newscast produced by Hungarian state-owned public broadcaster Hungarian Radio and Television (MRTV). It is the longest running program in the history of television in Hungary as it has been broadcast daily since 2 July 1957.

Two Híradó editions a day are produced and are simulcast live (at noon and 19:30) on M1 and Duna World. Its sports news block is named TeleSport.

== History ==
Magyar Televízió (MTV) launched its daily newscast on MTV on 2 July 1957 under the title Televízió Képes Híradója first, and Keddtöl Keddig later. On 8 April 1958, it took its current title Híradó.

Before 15 March 2015, it was broadcast daily on M1 at 19:30. After that, M1 became a news channel, and Híradó was up-to-date every hour, with its main edition at 19:30 expanded to 60 minutes. The broadcasts were simulcasted on Duna TV and Duna World. On the 7 July 2026, news broadcasting was shut down due to propaganda. Test bulletins for an upcoming relaunch took place on 17 August 2026. It came back on 20 August 2026, with new presenters and a new look.

In the 2022 election, Híradó allocated 50% of politically relevant news coverage to the government and 5% to Fidesz, mostly positive in tone, while giving the opposition coalition mainly negative coverage.
