= Hungarian Radio and Television =

Hungarian public broadcasting media organisation

- Native name: Magyar Rádió és Televízió Nonprofit Zrt.
- Type: Public service broadcaster
- Industry: Mass media
- Predecessor: MTVA; Duna Média
- Founded: 21 October 2026; 32 days ago
- Headquarters: Budapest, Hungary
- Area served: Hungary
- Services: Television, radio, online
- Owner: Government of Hungary

Hungarian Radio and Television (Note: Officially known as Hungarian Radio and Television Nonprofit Ltd. (Magyar Rádió és Televízió Nonprofit Zrt.)) (Hungarian: Magyar Rádió és Televízió, abbreviated MRTV) is the new public service broadcaster of Hungary, which launched on 21 October 2026 following a bill that passed in the National Assembly on 23 June 2026.

== Background ==
Hungary's first radio broadcaster, Magyar Rádió (MR), was launched on 1 December 1925, meanwhile their first television broadcaster, Magyar Televízió (MTV), was established on 22 February 1957. In 1960, MTV was one of the four founding members of the International Radio and Television Organisation (OIRT), which was an East European network of radio and television broadcasters until it was dissolved on 1 January 1993.

Between 1957 and 1974, MR and MTV co-existed as part of the Hungarian Radio and Television (Magyar Rádió és Televízió), which coincidentally shares the same name as the broadcaster set to launch this year. However, the two broadcasters later split into independent organisations and operated separately until 2010. In 2011, MTVA was set up to finance and operate four public media companies in Hungary: Magyar Rádió (MR), Magyar Televízió (MTV), Duna Televízió (Duna TV) and Magyar Távirati Iroda (MTI). In June 2015, the Duna Media Service was established following a merger of Magyar Rádió, Magyar Televízió and Duna Televízió by the Third Orbán Government.

In 1993, MR and MTV became full members of the European Broadcasting Union (EBU), following the dissolution of OIRT. In 2011, MTVA joined the EBU taking the place of MR and MTV within the organisation after its launch the same year. In 2013, Duna TV joined as a member until the creation of Duna Média in 2015, where they joined the EBU the same year.

== History ==
Following the Tisza Party's landslide victory in the 2026 Hungarian parliamentary election, Péter Magyar became the Prime Minister of Hungary, ending Fidesz's 16-year rule under Viktor Orbán. Magyar had previously criticised MTVA and its leadership, likening it to "North Korean-style propaganda" during a live on-air interview on the channel's news programme, M1, which marked his first appearance on the national broadcaster in 18 months. He added that he would shut down MTVA and reform Hungary's public broadcasting system.

On 12 June 2026, three Tisza MPs submitted a bill to the Parliament "on the complete transformation of public media", which would amend the Act on Media Services and Mass Communication, which passed in late 2010 to create MTVA under the Second Orbán Government. The bill is set to reform the structure of Hungary's public service broadcaster by dissolving MTVA and Duna Média, and replacing them with two new organisations, which includes the creation of Hungarian Radio and Television, as well as the reinstatement of MTI as an independent entity. This would also include the setup of an Independent Public Media Council to oversee the system and a new Press Fund to support independent journalism through grants.

On 23 June 2026, the bill passed with 145 votes in favour and 39 against, with new executives for both organisations set to be selected through open competitions instead of direct appointments. The amendment was enacted on 27 June, with 90 days allotted for the establishment of the new broadcaster.

As the soon-to-be successor to both MTVA and Duna Média, the new broadcaster would be responsible for public-service radio, television, audiovisual, digital and programme production activities, with MTI taking on the responsibility of providing news reports as Hungary's national news agency, and will operate on a separate budget structure.

On 7 October 2026, two Tisza MPs submitted bills to Parliament regarding the creation of two public service companies (Magyar Rádió és Televízió, Magyar Távirati Iroda). The Independent Public Media Council announced a public competition for the position of CEO of the institution on 13 October 2026. On 3 November 2026, the National Assembly voted on the draft resolution regarding the establishment of the Hungarian Radio and Television Closed Non-Profit Corporation and the adoption of its founding charter.

== Services ==
Its activities include radio, television, news agencies and online services as listed below, which will be run by Hungarian Radio and Television after MTVA closes later this year:

=== Television ===
Name	Thematics	Launched	Timeslot
Duna	Main generalist channel	24 December 1992	0–24
Duna World	International channel for the Hungarian diaspora	16 April 2006	Weekdays 0–24; Weekends 22-14
M1	Generalist channel	1 May 1957	0−24
M2	Children channel	7 November 1973	5–22
M2 Petőfi	Youth channel	7 November 1973	22–5
M4 Sport	Sports channel	18 July 2015	0–24
M4 Sport+	Sports channel	12 September 2020	Weekends 14–22
M5	Culture and educational programming	6 August 2016	0–24

=== Radio ===
Name	Thematics	Launched
Kossuth Rádió	News and current affairs	1 December 1925
Petőfi Rádió	Hungarian pop music and youth programming	22 December 1934
Bartók Rádió	Classical music	1 January 1963
Nemzetiségi Rádió	Pprogrammes aimed at ethnic minorities in Hungary	1 February 2007
Parlamenti Rádió	Parliamentary broadcasts and political events	1 February 2007
Dankó Rádió	Folk, operetta and pop-folk	22 December 2012
Szakcsi Rádió	Jazz music	30 April 2024
Csukás Meserádió	Kids programmes	1 September 2024

=== Internet ===
- Hirado.hu – A popular news portal related to the news programme of the same name
- Mediaklikk.hu – Official website
- M4sport.hu – Official site of M4 Sport
- Petofilive.hu – Official site of Petőfi Rádió and M2 Petőfi
- Teletext.hu – Teletext service
- M3: broadcasts movies and historical programmes, taken from the archives of Magyar Televízió and Duna TV. It has operated as an online service since the TV channel closed down on 30 April 2019.
