= Trolleybuses in Debrecen =

Public transit system in Debrecen, Hungary

Debrecen trolleybus network
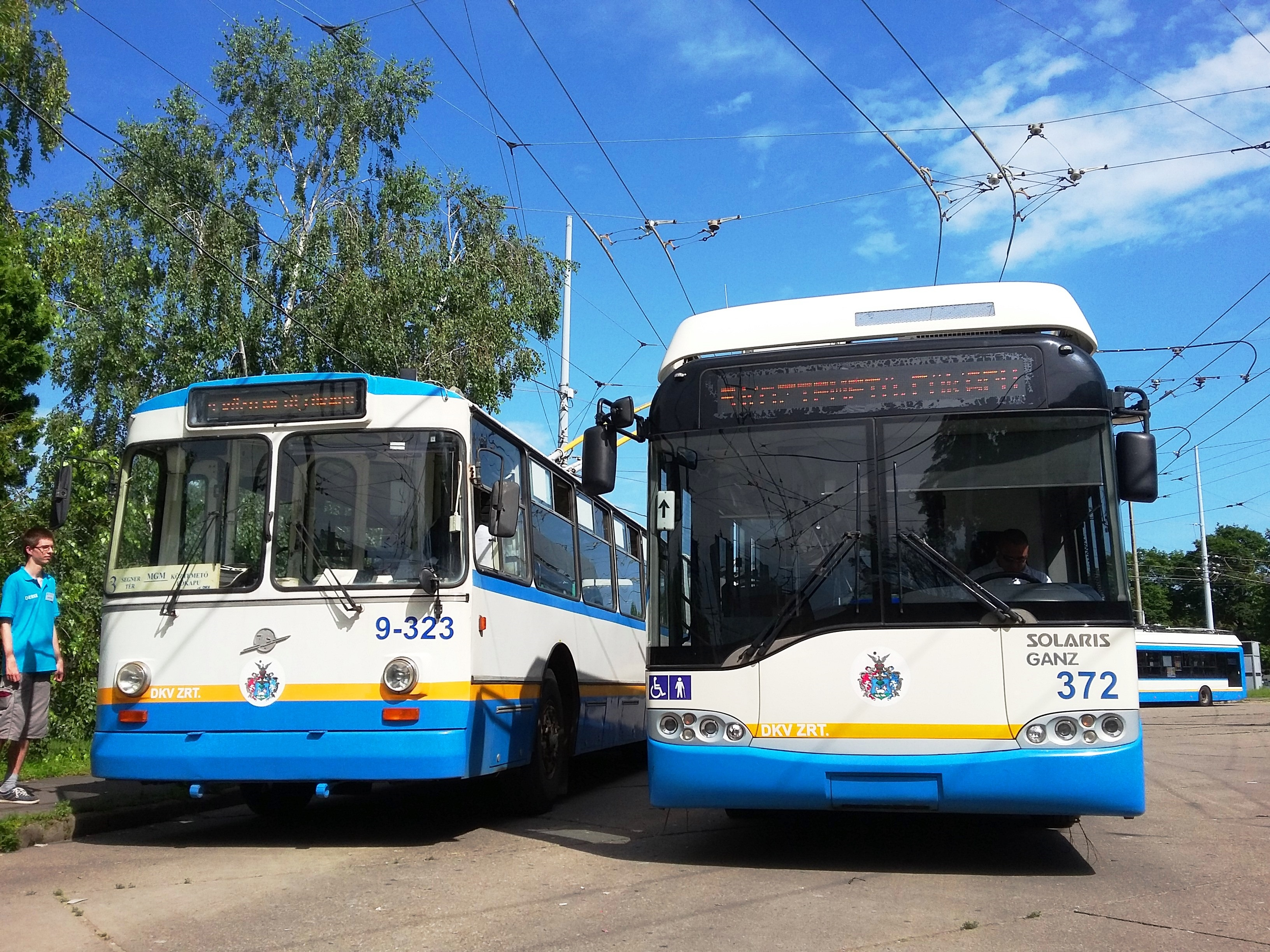
- ZiU-9 9-323 and Ganz-Solaris Trollino 12 372 at Segner square

Overview
- Owner: DKV Debreceni Közlekedési Zrt.
- Locale: Debrecen, Hajdú-Bihar, Hungary
- Transit type: Trolleybus
- Number of lines: 5 (1 suspended)
- Website: dkv.hu (in Hungarian)

Operation
- Began operation: July 2, 1985
- Operator: DKV Debreceni Közlekedési Zrt.

Technical
- System length: Line length: 10.9 km (6.8 mi)
- Electrification: 600 V DC
System map
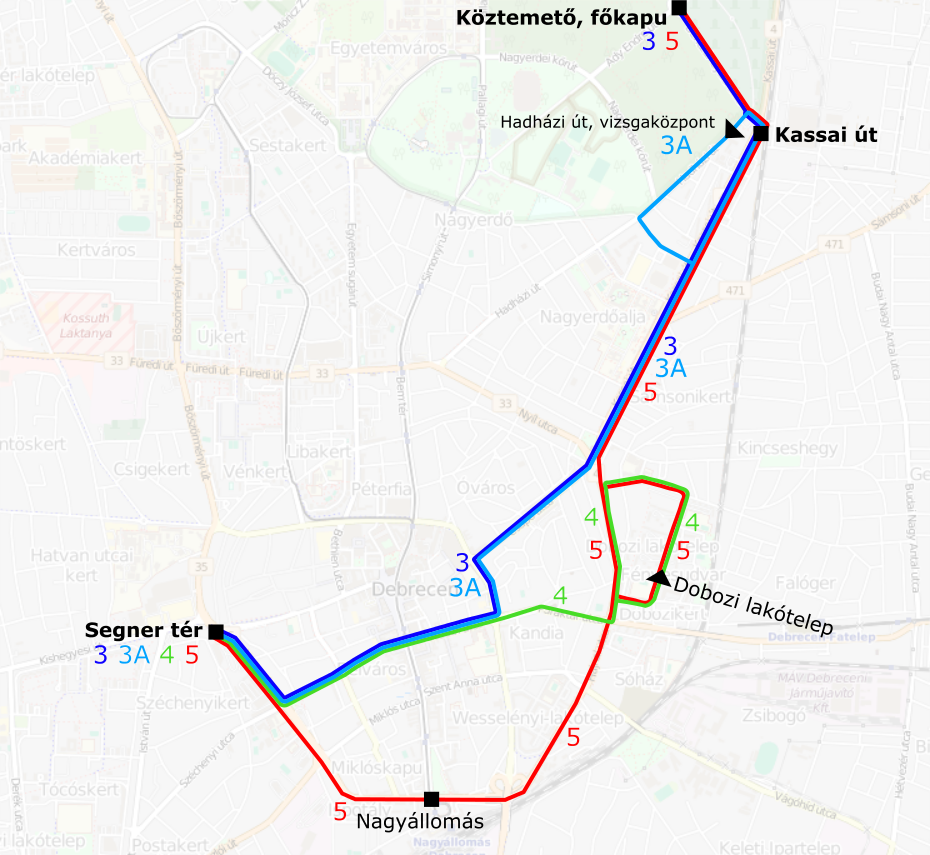

Trolleybuses in Debrecen are one of the three systems making up the public transport network serving Debrecen, Hungary. The last one of its kind opened in the country, Debrecen's trolleybus network serves the city since 1985.

== History ==
In the late 1960s, Hungary's transportation politics conception (közlekedéspolitikai koncepció) shifted from rail to rubber wheel transport, both on nationwide and urban levels. Plans were made in the early 1970s to create trolleybus lines in rural cities of Hungary, with the plans originally consisting of Szeged, Debrecen and Pécs as candidants, later switching from Pécs to Miskolc due to insufficient electric network available. Only the former two cities were able to build their trolleybus infrastructure and buy cars from the Soviet Union before the collapse of the Eastern Bloc, with Debrecen opening its first line, number 2 (numbered with the existing tram line number 1 in mind) on July 2, 1985. The sole line started from Segner square, crossed the tram line at the Great Railway Station (Nagyállomás), and traveled on the northeastern main road of the city reaching the site of the Hungarian Roll Bearing Industries (Magyar Gördülőcsapágy Művek, MGM).

After a year in service in 1986, the network expanded two stops from the MGM to the main gate of the Public Cemetery (Köztemető), and a year later with line number 3, that shared the exact same end stations as its original counterpart, but instead of the outer ring of the city, the line crossed through the inner city to reach its destination.

In the 1990s, the new city leadership planned to create an east–west corridor connecting two of the largest housing estates in the city, Tócóskert and Dobozi housing estates (Dobozi lakótelep). The latter on the eastern outskirts of the city was connected to line 3's existing infrastructure, and in 1995, the new line 4A started to operate, with the A sign indicating that it's not the full planned length of the line. Although pole-laying operations started at Tócóskert as well, the quickly draining financial situation of the city made the construction works impossible to finish. In 2000, the line 4A was suspended in favor of bus operator Hajdú Volán's new methane fueled green buses, and traffic on it was restored in 2010 only (as line number 4), a year after Hajdú Volán lost its position as Debrecen's local bus operator.

In 2005, the city of Debrecen bought new Ganz-Solaris Trollino 12 trolleybuses, with 5 of them (later expanded to 16) being capable of moving without cables as diesel powering was fitted in them. This meant that DKV could create lines that reach outside the infrastructural boundaries. Line 3E was created as Hungary's first trolleybus line with cableless sections, that reached out to the university instead of the cemetery.

The 2010s came with little impact on the trolleybus network. In 2011, line 3E was abandoned, and a new line (numbered 3A) opened on a shorter cableless section on Hadházi way (this line is suspended since the 2022 energy price hikes). In 2014, the opening of the tram line number 2 meant that the original trolley line number 2 and 2A was renumbered to 5 and 5A respectively.

== Current lines ==
Line	Start	Through	End	Length	Stops	Hours of service Weekdays	Rolling stock
3	Segner tér	Nyugati utca - Széchenyi utca - Kossuth utca - Burgundia utca - Csapó utca - Kassai út - Benczúr utca	Köztemető, főkapu	5.6 km	15	04:20 - 23:00	Ganz-Solaris Trollino 12
3A (suspended)	Segner tér	Nyugati utca - Széchenyi utca - Kossuth utca - Burgundia utca - Csapó utca - Kassai út - Hadházi út - Zákány utca	Hadházi út, vizsgaközpont (loop)	6.3 km	17	Service suspended since 2022	Ganz-Solaris Trollino 12 (with diesel power unit only)
4	Segner tér	Nyugati utca - Széchenyi utca - Kossuth utca - Faraktár utca - Munkácsy utca - Víztorony utca - Ótemető utca	Dobozi lakótelep (loop)	4.1 km	11	04:33 - 23:00 (weekdays only)	Ganz-Solaris Trollino 12, Ikarus 280T (heritage rides only)
5	Segner tér	Nyugati utca - Erzsébet utca - Wesselényi utca - Víztorony utca (onwards) / Rakovszky utca (backwards) - Kassai út - Benczúr utca	Köztemető, főkapu	4.1 km	18	06:30 - 18:00	Ganz-Solaris Trollino 12
5A	Segner tér	Nyugati utca - Erzsébet utca - Wesselényi utca - Víztorony utca (onwards) / Rakovszky utca (backwards) - Kassai út	Kassai út	7.3 km	16	04:05 - 06:40; 17:12 - 23:00	Ganz-Solaris Trollino 12

== Fleet ==
Image	Trolleybus type or subtype	Number of cars		Fleet number	Constructed	Presence in Debrecen
Image	Trolleybus type or subtype	Current	Original	Fleet number	Constructed	Presence in Debrecen
Current fleet
	Ganz-Solaris Trollino 12	5		341-345	2005	
	Ganz-Solaris Trollino 12D	5		371-375	2005	
	Ganz-Škoda Solaris Trollino 12D-2	11		376-386	2007	
	MAZ 103T	1		346; After years of storage on Salétrom street, the sole MAZ car was refurbished in 2025 by DKV workers, initially as part of the heritage fleet, bearing an outside decoration stylized after popular 1970s Hungarian puppet tale series Mazsola és Tádé, branded MAZsola; as of 2026, the decoration is no longer fitted and car no. 346 is part of the active daily fleet	2007	
Heritage fleet
	Ikarus 280T	1	5	No. 402 remains in active fleet, occasional heritage rides available on specified 'retro days'; occasional de-icing duties in winter	1980-1991	1991-
	ZiU-9	3	37	Three cars remain at the DKV base on Salétrom street; none operational as of September 2026	1976-1988	1985-
