= Nemzeti Sport =

Hungarian sports newspaper

- Owner: MTVA
- Editor-in-chief: György Szöllősi
- Founded: 1903
- Language: Hungarian
- Country: Hungary
- Circulation: 14,700 (2024)
- Website: nemzetisport.hu

Nemzeti Sport (Hungarian pronunciation: [ˈnɛmzɛti ˈʃport], lit. 'National Sport') is a Hungarian daily sports newspaper.

== History and profile ==
Nemzeti Sport was founded in 1903. It is frequently cited by quality English-language media. The paper is published in broadsheet format.

Between the World War I and World War II, Gyula Vadas, István Pluhár, and Mihály Mamusich worked for the newspaper.

Its publisher claimed that the newspaper had the third largest circulation in the country. The circulation of the paper was 96,000 copies in 2003. It had a circulation of 95,111 copies in 2009, making it the fourth most read daily in the country. The circulation decreased to 18,212 by 2022.

At the end of April 2024, the group was acquired by MTVA. From this event came the takeover of Sportrádió to create Nemzeti Sportrádió. On 6 July 2026, Network4 announced its intention to acquire the group.
