= Parlamenti Rádió =

Hungarian radio station

- Budapest; Hungary
- Broadcast area: Central Europe

Programming
- Language: Hungarian
- Format: Parliamentary proceedings
- Affiliations: EBU

Ownership
- Owner: Hungarian Radio and Television

History
- Founded: 2007
- First air date: 1 February 2007
- Former names: MR5-Parlamenti adások (2007–2012); Parlamenti adások (2012–2016)

Links
- Website: Official website

Parlamenti Rádió, formerly known as Parlamenti Adások (Parliamentary Broadcasts) is a public-broadcasting radio station in Hungary, owned by Hungarian Radio and Television, which broadcasts parliamentary sessions. The station was created following the 2007 restructuring of Magyar Rádió and the withdrawal of parliamentary broadcasts from Kossuth Rádió.

In the third quarter of 2025, it was the MTVA station with the smallest reach, with an estimated 7,000 listeners. However, given its nature as a public service station, its ratings are not measured in NMHH rankings.

== History ==
Until 1 February 2007, all parliamentary broadcasts were on Kossuth Rádió. In late 2005, MR planned the discontinuation of such proceedings eyeing the shutdown of the old OIRT FM frequencies on 1 February 2006, where a separate version of Kossuth aired with such broadcasts. With the shutdown, it planned to transfer the broadcasts to Bartók Rádió from that date, but this move was seen with harsh criticism from station staff, as the editorial team did not want to have the name associated to politics, and that it would cause a negative impact on its 2006 schedule, which celebrated the 125th anniversary of the birth of Béla Bartók, its namesake.

On 1 February 2007, MR5-Parlamenti adások started broadcasting as a digital-only radio station, available for listening on its official website. During parliamentary breaks, the station initially relayed MR1-Kossuth, and later broadcast jazz music.

== Reception ==
The station is available online (at MRTV-owned websites) and on the Eutelsat 9B satellite across Europe.
