= György Szepesi =

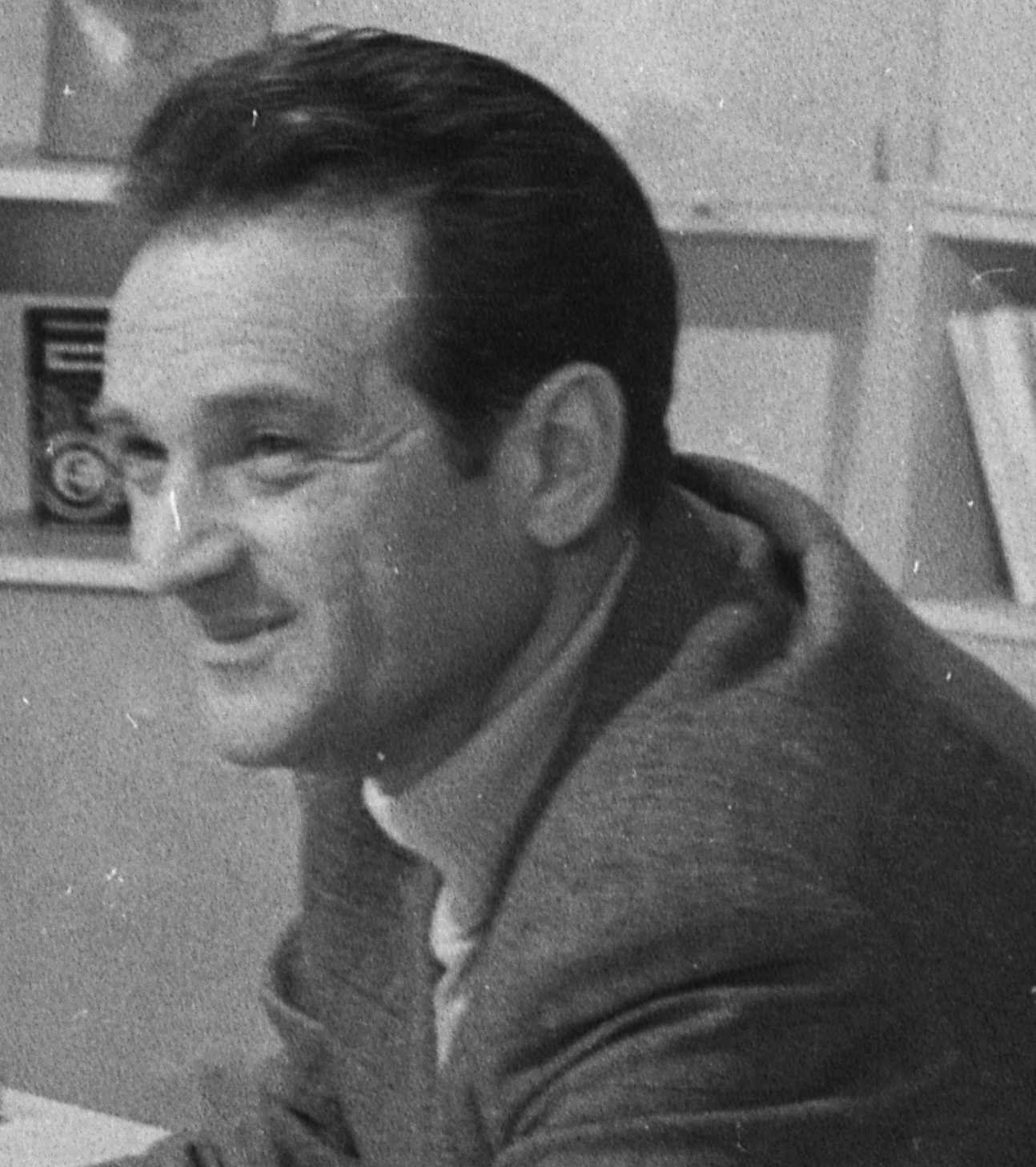
- Szepesi in 1970
- Born: György Friedländer; 5 February 1922; Budapest, Kingdom of Hungary
- Died: 25 July 2018 (aged 96); Budapest, Hungary
- Education: University of Physical Education, Budapest
- Occupations: Radio personality, journalist, and sports executive

György Szepesi (né Friedländer; 5 February 1922 – 25 July 2018) was a Hungarian radio personality, journalist and sports executive. In 2006, Szepesi earned the record for the longest career as a sports commentator.

== Early life ==
Szepesi was born György Friedländer into a Jewish family in Budapest, Hungary. He played basketball for Hungary's Vác-Újbuda LTC until 1942. His father, Miklós Friedländer, died in the Buchenwald concentration camp in 1945. Szepesi himself was forced into a labour battalion in Ukraine, which was disbanded in October 1944. Szepesi then returned to Budapest and lived with Gábor Kocsis, a fellow battalion survivor, Kocsis' wife, and their four children, until mid-January 1945, when the German troops retreated from Hungary. Szepesi received his doctorate in sports history from the University of Physical Education in Budapest.

== Career ==
Szepesi began on Hungarian Radio in April 1945. He covered the Olympic Games from 1948, and the Football World Cup from 1954. Szepesi was a Hungarian Olympic Committee member from 1962 to 2000, and was the Executive Committee Chairman for the Fédération Internationale de Football Association (FIFA) from 1982 to 1994. He was Chairman of the Hungarian Football Association (HFA) from 1978 to 1986. He was the honorary chairman of the HFA, and an honorary member of FIFA's Executive Committee.

== Written works ==
- (with László Lukacs) The match of the century, Hungarian News and Information Service, 1953 OCLC 943101461
- Népesedésünk ma és holnap, Kossuth, 1986, ISBN 963-09-2840-X
- Hungarian football rhapsody: 70 years of soccer history, Pannonia Press, 1968 OCLC 937175955

== Death and legacy ==
Szepesi received the FIFA Medal in 1994, and the Olympic Order from the International Olympic Committee in 1995. He received the Pillar of Achievement Award from the International Jewish Sports Hall of Fame in 1997. In 2004, Szepesi was given the Prima Primissa Award in the Hungarian Electronic Press category. In 2005, Szepesi became an honorary citizen of Budapest. That same year, he was decorated with the Middle Cross of the Order of Merit of the Republic of Hungary.

In 2015, The Szepesi Prize was created to recognize other significant figures in Hungarian and sports journalism. He died on 25 July 2018 in Budapest at the age of 96.
