= On the Spot (Hungarian TV series) =

- Genre: Documentary
- Created by: Eszter Cseke & Andras S. Takacs
- Country of origin: Hungary

Production
- Running time: 52 mins
- Production company: Spot Productions

Original release
- Release: November 7, 2009 – present

On The Spot is a documentary TV series created by directors Eszter Cseke and Andras S. Takacs in their native Hungary. Each season has a central theme (ethnic tribes, children of dictators, birth around the world, etc.), using a fly on the wall style of documentary filmmaking. It premiered November 7, 2009, on Spektrum TV. It currently airs on Hungarian public television channels Duna and Duna World. Many of On the Spot's films are also shown across several European countries on special interest channels such as Spiegel TV and Sport 1 (subsidiaries of Liberty Global, Autentic and AMC Networks International), as well as Germany's international broadcaster Deutsche Welle. On the Spot’s most personal season explored giving birth in different cultures. ‘Around the World in 9 Months’ was produced in 10 countries from Bali to Mexico, which gave the creators a rarely wide spectrum on the topic of birth while they were expecting their own baby who was born at the end of the last episode. Eszter Cseke and Andras S. Takacs' next season introduced Children of Dictators to their audience, including Edith Eva Eger and Dr. Gabor Mate. Smart World, the 9th season of On the Spot discovers the effects of mobile coverage, wifi and smartphones of human communities from New York to Transylvania. Episodes of On the Spot appeared in the official selection of festivals like the Krakow International Film Festival, the American Documentary Film Festival, INPUT or the Sarajevo International Film Festival. Spot's approach has been called “rare and exclusive” by the BBC while the Financial Times wrote ‘On The Spot’ is “up-close and visceral”, adding that “Takacs and Cseke plunge their cameras into the heart of the action, asking questions that are normally suppressed". In 2021 the award winning film directors newest documentary film was aired by ARTE and Spektrum TV. This is the story of a Jewish baby who was born in the death camp before the liberation and survived. An extraordinary journey of the second and third generation, breaking the cycle of trauma to free themselves from Auschwitz - forever.

The series takes its inspiration from famed Hungarian war correspondent Robert Capa who wrote, “If your pictures aren't good enough, you're not close enough.”

== Synopsis ==
With just two small broadcast cameras and no extra crew, Cseke and Takacs serve as directors, producers, and cinematographers. Working in this capacity, they document the lives of people across the world in a range of environments. Each season covers a distinct topic, such as living with ethnic tribes in Africa and Papua, being embedded with fighters in the Middle East, or spending time with Fidel Castro's daughter Alina or Idi Amin's son Jaffar for coverage about children of dictators.

== Starting out ==
After graduating from the Hungarian Film Academy in Budapest, Cseke and Takacs put together their meager savings and went to Gaza with just a small camera and the drive to make an upstart documentary TV series. Three months later they were pitching the pilot episode to major TV channels in Hungary but no one thought it was commercial enough. Their gamble finally paid off when Spektrum TV - a small Central European cable channel searching for its first original programming - picked up the series and commissioned the first season.

== Production ==
On The Spot's first three seasons were characterised by human interest stories around the world. Cseke and Takacs filmed in the ghettos of Johannesburg, searching out human rights activists in Kabul and found underground bloggers in Tehran. They interviewed UN Secretary General Ban Ki-moon in the Arctic Circle and were interviewed live on the BBC about their undercover filming in Burma. Years later they followed up their award-winning coverage on Burma by interviewing Aung San Suu Kyi about fear, freedom and the nature of dictatorships.

At the end of 2011, On The Spot transitioned from Spektrum TV to Hungarian public television channels Duna and Duna World. The series' topics went on to include ethnic tribes in Africa, power struggles in places like Tibet, India and the West Bank, children of dictators and most recently giving birth in different cultures around the globe.

Cseke and Takacs are also frequent contributors to Marie Claire and Forbes, using their travels and experiences as a backdrop for their articles.

== Reception ==
The series has garnered a great deal of international recognition and critical acclaim. It received the Golden Nymph for Best News Documentary at the 53rd Monte Carlo TV Festival, the Press Freedom Award in Strasbourg from the Council of Europe, the Prize for Best International Short Film at the American Documentary Film Festival and the Gold Plaque at the 50th Chicago International Film Festival Television Awards.

The Financial Times wrote On The Spot is “up-close and visceral”, adding that “Takacs and Cseke plunge their cameras into the heart of the action, asking questions that are normally suppressed." BBC News called their different approach "rare and exclusive." In 2016, Takacs was included in Forbes’ '30 Under 30' list as one of the leading young entrepreneurs in European media.
