= Tade (name) =

Tade or Tadé may refer to the following people

== Given name ==
- Tadeusz Fuss-Kaden (1914–1985), Polish painter
- Tade Adepoyibi, Australian actress
- Tade Ipadeola (born 1970), Nigerian poet
- Tade Ogidan (born 1960), Nigerian film and television screenwriter, producer and director
- Tade Thompson, British-born Nigerian psychiatrist and science fiction writer

== Surname ==
- Clarence Tade (1883–1961), Canadian politician
- Emiliano Tade (born 1988), Argentinean football player
- Grégory Tadé (born 1986), French football player
- Marco Tadé (born 1995), Swiss skier
