= Nemzeti Sportrádió =

Hungarian national radio station

- Budapest; Hungary
- Broadcast area: Central Europe
- Frequency: 105.9 MHz (FM) in Budapest

Programming
- Language: Hungarian
- Format: Sports
- Affiliations: EBU

Ownership
- Owner: Hungarian Radio and Television

History
- Founded: 2024
- First air date: 14 June 2024; 2 years ago
- Last air date: 31 October 2026

Technical information
- Repeater: 1 FM transmitter (Budapest only)

Links
- Website: Official website

Nemzeti Sportrádió (National Sports Radio) was a public broadcasting radio station in Hungary, owned and operated by Hungarian Radio and Television. It was founded in 2024 after MTVA took over the frequency of the former privately-owned Sportrádió. FM broadcasts were limited to Budapest.

== History ==
Nemzeti Sportrádió was created following the April 2024 acquisition of Nemzeti Sport, content partner of Sportrádió, a private sports radio station, by MTVA. The company was operating at a loss and forcibly ended its ten-year contract with the private company to exploit the radio station at its own request; consequently the possibility of aligning it with MTVA's sports channel M4 emerged. The tentative brand name M4 Sportrádió was registered at the Hungarian Patent Office in late May, as well as associated domain names. On 29 May, it was announced that the station would be branded as Nemzeti Sportrádió instead.

The station started broadcasting on 14 June 2024 as the first (and only) sports radio station owned by a public broadcaster in Central Europe, with the presence of Viktor Orbán; eyeing both UEFA Euro 2024 and the 2024 Summer Olympics. In addition to popular sports such as football, it announced that it would give airtime to other competitive sports, Paralympic sports and youth matches. Its launch came at the cost of closing Duna World Radio, MTVA's external radio service. Swimmer Éva Risztov, who since launch was a presenter at Nemzeti Sportrádió, left in February 2026 to join private station Retro Rádió.

In October 2026, it was reported that Nemzeti Sportrádió would permanently cease broadcasting on 31 October 2026 due to the reorganization of the public media system.
