= Duna Média =

Hungarian public broadcaster

Duna Médiaszolgáltató
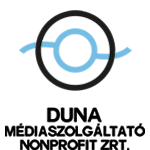
- Type: Public broadcasting
- Country: Hungary
- Availability: National; International
- Headquarters: Óbuda-Békásmegyer, Budapest
- Owner: Közszolgálati Közalapítvány
- Key people: P. András Horváth, CEO
- Launch date: 1 July 2015; 11 years ago
- Dissolved: 21 October 2026; 16 days ago
- Official website: dunamsz.hu
- Replaced: MTV; MR; Duna TV; MTI
- Replaced by: MRTV

Duna Media Service Provider (Hungarian: Duna Médiaszolgáltató), also known as Duna Média, was Hungary's only public service broadcaster for radio, television and new media between July 2015 and October 2026. The company operated six TV channels, seven radio stations, a news agency, and online services.

Duna Média was created through the merger of Magyar Rádió, Magyar Televízió and Duna Televízió by the Third Orbán Government. The reasons given were the elimination of duplicate structures in the public media and coordination by a central administration under the government.

Following the approval by the National Assembly on 23 June 2026 of a bill restructuring Hungary's public service media, the organization Médiaszolgáltatás-támogató és Vagyonkezelő Alap (MTVA) officially ceased operations after being merged into Duna Média. Its activities and functions were transferred to the merged organization, which will continue to operate on a transitional basis until the effective establishment of the newly public broadcaster Hungarian Radio and Television (Magyar Rádió és Televízió) and the reinstated Magyar Távirati Iroda (Hungarian Telegraph Office).

== History ==
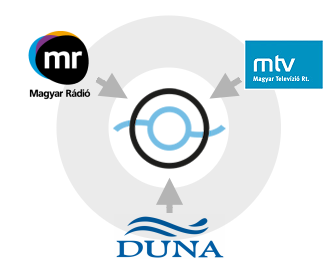
Merger of the three major Hungarian broadcasting companies.

Duna Media is the result of a merger between the former public service broadcasters Magyar Televízió (MTV), Magyar Rádió (MR) and Duna TV, as well as the Hungarian news agency Magyar Távirati Iroda (MTI). This nonprofit organization is the legal successor to each of the four formerly separate entities managed by Médiaszolgáltatás-támogató és Vagyonkezelő Alap (MTVA).

Duna Media is a member of the European Broadcasting Union (EBU) and is funded by MTVA.

As of 1 January 2023, the organisational structure has changed significantly. Instead of the previous four directorates, only two will be responsible for content. The former Directorates have been reorganised under the new Content Directorate. The other new Directorate is the Content Development Directorate, which will have a small creative team. Additionally, there is the Strategy Office, which, until now, was the "creative manager". Both directorates are headed by external managers, the former being Zoltán István Tóth, a former member of the Television Jury of the National Film Institute and 777blog.hu, a blog committed to Christian values (he used to head the Country Image Centre and worked at Hír TV and MTVA); the latter is Róbert Kárász, who has been a presenter at ATV since 2017 (he used to work at TV2 and RTL).

=== Dissolution ===
On 12 June 2026, three TISZA MPs submitted a bill to the Hungarian Parliament "on the complete transformation of public media", which would amend the Act on Media Services and Mass Communication, which passed in late 2010 to create MTVA under the Second Orbán Government. The bill reformed the structure of Hungary's public service broadcaster by replacing MTVA and Duna Média with two new organisations, which includes the creation of the Hungarian Radio and Television broadcaster (Magyar Rádió és Televízió), as well as the reinstatement of MTI as an independent entity.

On 23 June 2026, the bill passed with 145 votes in favour and 39 against, with new executives for both organisations set to be selected through open competitions instead of direct appointments. The amendment was enacted on 27 June.

== See also ==
- Mass media in Hungary
