= Tade Adepoyibi =

Australian actress of African origin

Tade Adepoyibi is an Australian actress of African origin. She played Frances Elaine Newton in the USA television series Deadly Women.

== Filmography ==
List of acting performances in film and television
Year	Title	Role	Note
2010	Ben Hur: The Hollywood Legend Comes Alive	Pirate Neonema	Film
2011	Christmas Reeve	Jessica Blue	Short-film
2011–2012	Deadly Women	Frances Elaine Newton / Shanee Gaines	TV series (3 episodes)
2013	Rise of the Underdog	Trish Billet	Short-film
2013	Wonderland	African Student	TV series (1 episode)
2014	C.A.K.E. The Series	Toya	TV series (1 episode)
2014	Re-Casting Kyle	Kamilah Auditioner	TV series (1 episodes)
2015	Rise	Trish Billet	Film (completed)
