= Duna (TV channel) =

Hungarian television channel

Duna TV
- Country: Hungary
- Broadcast area: Hungary, satellite: Europe, North America, South America, Australia, New Zealand, North Africa, Middle East and cable networks of border countries
- Headquarters: Budapest, Kunigunda útja 64.

Programming
- Picture format: 576i (SDTV 16:9); 1080i (HDTV)

Ownership
- Owner: Hungarian Radio and Television
- Sister channels: Duna World; M1; M2; M2 Petőfi; M4 Sport; M4 Sport +; M5

History
- Launched: 24 December 1992; 33 years ago

Links
- Website: www.mediaklikk.hu/duna

Duna TV, full name Duna Televízió (Hungarian pronunciation: [ˈdunɒ ˈtɛlɛviːzioː])— is one of Hungary's public television channels. "Duna" is the Hungarian name for the Danube. Duna has been the national main channel of the public media since 15 March 2015.

Duna TV was managed and primarily funded by the Media Service Support and Asset Management Fund (Hungarian: Médiaszolgáltatás-támogató és Vagyonkezelő Alap, abbreviated MTVA). This government organisation, formed in 2011, also managed the public service broadcasters Magyar Televízió and Magyar Rádió as well as the Hungarian news agency Magyar Távirati Iroda.

On 1 July 2015, Duna TV as well as the media channels of three other public media organizations managed by the MTVA were merged into a single organization called Duna Media Service (Hungarian: Duna Médiaszolgáltató). This organization is the legal successor to Duna TV and is an active member of the European Broadcasting Union.

== History ==
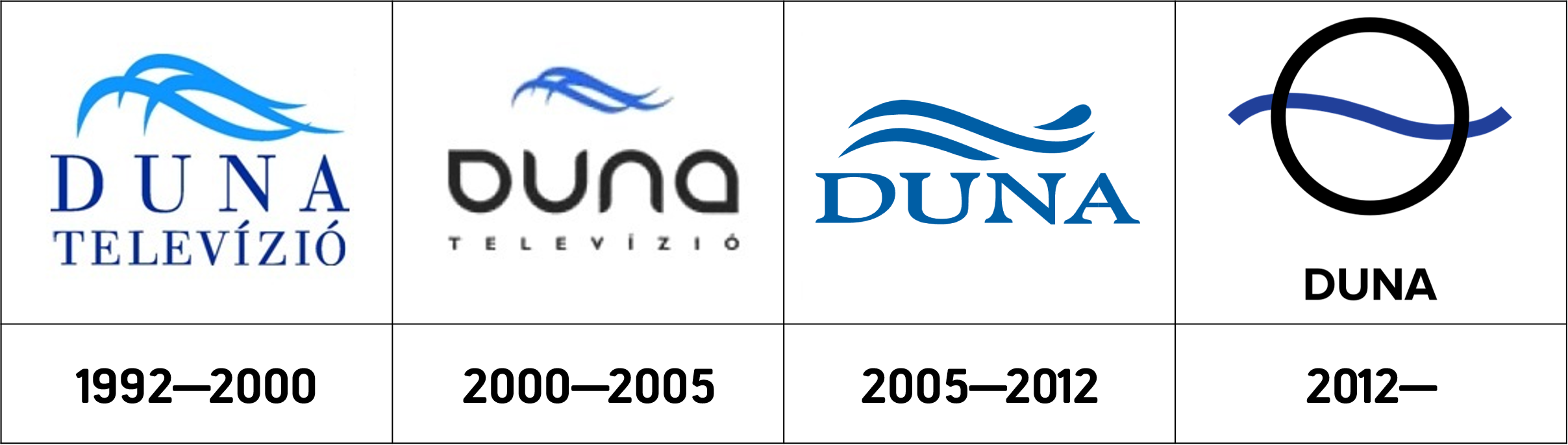
The logos used by Duna since 1992.

Duna TV went on the air in December 1992 as the first Hungarian TV station to broadcast over satellite. Its mission is to create and broadcast programming for and news about Hungarian minority communities beyond Hungary's borders in order to help maintain their national/ethnic identity.

In 1993, it received an injection worth the equivalent of US$28 million from the Hungarian government and a change in executives.

A few years later, Duna TV became the first Hungarian station to broadcast 24 hours a day. In 2004, Duna TV began to broadcast in North America, South America and Australia. In 2006, Duna TV started its Channel II (Autonomy TV, today Duna World).

Duna TV had been originally funded from a television licence fee imposed on owners of television sets. However, in July 2002, the government abolished the fee and began to partially fund the broadcaster through direct payments, with additional funding coming from advertising and commercial activities.

In 2010, after Magyar Televízió withdrew from the Eurovision Song Contest that year due to financial reasons, Duna TV attempted to move from an approved participant to an active member of the European Broadcasting Union in order to continue Hungary's participation in the event. While a decision ultimately was not made in time for Duna TV to participate, Duna TV did air the 2010 contest. Magyar Televízió returned for the 2011 contest.

In 2011, most of the assets and employees of Duna TV were made a part of the newly created Media Service Support and Asset Management Fund (Hungarian: Médiaszolgáltatás-támogató és Vagyonkezelő Alap, abbreviated MTVA), a government organization controlled by the Media Council of Hungary. Magyar Televízió and Magyar Rádió were also made a part of MTVA, unifying all three public service broadcasters in Hungary for the first time. Additionally, the Hungarian news agency Magyar Távirati Iroda was merged into the MTVA and has since been responsible for the production of all news content aired on the three broadcasting organizations.

Duna TV's membership in the European Broadcasting Union (EBU) was elevated from approved participant to active status in 2014 following the establishment of an agreement between the EBU, Hungarian public service broadcasters, and MTVA that enabled the EBU to treat Duna TV, Magyar Televízió, and Magyar Rádió as a single unit for membership purposes.

As part of its overhaul revamp for all of its MTVA channels in 2015, Duna began broadcasting all of its entertainment and current affairs content from M1, starting with the Eurovision Song Contest, but they retain its original structure as they continue to serve the Hungarian minorities.

Another consequence of the 2015 MTVA revamp of public media services in Hungary saw Duna TV merged with Magyar Televízió, Magyar Rádió, and Magyar Távirati Iroda to create a single organization called Duna Media Service (Hungarian: Duna Médiaszolgáltató). This nonprofit organization is the legal successor to each of the four formerly separate entities managed by the MTVA.

On 22 January 2022, as part of the day of the Hungarian Culture, Duna got rebranded for the first time in a decade, with new idents and shows, and also revamped their other shows along with that. The channel also brought back the slogan from 2005-2012 called "A nemzet televíziója" which means "The television of the nation".

== Regional studios ==
The station is broadcast from Budapest, but has regional studios in Cluj-Napoca (Kolozsvár), București (Bucharest) Târgu Mureș (Marosvásárhely), and Odorheiu Secuiesc (Székelyudvarhely) in Romania; Bratislava (Pozsony) in Slovakia; Subotica (Szabadka) in Serbia; Uzhhorod (Ungvár) in Ukraine, and other places.

== Notable anchors ==
- Éva Ciprusz
- Georgina Szántó
- Gábor Báthory
- Bea Lukács
- Miklós Borsa
