= Bartók Rádió =

Hungarian national radio station

- Budapest; Hungary
- Broadcast area: Central Europe
- Frequency: 105.3 MHz (FM) in Budapest

Programming
- Language: Hungarian
- Format: Classical, jazz, literature
- Affiliations: EBU

Ownership
- Owner: Hungarian Radio and Television

History
- First air date: March 1957; 69 years ago
- Former names: MR3-Bartók Rádió (2007–2012)

Technical information
- Repeater: 16 FM transmitters

Links
- Website: Official website

Bartók Rádió (formerly known as MR3-Bartók Rádió) is a public-broadcasting radio station in Hungary, airing classical music, jazz and literary programs. It is one of the seven national radio channels owned and operated by Hungarian Radio and Television, and was founded in 1957 as an FM test service, before commencing regular broadcasts in 1973. Its namesake is Béla Bartók.

As of 2021, the station had a market share of 1.6%.

== History ==
Magyar Rádió started conducting FM test transmissions in March 1957, later using the OIRT band (discontinued in 2007) and began full broadcasts in 1973. From May 1987, the station adopted the name Bartók.

Its team, as well as descendants of Béla Bartók, rejected a December 2005 plan to move all parliamentary broadcasts to the station, as they feared that the name could be associated with politics. This came with the shutdown of the old OIRT FM band, originally scheduled for 1 February 2006, which implied the shutdown of the separate FM feed of Kossuth Rádió with parliamentary broadcasts. For 2006, the station planned to observe Bartók's 125th anniversary with a series of special programs. If the parliamentary proceedings moved to the station, Bartók's descendants would revoke the usage of the name, which they thought could be used for "ignoble political battles".

On 16 August 2007, the station was renamed MR3-Bartók and adopted orange as its color. The numeral 3 was accompanied by a musical partiture. The goal of the rebrand was to popularize classical music among its listeners.

In April 2019, Bartók Rádió introduced a new studio, shared with Dankó Rádió. With the suspension of the news department as part of MTVA's restructuring on 7 July 2026, its programming was heard on Kossuth Rádió's transmitter network.

== See also ==
- Magyar Rádió
- Eastern Bloc information dissemination
