= Mazsola és Tádé =

- Written by: Ágnes Bálint
- Directed by: Márta Kende; József Simándi
- Voices of: Gertrúd Havas; István Bölöni Kiss; Hédi Váradi
- Country of origin: Hungary
- Original language: Hungarian
- No. of seasons: 3
- No. of episodes: 23

Production
- Cinematography: Antal Abonyi; Sándor Dobay
- Editors: Erzsébet Bessenyei; Katalin Ilosvay
- Running time: 11 minutes per episode
- Production company: Magyar Televízió

Original release
- Network: M1; M2
- Release: 1969

Mazsola és Tádé (lit. Mazsola and Tádé) is a Hungarian puppet animated children TV series produced between 1969 and 1973. The audience targeted was mainly young children.

The characters were originally created by the Hungarian writer Ágnes Bálint.

== Narrators ==
- Mazsola: Gertrúd Havas
- Manócska: István Bölöni Kiss
- Tádé: Kató Kovács, Hédi Váradi (1969-1971), Virág Sallay, Irén Szöllősy (1972)
- Mr Varjú: Mara Rebró, István Erdős
- Egérke: Irén Kaszner
- Menyus: Endre Harkányi

== List of episodes ==
Mazsola és Tádé: 1. évad; (1969)	Mazsola és Tádé: 2. évad; (1973)
1. Vigyük haza 2. Tádé orra 3. Hol kicsi, hol nagy 4. Alvóbaba; 5. Sárgarépa; 6. Az a nagyszájú 7. Szerencsére esik 8. Hol az a Tádé?; 9. Ó, az a kályhalyuk 10. Nem félek!; 11. Az eszménykép 12. Tiszteletjegy; 13. Lapulevél köpönyeg	1. Volt egyszer egy kismalac 2. Tengeri csata 3. Kéregpapucs; 4. Mi a fontosabb?; 5. Betegek vagyunk 6. Egy csokor margaréta 7. Érik a szőlő 8. Az asztalláb 9. A gyengék pártfogója 10. Tiszteljük egymás csutkáit

== Legacy ==
In 2022 the Hungarian National Post issued a series of stamps about the characters of "the Hungarian Television's audience favorite puppet series."

== Cultural references ==
The characters were used in a 2023 horror film, obviously aimed at a different audience.
