= Magyar Televízió =

Hungarian public television broadcaster

Coordinates: 47°30′13.44″N 19°2′58.21″E

Magyar Televízió (MTV)
- Type: Non-profit Ltd.
- Industry: Public service broadcasting
- Founded: 22 February 1957; 69 years ago in Budapest, Hungary
- Defunct: 30 June 2015; 11 years ago
- Fate: Folded into Duna Media Service
- Successor: Duna Media Service
- Area served: National, broadcasts in neighbouring countries and online.
- Key people: Balázs Medveczky, Director General
- Services: Public television; Online
- Owner: Media Service Support and Asset Management Fund (Government of Hungary) (2011-2015)
- Website: www.mtv.hu

Magyar Televízió (Hungarian pronunciation: [ˈmɒɟɒr ˈtɛlɛviːzijoː], Hungarian Television) or MTV was a nationwide public television broadcasting organization in Hungary. Headquartered in Budapest, it was the oldest television broadcaster in Hungary and aired five channels: M1 HD, M2 HD and M3.

MTV was managed and primarily funded by the Media Service Support and Asset Management Fund (Hungarian: Médiaszolgáltatás-támogató és Vagyonkezelő Alap, abbreviated MTVA). This government organization, formed in 2011, also managed the public service broadcasters Magyar Rádió and Duna Televízió as well as the Hungarian news agency Magyar Távirati Iroda.

On 1 July 2015, Magyar Televízió as well as the three other public media organizations managed by the MTVA were merged into a single organization called Duna Médiaszolgáltató. This organization is the legal successor to Magyar Televízió and is an active member of the European Broadcasting Union.

== History ==
=== Early years (1954–1969) ===
First pioneer transmissions were in Hotel Gellért in 1936. Test transmissions commenced in 1954, however these were generally with stills or short clips of motion pictures, merely for experimental purposes. Regular test transmissions could be received from 23 February 1957. Transmissions began officially on 1 May 1957, when the May Day ceremonies were brought to the viewers for the first time. Daily news programmes began on 2 July 1957. The television service began its career as part of Hungarian Radio, which was renamed "Hungarian Radio and Television" on 18 August 1957. MTV suggested the establishment of an international organisation for exchanging television material, which was to be named Intervision. The first four members of the organisation were Czechoslovakia, the German Democratic Republic, Hungary and Poland.

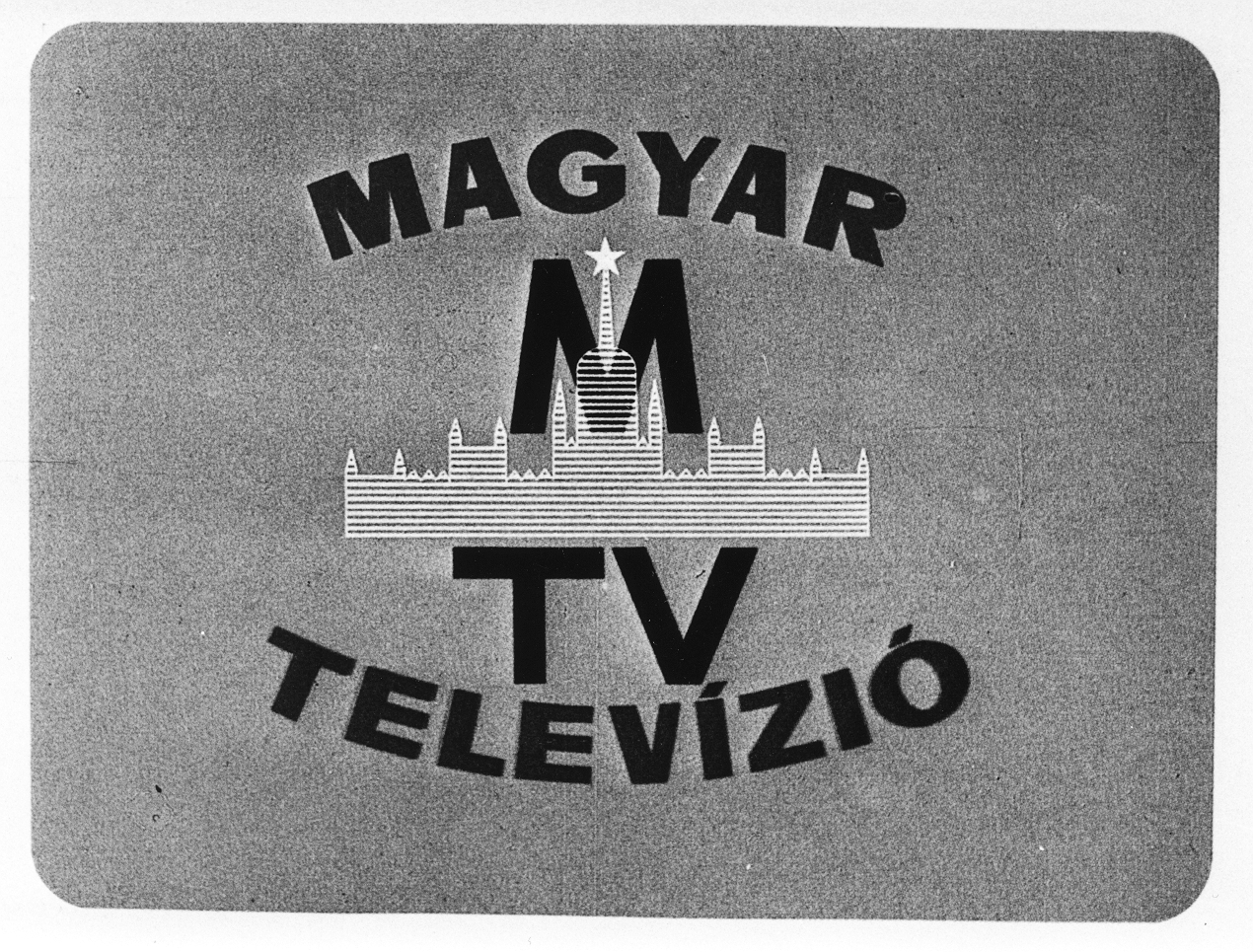
MTV's second logo from 1961 to 1971

By 1959, Hungarian Television had over 50,000 subscribers. In 1960, the Corporation decided to establish an archive, where its programmes are stored even today. In less than ten years of operation, MTV had some 2.7 million viewers by 1964. Studies showed that there were about 3-5 viewers per television set. Another study revealed that by 1965, 46% of the inhabitants of rural areas named television as their choice of entertainment, instead of reading (25%) or radio (10%).

Theatrical transmissions were popular at this time: in 1966 23 plays were broadcast from Budapest, 20 from other cities. Also, 25 television movies and five musicals were transmitted this year.

1969 brought the one millionth subscriber, which meant about 4 million viewers. The first colour recording was made this year: it was Béla Bartók's The Miraculous Mandarin. Although the Orion company presented its first colour television set, transmissions continued to be in black-and-white until 1971.

=== The 1970s ===
1971 brought the first regular transmission in colour, and the test transmissions of a second channel were begun as well. This decade was probably the most proliferous in the history of the whole company, with thousands of hours of programming made. Mazsola és Tádé, a Hungarian puppet animated children TV series was produced between 1969 and 1973.

=== The 1980s ===
Annual programming time reached 4.300 hours, equalling to 83 hours a week. Teletext services commenced in 1981, called Képújság (Picture Newspaper), and television manufacturers started including teletext decoders in their sets. Long-running programmes were started in this decade, including Ablak (Window) and Panoráma (a foreign affairs programme). Regional programming began in 1984 in Pécs, and cable television began in Székesfehérvár the same year. RTV, a programme guide similar to BBC's Radio Times was bought by 1.4 million viewers weekly. MTV's gradual decline began in 1985, this was the final year when MTV was self-sufficient.

The first broadcast of a telenovela on Hungarian television happened in the mid-1980s with the premier of the Brazilian Escrava Isaura (Hungarian title: Rabszolgasors - "Slave Destiny" in English). The first Hungarian soap opera Szomszédok (Hungarian for "Neighbours") also started its 12-year-run on 7 May 1987 and was broadcast every second Thursday.

By the late 1980s, experimental digital television recordings were made, but at the time only in studios. From 1988 seniors of 70 years were exempted from payment of the licence fee. Minority programmes in other languages began too: these programmes were recorded generally in regional studios, primarily in Pécs and Szeged. MTV2 was given some independence from its sister channel MTV1, and just like at the BBC, they were given separate controllers.

By 1989 the service began broadcasting five days per week to prepare the seven days, as previously Monday only. Some exceptions were made from this practice, for example when the first Hungarian cosmonaut, Bertalan Farkas entered space. Nap-kelte (Daybreak), a daily television magazine programme began in 1989, the first programme to be made by an independent Hungarian television company, namely Nap-TV.

=== The 1990s ===
With the changeover from socialism, MTV was completely re-structured, some posts were abolished while others were created. Some programmes were axed from both channels, and new ones were started. This decade was a very hectic time in the life of the company, as TV-presidents seemed to come and go, and so did the programmes.

MTV was admitted as a full active member of the European Broadcasting Union on 1 January 1993, upon the merger of OIRT and EBU. In 1992, a new public service television station was started, and was named Duna Televízió. This was completely independent from MTV, although some collaboration exists between the two. Commercial channels became available to cable viewers in Budapest the same year.

In 1997, TV2 and RTL Klub, two commercial channels were to be launched on the same frequencies where M2 used to be, after it moved to satellite. However, MTV argued that by doing this, its audience would be given to the new channel as a present, which would mean severe disadvantage to both TV2 and RTL Klub, the other debuting commercial channel. The authorities decided to leave the frequency empty, and allocate a new frequency to TV2 and RTL Klub. MTV2, however, was still moved to satellite and cable reception only, which, at the time was quite rare. The programming available on MTV2 was aimed at audiences which were most unlikely to receive the channel, so this meant a severe handicap for the company. Currently the company is recuperating from the decline earlier.

During the 1990s MTV gradually lost its independence and became the voice of the all-time government, often accused of biased on commenting news. It was one of the most popular sources of news, and its background news programmes such as Az Este (The Evening) were both liked and internationally recognised. Its lineup of programmes featured long-running shows, such as the science news programme Delta, whilst other programmes like A Hét (The Week), a weekly review programme and Ablak (Window), an afternoon-long umbrella programme featuring general interest programmes, were both axed later on.

=== The 2000s ===
MTV was continuously underfunded, just like many other public service channels around the globe, and therefore struggled to produce its programmes.

MTV's seventh logo from 2002 to 2012

Whilst remaining entirely state-owned, the company was reorganised as a Closely Held Corporation. Funding changed significantly in 2002 with the end of the mandatory television licence fee levied on all household with a television set. Following this change, funding for MTV instead began to come from government grants and advertising.

The 2006 protests didn't leave the headquarters unscathed; in fact, it was occupied by the rioters for a short time.

In 2000, M2 began broadcasting 24 hours a day, with repeats from its sister channel M1, from its archive library, and from the Hungarian National Digital Archive and Film Institute (Magyar Nemzeti Digitális Archívum és Filmintézet).

=== Reorganization and mergers (2010–2015) ===
In 2011, most of the assets and employees of MTV were transferred to the newly created Media Service Support and Asset Management Fund (Hungarian: Médiaszolgáltatás-támogató és Vagyonkezelő Alap, abbreviated MTVA), a government organization controlled by the Media Council of Hungary. Magyar Rádió and Duna Televízió were also made a part of the MTVA, which, together with MTV, unified all three public service broadcasters in Hungary for the first time. Additionally, the Hungarian news agency Magyar Távirati Iroda was merged into the MTVA and has since been responsible for the production of all news content aired on the three broadcasting organizations.

As the first sign of the expansion of the public television portfolio, the M2 children's channel was launched on 22 December 2012, which ran from 6 am to 8 pm every day. Then, on 20 December 2013, the subscription-only M3 channel was launched, which broadcasts archive content (previously planned to be called Anno). M1 was transformed into a 24-hour news channel from 15 March 2015, and most of its previous programs were then moved to Duna. On the same day, M2 Petőfi TV, primarily aimed at young people, was launched in the nighttime programming slot of M2.

In 2015, the unification of all the public media organizations managed by the MTVA was strengthened when all four were merged into a single organization called Duna Media Service (Hungarian: Duna Médiaszolgáltató). This nonprofit organization is the legal successor to the four formerly separate entities managed by the MTVA.

The creation of the MTVA and transfer of the public media organizations into it has been frequently criticised by non-governmental organizations as being politically motivated and intended to the lessen the independence of the public service media in Hungary. The government has stated that restructuring was necessary to improve the finances of the public media system and that all of the organizations within the MTVA retain editorial independence.

In 2012, MTV launched M3D, the first 3D television channel in Hungary.

== MTV trademark suit ==
Magyar Televízió, who has a trademark on the initials MTV registered with the Hungarian copyright office, sued the American MTV Music Television network for trademark infringement when MTV Music Television launched a Hungarian-language channel in 2007.

In 2008 according to the final verdict of the Hungarian Metropolitan Regional Court, although the national public broadcaster and the American entertainment station are identified by the same brand name in the same market, consumers couldn't confuse those TV channels. The two channels appear with the same label in public, but the services of the public broadcaster and the commercial channel cannot be compared either content-wise or stylistically.

== Notable shows ==
- On the Spot, documentary film series

== Location ==
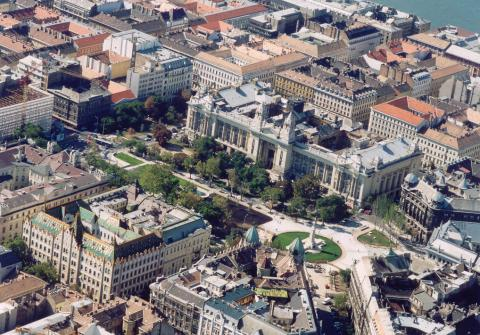
Aerial photography of the old headquarters on Szabadság tér

The Hungarian Television's central building was located on Szabadság tér (Freedom Square), Budapest near to the Parliament. The building gave room to the Stock Exchange before the war. It was sold and MTV has moved to the outskirts of Budapest to a purpose-built modern building.

== See also ==
- Public broadcasting
- Media Services and Support Trust Fund
