= Kossuth Rádió =

Hungarian national radio station

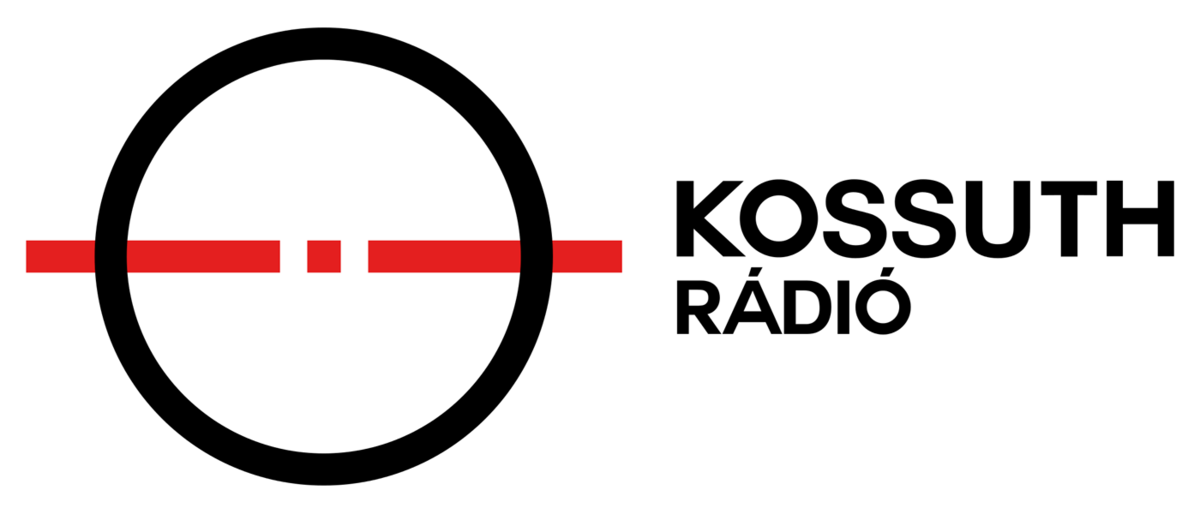
- Slogan: Újra mindenkié (Everyone's radio again)
- Hungary
- Broadcast area: Central Europe
- Frequencies: 540 kHz (AM); 107.8 MHz (in Budapest)
- RDS: KOSSUTH__

Programming
- Language: Hungarian
- Format: News, Talk
- Affiliations: EBU

Ownership
- Owner: Hungarian Radio and Television
- Sister stations: M1

History
- First air date: 1 December 1925; 100 years ago
- Former call signs: A szavak ereje (The power of words) (2007–2013); Otthon a világban (At home in the world) (2013–2026)
- Former names: Rádió Budapest (1925–1932); Budapest I. (1932–1949); MR1-Kossuth Rádió (2007–2011)
- Former frequencies: 67.4 MHz

Technical information
- Power: AM: 2000 kW
- Repeater: 47 FM transmitters

Links
- Website: Official website

Kossuth Rádió (Hungarian pronunciation: [ˈkoʃut ˈraːdijoː], formerly known as MR1-Kossuth Rádió, Rádió Budapest and Budapest I.) is a public-broadcasting radio station in Hungary, concentrating on news and current affairs. It is one of the seven national radio channels owned and operated by Hungarian Radio and Television. It was established in 1925 as Rádió Budapest and named after Lajos Kossuth, a Hungarian national hero, in 1849.

The main Hungarian-language radio station can be heard all over Europe and the Middle East, as it broadcasts with 2 MW of transmission power on 540 kHz AM from transmitter Solt (the most powerful medium wave transmitter in the world) and several FM stations, covering Hungary and the neighbouring countries.

It is the second most popular radio station in Hungary (as of 2013) with 1.38 million listeners (14% of the total population) daily.

== History ==
It was established in 1925 as Radio Budapest and broadcast from Csepel (then suburb of Budapest, now part of the city) with a 2 kW Telefunken-made transmitter on 565 metres AM. The first experimental programme began with this sentence: "Halló-halló! Itt a magyarországi rádióhírmondó 2 kW-os leadó állomása az 565 méteres hullámhosszon." ("Hallo-hallo! Here's the transmitter of the Hungarian radio broadcasting with 2 kW on 565 metres AM."). The first headquarters were built at Rákóczi Avenue and a new 3 kW tower was installed in 1926. At that time the radio was available only in and around Budapest.

National broadcasting started in 1928, when Csepel transmitter was replaced with the 20 kW-strong Lakihegy Tower. In the 1930s several new towers were built; Mosonmagyaróvár, Miskolc, Pécs, Nyíregyháza in 1932 and the new Lakihegy Tower with 120 kW (then the most powerful transmitter in the world) in 1933. New shows and programmes were launched continuously, the most popular was the Hungarian folk music in Gypsy style, heard after the noon bell. The radio station reached 300,000 listeners in 1933.

At the end of the World War II all Hungarian radio towers were exploded by the German army. Reconstruction finished in 1948 and Budapest I. was renamed Kossuth Rádió after Lajos Kossuth in 1949, commemorating the 100th anniversary of the Hungarian revolution of 1848-1849. Lakihegy Tower was rebuilt again in 1968 with a new 300 kW transmitter, but it was getting out of date, so the government decided to build a much powerful tower. Transmitter Solt was finished in 1977 with 2000 kW as a high priority project with the cooperation of the Soviet Union. Nationwide FM transmitters built up in the 2000s and 2010s.

In 2007, the radio station went through a major rebrand, adding the MR1 ("Magyar Rádió 1") handle into its name and switching out the 57-year-old signal package that was used since 1950, the days of Mátyás Rákosi's communist government. The signals were made to sound more modern, with grandiose and fast-paced orchestra and digital beeps that were supposed to represent the dynamic, up-to-date nature of the station's infotainment programmes.

With the change in government power from the social democratic government of MSZP to the right-wing ultranationalist Fidesz and the second premiereship of Viktor Orbán, the radio station went through massive structural changes. Its owner, Magyar Rádió got merged into the new monolith public media company MTVA, went through major changes to its editorial staff and got a brand-new, xylophone-heavy signal package that unified its sound signature with the other public radios and the public television channels of MTVA.

After the end of Orbán's 16-year-long stay in power, the station's broadcast was temporarily suspended at 4 PM on July 7, 2026; Bartók Rádió was available in its place for a while. Before the temporary suspension of the broadcast and the switch to Bartók Rádió, Zsuzsa Garami read the following statement: "Public media should not lie. We apologize for having done so for so many years! Public media is now undergoing a transformation to ensure it remains independent and credible in the future. News broadcasts are temporarily suspended. Please stay tuned! Bartók Rádió’s programs will be broadcast temporarily in place of Kossuth Rádió."

On August 23, 2026, the executives of the public media have announced on the broadcaster's Facebook site that the radio's normal schedule is going to be restarted. The next day at 4:30 AM, the radio's regularly scheduled programming got rebooted with the Rákóczi March and an announcement about the radio's brand new programming structure.

The translated transcript of the announcement: "After sixteen years of being reduced to party propaganda and a transition period of one and a half months, Kossuth Rádió’s programmes can once again be heard. Our programme schedule is constantly being refreshed – we have retained what is worthwhile and are saying goodbye to programmes that have run their course. Old and new programmes, familiar voices and those you may recognise from elsewhere await you, but our news and current affairs programmes, along with some of our key slots, are already up and running.”

The revival of the regularly scheduled programming has also brought a brand-new signal package with it: the new signals draw heavy inspiration from the sound signature of the 2007-2013 MR1 era, complete with fast-paced orchestra and the beeps that used to be unique to the signals of the MR1 era (see above).

== Shows ==
The morning show called 180 perc ("180 minutes") is a three-hour-long news programme, with issues of public concern news and live discussions, economic and political analyses, and reports of our foreign correspondents.

The main news programme Krónika ("Chronicles") is the most listened radio news programme in the country for years. The other Chronicles are refreshed editions. The hourly newscast blocks constitute the frame of the daily programme flow. The station broadcasts news in every half an hour during the morning and afternoon drive-time slots.

In summer 2009 the most recent daily report programme A hely ("The Place") was launched, experimenting with the presentation of events, phenomenon, places and professions from a very insider perspective.

The programme Határok nélkül ("Without borders") was established after the fall of Communism, focusing on the Hungarian diaspora living outside the present-day borders of Hungary due to the Treaty of Trianon. Subsidiaries of Magyar Rádió (MR) report from Bratislava, Uzhhorod, Arad, Târgu Mureș, Miercurea Ciuc, Oradea, Timișoara, Novi Sad, Subotica, Cluj-Napoca and Komárno.

There are several shows of ethnicity groups and religious communities of the country, including a Roman Catholic (Tanúim lesztek), Calvinist (Tebenned bíztunk eleitől fogva), Lutheran (Erős vár a mi Istenünk), Greek Catholic (Krisztus közöttünk), Methodist (Örüljetek az Úrban mindenkor), Baptist (Az Úr közel), Pentecostal (Békesség néktek), Unitarian (Egy az Isten), Jewish (Halljad Izrael) and a Romani (Jelenlét) programme.

== Broadcasting ==
- Transmitter Solt (540 kHz, 2000 kW); the most powerful medium wave transmitter in the world. Kossuth Rádió can be heard all over Central Europe and all over Europe in the evening, as far as Kazan in Russia (~2,200 km).
- 47 FM transmitters nationwide, covering Hungary and the neighbouring territories.
- Satellites Galaxy 19 and Optus D2 for Hungarian Americans and Hungarian Australians.
- The station can be streamed online using a media player or a web browser.

== See also ==
- Lakihegy Tower
- Magyar Televízió
- Eastern Bloc information dissemination
