= Magyar Távirati Iroda =

Hungarian news agency

Coordinates: 47°29′36.41″N 19°2′2.67″E

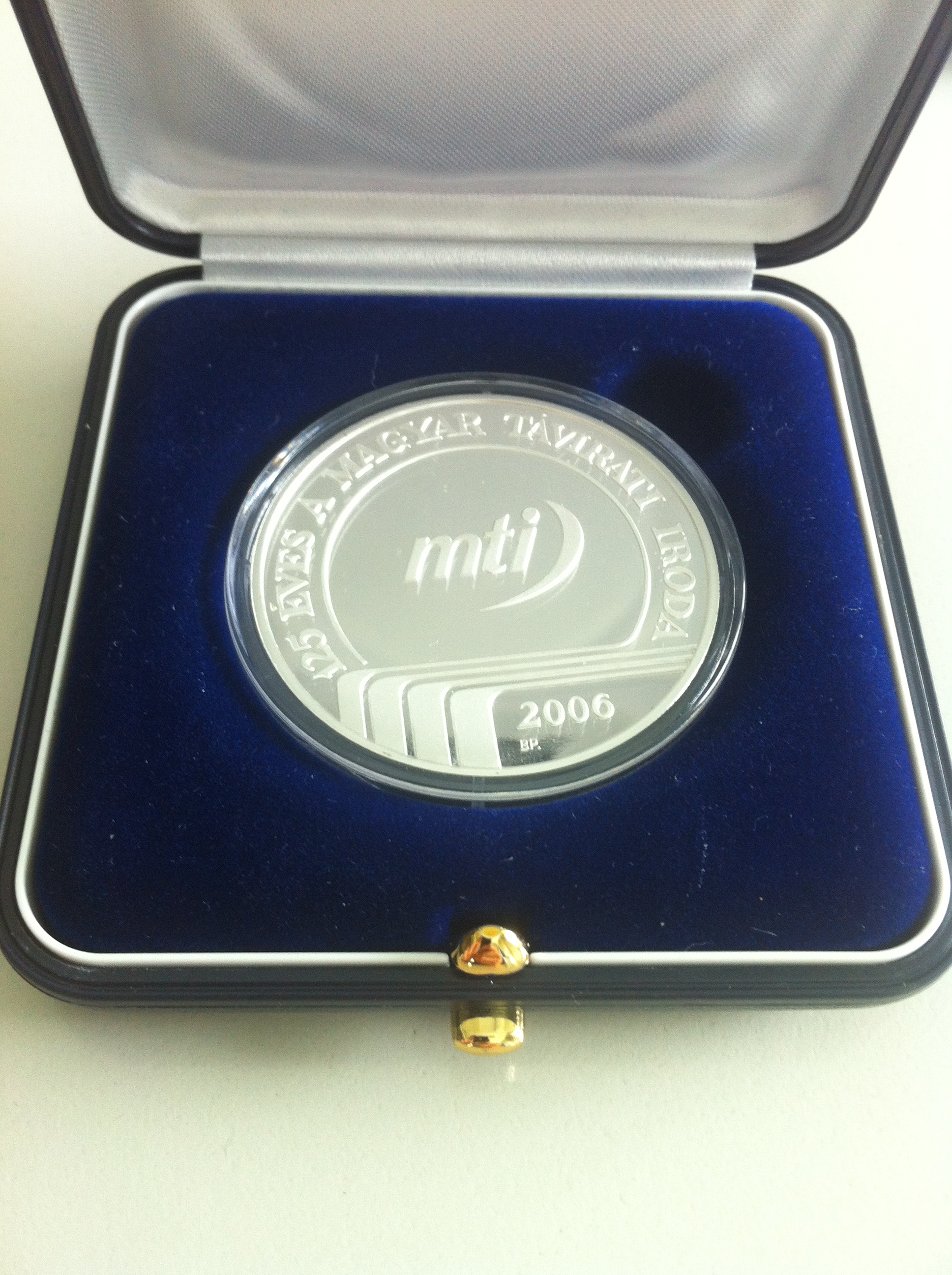
- Commemorative medal issued on the 125th anniversary of the founding of MTI.
- Type: Nonprofit Ltd.
- Founded: March 1, 1881; 145 years ago (original); July 26, 2026; 3 months ago (relaunch)
- Defunct: June 30, 2015; 11 years ago (original)
- Area served: Hungary
- Owner: Független Közmédia Testület (lit. 'Independent Public Media Council')
- Website: https://mti.hu/

MTI (Hungarian: Magyar Távirati Iroda, lit. 'Hungarian Telegraphic Office') is a Hungarian news agency. One of the oldest news agencies in the world, it was founded in 1880.

MTI was owned by MTI Rt., founded by the Parliament. The members of the Owners' Advisory Body are elected by the National Assembly of Hungary on four-year terms. It is a marketleader, and is considered by some sources to be a 'balanced and reliable source'. Still, it finds it difficult to raise subscriptions as most major Hungarian newspapers are foreign-owned. It must turn to the government for capital to overcome its technology deficit.

According to a UNESCO report it faces competition both from independent and specialist news agencies (e.g. English-language on-line news sites, including the Budapest Business Journal, The Budapest Sun, websites of various television and radio stations), and from domestic Hungarian news services established by Reuters and AFP.

On 1 July 2015, Magyar Távirati Iroda as well as the three other public media organizations managed by the MTVA were merged into a single organization called Duna Média. This organization is the legal successor to Magyar Távirati Iroda.

Following the 2026 change of government, a group of journalists at MTI released 482 pages of evidence, showing how news reports were manipulated, falsified, and suppressed under the Orbán regime.
