= Magyar Rádió =

Hungarian public radio broadcaster

Hungarian Radio
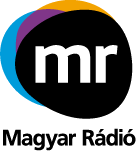
- Magyar Rádió's fourth logo from 2007 to 2012

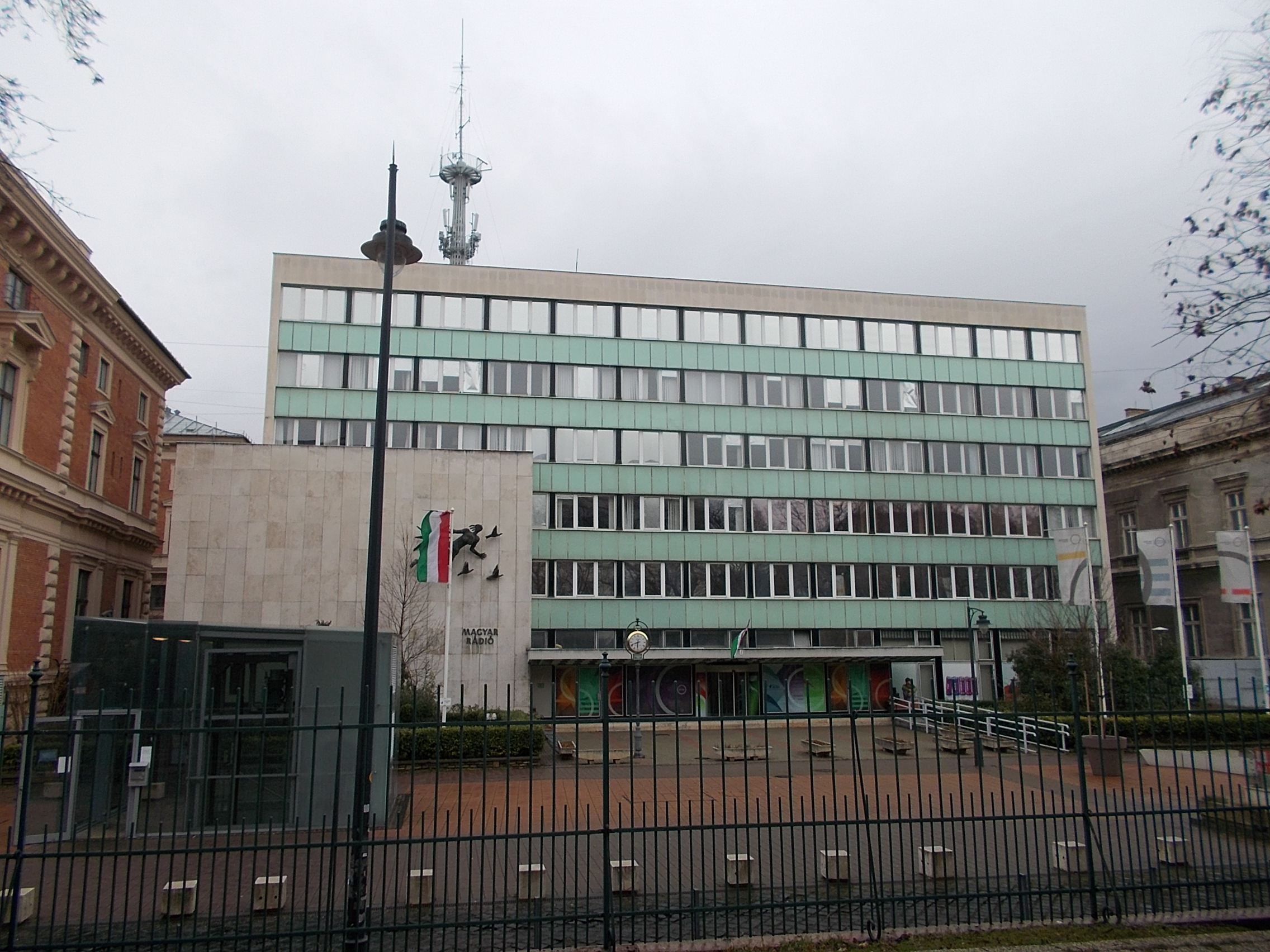
- Headquarters in Budapest (2016)
- Type: Radio network
- Country: Hungary
- Headquarters: 5-7 Bródy Sándor Str., Budapest, H-1088

Ownership
- Parent: Duna Media Service
- Key people: István Jónás (CEO)

History
- Launch date: 1 December 1925; 100 years ago
- Closed: 1 July 2015; 10 years ago
- Replaced by: Duna Media Service

Coverage
- Availability: Hungary and neighbouring countries

Links
- Website: www.radio.hu

Magyar Rádió (Hungarian pronunciation: [ˈmɒɟɒr ˈraːdijoː], MR, The Hungarian Radio Corporation, also known as Radio Budapest) was Hungary's publicly funded radio broadcasting organisation until 2015. It was also the country's official international broadcasting station.

Since 2011, MR has been managed and primarily funded by the Media Service Support and Asset Management Fund (Hungarian: Médiaszolgáltatás-támogató és Vagyonkezelő Alap, abbreviated MTVA). This government organization also managed the public service broadcasters Magyar Televízió and Duna Televízió, as well as the Hungarian news agency Magyar Távirati Iroda.

On 1 July 2015, Magyar Rádió and the three other public media organisations managed by the MTVA were merged into a single organisation called Duna Media Service (Hungarian: Duna Médiaszolgáltató). This organization is the legal successor to Magyar Rádió and is an active member of the European Broadcasting Union.

== Domestic networks ==
With its headquarters in Budapest and regional offices around the country, MR was responsible for public service broadcasting throughout the Hungarian Republic. As well as maintaining regional studios, the corporation produced multiple different Hungarian-language radio channels (Kossuth, Petőfi, and Bartók) covering the full range of public-service radio provision, and a fourth channel (MR4) aimed at the country's linguistic minorities.

=== Kossuth Rádió ===
Created in 1925 and named after Lajos Kossuth, the channel is the official radio station of Hungary. It is the main channel of Hungarian Radio. It primarily broadcasts news, including interviews, discussions, reports, and other speech-based programmes.

=== Petőfi Rádió ===
Named after the poet Sándor Petőfi, the station is aimed at younger generations and broadcasts pop music.

=== Bartók Rádió ===
Named after the composer Béla Bartók, the station is dedicated to classical music. It hosts talk programmes in addition to orchestral and opera music. Supposedly, only a few thousand people listen to this station, and proposals to terminate Rádió Bartók have been made several times but never enacted.

=== Nemzetiségi Rádió ===
This radio channel airs programmes in languages of the national minorities of Hungary.

=== Parlamenti Adások ===
Parliamentarian broadcasts.

=== Dankó Rádió ===
Named after Pista Dankó, this radio station airs regional content throughout Hungary, plays folk music, and broadcasts operetta shows. It claims to be available 24/7 on the internet and FM. Also broadcasting on weekdays via medium wave. Then the station's frequencies are handed over to Kossuth Rádió for the rest of the night.

== History and profile ==
Hungarian Radio uses the slogan often heard in radio commercials: "From clear source only". The buildings and studios of the Radio are located in Budapest, in the block between Bródy Sándor Street and Pollack Mihály Square. The construction of Studio No. 6, an orchestral studio, is linked to Georg von Békésy’s name, who was awarded the Nobel Prize for his acoustic research in 1961.

On 1 July 2007, Radio Budapest cancelled programming in foreign languages.

On 22 December 2012, all regional public service radio programs were cancelled and regional studios closed permanently.

On 30 June 2011, Magyar Radio closed its Radio Theatre Office and dismissed all dramaturgy staff.

Digital radio broadcasting (DAB+) experiments, which carried all public service stations and were never licensed commercially, was terminated on 5 September 2020.

== In popular culture ==
In 1974, Locomotiv GT's Locomotiv GT (Dunhill Records 811) was released with a bumper sticker with the slogan "Radio Budapest Loves You!"

== See also ==
- György Szepesi, Hungarian radio personality and sports executive
