= Hungary in the Eurovision Song Contest 2009 =

- Eurovision Song Contest 2009
- Participating broadcaster: Magyar Televízió (MTV)
- Country: Hungary
- Selection process: Internal selection
- Announcement date: 23 February 2009

Competing entry
- Song: "Dance with Me"
- Artist: Zoli Ádok
- Songwriters: Zé Szabó; Kasai

Placement
- Semi-final result: Failed to qualify (15th)

Participation chronology

Hungary was represented at the Eurovision Song Contest 2009 with the song "Dance with Me", written by Zé Szabó and Kasai, and performed by Zoli Ádok. The Hungarian participating broadcaster, Magyar Televízió (MTV), internally selected its entry for the contest. MTV initially announced "If You Wanna Party" performed by Márk Zentai as its entry on 3 February 2009, however, the song was withdrawn on 4 February 2009 as it was presented in 2004 as the Swedish Big Brother theme song "We Became Friends". "Magányos csónak" performed by Kátya Tompos was announced as the replacement entry on the same day, however, the song was also withdrawn on 10 February 2009 and "Dance with Me" performed by Zoli Ádok was announced as the final replacement on 23 February 2009.

Hungary was drawn to compete in the second semi-final of the Eurovision Song Contest, which took place on 14 May 2009. Performing during the show in position 11, "Dance with Me" was not among the 10 qualifying entries and therefore did not compete in the final. It was later revealed that Hungary placed fifteenth out of the 19 participating countries in the semi-final with 16 points.

== Background ==
Prior to the 2009 contest, Magyar Televízió (MTV) had participated in the Eurovision Song Contest representing Hungary seven times since their first entry in 1994. Its best placing in the contest was fourth, achieved with its début entry in 1994 with the song "Kinek mondjam el vétkeimet?" performed by Friderika Bayer. MTV had attempted to participate in the contest in 1993, however, its entry was eliminated in the preselection show Kvalifikacija za Millstreet. The broadcaster withdrew from the contest for six years between 1999 and 2004 and also missed the 2006 contest. In 2007, it achieved achieved its second best result in the contest since their début, placing ninth with the song "Unsubstantial Blues" performed by Magdi Rúzsa. In 2008, it failed to qualify to the final with the song "Candlelight" performed by Csézy.

As part of its duties as participating broadcaster, MTV organises the selection of its entry in the Eurovision Song Contest and broadcasts the event in the country. The broadcaster confirmed its intentions to participate at the 2009 contest on 18 November 2008. MTV has organised both internal selections and national selection shows to select its entries. The broadcaster opted to select its entry internally for 2009 with details being released on 14 January 2009.

== Before Eurovision ==
=== Internal selection ===
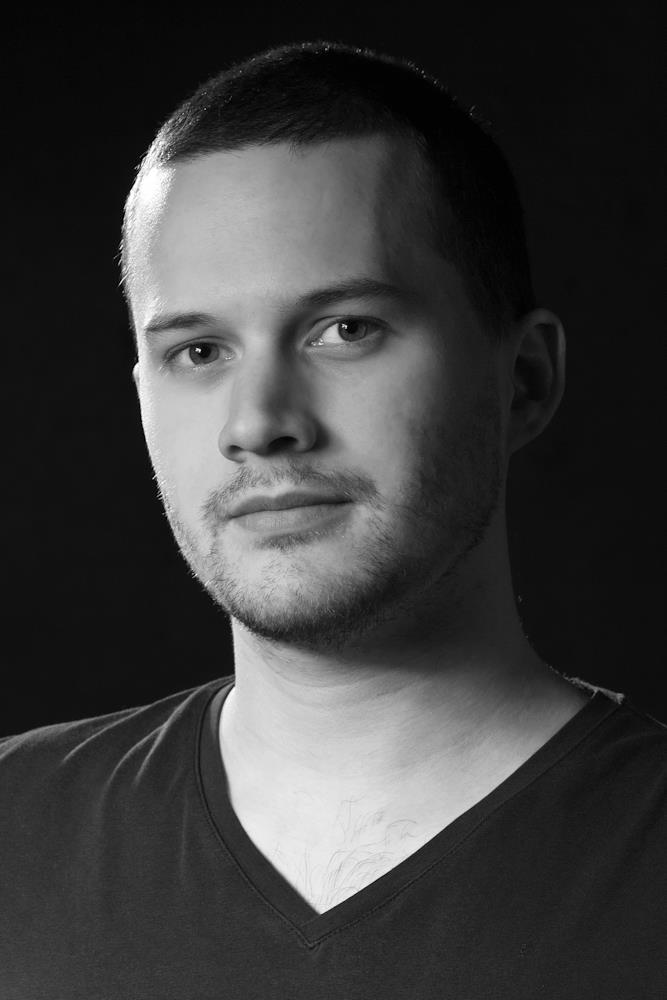
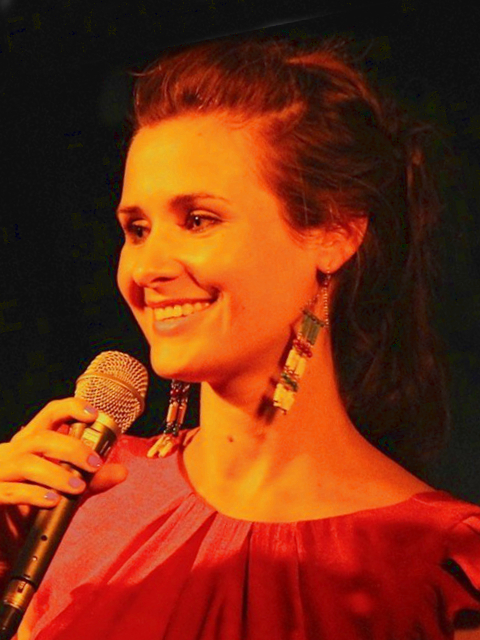
Márk Zentai (left) and Kátya Tompos (right) both withdrew their selected entries for Hungary at the Eurovision Song Contest 2009

On 14 January 2009, MTV announced that it would select internally its entry for the Eurovision Song Contest 2009. Artists and composers were able to submit their applications and entries until 2 February 2009. After the submission deadline had passed, 105 entries were received by the broadcaster, including songs from Germany and the United Kingdom. On 3 February 2009, MTV announced during a press conference held in Budapest that Márk Zentai would represent Hungary in Moscow with the song "If You Wanna Party". The song was written by Figge Boström, George Németh, Johan Lindman, Lasse Anderson and Zé Szabó, and was part of Zentai's latest album Nem elég. The five-member jury panel that selected the Hungarian entry consisted of Andrea Szulák (singer and presenter, represented Hungary in 1993), Zsolt Lengyel (director), László Szűts (Mahasz board member), Levente Harsányi (presenter) and Gábor Gundel Takács (presenter, commentator).

On 4 February 2009, MTV announced that Zentai had withdrawn from the contest as "If You Wanna Party" was presented in 2004 as the Swedish Big Brother theme song "We Became Friends", breaching the rules of the contest. The song "Magányos csónak", written by Gábor Duba and Géza Pálvölgyi and performed by Kátya Tompos was announced as the replacement on the same day, however the singer announced her withdrawal on 10 February 2009 in order to dedicate herself to her theatre career instead, having to take part in eight plays of three different theatres meaning she had no time to prepare her Eurovision participation properly. The jury subsequently shortlisted three entries that meet the contest requirements from the remaining 103 submissions, with their artists confirming their acceptance to represent Hungary before the final decision was made. On 23 February 2009, "Dance with Me" written by Zé Szabó and Kasai and performed by Zoli Ádok was announced by MTV as the second and final replacement during a press conference held in Budapest.

=== Controversy ===
Following the selection of Kátya Tompos as the Hungarian entrant, the Alliance of Hungarian Popular Music Composers and Songwriters published an open letter protesting that the jury, which they claimed to be not professional, did not have enough time to make a correct decision. They also expressed dissatisfaction that a majority of the initially selected song was written by foreign songwriters and that only a jury decided on the entry instead of the public as it was at Eurovision. MTV later published a reply stating that the jury, being professionals from the television and music industry, had enough time to make the right decision as they chose the song all day long. They also mentioned that the European Broadcasting Union (EBU) allowed national broadcasters to decide in what way they want to choose a song, and that their goal was to send a song that was the most suitable for the contest.

== At Eurovision ==
According to Eurovision rules, all nations with the exceptions of the host country and the "Big Four" (France, Germany, Spain and the United Kingdom) are required to qualify from one of two semi-finals in order to compete for the final; the top nine songs from each semi-final as determined by televoting progress to the final, and a tenth was determined by back-up juries. The European Broadcasting Union (EBU) split up the competing countries into six different pots based on voting patterns from previous contests, with countries with favourable voting histories put into the same pot. On 30 January 2009, an allocation draw was held which placed each country into one of the two semi-finals. Hungary was placed into the second semi-final, to be held on 14 May 2009. The running order for the semi-finals was decided through another draw on 16 March 2009 and Hungary was set to perform in position 11, following the entry from Slovenia and before the entry from Azerbaijan.

The two semi-finals and the final were broadcast in Hungary on m1 with commentary by Gábor Gundel Takács. The Hungarian spokesperson, who announced Hungarian votes during the final, was Éva Novodomszky.

=== Semi-final ===
Zoli Ádok took part in technical rehearsals on 6 and 9 May, followed by dress rehearsals on 13 and 14 May. The Hungarian performance featured Zoli Ádok joined on stage by three dancers, all of them which began the performance in black and white costumes lying down. The performers then woke up with the dancers removing Ádok's costume before undressing themselves, revealing a skin-tight shirt for the singer and skimpy dresses for the dancers. The stage costumes for the performance were designed by Tamás Náray. The performers then completed an interactive dance routine, including a somersault performed by Ádok. The LED screens projected floating shapes, expanding white lines and the title of the song during the chorus. The three dancers that joined Zoli Ádok were Tímea Papp, Titanilla Béli and Zita Karsai. Papp was also the choreographer for the Hungarian performance. The performance also featured two backing vocalists: Gábor Heincz and the co-composer of "Dance with Me" Kasai Jnofinn.

At the end of the show, Hungary was not announced among the top 10 entries in the second semi-final and therefore failed to qualify to compete in the final. It was later revealed that Hungary placed fifteenth in the semi-final, receiving a total of 16 points.

=== Voting ===
The voting system for 2009 involved each country awarding points from 1-8, 10 and 12, with the points in the final being decided by a combination of 50% national jury and 50% televoting. Each nation's jury consisted of five music industry professionals who are citizens of the country they represent. This jury judged each entry based on: vocal capacity; the stage performance; the song's composition and originality; and the overall impression by the act. In addition, no member of a national jury was permitted to be related in any way to any of the competing acts in such a way that they cannot vote impartially and independently.

Below is a breakdown of points awarded to Hungary and awarded by Hungary in the second semi-final and grand final of the contest. The nation awarded its 12 points to Azerbaijan in the semi-final and to Norway in the final of the contest.

==== Points awarded to Hungary ====
Points awarded to Hungary (Semi-final 2)
Score	Country
12 points	
10 points	
8 points	Azerbaijan
7 points	
6 points	
5 points	
4 points	
3 points	Albania; Spain
2 points	Slovakia
1 point	

==== Points awarded by Hungary ====
Points awarded by Hungary (Semi-final 2)
Score	Country
12 points	Azerbaijan
10 points	Norway
8 points	Ukraine
7 points	Estonia
6 points	Greece
5 points	Moldova
4 points	Albania
3 points	Denmark
2 points	Serbia
1 point	Croatia

Points awarded by Hungary (Final)
Score	Country
12 points	Norway
10 points	Azerbaijan
8 points	Ukraine
7 points	Iceland
6 points	Estonia
5 points	Turkey
4 points	Greece
3 points	Denmark
2 points	Albania
1 point	United Kingdom

==== Detailed voting results ====
Detailed voting results from Hungary (Final)
R/O	Country	Results			Points
R/O	Country	Jury	Televoting	Combined	Points
01	Lithuania				
02	Israel				
03	France				
04	Sweden				
05	Croatia				
06	Portugal				
07	Iceland	10	3	13	7
08	Greece		6	6	4
09	Armenia				
10	Russia				
11	Azerbaijan	8	12	20	10
12	Bosnia and Herzegovina				
13	Moldova	1	1	2	
14	Malta	4		4	
15	Estonia	7	5	12	6
16	Denmark	6		6	3
17	Germany	3		3	
18	Turkey		7	7	5
19	Albania		4	4	2
20	Norway	12	10	22	12
21	Ukraine	5	8	13	8
22	Romania				
23	United Kingdom	2	2	4	1
24	Finland				
25	Spain				
