= Krisztina Rátonyi =

Hungarian news presenter (born 1990)

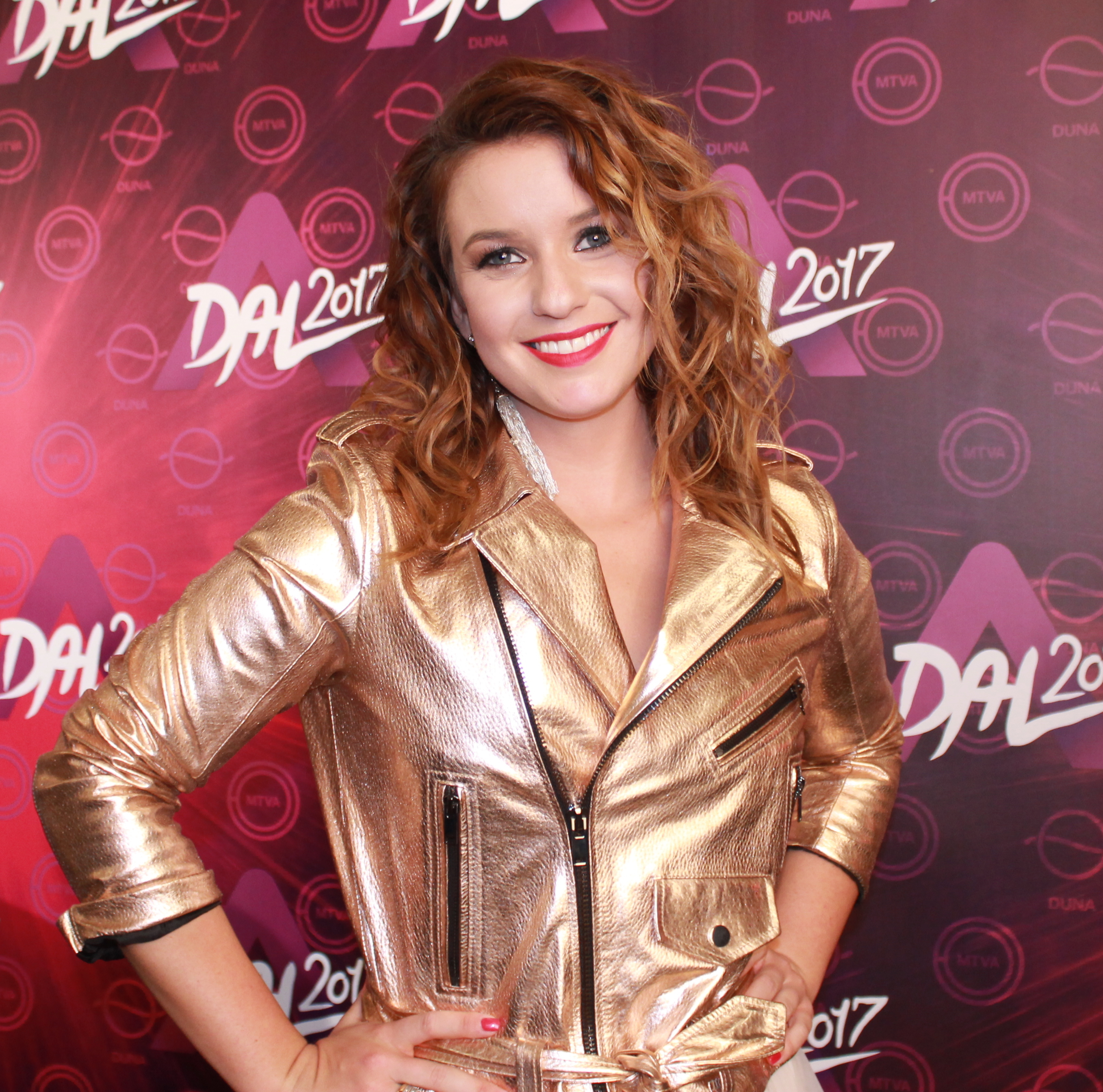
- Rátonyi in 2017
- Born: 23 September 1990 (age 36); Budapest, Hungary
- Presenting career
- Stations: Duna; Former: M1; M2 Petőfi TV
- Network: Duna Media Service – MTVA
- Country: Hungary

Krisztina Rátonyi (born 23 September 1990) is a Hungarian news presenter.

As a child, she played as an extra and minor roles at the Hungarian State Opera House. She first appeared on an episode of the TV series Családi kör ("Family Circle") at the age of nine, which was followed an appearance on the Képben vagyunk magazine. This was followed by an appearance on another TV series, Klipperek, and the Duna TV-based Cimbora. She studies at the Faculty of Humanities at ELTE. She won the Junior Prima Award in 2016.

In the summer of 2013, she was the presenter of Balatoni nyár on M1, and later, Noé barátai and Bízunk benned!. She also was a host on M2's A legokosabb osztály, along with István Kovács. She was a part of the backstage for the 2014 edition of A Dal, along with Levente Harsányi. In addition, she was part of the backstage crew for Eurovision Song Contest's radio show on the M1 TV network. She also substituted for Csilla Tatár in hosting the semifinals of the 2017 edition of A Dal, due to Tatár being sick. In 2017 she became a coach in the Hungarian version of I Love My Country, called Magyarország, szeretlek! (I Love You, Hungary!) on the public national main channel, Duna, thus she quit her job at youngster-focused M2 Petőfi TV.

Along with Freddie, she was the commentator of the Hungarian transmission of the Eurovision Song Contest from 2017 to 2019 on Duna. In 2021 she quit Noé barátai, where her former M2 Petőfi TV colleague, Imre Fodor took over her role. In 2021 she was one of the hosts of the daily summer talkshow called Nyár 21 (Summer 21).
