= Levente Harsányi =

Hungarian television presenter

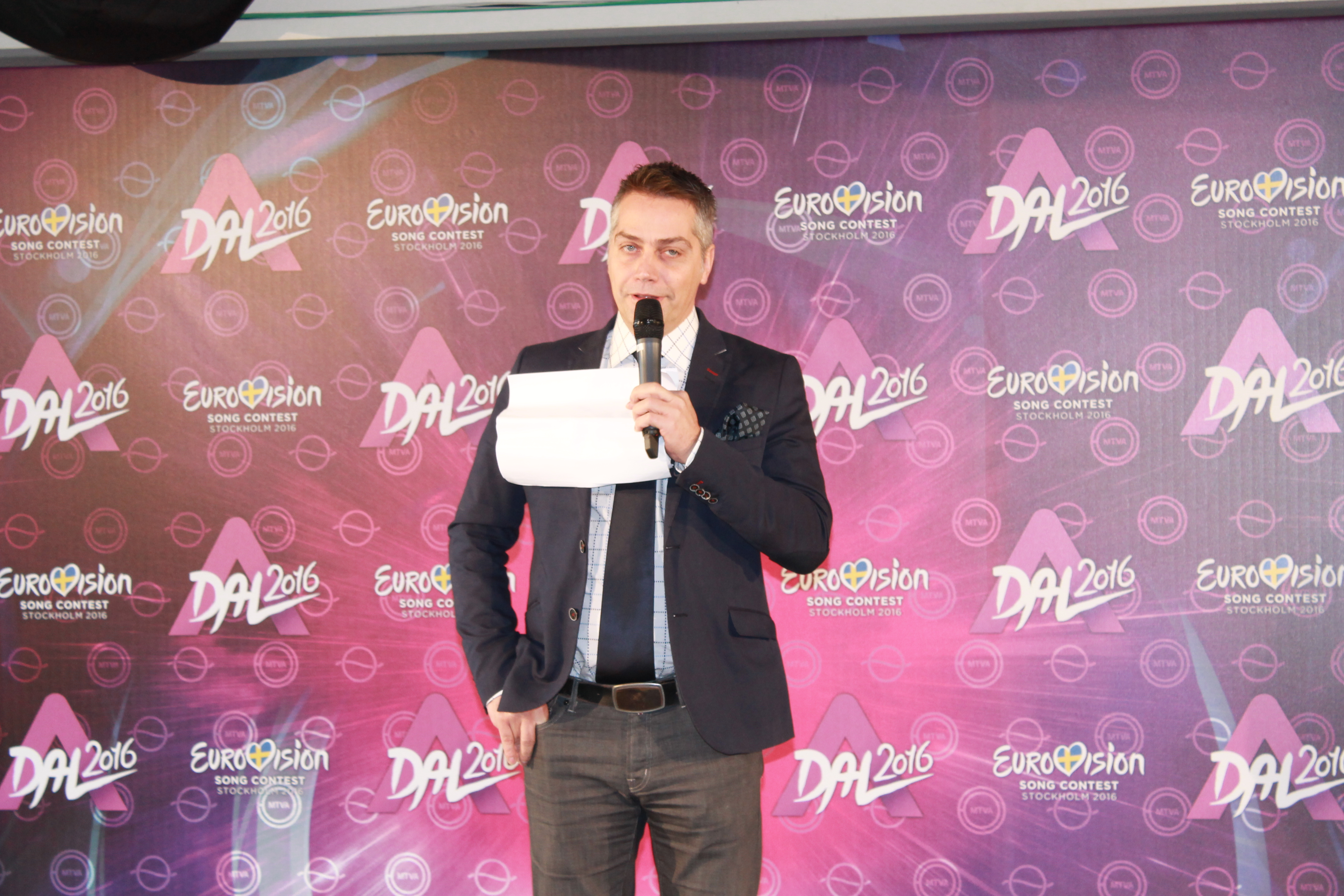
- Levente Harsányi in 2015.
- Born: 21 March 1970 (age 56); Budapest, Hungary
- Presenting career
- Stations: M1, Duna TV
- Network: Magyar Televízió, Duna TV, MTVA
- Country: Hungary

Levente Harsányi (born 21 March 1970, Budapest) is a Hungarian television presenter and singer.

== Career ==
Harsányi's career started in 1996 when he hosted the TV3 programs Aszfaltbetyár and Zenefon in 1997. In 1998, he made his radio debut on the Radio 1 special program Telefonbetyárral. Meanwhile, he also graduated from a university, majoring in communications. From 2000 to 2002, he hosted the Luxor gaming show on Magyar Televízió. Between 2001 and 2003, he was a regular on the morning show Radio Roxy and from 2003 to 2004, he was a co-host of Dalnokok ligája. From 2003 to 2005, he was also on another morning show, Radio Deejay, and again in 2005, he was on the show Vásott kölykök. Along with Gábor Gundel Takács and Tibor Dévényi, he was also co-host of Csináljuk a fesztivált.

He was the host of the 2008 national final for Hungary in the Eurovision Song Contest 2008 with Éva Novodomszky. Between 2006 and February 2012, he was also a host for the Rádió 1 breakfast show Kukori, along with Anita Hudák, Mariann Peller, and Endre Hepi.

From 7 March 2012 to the end of February 2013, he led the Music FM-based morning show Önindító with Steve Hajdu and Petra Pordán.

In 2013, he was the co-host of the M1 show Legenda.

In 2014, along with Krisztina Rátonyi, he was one of the song backstage presenters of the M1 radio show covering the Eurovision Song Contest 2014. Starting in 2015, he started to become involved with A Dal as a backstage host, and eventually, by the 2016 edition, became one of the main hosts along with Csilla Tatár.

Since 2016, he has been a captain of the Duna-produced Magyarország, szeretlek! program. By May 30, he was also introduced as a co-host of the Petőfi Rádió breakfast show Talpra Magyar along with Mariann Peller and Miki Szakál. Also this year, he also became host of the Balatoni program. During the 2016 European Football Championship is a regular guest of the M4 Sports We came, we saw, visszanéznénk! It reproduces by.

Along with Krisztina Rátonyi, he was co-host of the 2016 Petőfi Music Awards gala at the VOLT Festival, along with Miss World Hungary and, with Csilla Tatár, hosts of the Duna channel.

== Awards ==
- Best Radio Host (2001, 2002)
