= Miklós Malek =

Miklós Malek may refer to

- Miklós Malek (composer) (born 1945), Hungarian classical composer, arranger and musician
- Miklós Malek (musician), a.k.a. Miklós Malek Jr., (born 1975), Hungarian pop music songwriter, producer, artist and television personality, son of composer Miklós Malek above
