= Tánclépés =

Studio album by Zoli Ádok
- Released: 2008
- Genre: Pop

Zoli Ádok chronology
Tánclépés (2008)	Három álom (2011)

Tánclépés is a first album by Hungarian singer Zoli Ádok, released 2008. The album contains 13 songs.

== Track listing ==
1. Tánclépés
2. Manolita
3. Egyszer nézett rám
4. Legfázósabb nyár
5. Kódzsungel
6. Van idõ
7. A lekled porcelán
8. Megy a show
9. Soha ne mondd, hogy vége
10. Velem a fény
11. A legpocsékabb kávé
12. Dance with Me
13. Tanclépés (Markanera remix)
