= Csilla Tatár =

Hungarian reporter and presenter (born 1983)

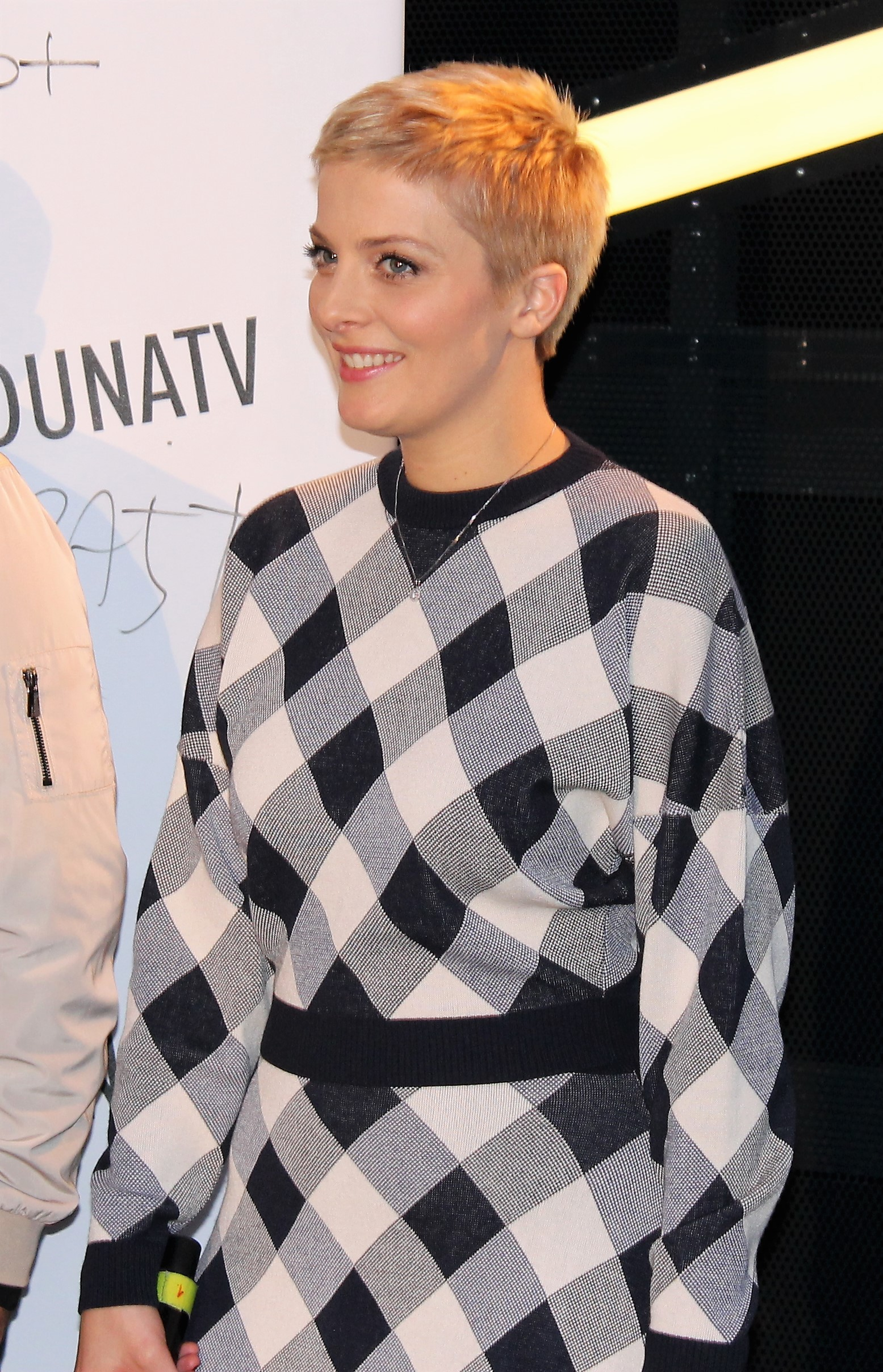
- Tatár in 2016
- Born: 27 May 1983 (age 43); Budapest, Hungarian People's Republic
- Education: Budapest Metropolitan University
- Occupations: Reporter; presenter
- Presenting career
- Stations: M1; Duna TV
- Network: Magyar Televízió; Duna TV; MTVA; TV2
- Country: Hungary

Csilla Tatár (born 27 May 1983) is a Hungarian reporter and presenter.

== Biography ==
Tatár made her first appearance in 1996, at the age of 13, when she recited a poem on Duna TV. Since 2002, she has been a reporter and editor. In 2009, she graduated from the Budapest Metropolitan University College of Communication and Business.

She worked for 12 years as a presenter on TV2, but since December 2014, she works at MTVA. Here, she became the host of A Dal.

From 2015 to 2017, she presented Hungary's points for the Eurovision Song Contest, replacing Éva Novodomszky.

== Filmography ==
=== TV2 Group ===
- Aktív (2002–2011) Editor and reporter
- Magellán (2002–2006) Editor and reporter
- Favorit (2007) Editor and reporter
- Kölykök (2007) line-producer
- Macsólabor (2009) Presenter
- Megamánia (2010) Editor and presenter
- MegaBackstage (2012) Presenter
- A Szépségkirálynő (2012, 2013) Presenter
- Mokka (2011–2014) Presenter

=== Duna Média ===
- A Dal (2015) – presenter, with Levente Harsányi (M1, Duna World)
- Én vagyok itt! (2015) – presenter (M2 Petőfi)
- Böngésző (2015) – presenter (M2 Petőfi)
- Eurovision Song Contest (2015, 2016, 2017) – presenter, spokeswoman of the Hungarian vote (Duna)
- Miss World Hungary – Magyarország szépe (2015) – presenter, with Levente Harsányi (Duna)
- A Dal (2016) – presenter, with Levente Harsányi (Duna, Duna World)
- Magyarország, szeretlek! (2016) – team captain (Duna)
- Miss World Hungary – Magyarország szépe (2016) – presenter, Levente Harsányi (Duna)
- 47. Debreceni virágkarnevál (2016) – presenter, with Vajk Szente (Duna World)
- A Dal (2017) – presenter, with Levente Harsányi (Duna, Duna World)

== Awards ==
- Presenter of the year (Glamour Women of the Year, 2012)
- Fittest presenter of the year (Fitbalance Award, 2014)
