= Zoli Ádok =

Hungarian pop singer, actor and dancer

- Born: Zoltán Ádok; 22 March 1976 (age 50)
- Origin: Szeged, Hungary
- Genres: Pop
- Occupations: Singer, actor, dancer
- Instrument: Vocals
- Years active: 2000–present
- Website: adokzoli.hu

Zoltán Ádok (born Szeged, Hungary, 22 March 1976), better known as Zoli Ádok, is a Hungarian pop/musical singer, actor and dancer. He represented Hungary in the Eurovision Song Contest 2009 with the song "Dance With Me".

== Biography ==
=== Early life ===
Zoli Ádok was born on 22 March 1976 in Szeged, Hungary. He is the second child in his family. He has one sister.

=== Career ===
Zoli's career began from 1996 when after finishing his dance studies in Pécs, he started his career with Ivan Marko in the Hungarian Festival Ballett. He later joined the Le Dance Contemporary Dance Company led by award-winning Andrea Ladányi. He moved on to travel around the world as a dancer and musical actor in Switzerland in the musical Fame.

In 2008, Zoli released his debut album, which is called Tánclépés.

In 2009, Zoli represented Hungary in the Eurovision Song Contest 2009 with the song "Dance With Me". Zoli's song was the internal selection jury's third choice, but after the original winning song was disqualified and the first runner-up withdrawn, Zoli's song was chosen for Moscow. He competed in the second semi-final but failed to reach the final. He did however, win the Barbara Dex Award.

Zoli released his second album in 2011, entitled Három álom.

Zoli Adok has left Hungary and started performing on various luxury cruise lines:

- 2012–2013 Crystal Cruises
- 2013–2015 Celebrity Cruises as a lead vocalist on the Celebrity Eclipse and Celebrity Solstice

Since 2016 he has been a lead vocalist on Princess Cruises including Grand Princess, Golden Princess and the Star Princess. He notably was the first ever Hungarian lead singer in Princess Cruise's 52-year history. He opened a show called “Born to dance”, working with Daniel C. Leine as director and Steven Schwartz, whose work includes Wicked, Gospel, and Pippin, as producer.

== Discography ==
=== Albums ===
Year	Album
2008	Tánclépés
2011	Három álom

=== Singles ===
Year	Single
2009	"Dance With Me"
2010	"Why Don't You"
2011	"Harom Alom"

Awards and achievements
Preceded by Csézy with "Candlelight"	Hungary in the Eurovision Song Contest; 2009	Succeeded by Kati Wolf with "What About My Dreams?"
