= Music FM =

Music FM may refer to:

- Music FM Radio Guangdong, a radio station in Guangdong, People's Republic of China
- Music FM (Hungary), a radio station
- Music FM (Romania), a radio station that is a sister station of Pro FM
