= V.I.P. (Hungarian band) =

Hungarian pop boy band

V.I.P
- Origin: Hungary
- Genres: Pop; dance-pop; R&B
- Years active: 1997-2001
- Label: BMG
- Past members: Alex Józsa; Imre Rakonczai; Viktor Rakonczai; Gergő Rácz

V.I.P. were a Hungarian pop boy band founded in 1997 and dissolved in 2001, consisted of 4 members including 2 brothers.

== History ==
They represented Hungary in the Eurovision Song Contest 1997 with the song "Miért kell, hogy elmenj?" ("Why Do You Have To Go?"). They tied for twelfth place with Greece with 39 points. One of them, Viktor Rakonczai composed the song Szívverés for Csézy, who represented Hungary in the Eurovision Song Contest 2008.

Their single in 1998, "Keresem a lányt", sampled NSYNC's "Tearin' Up My Heart".

In total, VIP released four albums. In 2001, the singers each decided to go their own way, and the boy band was disbanded.

== Discography ==
=== Studio albums ===
- 1997 – VIP (BMG)
- 1998 – Keresem a Lanyt (BMG)
- 1999 – Szükségem van rad (BMG)
- 2000 – Csak Neked (BMG)
- 2001 – Best of (BMG)

=== Singles ===
- 1997 – "Miért kell, hogy elmenj?"
- 1998 – "Keresem a lányt"

== Band members ==
Gergő Rácz

Gergő Rácz is a Hungarian composer, singer, producer, winner of the Phonogram award. He was born on 4 March 1976, in Budapest.

Imre Rakonczai

Imre Rakonczai is a Hungarian musician, composer, lyricist, brother of Viktor Rakonczai. He was born on 1 September 1972, in Budapest. He is also a footballer. He played for Ferencvárosi TC in 1982 until 1994.

Viktor Rakonczai

Viktoe Rakonczai is an EMeRTon award-winning Hungarian musician, composer, pianist, performer, brother of Imre Rakonczai. He was born on 16 October 1976, in Budapest.

== See also ==
- Hungarian pop

Awards and achievements
Preceded by Csaba Szigeti with "Új név egy régi ház falán"	Hungary in the Eurovision Song Contest; 1997	Succeeded by Charlie with "A holnap már nem lesz szomorú"
