= László Hadady =

French oboist of Hungarian origin (born 1956)

László Hadady (born 1956) is a French oboist of Hungarian origin, currently a soloist and professor at the Conservatoire de Paris.

== Biography ==
Born in Békésszentandrás (Hungary), Hadady studied music at the Franz Liszt Academy of Music of Budapest. He graduated in 1979 after training in solfège, harmony, musical analysis, oboe, piano, chamber music, pedagogy and aesthetics.

He joined the Hungarian Symphony Orchestra as a soloist in 1976.

He remained in this position until 1980, when he joined the Ensemble intercontemporain under the direction of Pierre Boulez.

Appointed a professor at the Conservatoire de Paris in 1995, he gives masterclasses all over the world (from Tokyo to Buenos Aires, and from Melbourne to Damascus).

That same year 1995 he was a member of the jury of the Third International Competition for Solo Oboe in New York in 1995 and he was also invited by the Chicago Symphony Orchestra for two solo concerts.

Continuing his international career as a soloist, he has performed in more than 44 countries and has been the host of various orchestras in France, Hungary, Germany, Argentina and the United Kingdom with the Philharmonia Orchestra of London.

As a chamber musician, László Hadady is a member of the Nielsen Wind Quintet and has performed beside Shlomo Mintz, Zoltán Kocsis, Miklós Perényi, Christian Zacharias, Jean-François Heisser, Anne Queffélec, Philip Smith (principal trumpet of the New York Philharmonic), Jean-Claude Pennetier, Jacques Rouvier as well as with the Takács, Keller, and Bartók quartet.

László Hadady plays a F. Lorée oboe manufactured by Alain de Gourdon (Paris)

== Discography ==
- Integral of the five concertos for oboe and oboe d'amore by Johann Sebastian Bach
- Five Sonatas by Johann Sebastian Bach
- Chemin IV and Sequenza VII by Berio (Naxos label)
- Bach, Haendel, Church mélodies (La Cause)
