= Ildikó Komlósi =

Hungarian mezzo-soprano (b. 1959)

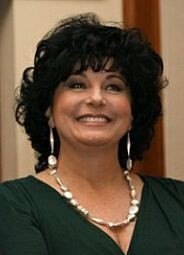
Komlósi in 2010

Ildikó Komlósi (pronounced [ˈildikoː ˈkomloːʃi]) (Békésszentandrás, 1959) is a Hungarian mezzo-soprano.

== Biography ==
Komlósi studied music at the Franz Liszt Academy of Music of Budapest and attended specialising classes at the Academy of the Teatro alla Scala in Milan and the Guildhall School of Music & Drama in London.

In 1986, she won the Pavarotti International Competition and debuted in Verdi’s Requiem opposite Luciano Pavarotti under the baton of Lorin Maazel. Following her successful debut, she has been invited to perform at the world’s most important theatres, such as: Wiener Staatsoper; Teatro alla Scala in Milan; Frankfurt Staatsoper; Teatro Municipal in Santiago de Chile; Metropolitan Opera and Carnegie Hall in New York; Teatro San Carlo in Naples; Teatro del Maggio Musicale Fiorentino in Florence; Arena di Verona; Royal Opera House-Covent Garden in London; and Théâtre de La Monnaie in Bruxelles. She collaborated with conductors Sir Colin Davis, Ivan Fisher, Valery Gergiev, Zubin Mehta, and Antonio Pappano.

Highlights of her busy career include: Don Giovanni (Donna Elvira) at the Teatro Carlo Felice in Genoa; Bluebeard's Castle (Judith) at the Turku Opera; Carmen (title role) at the Semperoper in Dresden; La Forza del Destino (Preziosilla) at the Metropolitan Opera in New York; Ariadne auf Naxos at the Teatro alla Scala in Milan; Cavalleria Rusticana (Santuzza) and Carmen at the Arena in Verona; Aida at the Frankfurt Oper, at the Baths of Caracalla in Rome and at the Teatro alla Scala in Milan under the baton of Riccardo Chailly for the opening of the 2006–2007 season; Cavalleria Rusticana and Oedipus Rex (Jocasta) at the Teatro Regio in Turin; Verdi’s Requiem in Cagliari; Cavalleria Rusticana at the Deutsche Oper Berlin and in Naples; Bluebeard's Castle in Bilbao; Verdi’s Requiem with the London Philharmonic Orchestra and Vladimir Jurowski in London; Dvorak’s Requiem at the Gran Teatre del Liceu in Barcelona; Cavalleria Rusticana in Cagliari, Barcelona and Palermo; and Adriana Lecouvreur (Principessa di Bouillon) in Palermo.

She recently performed: Salome at the Metropolitan Opera in New York; Parsifal (Kundry) at the Deutsche Oper in Berlin; Don Carlos at the Semperoper in Dresden; Aida in Berlin and Munich; Das Lied von der Erde in Oviedo, Antwerp and Gent; Carmen and Bluebeard's Castle in Rome; and Missa Solemnis in Palermo.

Her future plans include: Aida and Rusalka (Jezibaba) in Barcelona; Die Frau ohne Schatten (Die Amme) at the Metropolitan Opera in New York; Ciarondejska (Princess Evpraksija) in Antwerp; Bluebeard's Castle in Tokyo; Les Troyens (Cassandre) at the Deutsche Opera Berlin; Aida in Masada with Daniel Oren; Mahler’s Symphony No.2 at the Teatro Massimo in Palermo.

== Career ==
- 1986: Winner of "Pavarotti Concours"
- 1986: Debut with "Messa da Requiem" of Giuseppe Verdi, with Luciano Pavarotti and Susan Dunn, directed by Lorin Maazel
- 1989: At Oper Frankfurt of Frankfurt
- 1989: At Staatsoper of Vienna
- 1990: At La Scala of Milan with the opera "Blimunda"
- 1991/1992: Various appearances in opera theatres of Houston, Philadelphia, Cleveland, Bregenz, San Francisco, Stockholm, Hamburg, Naples and Catania.
- 1993: At Palacio de Bellas Artes of Mexico City with the opera "Werther"
- 1993: In Municipal Theatre of Santiago, Chile with "Lucrezia Borgia" and "Anna Bolena"
- 1995: In Charleston (South Carolina) with "Der Rosenkavalier", with the Budapest Festival Orchestra
- 1997: At Maggio Musicale Fiorentino of Florence, with "Ariadne auf Naxos", directed by Zubin Mehta and Jonathan Miller
- 1998: In Strasbourg with "La Pulzella di Orléans", as Joan of Arc
- 1999: At Metropolitan Opera of New York, with "Werther"
- 2000: At Royal Festival Hall of London sings "Ariadne auf Naxos" with Edita Guberova
- 2001: At Teatro di San Carlo of Naples with "Don Carlos"
- 2002: At Théâtre de La Monnaie of Brussels with "Aida", as Amneris (Aida)
- 2003: At Royal Opera House of London with '"Aida", as Amneris (Aida)
- 2004: Again at Théâtre de La Monnaie of Brussels with l'"Aida", as Amneris (Aida)
- 2004: At Semperoper of Dresden with "Don Carlos"
- 2004–2005: In a tour on Japan with "Aida", as Amneris (Aida)
- 2005: At Teatro Lirico of Cagliari with "La Gioconda", as Laura Adorno
- 2005: At Arena di Verona with "La Gioconda", as Laura Adorno
- 2005: At Teatro Carlo Felice of Genoa with "Donna Elvira"
- 2005: At Opera of Turku with "Il castello di Barbablù"
- 2005: At Semperoper of Dresden with "Carmen"
- 2005: At Metropolitan Opera of New York with "La forza del destino"
- 2005: At La Scala of Milan with "Ariadne auf Naxos"
- 2006: At Arena di Verona with "Cavalleria rusticana" and "Carmen"
- 2005: At La Scala of Milan with "Aida"
- 2006: At Oper of Frankfurt with "Aida"
- 2006: At Baths of Caracalla of Rome with "Aida"
- 2008: At Teatro dell'Opera di Roma with "Carmen"

== See also ==
- Sarajevo Philharmonic Orchestra
