= Csabacsűd =

- Large village
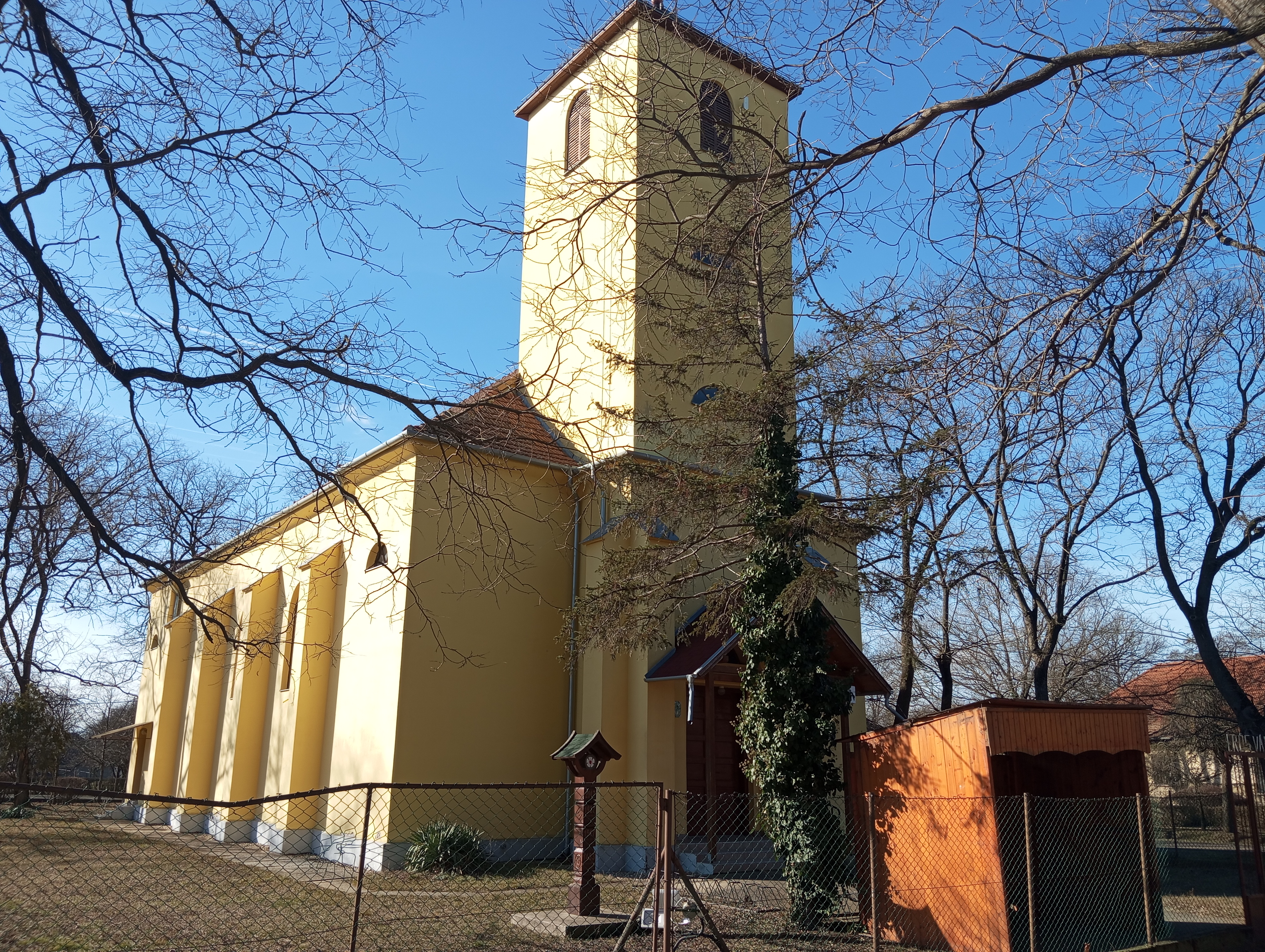
- Lutheran church in Csabacsűd

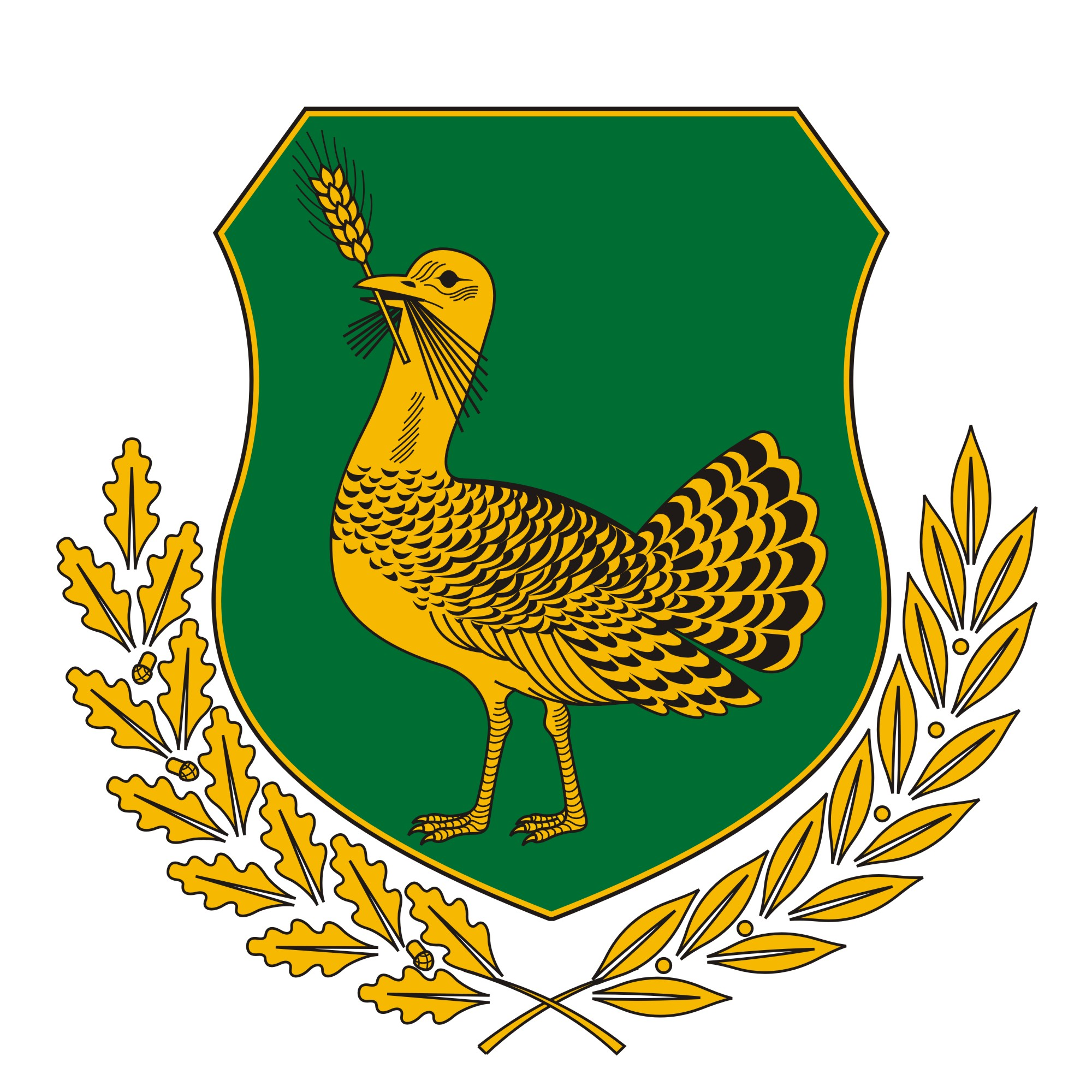
- Coat of arms

- Location of Csabacsűd
- Coordinates: 46°49′N 20°39′E
- Country: Hungary
- County: Békés
- District: Szarvas

Area
  - Total: 66.85 km^{2} (25.81 sq mi)

Population (2024)
  - Total: 1,600
  - Density: 24/km^{2} (62/sq mi)
- Time zone: UTC+1 (CET)
  - Summer (DST): UTC+2 (CEST)
- Postal code: 5551
- Area code: (+36) 66

Csabacsűd is a village in Békés County, in the Southern Great Plain region of south-east Hungary.

== Geography ==
It covers an area of 66.88 km^{2} and has a population of 1600 people (2024). It lies 40 kilometers from Békéscsaba, the county capital.

== History ==
The village was first mentioned in writing in 1444, and a document from 1456 identifies the village as belonging to the estate of John Hunyadi. In 1598, the village was entirely abandoned. When Csabacsűd was eventually repopulated, it was placed under the jurisdiction of the nearby village of Békésszentandrás. In 1735, the villagers participated in peasant's revolt led by Pera Segedinac.

Following Hungary's defeat in the Hungarian Revolution of 1848, the Hungarian baron József Eötvös hid from the Habsburgs in Csabacsűd.

== Demographics ==
As of 2023, the village had a population of 1593.

The village was 92.1% Hungarian, 13% Slovak, and 2.2% of non-European origin. 24.9% of the villagers identified as Lutheran, 7% Roman Catholic, 2.7% Calvinist, and 40.1% chose not to answer.
