= 1993 interruption of DuckTales in Hungary =

On 12 December 1993, following the death of Prime Minister of Hungary József Antall, public television broadcaster Magyar Televízió (MTV) interrupted an afternoon broadcast of the 1987 animated series DuckTales to provide coverage of Antall's death. The event and its abrupt change in tone were described as a flashbulb memory for the generation of children watching at the time.

== Background ==
In the early 1990s, MTV operated two broadcast channels, MTV1 and MTV2, which were then also the only television channels in Hungary. The broadcaster offered a Sunday afternoon programming block for children of programming from The Walt Disney Company dubbed into Hungarian, titled Walt Disney bemutatja (Walt Disney presents). The block, launched in 1991, garnered a domestic audience of two and a half million viewers.

Antall, who became the first democratically elected Prime Minister of Hungary following the 1990 parliamentary election, suffered from non-Hodgkin lymphoma during his term in office, a condition which ultimately became terminal in late 1993. On 12 December, he died in office aged 61.

== Event ==
After news of Antall's death reached MTV management at around 16:45 (CET), MTV1's coverage coordination fell to its deputy editor-in-chief, István Stefka, his boss being absent for a country trip, and interior minister Péter Boross arrived at the broadcaster's headquarters to make a statement which was to be televised. Stefka and other employees agreed to immediately break into programming due to the subject matter, in spite of the Walt Disney bemutatja block being scheduled to remain for twenty minutes on air.

The programming interruption occurred at 18:08 while airing the episode "A Whale of a Bad Time", during a scene in which Scrooge McDuck throws a tantrum and pulls away a tablecloth after learning that a sea monster had devoured his cash, shortly before being interrupted by Huey, Dewey and Louie; the programme abruptly cut to a slide of the MTV1 logo in black and white, set to Frédéric Chopin's Funeral March. A few minutes later, Boross appeared on-screen to make the public announcement of Antall's death, with news coverage continuing into the evening. The exact number of viewers at the time of the event is unknown, as television viewership figures in Hungary were not recorded until a year later.

== Analysis and aftermath ==
The abrupt nature of the event caused confusion and anger within the generation of children watching when it occurred, who experienced politics and the concept of death for the first time. This generation subsequently came to be known as the "DuckTales generation". The event itself is considered a flashbulb memory, with its significance being compared in Hungarian media to the cultural shock of the assassination of John F. Kennedy and the September 11 attacks, with some media outlets also drawing parallels with the 1939 wartime shutdown of the BBC Television Service, which was immediately preceded by a screening of Mickey's Gala Premier.

Ex Symposion, a Hungarian publication, dedicated a 2010 issue to the generational impact of the event, noting that children at the time did not yet understand the concept of death due to their early age. Some were still able to recall specific details of the event as adults, up to the exact point of dialogue when the interruption occurred. Others expressed their distaste in politics as a direct result of the event. It was noted that a previous interruption of Walt Disney bemutatja to broadcast a speech by Pope John Paul II in Máriapócs on 18 August 1991 did not produce the same generational shock as the one caused by Antall's death.

The DuckTales episode involved in the incident was not rebroadcast in Hungary until 2000 on RTL Klub. Members of the generation later created a group on Facebook dedicated to the event, entitled "Those who watched Sunday Disney when József Antall died" (Akik nézték a vasárnapi Disney-t, amikor meghalt Antall József). In 2022, the Hungarian dub of the series as originally broadcast by MTV was made available on Disney+.
