= Gödény-halom =

Prehistoric mound in Hungary

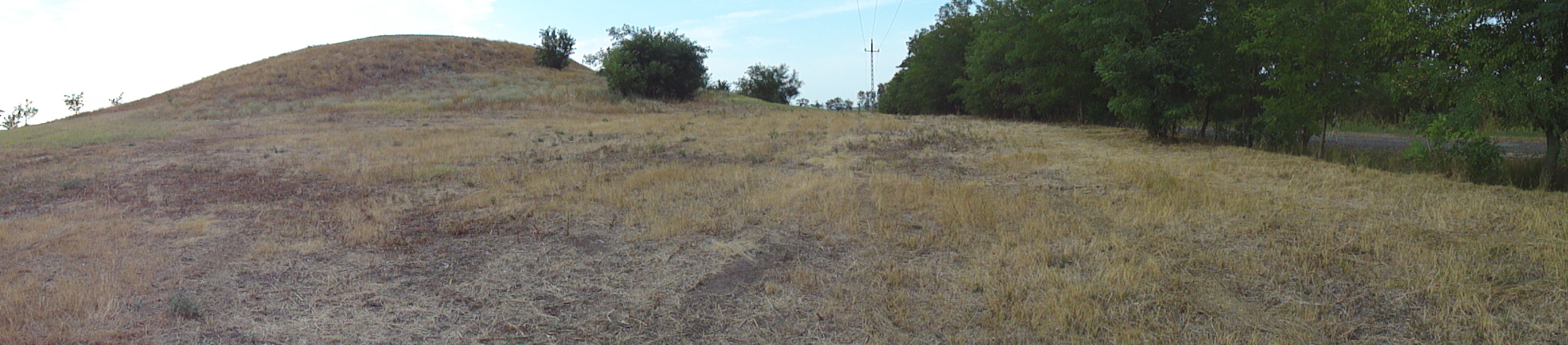
- Panoramic view of Gödény-halom

- Location within Hungary
- 46.813306°N 20.444658°E
- Type: Tumulus
- Periods: Neolithic / Bronze Age
- Location: Békésszentandrás
- Region: Hungary

Gödény-halom (transl. Pelican mound) is a prehistoric mound situated near the village of Békésszentandrás in Békés County, in the Southern Great Plain region of south-east Hungary.

== Description ==
Gödény-halom is situated 7 kilometres away from the inner area of Békésszentandrás, close to the old road to Szentes. It is in the one-time flood area of the River Hármas-Körös. The name gödény (English: pelican) refers to the fact that it was once a roosting spot for pelicans in the swampy area. Today, it marks the county boundaries of Békés, Csongrád and Szolnok. Part of the northern side has been destroyed for the building of roads and a nearby dam.

Gödény-halom is the largest of the so-called Cumanian mounds of central Europe, and the highest prehistoric mound in Hungary with a height 12.2 metres. The Cumanian mounds are structures of uncertain age and origin and made by humans. It is generally thought that they were used as burial places in the Neolithic and Bronze Ages.
