= Hungary in the Eurovision Song Contest 2008 =

- Eurovision Song Contest 2008
- Participating broadcaster: Magyar Televízió (MTV)
- Country: Hungary
- Selection process: Eurovíziós Dalverseny 2008: Magyarországi döntő
- Selection date: 8 February 2008

Competing entry
- Song: "Candlelight"
- Artist: Csézy
- Songwriters: Viktor Rakonczai; Jánosi; Imre Mózsik

Placement
- Semi-final result: Failed to qualify (19th)

Participation chronology

Hungary was represented at the Eurovision Song Contest 2008 with the song "Candlelight", composed by Viktor Rakonczai, with lyrics by Jánosi and Imre Mózsik, and performed by Csézy. The Hungarian participating broadcaster, Magyar Televízió (MTV), selected its entry through the national final Eurovíziós Dalverseny 2008: Magyarországi döntő. 15 entries competed in the national final where "Szívverés" performed by Csézy was selected as the winner based on the votes of a four-member jury panel as well as the votes from the public. The song was later translated from Hungarian to English for Eurovision and was titled "Candlelight". Composer Rakonczai had represented Hungary in 1997 as part of the band V.I.P..

Hungary was drawn to compete in the second semi-final of the Eurovision Song Contest which took place on 22 May 2008. Performing during the show in position 15, "Candlelight" was not among the 10 qualifying entries of the second semi-final and therefore did not qualify to compete in the final. It was later revealed that Hungary placed nineteenth (last) out of the 19 participating countries in the semi-final with 6 points.

== Background ==
Prior to the 2008 contest, Magyar Televízió (MTV) had participated in the Eurovision Song Contest representing Hungary six times since its first entry in 1994. Its best placing in the contest was fourth, achieved with its début entry in 1994 with the song "Kinek mondjam el vétkeimet?" performed by Friderika Bayer. MTV had attempted to participate in the contest in 1993, however, its entry was eliminated in the preselection show Kvalifikacija za Millstreet. The broadcaster withdrew from the contest for six years between 1999 and 2004 and also missed the 2006 contest. In 2007, it achieved its second best result in the contest, placing ninth with the song "Unsubstantial Blues" performed by Magdi Rúzsa.

As part of its duties as participating broadcaster, MTV organises the selection of its entry in the Eurovision Song Contest and broadcasts the event in the country. The broadcaster confirmed its intentions to participate at the 2008 contest on 17 May 2007. MTV has organised both internal selections and national selection shows to select its entries. The broadcaster opted to organize a national selection show for 2008 with details being released on 9 November 2007.

== Before Eurovision ==
=== Eurovíziós Dalverseny 2008: Magyarországi döntő ===
Eurovíziós Dalverseny 2008: Magyarországi döntő was the national final organised by MTV to selecte its entry for the Eurovision Song Contest 2008. Fifteen entries competed in the competition which took place at the Pólus Center's Fortuna Stúdió in Budapest and was hosted by Éva Novodomszky and Levente Harsányi. The show was broadcast on m1 as well as online at mtv.hu.

==== Format ====
The competition consisted of one show, held on 8 February 2008, and featured fifteen entries. The Hungarian entry for Belgrade was selected by public televoting and a four-member jury panel. Each juror assigned scores to each entry ranging from 1 (lowest score) to 10 (highest score) immediately after the artist(s) conclude their performance. The summation of the jury scores created a final ranking from which points from 1 (lowest) to 15 (highest) were distributed. The public was able to submit their votes via telephone or SMS and the overall ranking of the entries was also assigned points from 1 to 15. The summation of the jury and public votes determined the winning entry. In the case of a tie, the tie was decided in favour of the entry which received a higher number of points from the public.

The jury panel consisted of:

- Miklós Malek – Ferenc Erkel award-winning composer and conductor
- Eszter Horgas – musician
- László Benkő – composer, keyboardist for the Hungarian band Omega
- Balázs Lévai – MTV programme editor, director and presenter

==== Competing entries ====
Artists and composers were able to submit their applications and entries for the competition between 9 November 2007 and 12 December 2007. Only artists that had a valid contract with a record company/professional management or had released a record were eligible to compete. All songs were required to be submitted in both Hungarian and English. After the submission deadline had passed, 30 entries were received by the broadcaster. A four-member preselection jury selected fifteen entries for the competition. The jury consisted of Miklós Malek, Eszter Horgas, László Benkő and Balázs Lévai. The competing entries were announced on 14 January 2008.

Artist	Song	Songwriter(s)
21 Gramm	"Még egy dal"	László Müller, 21 Gramm
Adrien Szekeres	"Piszkos tánc"	Adrien Szekeres, Gábor Kiss
Candies	"Van aki nyer"	Szabó Zé, Ákos Várszegi
Csaba Gál – Boogie	"Úgy figyeltelek"	Csaba Walkó, Csaba Gál, István Balahoczky
Csézy	"Szívverés"	Viktor Rakonczai, Jánosi
Dure	"Nem ismerlek már"	Dure
Ez One	"Lesz, ki téged hazavár"	Attila Fehér, Ákos Várszegi
Fiesta	"Gyűlölve szeretni"	Tamás Knapik
Lola	"Legszebb nap"	Eszter Major, Viktor Rakonczai
Monika Hoffman	"Légy te az első"	Ágnes Szabó, Zoltán Dandó
Orsolya Pflum	"Távol"	János Bende, Tamás Kelemen
Orsolya Szatmári	"Véletlen"	László Sárkány, Richárd Révész
Zsuzsa Antal and Fishers Company	"Falak között"	Charles Fisher, Zsuszsanna Antal
Zsuzsa Imre	"Érintés"	Gábor Mészáros, Sándor K. Varga
Zsuzsi Vágó and Árpád Zsolt Mészáros	"Két szív"	Tibor Kocsák, Szillárd Somogyi, Tibor Miklós

==== Final ====
The final took place on 8 February 2008 where fifteen entries competed. "Szívverés" performed by Csézy was selected as the winner by the combination of votes from a jury and a public televote consisting of votes submitted through telephone and SMS. Adrien Szekeres and Csézy were both tied with 29 points but since Csézy received the most votes from the public she was declared the winner. In addition to the performances of the competing entries, guest performers included Friderika Bayer (who represented Hungary in 1994), V.I.P. (who represented Hungary in 1997), Nox (who represented Hungary in 2005), and Magdi Rúzsa (who represented Hungary in 2007).

Final – 8 February 2008
R/O	Artist	Song	Jury	Televote	Total	Place
1	Candies	"Van aki nyer"	3	5	8	12
2	Ez One	"Lesz, ki téged hazavár"	1	4	5	15
3	Zsuzsi Vágó and Árpád Zsolt Mészáros	"Két szív"	12	13	25	3
4	Monika Hoffman	"Légy te az első"	9	1	10	11
5	Zsuzsa Antal and Fishers Company	"Falak között"	13	7	20	5
6	Fiesta	"Gyűlölve szeretni"	8	12	20	4
7	Zsuzsa Imre	"Érintés"	5	10	15	10
8	Csaba Gál – Boogie	"Úgy figyeltelek"	10	8	18	7
9	Lola	"Legszebb nap"	8	11	19	6
10	Adrien Szekeres	"Piszkos tánc"	15	14	29	2
11	Dure	"Nem ismerlek már"	3	3	6	14
12	Orsolya Pflum	"Távol"	12	6	18	8
13	Csézy	"Szívverés"	14	15	29	1
14	21 Gramm	"Még egy dal"	5	2	7	13
15	Orsolya Szatmári	"Véletlen"	8	9	17	9

Detailed Jury Votes
R/O	Song	M. Malek	E. Horgas	L. Benkő	B. Lévai	Total	Points
1	"Van aki nyer"	7	6	6	7	26	3
2	"Lesz, ki téged hazavár"	6	5	6	5	22	1
3	"Két szív"	9	8	9	8	34	12
4	"Légy te az első"	7	8	9	7	31	9
5	"Falak között"	9	10	9	8	36	13
6	"Gyűlölve szeretni"	7	8	8	7	30	8
7	"Érintés"	7	6	7	7	27	5
8	"Úgy figyeltelek"	8	8	8	9	33	10
9	"Legszebb nap"	8	7	8	7	30	8
10	"Piszkos tánc"	10	10	9	10	39	15
11	"Nem ismerlek már"	6	6	8	6	26	3
12	"Távol"	9	9	8	8	34	12
13	"Szívverés"	10	9	10	9	38	14
14	"Még egy dal"	6	6	8	7	27	5
15	"Véletlen"	8	8	7	7	30	8

=== Preparation ===
On 11 February, it was announced that Csézy would perform "Szívverés" in English at the Eurovision Song Contest. The English version, titled "Candlelight", was presented on the same day.

== At Eurovision ==
It was announced in September 2007 that the competition's format would be expanded to two semi-finals in 2008. According to Eurovision rules, all nations with the exceptions of the host country and the "Big Four" (France, Germany, Spain, and the United Kingdom) are required to qualify from one of two semi-finals in order to compete for the final; the top nine songs from each semi-final as determined by televoting progress to the final, and a tenth was determined by back-up juries. The European Broadcasting Union (EBU) split up the competing countries into six different pots based on voting patterns from previous contests, with countries with favourable voting histories put into the same pot. On 28 January 2008, an allocation draw was held which placed each country into one of the two semi-finals. Hungary was placed into the second semi-final, to be held on 22 May 2008. The running order for the semi-finals was decided through another draw on 17 March 2008 and Hungary was set to perform in position 15, following the entry from Georgia and before the entry from Malta.

The two semi-finals and the final were broadcast in Hungary on m1 with commentary by Gábor Gundel Takács. MTV appointed Éva Novodomszky as its spokesperson to announce the Hungarian votes during the final.

=== Semi-final ===
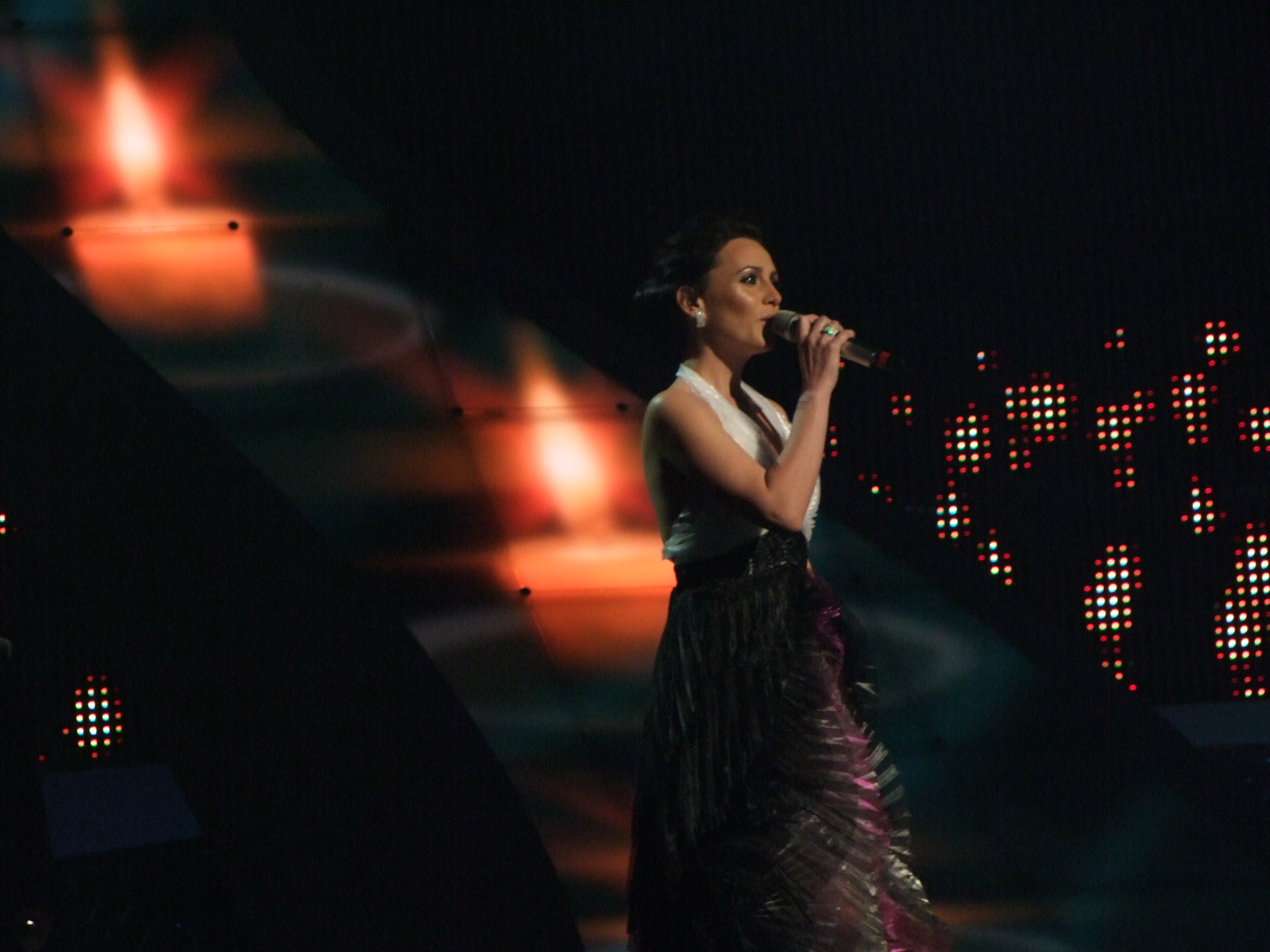
Csézy during a rehearsal before the second semi-final

Csézy took part in technical rehearsals on 14 and 18 May, followed by dress rehearsals on 21 and 22 May. The Hungarian performance featured Csézy in a black, white and pink dress with the stage displaying real candles and the LED screens projecting artificial candles. On stage, Csézy was joined by four backing vocalists: Miklós Németh, Ignác Czutor, Gergő Rácz and Gábor Molnár. The performance also featured a pianist: the co-composer of "Candlelight" Viktor Rakonczai. Viktor Rakonczai and Gergő Rácz previously represented Hungary in 1997 as part of V.I.P., with all backing performers being members of the a cappella group Fool Moon.

At the end of the show, Hungary was not announced among the top 10 entries in the second semi-final and therefore failed to qualify to compete in the final. It was later revealed that Hungary placed nineteenth (last) in the semi-final, receiving a total of 6 points.

=== Voting ===
Below is a breakdown of points awarded to Hungary and awarded by Hungary in the second semi-final and grand final of the contest. The nation awarded its 12 points to Denmark in the semi-final and to Azerbaijan in the final of the contest.

==== Points awarded to Hungary ====
Points awarded to Hungary (Semi-final 2)
Score	Country
12 points	
10 points	
8 points	
7 points	
6 points	
5 points	
4 points	Serbia
3 points	
2 points	
1 point	Denmark; Georgia

==== Points awarded by Hungary ====
Points awarded by Hungary (Semi-final 2)
Score	Country
12 points	Denmark
10 points	Croatia
8 points	Ukraine
7 points	Iceland
6 points	Portugal
5 points	Cyprus
4 points	Turkey
3 points	Bulgaria
2 points	Georgia
1 point	Sweden

Points awarded by Hungary (Final)
Score	Country
12 points	Azerbaijan
10 points	Russia
8 points	Greece
7 points	Serbia
6 points	Ukraine
5 points	Turkey
4 points	Norway
3 points	Israel
2 points	Denmark
1 point	Sweden
