= Szarvas =

Szarvas Sarvaš
- Town
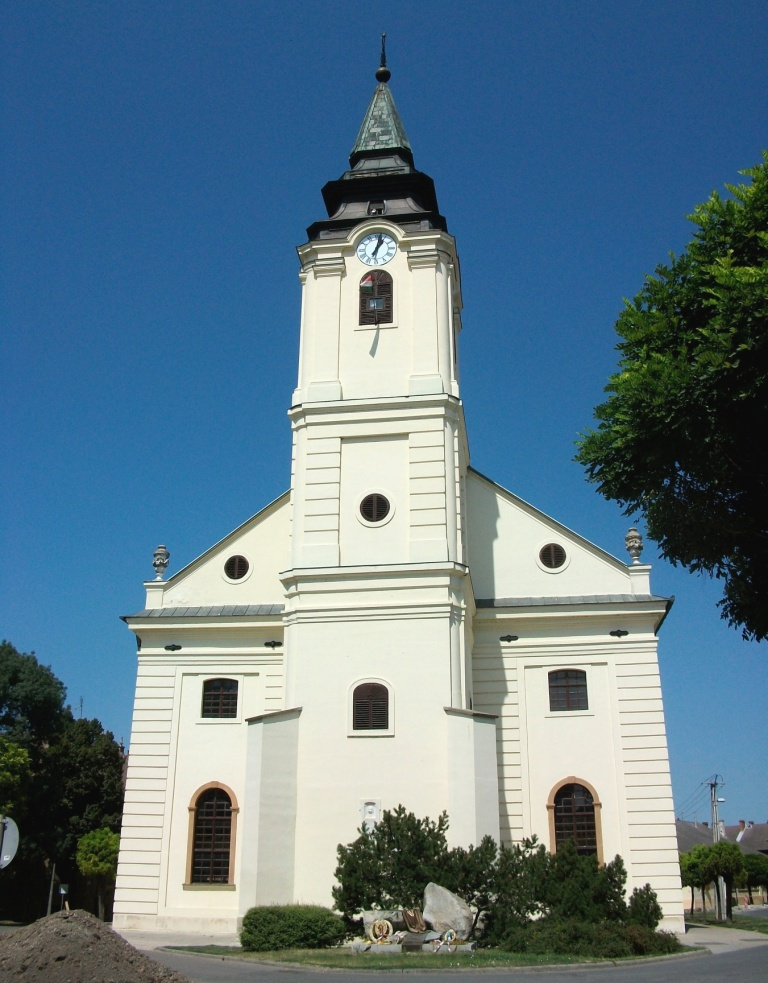
- Old Lutheran church (1786–1788)

- Flag Coat of arms

- Location within Hungary
- Coordinates: 46.864°N 20.557°E
- Country: Hungary
- County: Békés
- District: Szarvas

Area
  - Total: 161.57 km^{2} (62.38 sq mi)

Population (2011)
  - Total: 16,954
  - Density: 114.35/km^{2} (296.2/sq mi)
- Time zone: UTC+1 (CET)
  - Summer (DST): UTC+2 (CEST)
- Postal code: 5540
- Area code: (+36) 66
- Website: szarvas.hu

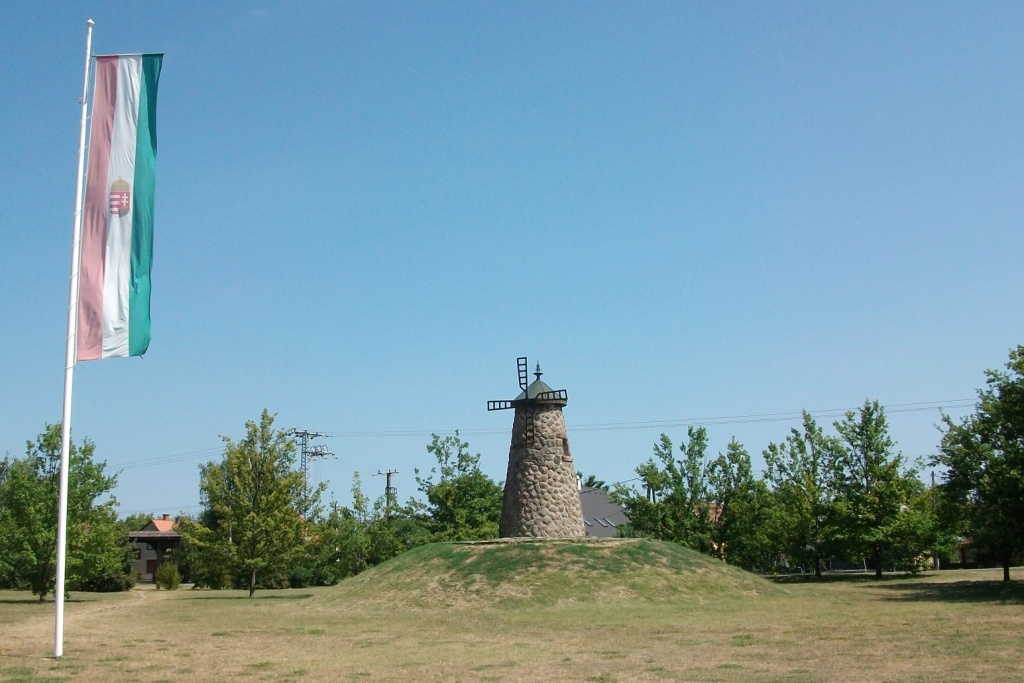
Geographical centre-point of Hungary before the Treaty of Trianon

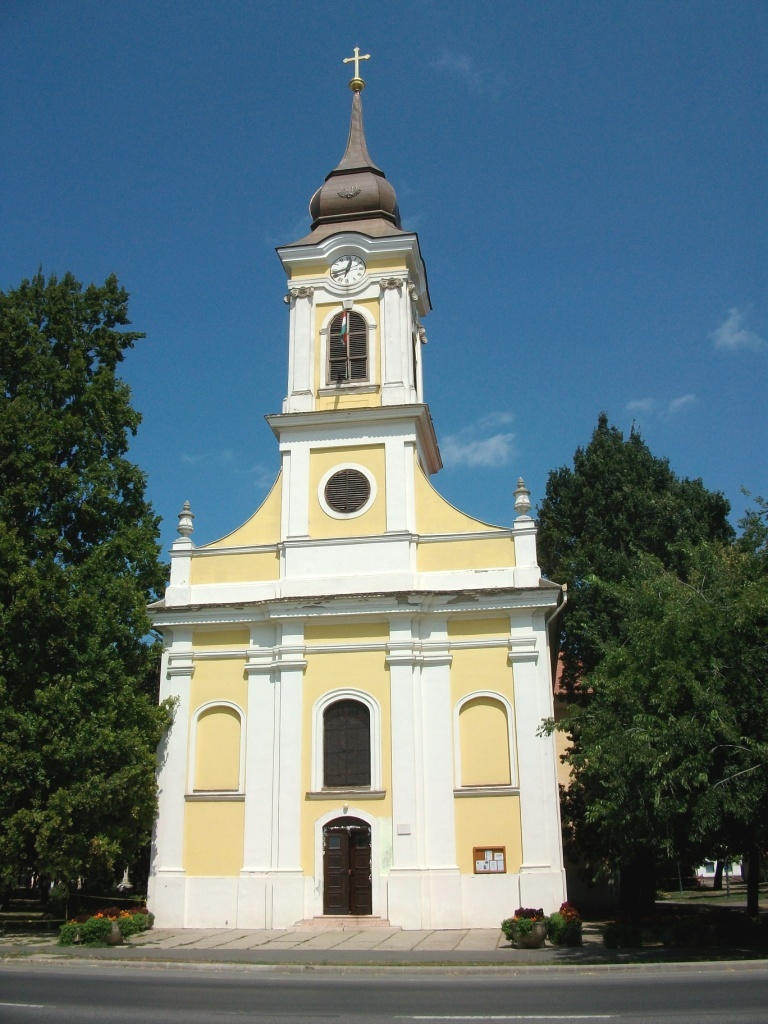
Roman Catholic church (1808–1812)

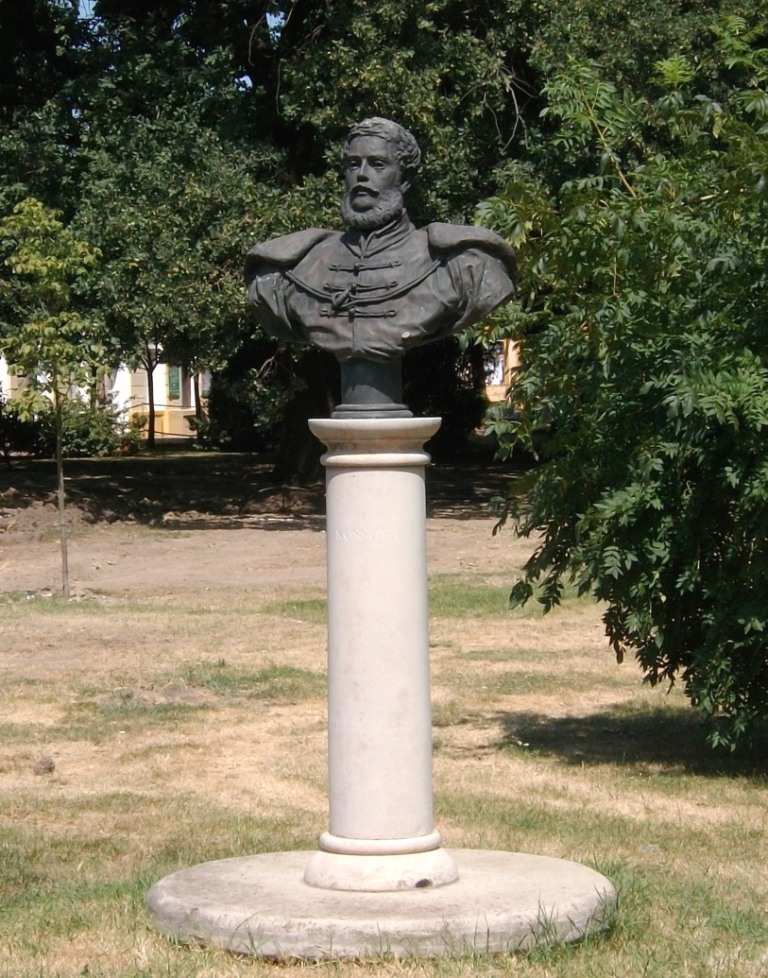
Bust of Lajos Kossuth

Szarvas (Slovak: Sarvaš, IPA: [sarvaʃ]; German: Sarwasch) is a town in Békés County, Hungary.

== Name ==
Placename Szarvas originated from the old Hungarian word szarvas, which means deer. Deer also can be found in the coat of arms of the town.

== Location ==
Szarvas is located in the Great Hungarian Plain upon the Körös River, 170 km (106 mi) southeast from Budapest. Highways 44 and 443, and the Mezőtúr-Orosháza-Mezőhegyes railway line also cross the town. The geographic centre of Hungary was near Szarvas before the Treaty of Trianon; a memorial in a windmill shape now marks that location in a park on a bank of the Körös River across from the Arboretum.

== History ==
According to the Hungarian Royal Treasury (Hungarian: Magyar Királyi Kincstár) it was an ethnic Hungarian town in 1495. The Medieval town was ruined due to the Ottoman wars, native Hungarian population fled from the area. It was uninhabited until 1720, when Austrian baron Johann Georg Freiherr von Harruckern (György János Harruckern) invited mainly Slovak settlers from Upper Hungary to the deserted area. They built a brand new town by the help of Sámuel Tessedik, who invited engineers to plan the town. Tessedik also established the first agricultural school in Hungary. Lutheran church was built from 1786 to 1788, the Roman Catholic from 1808 to 1812. Town hall was built in 1820. Hungarians overtook Slovaks in the 1920s, become the majority according to the census was held in 1930.

Since 1990 Szarvas is home to the Ronald S. Lauder Szarvas International Jewish Youth Camp (Hungarian: Szarvasi Nemzetközi Zsidó Ifjúsági Tábor).

== Demographics ==
According to the 2011 census the total population of Szarvas was 16,954, of whom there were 14,325 (84.5%) Hungarians, 1,822 (10.8%) Slovaks, 489 (2.9%) Romani and 75 (0.4%) Germans by ethnicity. 15.4% did not declare their ethnicity, excluding these people Hungarians made up 99.9% of the total population. In Hungary people can declare more than one ethnicity, so some people declared a minority one along with Hungarian.

In 2011 there were 4,531 (26.7%) Lutheran, 2,601 (15.3%) Roman Catholic and 708 (4.2%) Hungarian Reformed (Calvinist) in Szarvas. 4,087 people (24.1%) were irreligious and 200 (1.2%) Atheist, while 4,601 people (27.1%) did not declare their religion.

== Sights ==
- Szarvas Botanical Garden (Szarvasi Arborétum)
- Bolza Castle (Bolza-kastély)
- Dry Mill (Szárazmalom)
- Sámuel Tessedik Muzeum (Tessedik Sámuel Múzeum)
- Szarvas Spa (Szarvasi Gyógyfürdő)
- Csáky Castle (Csáky-kastély)
- Mitrovszky Castle (Mitrovszky-kastély)
- György Ruzicskay Art House (Ruzicskay György Alkotóház)
- Lutheran Old Church (Evangélikus ótemplom)
- New Lutheran Church (Evangélikus újtemplom)
- Slovak Country House (Szlovák tájház)

== Notable people ==
- Roland Lipcsei (1984), Hungarian football player
- Éva Novodomszky (1974), Hungarian journalist and presenter
- Endre Bajcsy-Zsilinszky (1886-1944), Hungarian politician
- Jon Urbanchek (János Urbancsok) (1936-2024), Hungarian American swimming coach

== Sport ==
- Szarvasi FC, association football club

== Twin towns – sister cities ==
Szarvas is twinned with:

- Baraolt, Romania
- Bucine, Italy
- Keuruu, Finland
- Malacky, Slovakia
- Poprad, Slovakia
- Șimleu Silvaniei, Romania
- Vlăhița, Romania
