= Békésszentandrás =

- Large village
- Coat of arms

- Location within Hungary
- Coordinates: 46°52′N 20°29′E
- Country: Hungary
- County: Békés
- District: Szarvas

Area
  - Total: 77.45 km^{2} (29.90 sq mi)

Population (2015)
  - Total: 3,608
  - Density: 47/km^{2} (120/sq mi)
- Time zone: UTC+1 (CET)
  - Summer (DST): UTC+2 (CEST)
- Postal code: 5561
- Area code: (+36) 66

Békésszentandrás is a village in Békés county, in the Southern Great Plain region of south-east Hungary.

== Geography ==
Békésszentandrás, the western gate of Békés county, lies along the left bank of the Hármas-Körös River. The territory of the village is divided by the M44 road. The village is situated 150 km from Budapest, the capital city, and 50 km away from the town of Békéscsaba. It covers an area of 77.45 km^{2} and has a population of 3608 people (2015).

The area has many prehistoric tumuli, known locally as kunhalom ('Cumanian Barrow'). The largest is Gödény-halom with a height of over 12 metres.

== History ==
After the Hungarian conquest nearly seventy settlements were founded in the region of the Körös rivers. Archaeological research indicates there were a number of smaller settlements in this region which later were depopulated during the Mongol invasion. The first written reference about Békésszentandrás – as we now know is from 1297. The name of the village was mentioned for the first time in a controversial issue in 1329. Its autonomy was recognised on 18 April 1330 and became the property of the Úzvásári family under the name of Zenthandreas. Almost a hundred years later the settlement became the Crown's property again. Around 1436 King Sigismund donated it to his Knight János Hunyadi. The construction and flourishing of the Szentandrási estate began in that period. Around 1460 the estate received market town rights. After the death of János Hunyadi, his wife Erzsébet Szilágyi managed the estate. She was followed by János Corvin and András Dánfy. Under the leadership of the Dánfy family the estate fell into pieces, lost its integrated management and market town rights. The four parts of the village were shared by Miklós Nagyfalusi Toldy, Anna Dánfy, the Paksy and Patócsi family. The number of people living in Szentandrás under the Turkish rule often changed. Many of them left the settlement during the fighting at Gyula and just slowly drifted back to their village. Due to the high tax burden many people fled to the free counties.

In 1596 Tatars destroyed the village, after that the territory was fallow for a long time. In the mid-1600s the area became populated again under the jurisdiction of György Rákóczi who was the Prince of Transylvania. In the 1690s it became deserted once again because of liberation wars and a plague outbreak.

In the early 1700s a magistrate, György Száraz received the territory for 32,000 Forints. His wife, Katalin Doróczi was a descendant of the Paksy family. The first settlers arrived in 1719 from Kaba, Bihar county and later others came after them. Among them were a number of resettled people. György Száraz leased the estate to the county treasurer István Tolna, who was very cruel to the residents. They rebelled and this sparked the biggest rebellion of the century on 27 April 1735. Its leaders were Péró Szegedinácz, and the judge of Szentandrás, Mihály Vértessi. In the 1740s, the population of the village continued to grow after new groups arrived: Catholics from the upper Tisza and Lutheran Slovaks from Hont and Nógrád counties. The latter, for the landlord's proposal migrated to Komlós mere. In 1796 a part of the inhabitants moved to Kishegyes mere.

The 19th century population of Szentandrás increased steadily. In 1827 3,740, in 1852 4,941, in 1890 6,362 inhabitants lived here. The village took part in the 1848-49 Independence War and several people became a victim. The most important event of that century was the river regulation so life became safer. The village was named Békésszentandrás at the end of the 1800s. Both World Wars had many casualties in the village, a Heroes' Statue reminds them which was inaugurated by József Archduke in 1927. One of the important results of the inter-war period is the introduction of carpet making which made Békésszentandrás world-famous. The others are the modernisation of the local administration and the secession of Csabacsüd in 1924. Between 1936 and 1942 the country's largest dam of that time was built on the Hármas-Körös River. The dam was put into operation by the Regent Miklós Horthy.

In the post-war period collectivisation played a key role in the village. Beside agriculture, carpenters, shoemakers, metalworkers and tailors formed a cooperative, too. In the early 1960s a municipal water network was built up and pavement construction was started in the village so the living conditions improved. From the late 60's agriculture is the main source of income in the area.

In 1970 Békésszentandrás got the so-called incorporated town title.

Since 1990 the village has been supplied with public utilities like the sewerage-, gas pipeline-, IT network and drainage ditch system. Most of the roads are fitted with solid surface. After the realisation of the future plans there's a realistic chance to establish a small town from the village.

== Famous people ==
- Ildikó Komlósi, Hungarian mezzo-soprano
- László Hadady (born 1956), oboist
- Bene Martin dancer, boxos, junior team footballer
