= Kondoros =

Coordinates: 46°45′N 20°48′E

- Town
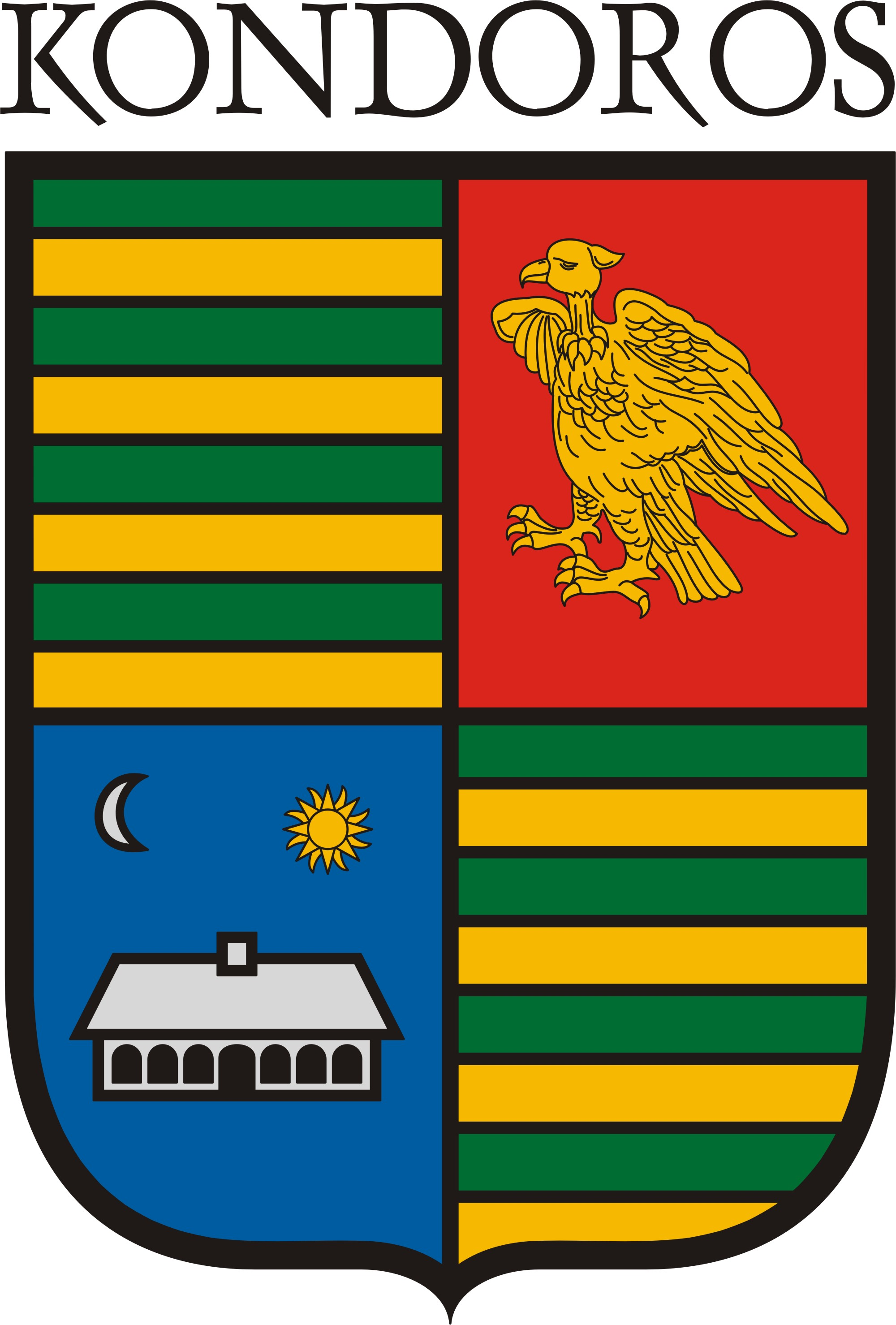
- Coat of arms
- Interactive map of Kondoros
- Country: Hungary
- County: Békés
- District: Szarvas

Area
  - Total: 81.84 km^{2} (31.60 sq mi)

Population (2009)
  - Total: 5,355
  - Density: 72/km^{2} (190/sq mi)
- Time zone: UTC+1 (CET)
  - Summer (DST): UTC+2 (CEST)
- Postal code: 5553
- Area code: (+36) 66
- Website: www.kondoros.hu

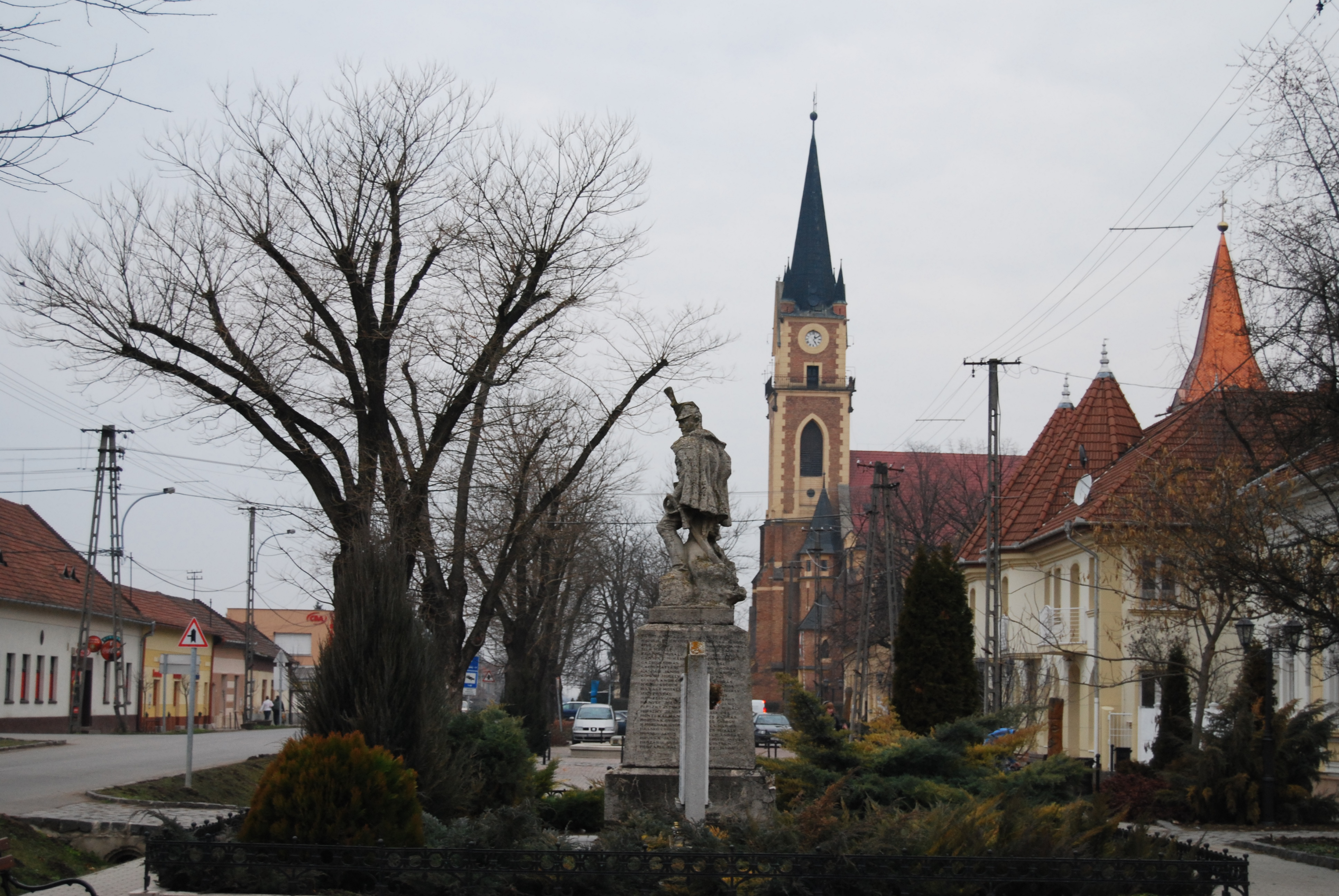
Centre of village

Kondoros (Slovak: Kondoroš) is a town in Békés County, in the Southern Great Plain region of south-east Hungary.

Jews lived in Kondoros at the end of the 19th century and at the beginning of the 20th century, the local Jewish community was subordinate to the Szarvas community. In 1944, most of the city's Jews were murdered in the Holocaust.

== Geography ==
It covers an area of 81.84 km² and has a population of 5,355 people (2009).

== Twin towns – sister cities ==
Kondoros is twinned with:

- Atid, Romania
- Gabčíkovo, Slovakia
- Hanhofen, Germany
- Kikinda, Serbia
- Tekovské Lužany, Slovakia
