= Szarvas District =

Szarvas District Szarvasi járás
- Districts of Hungary
- Coat of arms

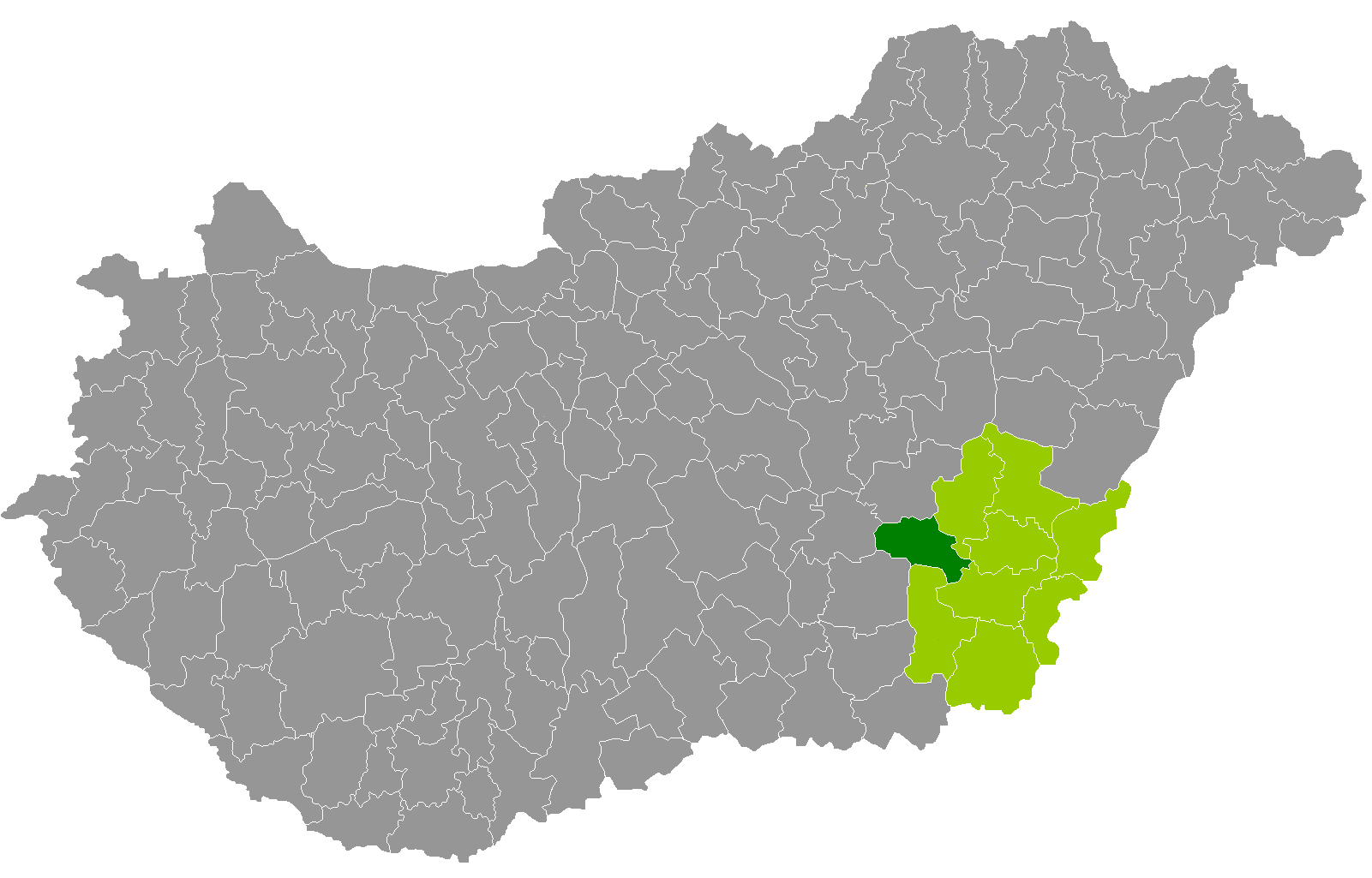
- Szarvas District within Hungary and Békés County.
- Coordinates: 46.86°N 20.55°E
- Country: Hungary
- County: Békés
- District seat: Szarvas

Area
  - Total: 485.06 km^{2} (187.28 sq mi)
  - Rank: 8th in Békés

Population (2011 census)
  - Total: 28,779
  - Rank: 7th in Békés
  - Density: 59/km^{2} (150/sq mi)

Szarvas (Hungarian: Szarvasi járás; Slovak: Sarvašský okres) is a district in western part of Békés County. Szarvas is also the name of the town where the district seat is found. The district is located in the Southern Great Plain Statistical Region.

== Geography ==
Szarvas District borders with Mezőtúr District (Jász-Nagykun-Szolnok County) to the north, Gyomaendrőd District to the northeast, Békés District to the east, Békéscsaba District to the southeast, Orosháza District and Szentes District (Csongrád County) to the south, Kunszentmárton District (Jász-Nagykun-Szolnok County) to the west. The number of the inhabited places in Szarvas District is 6.

== Municipalities ==
The district has 2 towns, 2 large villages and 2 villages. (ordered by population, as of 1 January 2012)

- Békésszentandrás (3,765)
- Csabacsűd (1,800)
- Kardos (608)
- **Kondoros** (5,201)
- Örménykút (374)
- **Szarvas** (17,007) – district seat

The bolded municipalities are cities, italics municipalities are large villages.

== Demographics ==
Religion in Szarvas District (2011 census)
1. Lutheranism (26.1%)
2. Calvinism (4.10%)
3. Catholic Church (19.0%)
4. Greek Catholicism (0.20%)
5. Other religions (1.20%)
6. Non-religious (23.8%)
7. Atheists (1.00%)
8. Undeclared (24.6%)

In 2011, it had a population of 28,779 and the population density was 59/km².

Year	County population	Change
2011	28,779	n/a

=== Ethnicity ===
Besides the Hungarian majority, the main minorities are the Slovak (approx. 3,000), Roma (500), German and Romanian (100).

Total population (2011 census): 28,779
Ethnic groups (2011 census): Identified themselves: 28,588 persons:

- Hungarians: 24,801 (86.75%)
- Slovaks: 2,820 (9.86%)
- Gypsies: 514 (1.80%)
- Others and indefinable: 453 (1.58%)

Approx. 200 persons in Szarvas District did not declare their ethnic group at the 2011 census.

=== Religion ===
Religious adherence in the county according to 2011 census:

- Evangelical – 7,523;
- Catholic – 5,510 (Roman Catholic – 5,463; Greek Catholic – 47);
- Reformed – 1,191;
- other religions – 338;
- Non-religious – 6,860;
- Atheism – 278;
- Undeclared – 7,079.

== Gallery ==
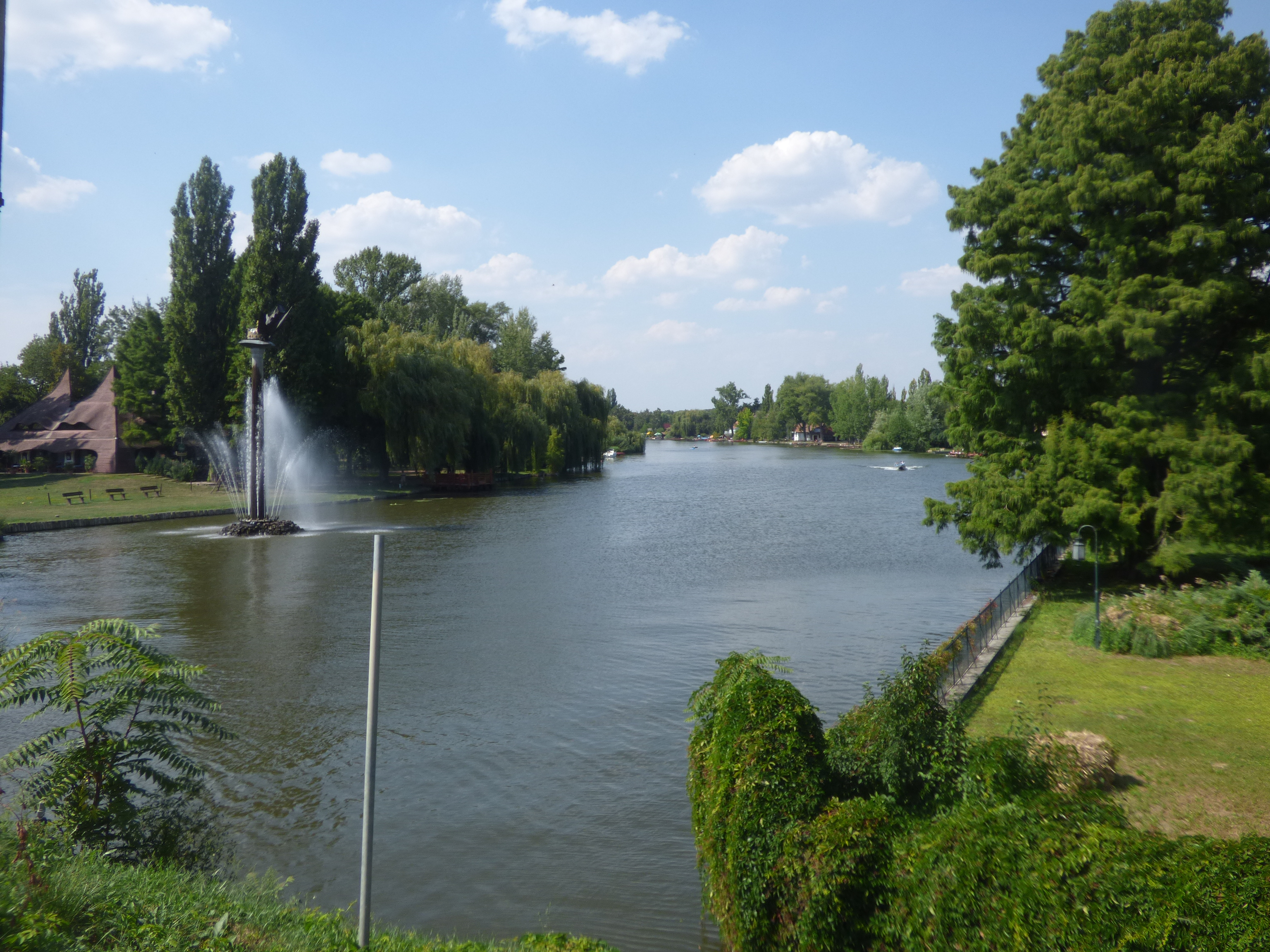
Szarvas, the district seat

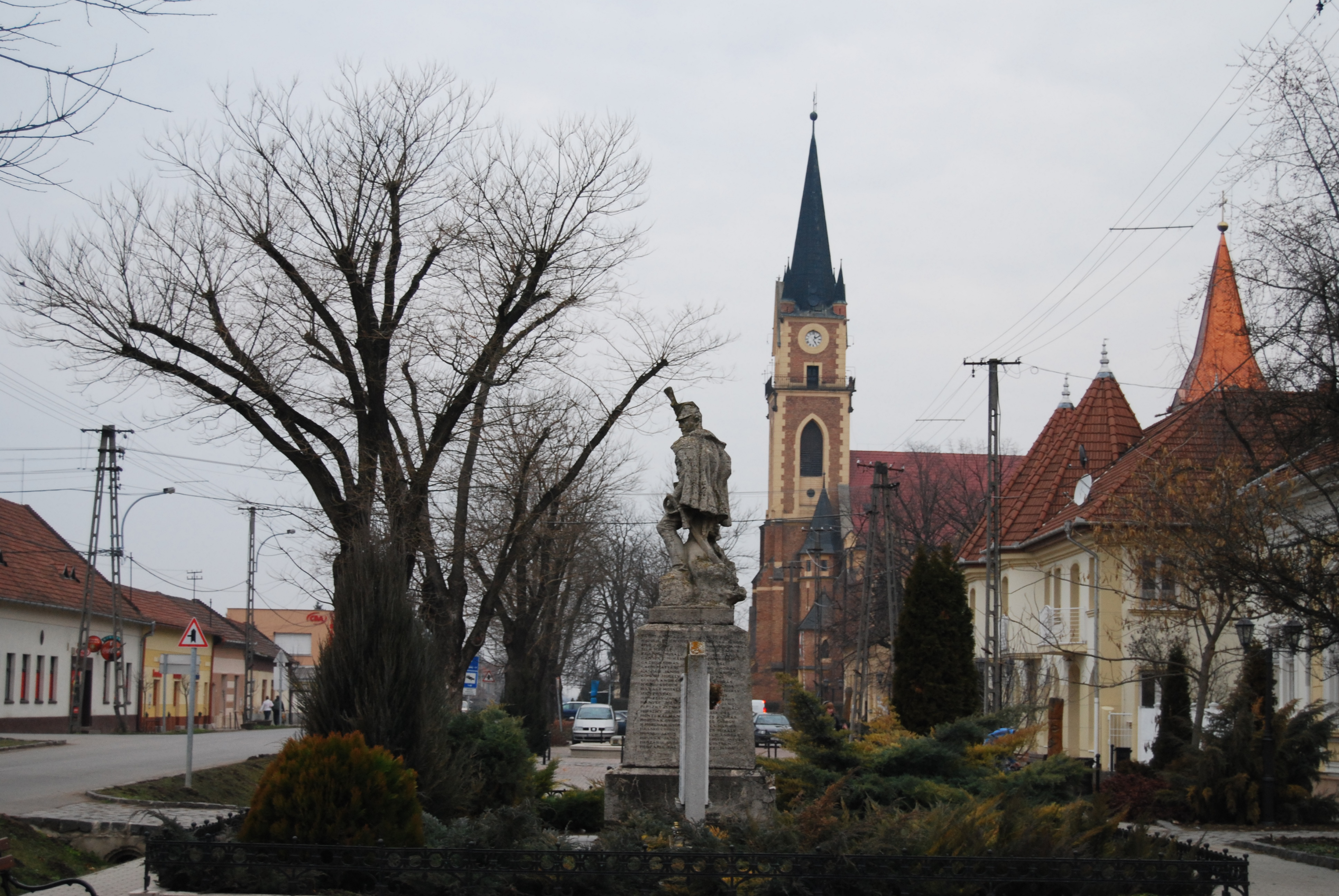
View of Kondoros

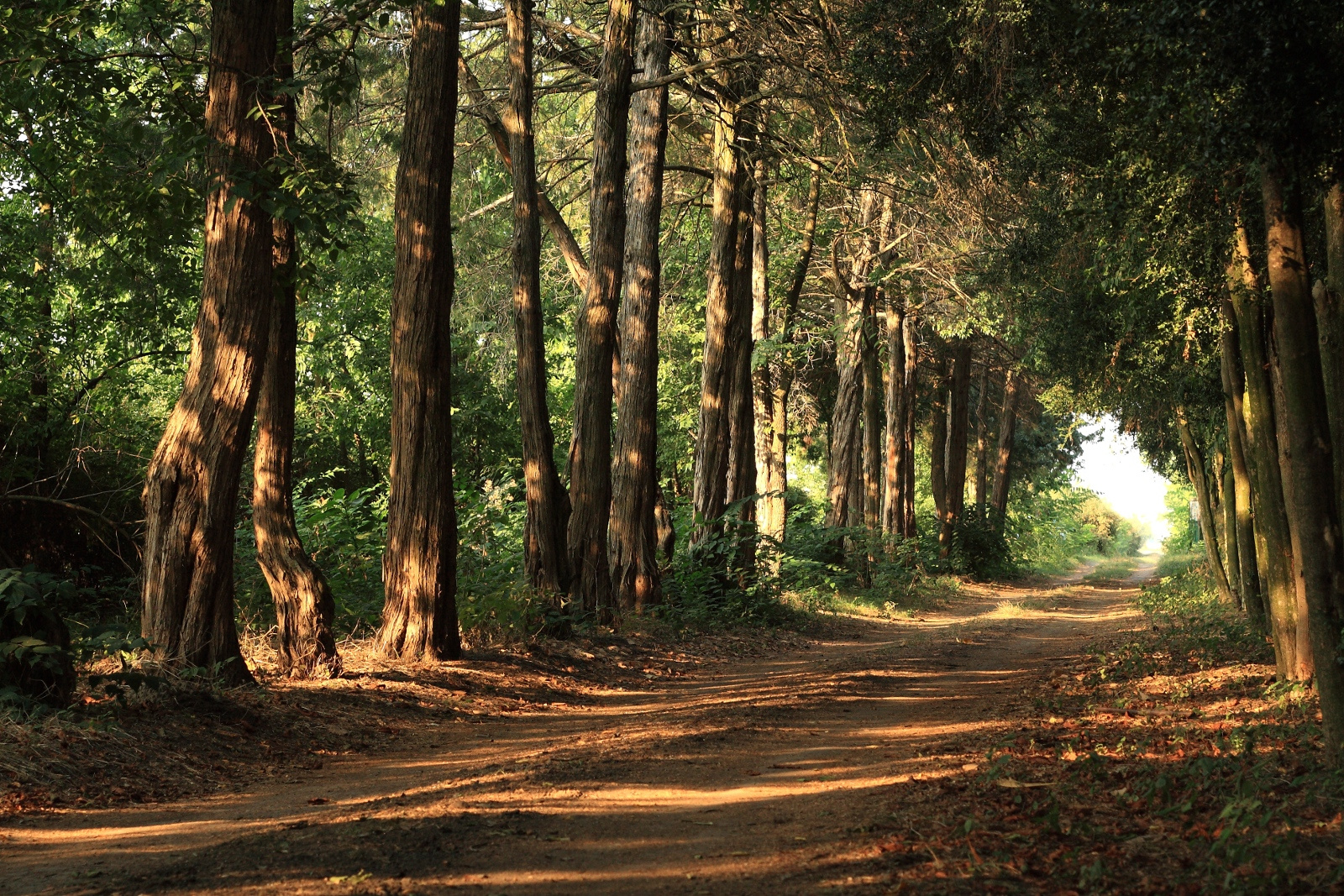
Batthyány-Geist hunting lodge near Kondoros

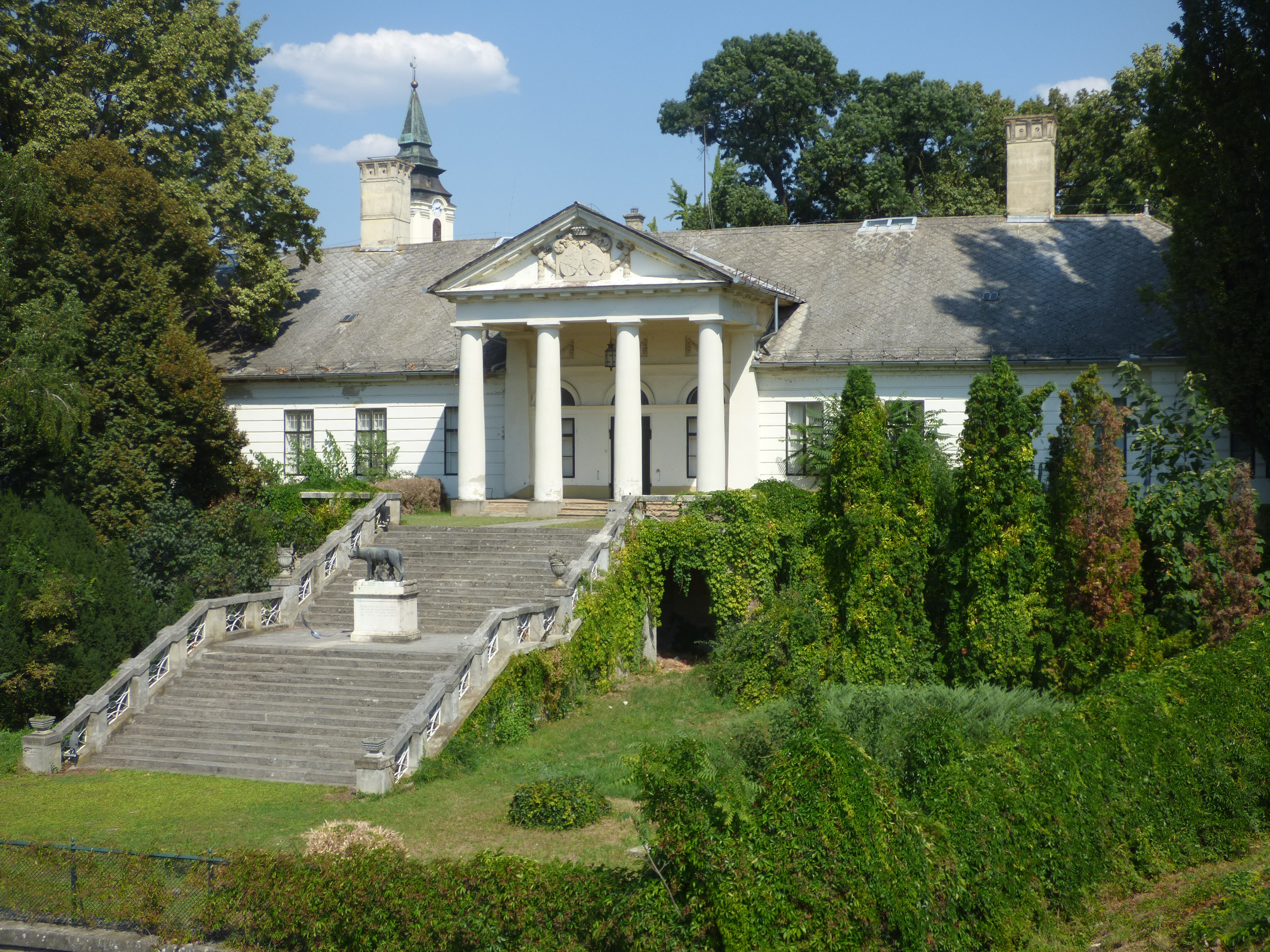
Tessedik Sámuel Collage in Szarvas

== See also ==
- List of cities and towns of Hungary
