= Erzsébet Csézi =

Hungarian musical artist and politician (born 1979)

Csézy
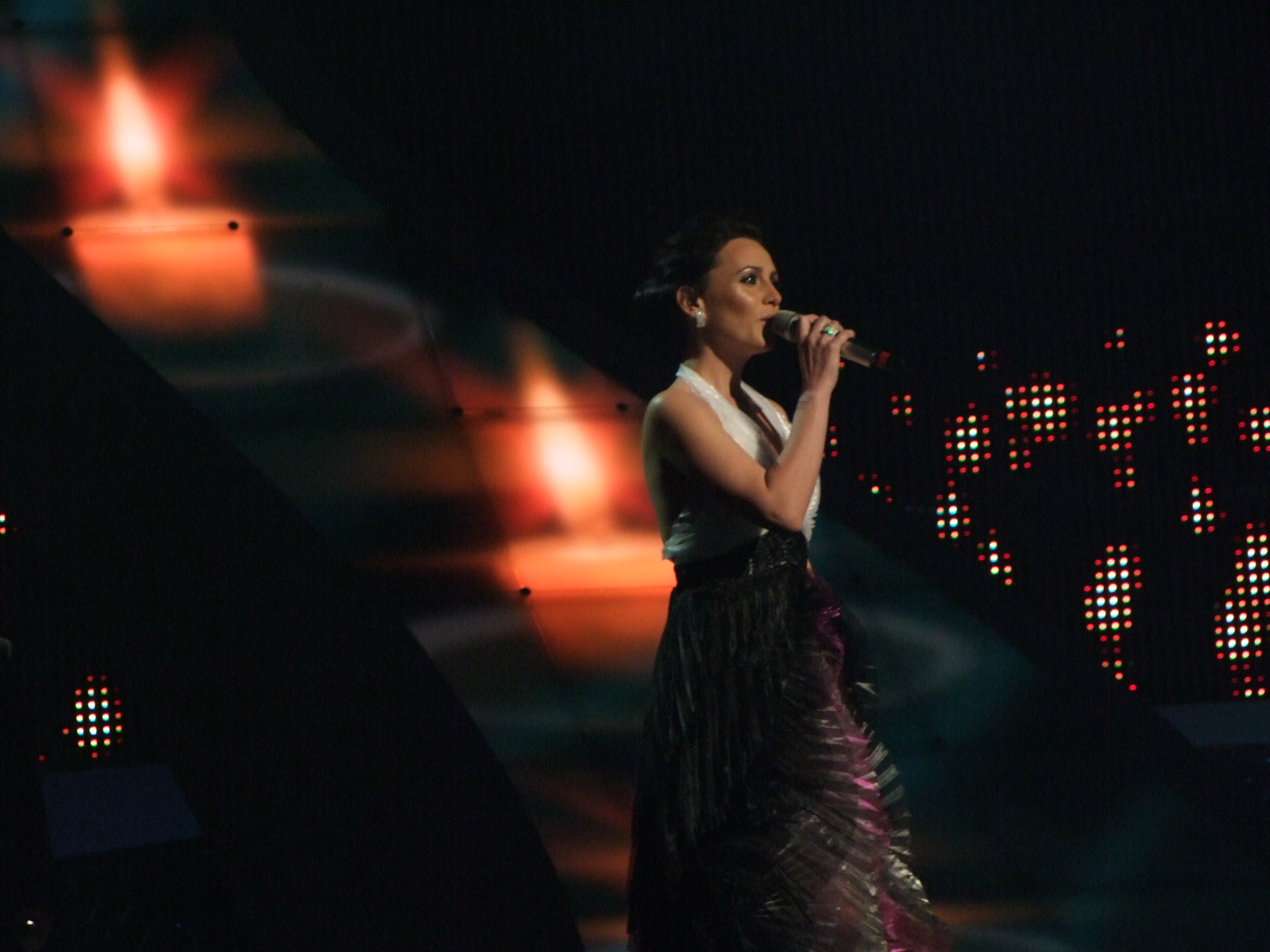
- Csézy in 2008

Member of the National Assembly
- Assuming office 9 May 2026
- Succeeding: András Tállai
- Constituency: Borsod-Abaúj-Zemplén 7th

Personal details
- Born: Erzsébet Csézi; 9 October 1979 (age 46) Mezőkövesd, Hungary
- Party: Tisza
- Musical career
- Origin: Hungary
- Genres: Pop
- Occupation: Singer
- Instruments: vocal, contralto
- Years active: 2007–present
- Label: Magneoton
- Website: csezy.hu

Erzsébet Csézi (born 9 October 1979 in Mezőkövesd) known professionally as Csézy, is a Hungarian pop singer and politician. On 8 February 2008 she was chosen to represent Hungary at the Eurovision Song Contest in Belgrade with the song "Candlelight". She finished last in the second semi-final on 22 May with six points.

In the 2026 Hungarian parliamentary election she was elected to represent the Borsod-Abaúj-Zemplén County 7th constituency for the Tisza Party, defeating incumbent András Tállai.

== Discography ==
=== Albums ===
Album information
Szívverés
- Released: 9 November 2007
- Chart Positions: #9 HUN
- HUN certification: Gold
- HUN Sales: 5,000+
- Official singles:
  - Általad vagyok (#24 HUN)
  - Szívverés/Candlelight
Album information
Csak egy nő
- Released: 15 September 2009
- Chart Positions:
- HUN certification:
- HUN Sales:
- Official singles:
  - Csak egy nő
  - Mama

== See also ==
- Hungarian pop
- Hungary in the Eurovision Song Contest 2008

Awards and achievements
Preceded by Magdi Rúzsa with "Unsubstantial Blues"	Hungary in the Eurovision Song Contest; 2008	Succeeded by Zoli Ádok with "Dance with Me"
