= Music FM (Hungary) =

Former radio station in Budapest

Coordinates: 47.49185709844787°N 18.97934866622261°E

89.5 Music FM
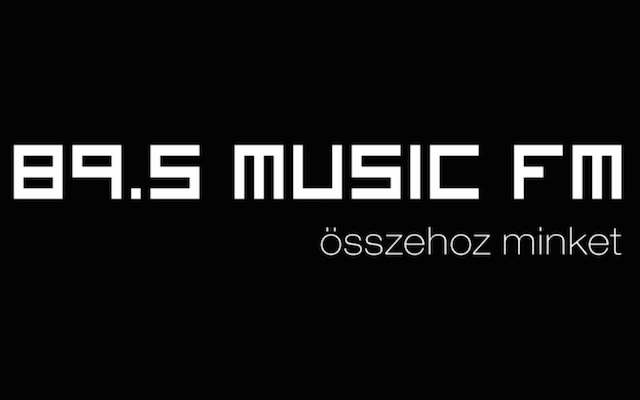
- Budapest; Hungary
- Frequency: 89.5 MHz

Programming
- Format: Contemporary hit radio

Ownership
- Owner: Kiss Anikó

History
- First air date: 7 March 2012; 14 years ago
- Last air date: 7 February 2019; 7 years ago

Technical information
- ERP: 77,600 watts

Links
- Website: musicfm.hu

Music FM was a Hungarian commercial radio station, airing at 89.5 FM in Budapest. Its first broadcast was on 7 March 2012.

Music FM had a Top 50 popularity chart.

The station ceased its operations at 23:59 on 7 February 2019 after multiple unsuccessful applications to renew its permit for the frequency at the end of the seven years contract.

== See also ==
- List of Hungarian-language radio stations
