= Miklós Malek (composer) =

Hungarian composer and conductor

Miklós Malek (born 3 June 1945, in Budapest, Hungary) is a Hungarian award winning composer and conductor. He has won many awards: Táncdalfesztivál - Hangszerelési díj (1969), Lyra-díj (1994), Fényes Szabolcs-díj (1996), EMeRTon-díj (2000), Erkel Ferenc-díj (2004) and Artisjus Életmű-díj (2004)

He was admitted to the Franz Liszt Academy of Music where he graduated in 1970 obtaining the diploma after studying classical music. He joined Angyalföldi Dixieland Zenekar orchestra in 1963 and from 1969 onwards, he worked for two decades as band composer-arranger including from 1969 with Magyar Rádió (Hungarian Radio).

From 1983 he worked as a musical director, including starting 1992 until 1999 with Magyar Televízió (Hungarian television). He worked with many artists including Géza Hofi, Kati Kovács, Zorán, János Koós, Caterina Valenté, Harold Faltermeyer, Helen Schneider and Al Di Meola among others.

As a composer of popular music, he has covered a number of important orchestral, symphonic pieces. In addition to his compositions, he has arranged for and conducted on many musical works, albums and singles.

== Personal life ==
He is married to Mária Toldy, a pop singer and has two children, Andrea, a singer and actress, and Miklós Malek, a successful musician, a songwriter and producer and judge / mentor in the Hungarian X-Faktor.

== Works ==
Orchestral pieces

- 1974: Hívogató
- 1978: Angyalföld
- 1978: Kicsik és nagyok
- 1981: Ha felszáll a köd
- 1982: Téli mese
- 1983: Lepketánc
- 1984: Elégia
- 1985: Éjfél után
- 1986: Pas de deux
- 1987: Újpesti orgonák
- 1990: Walzer

Symphonic works

- 1998: Trombitaverseny
- 2000: Kürtverseny
- 2002: Harsonaverseny
- 2003: Carmen (adaptation)
- 2004: Quo vadis - Concerto for Strings
