= Éva Novodomszky =

Hungarian journalist and presenter

- Born: 19 January 1974 (age 52); Szarvas, Hungary
- Occupations: Journalist; presenter

Éva Novodomszky (born 19 January 1974) is a Hungarian journalist and presenter.

She started her career in a journalist school (Komlósi Oktatási Stúdió). She became a reporter (then presenter) of news of youth in Magyar Televízió. Later she worked for Parlamenti Napló, EuroPercek, Szabadság tér and Híradó. She has been the presenter of Híradó (News) since 2000. She has been married to Italian Mr. Salvatore Sgroi, businessman in a gastronomic sector, with whom she has had two sons, named Cristiano and Marco.

From 2007 until 2014, she was the Hungarian spokesperson of Eurovision Song Contest, and she hosted the Hungarian National Final for Eurovision Song Contest 2008.
