= M1 (Hungarian TV channel) =

Hungarian television channel

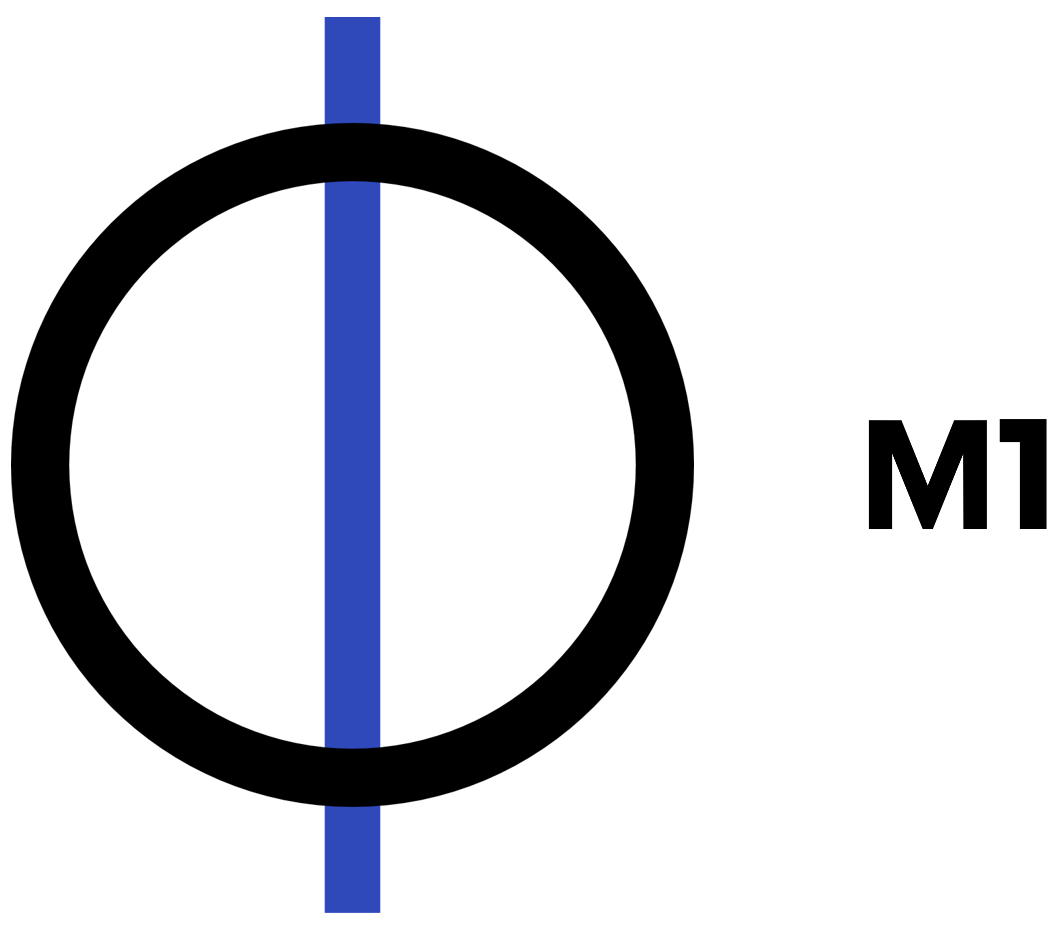
- Country: Hungary
- Broadcast area: Hungary, reaching bordering regions via overspill of the Hungarian terrestrial network
- Headquarters: 1073 Budapest, Kunigunda útja 64, Hungary

Programming
- Language: Hungarian
- Picture format: 1080i HDTV (downscaled to 16:9 576i for the SDTV feed)

Ownership
- Owner: Hungarian Radio and Television (MRTV)
- Sister channels: Duna; Duna World; M2; M3; M4 Sport; M4 Sport +; M5

History
- Launched: 1 May 1957; 69 years ago
- Former names: MTV (1957–1971, 2002–2005); MTV1 (1971–1989, 1994–2000); TV1 (1989–1994)

Links
- Website: www.mediaklikk.hu/m1

Availability

Terrestrial
- One Terrestrial TV: Channel 1

M1 (em egy [ˈɛm ɛɟː]) is a Hungarian free-to-air television channel owned and operated by state-owned public broadcaster Hungarian Radio and Television (MRTV). It is the company's flagship television channel and is known for broadcasting mainstream and generalist programming, including Híradó news bulletins. It is the oldest television channel in Hungary as it was launched on 1 May 1957 by Magyar Televízió (MTV).

M1 became a 24-hour news network from 2015 with its entertainment programming transferred to Duna until 2026 when the network was reverted back into its pre-2015 generalist form following massive restructuring. During its time as a news channel M1 had condensed versions of its news in English, German, Russian and Chinese which were broadcast on the network once a day.

== History ==
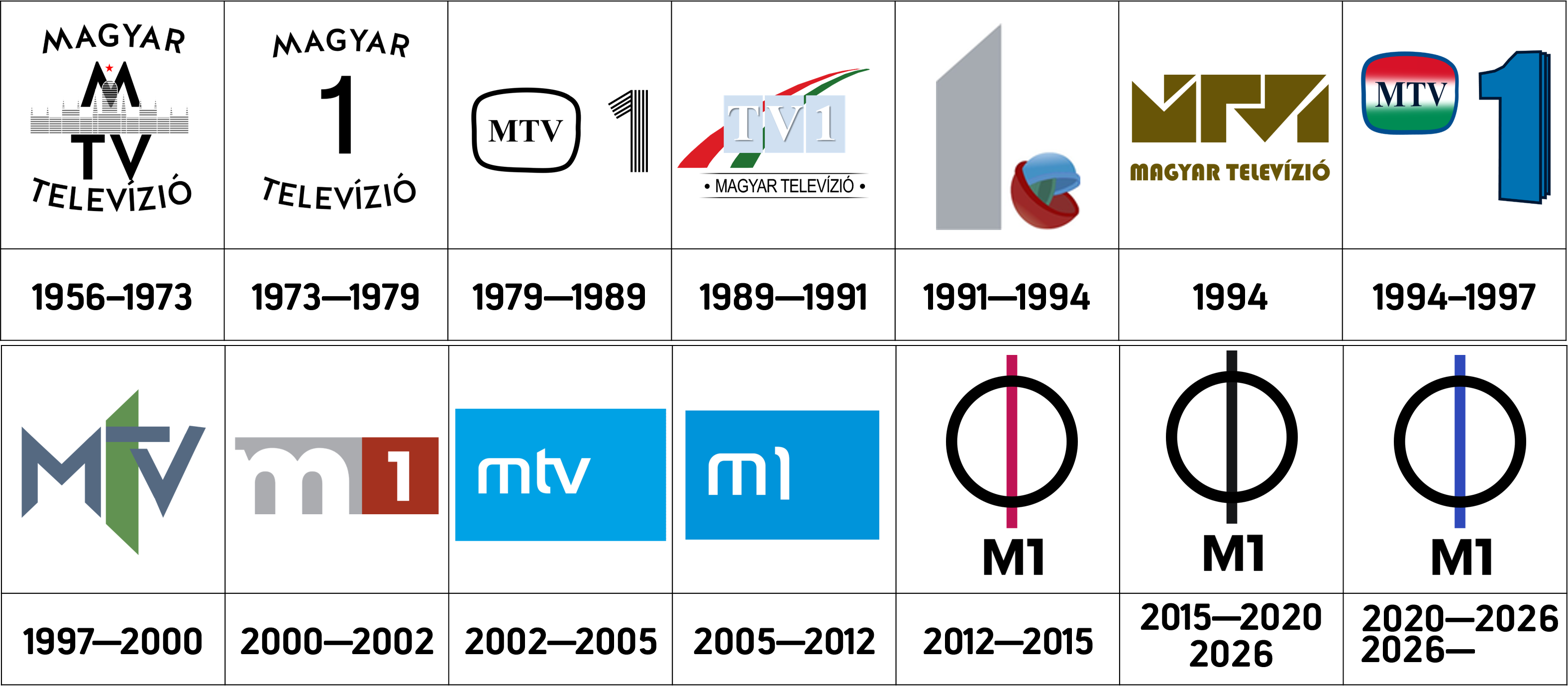
The logos used for the channel throughout its history

=== Beginning ===
In addition to the continuous expansion and development of radio broadcasting, by the 1950s there was also the need to localize the TV stations that were spreading in the West. The first test broadcast was broadcast on 15 December 1953 from the Gyáli út postal experiment station. The second trial took place in June 1955 at the Hungarian Post Experimental Institute on Szabadság Hill, next to the former Hargita hostel. And in 1955, the first 60-meter Széchenyi Hill tower was built. It started its actual operation on 23 February 1957, but it officially began its operation with the mediation of the 1st May Labor Day ceremony. The regular television broadcasting only started in 1958 until then, the transmission towers only operated in test mode. However, to cover the entire country, it was necessary to build new transmitters, so the backbone transmitter network was created, and repeater stations were built across the country.

The first color television broadcast took place in 1969. In the 1970s and 1980s, the transmitter network was further expanded. In the beginning, it was broadcast only a few days a week, not at all on Long Monday. The exception was the broadcast of an event that aroused national interest, such as Bertalan Farkas' space travel in 1980. Here, the launch of the spaceship took place on Monday. It has been broadcast every day of the week since 1989.

An episode of DuckTales as part of Walt Disney bemutatja was interrupted on 12 December 1993 to announce of the death of József Antall.

=== Enlargement and social media ===
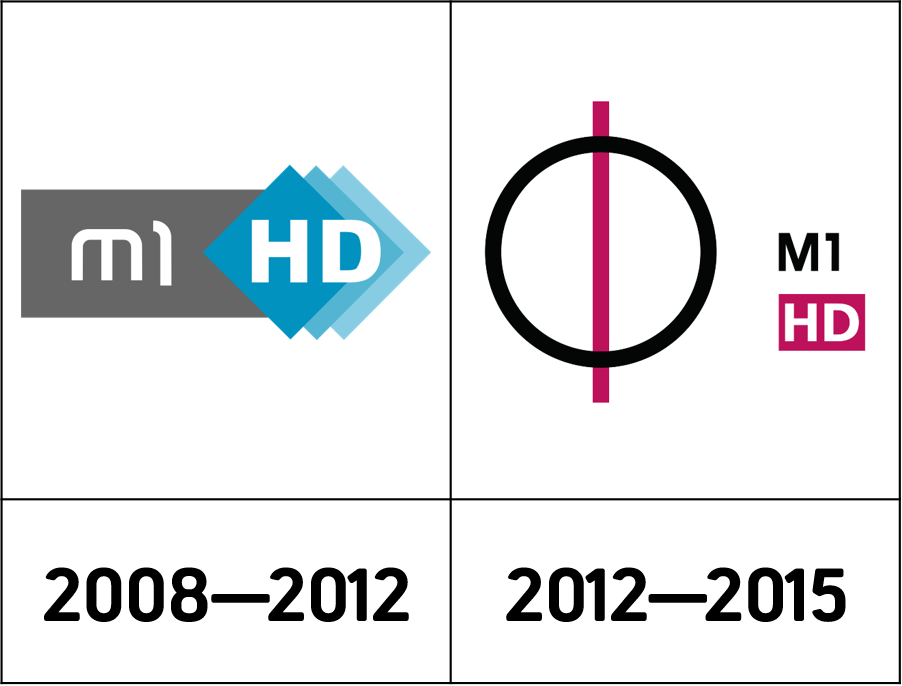
M1's HD logos

The M2 channel began broadcasting in 1971. In the beginning, it supplemented and repeated the program structure of M1, from the beginning of the 2000s it was a cultural and informative channel, and since 2012 it has been gradually transformed and operates as a children's channel. On 15 March 2015, a new channel was launched in the evening section of the M2 children's channel as part of the Petőfi brand, and with this, the M2 channel was transformed under the name M2 Petőfi.

In 2009, MTV launched their internet mainly informational channel, called webm3, which was short-lived, the third station, M3, actually broadcasts only from 20 December 2013, but with a different theme from its online predecessor, because here it is mainly the 30-year-old archive content is the main role. The channel ceased operations on 1 May 2019 and is currently broadcast online.

On 18 July 2015, the fourth thematic channel dealing with sports, called M4 Sport, was launched, on which, in addition to the most important sports events, the 16 prominent Hungarian sports also play a major role.

M5 was launched on 6 August 2016 as a secondary sports channel, airing the 2016 Summer Olympics. It has been broadcasting informative, educational, and cultural content since 18 September.

On 12 September, 2020, M4 Sport+ was launched on Duna World as a block, broadcasting between 14:00 and 22:00 CET during the weekends.

=== Collaborating with MTVA and news network era ===
Since 1 January 2011, it has been part of the media programs of the Media Support and Asset Management Fund (MTVA).

From 27 July 2012, the entire MTVA and thus the channel changed its image and logo, along with the Hungarian Broadcasting Office, its partner channels (M2, Duna, Duna World), and the radios belonging to the Media Service Support and Management Fund. In addition, the channel received new channel voices, one by Gerda Pikali and the other by Zoltán Rátóti.

On 15 March 2015, the channel became a 24-hour news channel, and the channel voices were János Csernák and Márta Herczegh. The previous programs were transferred to Duna after it became the main national channel. From that day on, Híradó, Ma reggel, and the weather forecast were also renewed. The ratings of the main edition of Híradó decreased in the months following the reconversion.

A 2019 report by the European Federation of Journalists stated that news coverage of M1 was not balanced, opposition politicians' viewpoints are nearly absent from the reports, and there is a lack of transparency over the funding and work of MTVA. The report concluded that the "public service media have been deformed into state media."

On 15 March 2020, the identity of the M1 was renewed again at 05:55 and the on-screen logo was moved from the upper left corner to the lower left corner.

=== Restructuring ===
At 16:00 CEST on 7 July 2026, its programming was suspended and replaced with an on-screen message:

"A közmédia nem hazudhat. Bocsánatot kérünk, amiért hosszú éveken át mégis ezt tettük! A közmédia most átalakul, hogy a jövőben független és hiteles legyen. A hírszolgáltatás átmenetileg szünetel. Maradjanak velünk!"

"Public media should not lie. We apologize for having done so for many years! Public media is currently being transformed to ensure that in the future, it remains trustworthy and independent. News services are temporarily suspended. Please stay with us!"

The move came after interim MTVA Chairman András P. Horváth stripped channel director Zsolt Németh of his duties. Minutes after the decision, Prime Minister Péter Magyar announced on social media that the date marked the end of "lies" on all public media platforms. Programming was rebooted at 19:56 (a reference to the 1956 anti-communist revolution), becoming a temporary reincarnation of M3, broadcasting Hungarian movies and TV shows from across the eras of Hungarian film and TV history while slowly re-introducing news broadcasts in the coming months. On 11 July 2026, news services had come back in the form of a news banner on the bottom part of the screen.

Its first programme after the reboot was the Hungarian political satire comedy film The Witness.

On 18 July 2026, the channel unveiled a new schedule, consisting of classic Hungarian movies and television shows. The revamped schedule focuses on Hungarian cinematic heritage, with weekends dedicated to influential directors and actors, while weekday evening programming will feature some of Hungary’s most popular television dramas and sitcoms.

=== Restoration of news broadcasts ===
On 20 August 2026 (the 1025th anniversary of Saint Stephen's coronation and the formal founding of the Kingdom of Hungary) at 6 AM, news broadcasts came back in a brand-new studio and with a brand-new set of graphics packages. The sports news block also got renamed back into TeleSport after an 11-year-long period of being called "Nemzeti Sporthíradó" (National Sports News), also being made with a new look.

The revamped news were broadcast four times on the national holiday: at 6 AM, at noon, at 7:30 PM and at 10 PM, alongside live discussions with guests invited to the studio about the holiday and live coverage of the holiday's programmes in Budapest, various regional capitals and small towns and from areas of neighbouring countries where Hungarian communities live. Starting the next day, the final schedule consists of two broadcasts: at noon and at 7:30 PM. Other than the news, weather forecasts and pollen forecasts, the channel's theme stayed the same: retro Hungarian movies, TV shows and variety shows.

== Programming ==
=== Current shows ===
- Híradó ("News"), news programme
- TeleSport, sport news

=== Noon program block ===
Between 1994 and 1997 there was a noon program block from 12:00 to 15:30 CET. It was the first program to be preceded by a clock. Entertainment content was broadcast without advertisements.

=== School programmes ===
Between 1971 and 1989, school programmes were broadcast during the day. This meant startup was at 08:00 instead of 18:00. During weekends, during the summer and winter, programmes overall started at 18:00 with MTV2.

In 1989, school programming was replaced with morning programmes broadcast between 05:40 and 09:00. The station closed down between 11:00 and 15:30. Later, there was the information program between 11:00 and 12:00 afternoon programming until 15:30. Broadcasts on the channel therefore spanned from 05:40 to 23:25 or 02:00.

=== Former shows ===
- A Hét ("The Week"), weekly affairs programme
- Ablak ("Window")
- Delta, science technology magazine
- Panoráma, foreign affairs
- Budapest Híradó ("Budapest News"), regional news programme
- Délután! ("Afternoon!"), entertainment afternoon program from 12:00 to 15:30 ran until 1997
- Kinevezés és kinevezése ("Appointment and appointee"), Hungary's first sitcom (broadcasting between 1984 and 1987), broadcasting on Wednesday night at 23:15 to 23:45
- Marslakók ("Aliens"), an original Hungarian daily soap opera, UFOs From The Mars in English
- Mindent Vagy Semmit! ("All Or Nothing!"), the Hungarian version of Jeopardy!
- Szerencsekerék ("Wheel of Fortune"), the Hungarian version of Wheel of Fortune
- Szomszédok ("Neighbours"), soap opera which ran until 30 December 1999
- Walt Disney bemutatja ("Walt Disney presents"), Hungarian version of The Disney Afternoon, ran from 1991 to 1998

== Controversies ==
Ever since the end of communism in Hungary, M1's news programming has been repeatedly criticised of having a bias towards the contemporary Hungarian government, with this criticism becoming more prevalent ever since the conservative party Fidesz became the ruling party in the country in 2010, in part due to the company responsible by the channel, MTVA, being directly controlled by the Hungarian Parliament, compromising its independence.

In 2019 a leaked audio recording made during the run-up to European Parliament elections showed a senior MTVA editor, Balazs Bende informing reporters that the institution does not favor the opposition's list and the reporters should work accordingly. Bende instructed the reporters to produce content using the "appropriate" narrative and methodology, especially on topics like Brussels and migrants.

At the beginning of August 2026, it was leaked who would become the new editor-in-chief of M1. Prime Minister Péter Magyar commented on the corresponding Facebook post from an online portal with the words: "I don't think so." 24 hours later, the personnel decision was reversed. According to German ARD, it cannot be proven beyond doubt that this happened under pressure from Magyar. Nevertheless, Amnesty International found it a cause for criticism, on the basis that a head of government should not publicly comment on personnel decisions of a broadcaster that is actually independent.
